= Teddy Bear Clinic v Minister of Justice =

South African legal case

- Court: Constitutional Court of South Africa
- Full case name: The Teddy Bear Clinic for Abused Children and Another v Minister of Justice and Constitutional Development and Another
- Decided: 3 October 2013
- Citation: [2013] ZACC 35

Case history
- Prior action: Application for confirmation from North Gauteng High Court

Court membership
- Judges sitting: Mogoeng CJ, Froneman, Jafta, Khampepe, Nkabinde, Skweyiya & Zondo JJ, Bosielo & Mhlantla AJ

Case opinions
- Decision by: Justice Khampepe

The Teddy Bear Clinic for Abused Children and Another v Minister of Justice and Constitutional Development and Another, [2013] ZACC 35, is a decision of the Constitutional Court of South Africa which dealt with the application of statutory rape laws to consensual sexual acts when both parties are younger than the age of consent. The court struck down as unconstitutional the provisions of the Criminal Law (Sexual Offences and Related Matters) Amendment Act, 2007 that made it a crime for children between the ages of 12 and 16 to engage in consensual sexual activity with other children in the same age range. The court found that these laws infringed the rights to dignity and privacy and the best interests of the child principle.
