= Economic Freedom Fighters v Speaker of the National Assembly (2017) =

South African legal case

EFF v Speaker
- Court: Constitutional Court of South Africa
- Full case name: Economic Freedom Fighters and Others v Speaker of the National Assembly and Another
- Decided: 29 December 2017
- Docket nos.: CCT 76/17
- Citations: [2017] ZACC 47; 2018 (3) BCLR 259 (CC); 2018 (2) SA 571 (CC)

Case history
- Related action: Economic Freedom Fighters v Speaker of the National Assembly and Others; Democratic Alliance v Speaker of the National Assembly and Others [2016] ZACC 11

Court membership
- Judges sitting: Mogoeng CJ, Zondo DCJ, Cameron J, Froneman J, Jafta J, Madlanga J, Mhlantla J, Theron J, Kathree-Setiloane AJ, Kollapen AJ and Zondi AJ

Case opinions
- The Constitution requires the National Assembly to make rules regulating the removal of a President in terms of section 89(1) of the Constitution. The National Assembly failed in this obligation and in its obligation to determine whether President Jacob Zuma committed impeachable conduct under section 89(1) when he failed to comply with the Public Protector's report on Nkandlagate.
- Decision by: Jafta J (Cameron, Froneman, Kathree-Setiloane, Kollapen, Mhlantla and Theron concurring)
- Concurrence: Froneman J (Cameron, Jafta, Kathree-Setiloane, Kollapen, Mhlantla and Theron concurring)
- Dissent: Zondo DCJ (Mogoeng, Madlanga and Zondi concurring)
- Dissent: Mogoeng CJ

Keywords
- Accountability of the President; exclusive jurisdiction; impeachment; National Assembly; Public Protector's remedial action; section 89 of the Constitution; separation of powers

Economic Freedom Fighters and Others v Speaker of the National Assembly and Another is a 2017 decision of the Constitutional Court of South Africa on Parliament's constitutional obligation to hold the President accountable for his conduct. In a majority judgment written by Justice Chris Jafta, the court ordered the National Assembly to make rules regulating presidential impeachment under section 89 of the Constitution and to use those rules to determine whether President Jacob Zuma had committed impeachable conduct in failing to comply with a report by the Public Protector. Arising from the Nkandlagate scandal, the case was politically sensitive, and critics held that the court's order transgressed the separation of powers.

== Background ==
The matter was one of several arising from Nkandlagate, the public scandal surrounding state-funded upgrades to Jacob Zuma's Nkandla homestead during Zuma's tenure as President of South Africa. Although a March 2014 report by the Public Protector, Thuli Madonsela, had found that Zuma had benefitted unduly from the upgrades, the Public Protector's remedial action was not implemented. The Economic Freedom Fighters (EFF) and Democratic Alliance (DA), two opposition parties, sought legal recourse, leading in March 2016 to the Constitutional Court's judgment in EFF v Speaker of the National Assembly; DA v Speaker of the National Assembly (EFF I). In EFF I, the Constitutional Court held that the Public Protector's remedial action was binding and that the President and National Assembly had breached the Constitution insofar as they had failed to implement it.

In the wake of EFF I, opposition parties lodged several motions of no confidence in Zuma under section 102 of the Constitution (including one conducted by secret ballot in the wake of the Constitutional Court's June 2017 judgment in United Democratic Movement v Speaker) and one motion to remove him from office under section 89. Each motion was defeated in the National Assembly, which was controlled by Zuma's African National Congress.

== Application ==
Three opposition parties – the EFF, the United Democratic Movement, and the Congress of the People – approached the Constitutional Court directly, arguing that the National Assembly was constitutionally obligated to hold Zuma accountable for failing to implement the Public Protector's report. They sought an order declaring that the National Assembly had failed in this obligation. More specifically, they argued that under section 89(1) of the Constitution, which permitted the National Assembly to impeach the President "on the grounds of a serious violation of the Constitution or the law", the National Assembly was obligated to conduct an inquiry to determine whether President Zuma's conduct (in respect of the Public Protector's report, and as maligned in EFF I) constituted a "serious violation" of the Constitution.

The Constitutional Court heard the matter on 5 September 2017, with Tembeka Ngcukaitobi representing the EFF and Dali Mpofu representing the United Democratic Movement and Congress of the People. The DA was joined as an intervening party, seeking the same relief as the applicants, and the non-profit Corruption Watch was admitted as amicus curiae. Although the applicants cited President Zuma as the second respondent, no order was sought against him and he did not participate in the proceedings; the application was opposed by the Speaker of the National Assembly in her capacity as representative of the legislature. Judgment was handed down on 29 December 2017.

== Majority judgment ==
The court was unanimous in holding that the matter fell within its exclusive jurisdiction under section 167(4)(e) of the Constitution, insofar as it concerned an alleged failure by Parliament to fulfil its constitutional obligations. On the other legal questions, however, the court was split seven to four. Justice Chris Jafta wrote for the majority with the concurrence of Justices Edwin Cameron, Johan Froneman, Nonkosi Mhlantla, and Leona Theron, as well as of Acting Justices Fayeeza Kathree-Setiloane and Jody Kollapen. The majority granted the opposition parties' application, holding that the National Assembly had failed in two of its constitutional obligations under sections 89 and 42 of the Constitution: it had failed to make rules to regulate the section 89(1) impeachment process, and it had failed to determine whether President Zuma had committed impeachable conduct in terms of section 89(1).

The majority's reasoning turned on its view that the National Assembly was obliged to pre-determine what constituted "a serious violation of the Constitution or the law" for the purposes of impeachment under section 89(1). Members could not be left to interpret this provision subjectively when voting on a motion to impeach; instead, any impeachment motion must begin with an "investigation or some other form of an inquiry" to establish objectively whether grounds for impeachment exist. In the case of Zuma's violation of the Constitution in respect of the Nkandla report, the National Assembly had not conducted any such investigation, so the failed motion to impeach Zuma had not complied with section 89. Moreover, the National Assembly had not at any point formulated any institutional rules for the conduct of such investigations.

== Other judgments ==
Deputy Chief Justice Raymond Zondo wrote a dissenting opinion, in which Chief Justice Mogoeng Mogoeng, Justice Mbuyiseli Madlanga, and Acting Justice Dumisani Zondi concurred. Zondo disagreed with the majority about the requirements of section 89, finding that the identification of a "serious violation of the Constitution" was a value judgment that must be left to individual Members of Parliament rather than subject to institutional pre-determination. He therefore agreed with the Speaker that existing rules of the National Assembly – such as the recourse to establish ad hoc committees – were sufficient to enable the fulfilment of the legislature's impeachment function under section 89, and that the National Assembly had already fulfilled its obligation to hold Zuma accountable for his conduct in respect of the Nkandla report. Moreover, Zondo held that there was no basis for the Constitutional Court to order the National Assembly to carry out a section 89 impeachment process to hold Zuma accountable: as set out in EFF I, the court had the authority to say whether the National Assembly had fulfilled its constitutional obligations but not the authority to prescribe how the National Assembly should do so.

Chief Justice Mogoeng Mogoeng wrote that the majority judgment was "a textbook case of judicial overreach".

Mogoeng also wrote a separate dissenting judgment on the separation of powers, calling the majority judgment "a textbook case of judicial overreach – a constitutionally impermissible intrusion by the Judiciary into the exclusive domain of Parliament." Froneman, in turn, wrote a separate judgment which concurred in Jafta's judgment and defended it against Mogoeng's allegation of judicial overreach; all the judges who had joined Jafta's judgment (Justices Jafta, Cameron, Kathree-Setiloane, Kollapen, Mhlantla, and Theron) concurred in Froneman's judgment.

== Reception ==
Mogoeng's vociferous dissent attracted media attention, especially after Mogoeng "noticeably interrupted" Jafta's reading of the majority judgment to pass a note requesting that his own opinion should be read into the record in full. The EFF's Mbuyiseni Ndlozi condemned Mogoeng for "fight[ing] [with Jafta] in full view of cameras", and EFF leader Julius Malema said on Twitter that it was "unacceptable" conduct. However, several legal commentators gave credence to Mogoeng's view that the majority judgment encroached on the separation of powers, and some openly criticised it as an example of the "judicialisation of politics", relying on a "strained" interpretation of the Constitution.
