= SATAWU v Garvas =

South African legal case

- Court: Constitutional Court of South Africa
- Full case name: South African Transport and Allied Workers Union and Another v Garvas and Others
- Decided: 13 June 2012
- Docket nos.: CCT 112/11
- Citations: [2012] ZACC 13; 2012 (8) BCLR 840 (CC); [2012] 10 BLLR 959 (CC); (2012) 33 ILJ 1593 (CC); 2013 (1) SA 83 (CC)

Case history
- Prior actions: Supreme Court of Appeal – SATAWU v Garvis and Others [2011] ZASCA 152; High Court of South Africa, Western Cape Division – Garvis and Others v SATAWU [2010] ZAWCHC 175

Court membership
- Judges sitting: Mogoeng CJ, Yacoob ADCJ, Cameron J, Froneman J, Jafta J, Khampepe J, Nkabinde J, Skweyiya J, van der Westhuizen J, Maya AJ and Zondo AJ

Case opinions
- Section 11(2) of the Regulation of Gatherings Act 205 of 1993 is consistent with section 17 of the Constitution.
- Decision by: Mogoeng CJ (Yacoob, Cameron, Froneman, Khampepe, Maya, Nkabinde, Skweyiya and van der Westhuizen concurring)
- Concurrence: Jafta J (Zondo concurring)

Keywords
- Delictual liability; freedom of assembly; political parties; protest; rationality of legislation; Regulation of Gatherings Act; section 17 of the Constitution

In South African Transport and Allied Workers Union and Another v Garvas and Others, the Constitutional Court of South Africa dismissed a constitutional challenge to section 11 of the Regulation of Gatherings Act 205 of 1993. The relevant provisions of the act widen the circumstances in which persons can be held liable for riot damage incurred during public gatherings which they have organised. The Constitutional Court conceded that these provisions created a chilling effect, thereby limiting the constitutional right to freedom of assembly, but it held that this rights limitation is reasonable and justifiable.

The case arose from a May 2006 protest march in Cape Town, organised by the South African Transport and Allied Workers' Union, which turned violent and resulted in significant property damage. The Constitutional Court handed down judgment on 13 June 2012, with Chief Justice Mogoeng Mogoeng writing for the majority.

== Background ==
=== May 2006 protest ===
On 16 May 2006 in the centre of Cape Town, the South African Transport and Allied Workers' Union (SATAWU), a registered trade union and an affiliate of the Congress of South African Trade Unions (Cosatu), organised a protest march to demonstrate solidarity with a protracted strike of its members in the security sector. The march constituted a gathering as defined by the Regulation of Gatherings Act 205 of 1993 (RGA), and SATAWU met the act's various procedural requirements, including providing notice of the gathering and appointing marshals to manage the crowd. Despite these measures, the march resulted in an estimated R1.5 million in riot damage to vehicles and shops along the route; several people were injured and 39 were arrested.

In the aftermath, SATAWU was sued in the High Court of South Africa for damages sustained as a result of the violence. The eight plaintiffs included three persons who owned shops in the city centre that had allegedly been vandalised and looted during the march; the first-named plaintiff, Jacqueline Garvas (spelled Garvis in lower court proceedings), owned and operated a small business which sold bags. The other five plaintiffs were individuals whose vehicles were allegedly damaged during the march. They brought suit under section 11(1) of the RGA, which provides that the convening organisation of any gathering may be held liable for riot damage which occurs as a result of a gathering held under its auspices.

=== Constitutional challenge ===
Defending against the plaintiffs' claim in the High Court, SATAWU denied liability under subsection 11(1) of the RGA. However, as an alternative defence, it also entered a challenge to the constitutionality of subsection 11(2) of the RGA, which creates a limited defence against the liability created by subsection 11(1). Section 11(2) reads:

It shall be a defence to a claim against a person or organization contemplated in subsection (1) if such a person or organization proves— that he or it did not permit or connive at the act or omission which caused the damage in question; and that the act or omission in question did not fall within the scope of the objectives of the gathering or demonstration in question and was not reasonably foreseeable; and that he or it took all reasonable steps within his or its power to prevent the act or omission in question: Provided that proof that he or it forbade an act of the kind in question shall not by itself be regarded as sufficient proof that he or it took all reasonable steps to prevent the act in question.

SATAWU objected in particular to the inclusion of the phrase "and was not reasonably foreseeable" in subsection 11(2)(b); it argued that this phrase places an undue burden on trade unions and other groups which intend to assemble in public protest. First, it argued that subsection 11(2)(b) makes it logically impossible to mount a defence under section 11(2): a defensible act or omission may not be reasonably foreseeable, but the organisers of a gathering must take "all reasonable steps" to prevent such act or omission, meaning that the organiser must act to prevent an eventuality that it did not foresee and could not reasonably have been expected to foresee. Second, SATAWU argued that personal injury or property damage is a foreseeable possibility in the case of almost all gatherings. Thus, SATAWU contended that section 11(2) does not provide a viable defence to the organisers of public gatherings, and that those organisers are therefore exposed to extensive liability under the RGA. It argued that this situation has a chilling effect on the exercise of freedom of assembly, which is protected in section 17 of the Constitution of South Africa.

== Prior action ==
By agreement between the parties, the Western Cape High Court severed the constitutional challenge from other matters of dispute. The Minister of Safety and Security joined the plaintiffs in opposing SATAWU's constitutional argument. High Court Judge President John Hlophe handed down judgment on the constitutional question on 9 September 2010, finding that subsection 11(2)(b) of the RGA was consistent with section 17 of the Constitution.

SATAWU appealed to the Supreme Court of Appeal, which dismissed the appeal in a unanimous judgment written by Judge of Appeal Mahomed Navsa. SATAWU appealed again to the Constitutional Court of South Africa, where it was represented by Wim Trengove during a hearing on 9 February 2012. The City of Cape Town joined proceedings as an intervening party, and the Freedom of Expression Institute was admitted as amicus curiae.

== Judgment ==
Handing down judgment on 13 June 2012, Chief Justice Mogoeng Mogoeng dismissed SATAWU's appeal, upholding the decision of the High Court and Supreme Court. The court dismissed SATAWU's argument that the unforeseeability requirement makes section 11(2) of the RGA irrational, holding that section 11(2) provides "for a viable, yet onerous, defence". It also dismissed SATAWU's argument that section 11(2) has a chilling effect that is incompatible with the Constitution.

In this respect, Mogoeng agreed with SATAWU that section 11(2), read with section 11(1), "significantly increases the costs of organising protest action", creating a chilling effect, deterring gatherings, and limiting the constitutional right to freedom of assembly. The court therefore proceeded to a limitations exercise to ascertain whether the rights limitation is justifiable under section 36 of the Constitution. In this regard, Mogoeng discussed the importance of freedom of assembly to any constitutional democracy, redoubled by South Africa's apartheid history of political suppression; however, he noted that section 11 of the RGA also served an important and legitimate purpose, aiming "to protect members of society" from riot damage. Mogoeng wrote:

The fact that every right must be exercised with due regard to the rights of others cannot be overemphasised. The organization always has a choice between exercising the right to assemble and cancelling the gathering in the light of the reasonably foreseeable damage. By contrast, the victims of riot damage do not have any choice in relation to what happens to them or their belongings. For this reason, the decision to exercise the right to assemble is one that only the organization may take. This must always be done with the consciousness of any foreseeable harm that may befall others as a consequence of the gathering. The organizers must therefore always reflect on and reconcile themselves with the risk of a violation of the rights of innocent bystanders which could result from forging ahead with the gathering... Whilst the Act does have a chilling effect on the exercise of the right [to freedom of assembly], this should not be overstated. The Act does not negate the right to freedom of assembly, but merely subjects the exercise of that right to strict conditions, in a way designed to moderate or prevent damage to property or injury to people.

Finding that no less restrictive means are available to achieve the objects of section 11 of the RGA, the court concluded that the RGA's limitation on the right to assemble is reasonable and justifiable. Section 11 is therefore consistent with the Constitution.

Mogoeng's majority judgment was joined by Acting Deputy Chief Justice Zak Yacoob, Acting Justice Mandisa Maya, and Justices Edwin Cameron, Johan Froneman, Sisi Khampepe, Bess Nkabinde, Thembile Skweyiya, and Johann van der Westhuizen. Justice Chris Jafta wrote a separate concurring judgment, in which Acting Justice Raymond Zondo joined. Jafta agreed that the appeal should be dismissed, but at an earlier stage of argumentation: he found that section 11(2) of the RGA does not implicate or limit any of the rights entrenched in section 17 of the Constitution.

== Reception ==
Stu Woolman was highly critical of the Constitutional Court's judgment, arguing that it – and both lower courts – severely underestimated the social cost of limiting freedom of assembly in order to protect other individual rights. For Woolman, "The right to assemble places a sometimes exacting toll on the state and other members of society. But it is a price worth paying."
