= List of Constitutional Court opinions of Mogoeng Mogoeng =

Mogoeng Mogoeng served in the Constitutional Court of South Africa from his appointment in October 2009 until his retirement in October 2021. He was appointed as the Chief Justice of South Africa on 8 September 2011.

== Majority opinions ==
No.	Case name	Citation	Notes
1	Malachi v Cape Dance Academy International	[2010] ZACC 13	Unanimous.
2	Viking Pony Africa Pumps v Hidro-Tech Systems	[2010] ZACC 21	Unanimous.
3	Betlane v Shelly Court	[2010] ZACC 23	Unanimous.
4	Malachi v Cape Dance Academy International (No. 2)	[2010] ZACC 24	Unanimous.
5	Viking Pony Africa Pumps v Hydro-Tech Systems (No. 2)	[2011] ZACC 5	Unanimous.
6	Minister for Safety and Security v Van der Merwe	[2011] ZACC 19	Unanimous.
7	F v Minister of Safety and Security	[2011] ZACC 37	
8	South African Transport and Allied Workers Union v Garvas	[2012] ZACC 13	
9	Oriani-Ambrosini v Sisulu	[2012] ZACC 27	
10	Agri South Africa v Minister for Minerals and Energy	[2013] ZACC 9	
11	Government of the Republic of Zimbabwe v Fick	[2013] ZACC 22	
12	Helen Suzman Foundation v President; Glenister v President	[2014] ZACC 32	
13	Sarrahwitz v Martiz	[2015] ZACC 14	
14	Economic Freedom Fighters v Speaker; Democratic Alliance v Speaker	[2016] ZACC 11	Unanimous.
15	Electoral Commission v Mhlope	[2016] ZACC 15	
16	City of Tshwane v Afriforum	[2016] ZACC 19	
17	South African Revenue Service v Commission for Conciliation, Mediation and Arbitration	[2016] ZACC 38	Unanimous.
18	Electronic Media Network Limited v e.tv	[2017] ZACC 17	
19	United Democratic Movement v Speaker	[2017] ZACC 21	Unanimous.
20	AfriForum v University of the Free State	[2017] ZACC 48	
21	My Vote Counts v Minister of Justice and Correctional Services	[2018] ZACC 17	
22	Law Society of South Africa v President	[2018] ZACC 51	
23	Freedom of Religion v Minister of Justice and Constitutional Development	[2019] ZACC 34	Unanimous.
24	President v Democratic Alliance	[2019] ZACC 35	
25	Independent Institute of Education v Kwazulu-Natal Law Society	[2019] ZACC 47	
26	Economic Freedom Fighters v Minister of Justice and Correctional Services	[2020] ZACC 25	
27	Competition Commission v Mediclinic Southern Africa	[2021] ZACC 35	
