= Competition Commission v Mediclinic Southern Africa =

South African legal case

- Court: Constitutional Court of South Africa
- Full case name: Competition Commission of South Africa v Mediclinic Southern Africa (Pty) Ltd and Another
- Decided: 15 October 2021
- Docket nos.: CCT 31/20
- Citations: [2021] ZACC 35; 2022 (5) BCLR 532 (CC); 2022 (4) SA 323 (CC); [2023] 1 CPLR 2 (CC); [2022] HIPR 200 (CC)

Case history
- Appealed from: Competition Appeal Court – Mediclinic Southern Africa (Pty) Ltd and Another v Competition Commission [2020] ZACAC 3

Court membership
- Judges sitting: Mogoeng CJ, Jafta J, Khampepe J, Madlanga J, Majidt J, Mhlantla J, Theron J, Tshiqi J, Pillay AJ and Tlaletsi AJ

Case opinions
- Decision by: Mogoeng CJ (Jafta, Madlanga, Majiedt, Mhlantla, Tshiqi, Pillay and Tlaletsi concurring)
- Dissent: Theron J (Khampepe concurring)

Keywords
- Competition Act, 1998, section 12A; merger; substantial lessening of competition; section 39(2) of the Constitution

Competition Commission of South Africa v Mediclinic Southern Africa (Pty) Ltd and Another is an important decision in South African competition law. It was decided by the Constitutional Court of South Africa on 15 October 2021 with a majority decision written by Chief Justice Mogoeng Mogoeng.

The Constitutional Court affirmed a 2019 decision by the Competition Tribunal to prohibit a proposed merger between Mediclinic Southern Africa and Matlosana Medical Health Services. In doing so, it overturned a judgment of the Competition Appeal Court, which it found had improperly interfered in the tribunal's decision and which had not fulfilled its constitutional obligation to interpret the Competition Act, 1998 in a manner that promotes the Bill of Rights.

== Background ==
The case concerned a proposed merger transaction in terms of which Mediclinic Southern Africa (the first respondent) would acquire a controlling share in Matlosana Medical Health Services (the second respondent). Mediclinic, a major private healthcare company, owned a large number of multidisciplinary hospitals in South Africa, including one in Potchefstroom in the North West Province; Matlosana owned two in nearby Klerksdorp, the Wilmed Park and Sunningdale Hospitals. The case concerned the possible impact on access to healthcare for residents of that region were Mediclinic to gain control of all three hospitals.

An assessment by the Competition Tribunal of the Competition Commission found that the proposed transaction would likely result in a significant increase in tariffs at the Wilmed Park and Sunningdale, making those facilities less accessible to uninsured patients. Unconvinced by Mediclinic's argument that the tariff increase would be offset by certain efficiencies, the Competition Tribunal regarded this as an adverse effect on the public interest with no countervailing positive service to the public interest. Thus, on 29 January 2019, the Competition Tribunal prohibited the proposed merger in terms of powers granted to it by the Competition Act, 1998.

Mediclinic and Matlosana appealed the Competition Tribunal's decision to the Competition Appeal Court, which, in February 2020, upheld the appeal, overturning the tribunal's prohibition; Judge of Appeal Owen Rogers wrote for the majority. The Competition Tribunal, in turn, appealed the court's decision to the Constitutional Court of South Africa, which heard argument on 11 March 2021.

== Majority judgment ==
The Constitutional Court delivered judgment on 15 October 2021. In a judgment written by Chief Justice Mogoeng Mogoeng, an eight-member majority of the court ruled in favour of the Competition Tribunal, setting aside the Competition Appeal Court's order and reinstating the tribunal's 2019 prohibition against the merger. The majority's determination revolved around one central issue, which Mogoeng phrased as the question of whether the Competition Appeal Court "was, in law, entitled to interfere with the findings and remedy of the Tribunal" in this case. The majority held that it was not so entitled: the Competition Tribunal had assessed the likely consequences of the proposed merger, and, as an appellate court, the Competition Appeal Court was not empowered to interfere with the conclusions of that assessment "unless it could demonstrate that this is a case where a material misdirection had been committed by the Tribunal". Indeed, complimenting the rigour of the Tribunal's assessment, Mogoeng criticised the Competition Appeal Court for failing to respect "the Tribunal’s specialist character and thorough grasp of economic, financial and policy issues". Thus:

In sum, all the key issues on which this matter turns were comprehensively and methodically analysed and sound reasons advanced in support of the findings made. That the Competition Appeal Court saw the issues somewhat differently or holds the view that the Tribunal "erred", is not the test. The issue is whether the Tribunal, a specialist adjudicator which had embarked on a probabilistic investigation before it gave a predictive decision, misdirected itself or was clearly wrong in its key findings and did commit a material misdirection with regard to remedy. And the answer is NO!

Mogoeng also held that the Competition Appeal Court's own assessment of the merger was legally erroneous. Where section 12A of the Competition Act required a determination as to the effect of the proposed merger on competition, the Competition Appeal Court had used "the enhancement of market power" as a measure of competition; but Mogoeng held that the standard measure of competition effects was the potential increase in consumer prices. More importantly, the Competition Appeal Court failed to read section 12A of the Competition Act in line with section 39(2) of the Constitution, which enjoins all courts to interpret legislation in a manner that promotes the Bill of Rights.

== Minority judgment ==
Justice Leona Theron filed a dissenting opinion, holding that the Constitutional Court lacked jurisdiction to hear the appeal. Justice Sisi Khampepe concurred in Theron's dissent.

== Reception ==
The Center for Economic and Social Rights welcomed the judgment, describing it as closely aligned with a "rights-based economy" approach. Other commentators were highly critical, describing the court's reasoning as "bizarre" and lamenting the court's attempt "to import constitutional rights into competition law, without adequately engaging with competition law itself".
