= UDM v Speaker of the National Assembly =

South African legal case

- Court: Constitutional Court of South Africa
- Full case name: United Democratic Movement v Speaker of the National Assembly and Others
- Decided: 22 June 2017
- Docket nos.: CCT 89/17
- Citations: [2017] ZACC 21; 2017 (8) BCLR 1061 (CC); 2017 (5) SA 300 (CC)

Court membership
- Judges sitting: Mogoeng CJ, Nkabinde ADJC, Cameron J, Froneman J, Jafta J, Khampepe J, Madlanga J, Mhlantla J, Zondo J, Mojapelo AJ and Pretorius AJ

Case opinions
- The Speaker of the National Assembly has the constitutional power to prescribe a secret ballot in a parliamentary motion of no confidence in the President of the Republic.
- Decision by: Mogoeng CJ (unanimous)

Keywords
- Accountability; conscience vote; motion of no confidence; National Assembly; Rules of the National Assembly; secret ballot; section 55 of the Constitution; section 57 of the Constitution; section 102 of the Constitution; separation of powers; Speaker of the National Assembly

United Democratic Movement v Speaker of the National Assembly and Others is a 2017 decision of the Constitutional Court of South Africa on the purpose and procedure of parliamentary motions of no confidence in the President of the Republic of South Africa. In a unanimous judgment written by Chief Justice Mogoeng Mogoeng, the court held that the Speaker of the National Assembly was empowered to prescribe a secret ballot in votes of no confidence.

== Background and application ==
In the early hours of 31 March 2017, President Jacob Zuma announced a major reshuffle of his cabinet. Among those fired were respected Finance Minister Pravin Gordhan and his deputy, Mcebisi Jonas. Coming amid broader allegations of state capture in Zuma's administration, the cabinet reshuffle was met with an adverse reaction from the markets and from much of the public, including in the so-called Zuma Must Fall protests.

In this context, three opposition parties – the United Democratic Movement (UDM), the Democratic Alliance, and the Economic Freedom Fighters – approached the Speaker of the National Assembly, Baleka Mbete, with a request to schedule a motion of no confidence in the President, as provided for in section 102 of the Constitution. The motion was scheduled for debate in the National Assembly on 18 April 2017. In the interim, the UDM wrote to the Speaker with the further request that the vote on the motion should be conducted by secret ballot. On 5 April, the Speaker refused, arguing that neither the Constitution nor the Rules of the National Assembly empowered her to order such a voting procedure in a motion of no confidence.

In response, the UDM applied for direct access to the Constitutional Court of South Africa, where it sought judicial review of the Speaker's decision. Four lobby groups were admitted as amici curiae, and all political parties represented in the National Assembly were joined to the proceedings. Counsel for the litigants included Dali Mpofu for the UDM, Tembeka Ngcukaitobi for the Economic Freedom Fighters, and Anton Katz for Inkatha Freedom Party. The matter was heard on 15 May 2017 and judgment was handed down on 22 June 2017.

== Judgment ==
In a unanimous judgment written by Chief Justice Mogoeng Mogoeng, the Constitutional Court held that the Constitution does not provide for or require any express procedure for a vote of no confidence; either a secret ballot or an open ballot is permissible, at the discretion of the Speaker and in the public interest. The reason for this is section 57(1) of the Constitution, which grants the National Assembly the latitude to determine its own internal arrangements and rules "with due regard to representative and participatory democracy, accountability, transparency and public involvement". The court therefore set aside the Speaker's decision of 6 April, but it declined to prescribe a secret ballot; instead, it remitted the UDM's request for a secret ballot to the Speaker, who was to make a fresh determination in light of the ruling.

In the rest of its judgment, the court reflected on the purpose of motions of no confidence, which it construed as the "ultimate" means available to Parliament for exerting accountability over the executive. Given this purpose of accountability, the Speaker's choice among voting methods would be situation-dependent but should rationally include consideration inter alia of the competing imperatives of facilitating openness and transparency, on the one hand, and allowing Members of Parliament to exercise their vote "in accordance with [their] conscience, without undue influence, intimidation, or fear of disapproval", on the other hand.
