= List of Constitutional Court opinions of Bess Nkabinde =

Bess Nkabinde served in the Constitutional Court of South Africa from January 2006 until her retirement in December 2017.

== Majority opinions ==
| No. | Case name | Citation | Notes |
|---|---|---|---|
| 1 | SABC v National Director of Public Prosecutions | [2006] ZACC 15 | Co-written with Langa, Kondile, Madala, O'Regan, Van Heerden and Yacoob. |
| 2 | Prophet v National Director of Public Prosecutions | [2006] ZACC 17 | |
| 3 | Masiya v Director of Public Prosecutions (Pretoria) | [2007] ZACC 9 | |
| 4 | Van Der Merwe v Taylor | [2007] ZACC 16 | Co-written with Moseneke. |
| 5 | S v Molimi | [2008] ZACC 2 | |
| 6 | Equity Aviation Services v Commission for Conciliation, Mediation and Arbitration | [2008] ZACC 16 | |
| 7 | Hassam v Jacobs | [2009] ZACC 19 | |
| 8 | Reflect-All 1025 v MEC for Public Transport, Roads and Works, Gauteng | [2009] ZACC 24 | |
| 9 | Poverty Alleviation Network v President | [2010] ZACC 5 | |
| 10 | Van Vuren v Minister of Correctional Services | [2010] ZACC 17 | |
| 11 | Governing Body of the Juma Musjid Primary School v Essay | [2011] ZACC 13 | |
| 12 | South African Police Service v Police and Prisons Civil Rights Union | [2011] ZACC 21 | |
| 13 | Pheko v Ekurhuleni Metropolitan Municipality (No. 1) | [2011] ZACC 34 | |
| 14 | Wiese v Government Employees Pension Fund | [2012] ZACC 5 | |
| 15 | SATAWU v Moloto | [2012] ZACC 19 | Co-written with Yacoob and Froneman. |
| 16 | Lee v Minister of Correctional Services | [2012] ZACC 30 | |
| 17 | Association of Regional Magistrates of Southern Africa v President | [2013] ZACC 13 | |
| 18 | Coetzee v National Commissioner of Police | [2013] ZACC 29 | |
| 19 | Mansingh v General Council of the Bar | [2013] ZACC 40 | |
| 20 | Botha v Rich | [2014] ZACC 11 | |
| 21 | Stopforth Swanepoel & Brewis v Royal Anthem Investments | [2014] ZACC 26 | |
| 22 | Pheko v Ekurhuleni Metropolitan Municipality (No. 2) | [2015] ZACC 10 | |
| 23 | Horn v LA Health Medical Scheme | [2015] ZACC 13 | |
| 24 | Acting Speaker of the National Assembly v Teddy Bear Clinic | [2015] ZACC 16 | |
| 25 | My Vote Counts v Speaker of the National Assembly | [2015] ZACC 31 | Co-written with Khampepe, Madlanga, and Theron. |
| 26 | Pitje v Shibambo | [2016] ZACC 5 | |
| 27 | Molusi v Voges | [2016] ZACC 6 | |
| 28 | Pheko v Ekurhuleni Metropolitan Municipality (No. 3) | [2016] ZACC 20 | |
| 29 | Jimmale v S | [2016] ZACC 27 | |
| 30 | AB v Minister of Social Development | [2016] ZACC 43 | |
| 31 | Ekurhuleni Metropolitan Municipality v Germiston Municipal Retirement Fund | [2017] ZACC 1 | |
| 32 | Matjhabeng Local Municipality v Eskom; Mkhonto v Compensation Solutions | [2017] ZACC 35 | |
| 33 | Public Servants Association v Department of Health, Gauteng | [2017] ZACC 45 | |
