= Economic Freedom Fighters v Speaker of the National Assembly =

2016 South African legal case

EFF v Speaker; DA v Speaker
- Court: Constitutional Court of South Africa
- Full case name: Economic Freedom Fighters v Speaker of the National Assembly and Others; Democratic Alliance v Speaker of the National Assembly and Others
- Decided: 31 March 2016
- Docket nos.: CCT 143/15; CCT 171/15
- Citations: [2016] ZACC 11; 2016 (5) BCLR 618 (CC); 2016 (3) SA 580 (CC)

Case history
- Related action: Economic Freedom Fighters and Others v Speaker of the National Assembly and Another [2017] ZACC 47

Court membership
- Judges sitting: Mogoeng CJ, Moseneke DCJ, Bosielo AJ, Cameron J, Froneman J, Jafta J, Khampepe J, Madlanga J, Mhlantla J, Nkabinde J, Zondo J

Case opinions
- Recommendations of the Public Protector are binding unless set aside by a court. President Jacob Zuma and the National Assembly breached the Constitution by failing to implement the Nkandla report.
- Decision by: Mogoeng CJ (unanimous)

Keywords
- Exclusive jurisdiction; President's conduct; Public Protector's powers; Public Protector's remedial action; National Assembly's obligations; separation of powers

Economic Freedom Fighters v Speaker of the National Assembly and Others; Democratic Alliance v Speaker of the National Assembly and Others [2016] ZACC 11 is an important judgment of the Constitutional Court of South Africa which finds that President Jacob Zuma breached the South African Constitution by failing to implement the recommendations in the Public Protector's Nkandla report.

== Background ==
In 2009, during President Zuma's first term, his Nkandla homestead was extensively renovated and upgraded. The Presidency said these were lawful security upgrades. However, it soon emerged that the upgrades included non-security features like a swimming pool and cattle kraal. The Public Protector, Thuli Madonsela, began an investigation into the apparent misuse of state resources. On 19 March 2014, she released her so-called Nkandla report, which found that some of the upgrades were unlawful and recommended that President Zuma pay back the money used for them.

The report proved highly controversial, as Zuma and his ANC government refused to act on it and questioned its legitimacy. On three occasions during 2014, the Presidency wrote letters to the Public Protector taking a skeptical attitude to the report. On 14 August 2014 Zuma said he would allow Parliament, and the Minister of Police, to determine what remedial steps, if any, he should take. He later denied that the Public Protector's recommendations were legally binding. Zuma's evasiveness led to severe and widespread criticism, including by opposition parties the Economic Freedom Fighters and Democratic Alliance. EFF MPs frequently interrupted parliamentary proceedings to demand that Zuma "pay back the money", leading to confrontations between them and Speaker of the National Assembly Baleka Mbete, considered by some to be partial to Zuma in her management of parliamentary proceedings. On one such occasion, at Zuma's 2015 State of the Nation address, these interruptions led to brawl between MPs and security personnel and a subsequent court action (which was decided against the government). When Zuma appeared in Parliament he repeatedly ignored or laughed off questions about Nkandla. Eventually the EFF announced, in May 2015, that it would file a court application to compel Zuma to act on the Public Protector's report. The DA filed a similar application shortly thereafter.

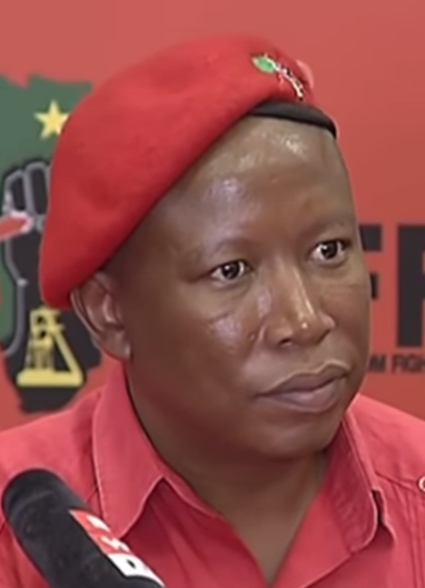
The EFF's Julius Malema, who led many of the parliamentary protests against President Zuma but eventually opted for litigation.

As anticipated, the ANC-controlled National Assembly constituted an ad hoc committee to conduct a parallel investigative process led by Minister of Police Nathi Nhleko, whose report, released in August 2015, purported to "exonerate" Zuma. This report was adopted by Parliament on 18 August 2015. On this basis, Zuma continued to ignore the Public Protector's recommendations.

On 8 October 2015 the Supreme Court of Appeal of South Africa handed down a judgment in a separate matter (namely SABC v DA, about the Hlaudi Motsoeneng saga) that found the Public Protector's reports are legally binding. In doing so the Court reversed the High Court, whose judgment on 24 October 2014 had said the reports are merely advisory.

== Hearing ==
A week before the hearing, the Presidency made a surprise attempt to settle the matter and compiled a draft order offering to pay back some of the money. The Public Protector noted that the draft order reflected only "partial" compliance with her recommendations. The EFF made a counter-offer in the form of a draft order stating that the Nkandla report was legally binding on Zuma and that by failing to implement it he had breached the South African Constitution and his oath of office. The parties failed to reach a settlement.

The hearing took place on 9 February 2016. At it, Zuma's counsel, Jeremy Gauntlett SC, made a series of major concessions, including that the Nkandla report was binding on Zuma, but asked the Court not to declare that Zuma had acted unconstitutionally. The issue was significant because such a declaration would be a basis for Zuma's impeachment. Zuma's strategy was perceived as an attempt to evade responsibility and throw his ministers under the bus. Minister Nhleko's legal team, in turn, said his "hands were tied" because he was following instructions from Zuma and the National Assembly. Only Speaker Baleka Mbete's counsel, Lindi Nkosi-Thomas SC, seriously disputed the EFF and DA's account of the facts and law, but was ultimately forced to capitulate and was widely mocked for her "bumbling" performance.

== Judgment ==
The Constitutional Court's unanimous judgment was delivered on 31 March 2016 by Chief Justice Mogoeng Mogoeng. It confirms the SCA's holding in SABC v DA that the Public Protector's recommendations are binding. It does this on the basis of a purposive interpretation of the South African Constitution; without the power to make binding recommendations, Mogoeng CJ holds, the Public Protector would be ineffectual:

[The Public Protector's] investigative powers are not supposed to bow down to anybody, not even at the door of the highest chambers of raw State power. The predicament though is that mere allegations and investigation of improper or corrupt conduct against all, especially powerful public office-bearers, are generally bound to attract a very unfriendly response. An unfavourable finding of unethical or corrupt conduct coupled with remedial action, will probably be strongly resisted in an attempt to repair or soften the inescapable reputational damage. It is unlikely that unpleasant findings and a biting remedial action would be readily welcomed by those investigated. If compliance with remedial action taken were optional, then very few culprits, if any at all, would allow it to have any effect. And if it were, by design, never to have a binding effect, then it is incomprehensible just how the Public Protector could ever be effective in what she does and be able to contribute to the strengthening of our constitutional democracy.

The upshot, according to Mogoeng, is that the Public Protector's recommendations must be implemented unless they are set aside by a court:

When remedial action is binding, compliance is not optional, whatever reservations the affected party might have about its fairness, appropriateness or lawfulness. For this reason, the remedial action taken against those under investigation cannot be ignored without any legal consequences. This is so, because our constitutional order hinges also on the rule of law. No decision grounded on the Constitution or law may be disregarded without recourse to a court of law. To do otherwise would "amount to a licence to self-help". Whether the Public Protector’s decisions amount to administrative action or not, the disregard for remedial action by those adversely affected by it, amounts to taking the law into their own hands and is illegal. No binding and constitutionally or statutorily sourced decision may be disregarded willy-nilly. It has legal consequences and must be complied with or acted upon. To achieve the opposite outcome lawfully, an order of court would have to be obtained.

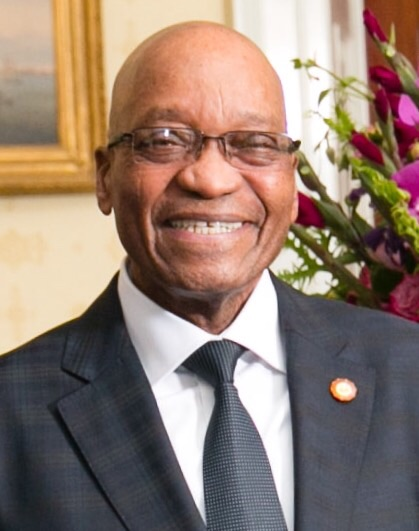
President Jacob Zuma, who was held to have violated the Constitution in the course of the Nkandla scandal.

Since President Zuma ignored the report even without having them set aside, Mogoeng held he had breached the South African Constitution:

The President thus failed to uphold, defend and respect the Constitution as the supreme law of the land. This failure is manifest from the substantial disregard for the remedial action taken against him by the Public Protector in terms of her constitutional powers. The second respect in which he failed relates to his shared section 181(3) obligations. He was duty-bound to, but did not, assist and protect the Public Protector so as to ensure her independence, impartiality, dignity and effectiveness by complying with her remedial action. He might have been following wrong legal advice and therefore acting in good faith. But that does not detract from the illegality of his conduct regard being had to its inconsistency with his constitutional obligations in terms of sections 182(1)(c) and 181(3) read with 83(b).

Mogoeng also found that the National Assembly had acted unlawfully by failing to implement the report:

On a proper construction of its constitutional obligations, the National Assembly was duty-bound to hold the President accountable by facilitating and ensuring compliance with the decision of the Public Protector. The exception would be where the findings and remedial action are challenged and set aside by a court, which was of course not done in this case. Like the President, the National Assembly may, relying for example on the High Court decision in DA v SABC, have been genuinely led to believe that it was entitled to second-guess the remedial action through its resolution absolving the President of liability. But, that still does not affect the unlawfulness of its preferred course of action. Second-guessing the findings and remedial action does not lie in the mere fact of the exculpatory reports of the Minister of Police and the last Ad Hoc Committee. In principle, there may have been nothing wrong with those "parallel" processes. But, there was everything wrong with the National Assembly stepping into the shoes of the Public Protector, by passing a resolution that purported effectively to nullify the findings made and remedial action taken by the Public Protector and replacing them with its own findings and "remedial action". This, the rule of law is dead against.

The Court's order substantially repeated the remedial steps required by the Public Protector. The National Treasury — headed by Pravin Gordhan, who had recently locked horns with Zuma's administration — was ordered, within 60 days, to determine the costs of the non-security upgrades at Nkandla, and the proportion thereof to be repaid by Zuma. The President was ordered to make this repayment within a further 45 days and to "reprimand" the ministers who had overseen the building work.

== Impact ==
Mogoeng's "powerful" and "profound" judgment was hailed as a "triumph for the rule of law", and a major blow to the widely criticised President, of whose conduct the judgment was "scathing". One commentator said Mogoeng's judgment was "his moment of triumph and redemption", and marked his transformation from a supposed "tool" of the establishment to a "national hero" in a manner reminiscent of Earl Warren. Political analyst Steven Friedman said the judgment was "the clearest message yet that the Constitution is working"; another commentator said the judgment's importance was that "it is a muscular assertion that all rule in this country is subject to the Constitution". Former President Thabo Mbeki said the judges of the Constitutional Court should be "salute[d]" for "the meticulous manner in which they discharged their constitutional responsibilities as our apex court". Justice Edwin Cameron, who sat in the case, suggested in a public address that it was one of the Court's two most significant ever judgments. One commentator noted, however, that President Zuma's counsel had conceded most of the points the Court decided against him.

The exception was the Court's declaration that Zuma had breached the Constitution, which was a potential basis for Zuma's impeachment. In the immediate wake of the judgment, Julius Malema and Mmusi Maimane, the leaders of the two victorious applicants in the case, called for Zuma to step down. However, Zuma sought to downplay the judgment. In a press statement the following evening, he said he welcomed the judgment and had always accepted the Public Protector's reports were binding, and noted that the Court found he had been entitled to institute a parallel investigative process and had acted "honestly" and "in good faith". Legal commentators condemned these claims as serious misrepresentations of the judgment. They pointed out that it could not possibly have been the case, as Zuma claimed, that he was merely adopting the High Court's approach to the powers of the Public Protector in its DA v SABC judgment, because that was handed down six weeks after Zuma signaled his intention not to comply with her report. Commentators also condemned the Presidency's statement that the Court had never found Zuma breached his office, since that was the judgment's unmistakable implication.

But the ANC continued to support Zuma. The ANC Women's League had released a statement hours after the judgment saying its faith in Zuma "remains unshaken". Secretary-General Gwede Mantashe, speaking on behalf of the so-called Top Six, said he "welcomed" Zuma's apologetic statement but that calls for his impeachment were "over-exaggerated". Chief whip Jackson Mthembu and Deputy Minister of Justice John Jeffery took the view that, although Zuma had breached the Constitution, the breach was not "serious". The impeachment bid by opposition MPs on 5 April 2016 failed by over 120 votes. Some were surprised that even Zuma's opponents within the ANC like Cyril Ramaphosa and Pravin Gordhan had voted against the motion. The Congress of the People, an opposition party, said it would boycott parliamentary proceedings in light of the National Assembly's failure to implement the Court's judgment.

Nevertheless, many analysts said the judgment might prove a fatal blow to Zuma, although factional battles within the ANC would be the ultimate decider. One suggested that powerful ANC members had lost faith in Zuma and might move to oust him at a more opportune moment. The South African Communist Party, part of Zuma's own tripartite alliance, had been skeptical about the adequacy of his response to the judgment. Some ANC members booed Zuma at his next subsequent appearance. And several prominent members of civil society and former ANC insiders, including Ahmed Kathrada, Ronnie Kasrils, Trevor Manuel, Cheryl Carolus, and retired Constitutional Court judge Zak Yacoob, called for Zuma's resignation, prompting a backlash from certain Zuma allies. The South African Council of Churches did the same, saying Zuma had "lost all moral authority". The Gauteng ANC, led by noted Zuma critic Paul Mashatile, formally resolved that Zuma must resign; doubts were raised about Zuma's leadership even within his traditional strongholds like the ANC's Limpopo branches; and an internal ANC memorandum sent by party veterans to the Top Six allegedly demanded Zuma's recall and compared him to detested apartheid-era President P. W. Botha. Finally, members of the Gupta family, thought to be Zuma's long-standing allies and crucial financial backers, resigned from their major holding company and fled South Africa for Dubai in the week after the judgment – leaving Zuma, in the opinion of some analysts, extremely vulnerable. In the wake of these developments, Malema said it was now time to "crush the head of the snake". On 12 April 2016, Max du Preez said the key question, "now that the balance of power has turned irrevocably against Zuma", was how to ensure he makes a managed — and non-violent — exit.
