= Koffiekraal =

- Location within North West (South African province) Location within South Africa
- Coordinates: 25.277°S 26.422°E
- Country: South Africa
- Province: North West
- District: Bojanala
- Municipality: Moses Kotane

Area
  - Total: 5.41 km^{2} (2.09 sq mi)

Population (2011)
  - Total: 4,282
  - Density: 791/km^{2} (2,050/sq mi)

Racial makeup (2011)
  - Black African: 99.3%
  - Coloured: 0.2%
  - Indian/Asian: 0.3%
  - Other: 0.3%

First languages (2011)
  - Tswana: 95.6%
  - Sign language: 1.1%
  - English: 1.0%
  - Other: 2.3%
- Time zone: UTC+2 (SAST)
- PO box: 2848

Koffiekraal is a village in Bojanala District Municipality in the North West province of South Africa.
