= Silwerkrans =

Silwerkrans Tlokweng
- Location within North West (South African province) Location within South Africa
- Coordinates: 25.499°S 26.630°E
- Country: South Africa
- Province: North West
- District: Bojanala
- Municipality: Moses Kotane

Area
  - Total: 22.61 km^{2} (8.73 sq mi)

Population (2001)
  - Total: 12,124
  - Density: 536.2/km^{2} (1,389/sq mi)

First languages (2001)
  - Tswana: 97.65%
  - Xhosa: 0.54%
  - Sotho: 0.37%
  - Other: 1.44%
- Time zone: UTC+2 (SAST)
- PO box: 2839
- Area code: 014

Silwerkrans (also known as Tlokweng) is a village in Bojanala District Municipality in the North West province of South Africa. The village is occupied by the Batlokwa ba Bogatsu tribe. The Batlokwa are thought to have occupied this village during the 1800s. Dr. Lesedi Monageng II Motsatsi is the current kgosi of Tlokweng village.

== Geography ==
The village is divided into sections mainly aligned by clans (makgotla). Some of the oldest sections are: Rathoane, Rasennelo, Ramolefe, Mokgwa, Siko, Mmaotse, Raseekana, Rakuba, Ramochina, Ramoji, Ramodisa, Raphiri, Lekubung, Monneng, Ledubeng, Rramothibe, Kgosing, Metejwe, Sopeng and Raleoto.

Raleoto extends the village east of the Mase River and consists of subsections, namely Phokojweng, Ranthoakgale, Mothowammona, Masetlheng, Matshelapata, Terateng and Dinngogong. Kolontwane and Mase are two rivers crossing the village from south to north. Kolontwane River is popular for having a waterfall called Metsi-a-wa, which attracts pilgrims who come for spiritual rituals.

== Education ==
Tlokweng has three primary schools and two secondary schools. The primary schools are Bogatsu Primary School, Thakadu Primary School and Mokalake Primary School. The Secondary schools are Kgosibodiba Secondary School and Motlhaputseng High School.

== Religion ==
The village has a rich history of religious activities with the wide practice of Christianity. Tlokweng also has strong traditional and cultural religion. It is still widely common for ancestral practices (ditiro tsa Badimo) to be held within families in the village. Some of the mainstream churches in Tlokweng includes Uniting Lutheran Church (used to be known as RraBedi), Lutheran Church (known as Mahanaim), Zion Christian Church (ZCC), Apostolic Faith Mission, Pentecostal Holiness Church, Roman Catholic Church, International Pentecostal Christian Church (also known as kwa-Modise) and a wide variety of traditional Zionist Churches. Since the early 1990s there has been a wide proliferation of charismatic Christian churches. Some of these churches include El Shadai Ministries and many others using temporary tents as church gathering facility.
