= Mogoeng Mogoeng =

Chief Justice of South Africa

The Honourable Mogoeng Mogoeng

21st Chief Justice of South Africa
- In office 8 September 2011 – 11 October 2021
- Appointed by: Jacob Zuma
- Deputy: Dikgang Moseneke; Bess Nkabinde (acting); Raymond Zondo
- Preceded by: Sandile Ngcobo
- Succeeded by: Ray Zondo

Justice of the Constitutional Court of South Africa
- In office October 2009 – 11 October 2021
- Appointed by: Jacob Zuma

Chancellor of the University of KwaZulu-Natal
- In office 7 August 2017 – 1 April 2021
- Vice-Chancellor: Nana Poku
- Preceded by: Zweli Mkhize
- Succeeded by: Reuel Jethro Khoza

Judge President of the North West High Court
- In office October 2002 – October 2009
- Appointed by: Thabo Mbeki
- Succeeded by: Monica Leeuw

Judge of the North West High Court
- In office June 1997 – October 2009
- Appointed by: Nelson Mandela

Personal details
- Born: 14 January 1961 (age 65) Zeerust, Union of South Africa
- Spouse: Mmaphefo Mogoeng
- Children: 3
- Education: University of Zululand (BJuris); University of Natal (LLB); University of South Africa (LLM)

Mogoeng Thomas Reetsang Mogoeng (born 14 January 1961) is a South African jurist who served as the Chief Justice of South Africa from 8 September 2011 until his retirement on 11 October 2021.

== Early life ==
Mogoeng was born on 14 January 1961 in Goo-Mokgatha (Koffiekraal) village near Zeerust in the North West Province. His father was a miner and his mother a domestic worker. Mogoeng became politically active at high school, from which he was briefly suspended for organising a memorial to the victims of the Soweto uprising.

Mogoeng received a B.Juris in 1983 from the University of Zululand and a Bachelor of Laws in 1985 from the University of Natal. There he had been active in the Azanian Students' Movement during a time of grave repression by the SADF. From 1985 he worked for the government of Bophuthatswana as a High Court prosecutor in Mahikeng; though working for a bantustan was stigmatised, Mogoeng was obliged to do so for five years to repay his government bursary. He obtained a Master of Laws by correspondence from the University of South Africa in 1989.

Mogoeng left Bophuthatswana's civil service the following year to begin practice as an advocate. After a short period at the Johannesburg Bar, Mogoeng returned to Mahikeng, where he practiced for six years. He was the chair of Lawyers for Human Rights' Bophuthatswana chapter and a part-time lecturer at the University of Bophuthatswana (now North-West University).

== Judicial career ==
In 1997, Mogoeng accepted an appointment to the North West High Court, though he had felt initially that he was too inexperienced to be made a judge. He became a judge of the Labour Appeal Court in 2000 and the Judge President of the North West High Court in 2002. In October 2009, in President Jacob Zuma's first raft of judicial appointments, Mogoeng was elevated to the highest court in South Africa, its Constitutional Court. He was appointed simultaneously with Chris Jafta, Sisi Khampepe and Johan Froneman.

=== Nomination as Chief Justice ===
Less than two years later, in mid-2011, Mogoeng was nominated for appointment as Chief Justice. Mogoeng's nomination was extremely controversial, drawing strong criticism from across the political spectrum, including from within President Zuma's own Tripartite Alliance, as well as from the press, local and international civic organizations, legal academics and bar councils.

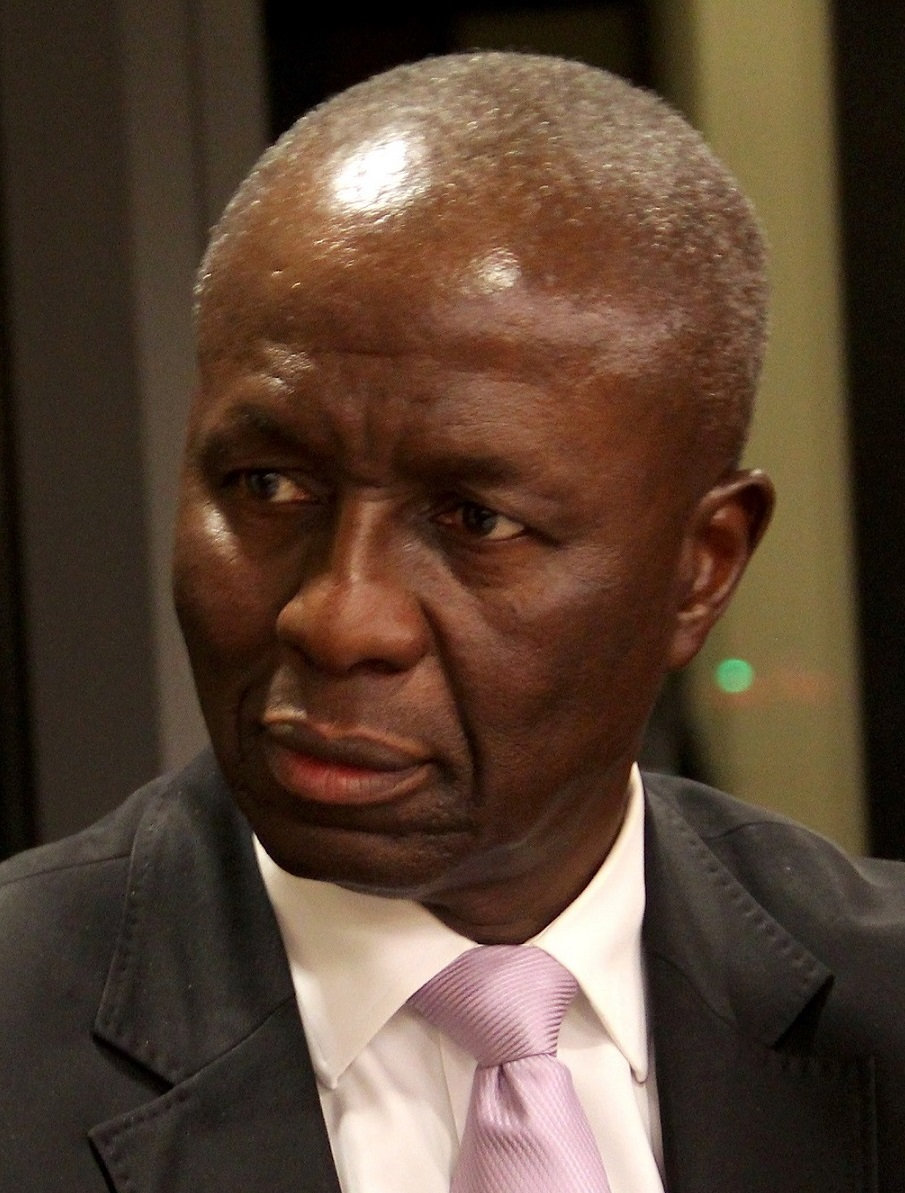
Deputy Chief Justice Dikgang Moseneke, Mogoeng's perceived rival.

Mogoeng was one of the Constitutional Court's most junior members, having been appointed to it less than two years earlier, and having been a relative unknown at one of the smallest High Court divisions prior to that. Besides his general lack of reported judgments, critics noted that he had failed to recuse himself in S v Dube, a case where his wife had appeared as the state prosecutor.

In addition, Mogoeng was nominated ahead of the expected appointee, Dikgang Moseneke, who had served the Constitutional Court for nine years and as Deputy Chief Justice for six. Moseneke had already been overlooked once before, when Sandile Ngcobo was appointed Chief Justice, and his second snubbing was attributed to his Pan Africanist Congress background and remarks at a social occasion distancing himself from the ruling African National Congress (ANC). Mogoeng's own meteoric rise under the Zuma administration raised concerns about his independence. His nomination ahead of Moseneke reminded many of the notorious supersession by L. C. Steyn, a National Party favourite, of Oliver Schreiner. Finally, whereas Moseneke had been active in the struggle against apartheid, COSATU said it was concerning that Mogoeng had been a prosecutor for a bantustan.

But the most widespread concerns were about Mogoeng's judgments in rape and gender-violence cases. The Nobel Women's Initiative accused Mogoeng of invoking dangerous myths about rape and of victim-blaming. Of the many judgments cited by critics in which Mogoeng had been lenient on rapists and domestic assailants, three were emphasised. In State v Sebaeng, Mogoeng reduced the sentence of a child rapist on the basis that he had been non-violent and indeed "tender" in raping the victim. The 2005 case of State v Moipolai involved the rape of a pregnant woman by her long-term boyfriend. Despite several aggravating factors, Mogoeng reduced the man's sentence from ten years' imprisonment to five because the rape was, he said, not as serious as if a stranger had committed it. Finally, in State v Mathebe, Mogoeng reduced the sentence, from two years' imprisonment to a fine of R4,000, of a man who had tied his girlfriend to his car and dragged her 50 meters along a dirt road. Mogoeng's explanation was that the man had been "provoked" by the victim. When these three judgments were raised in a BBC interview, Mogoeng compared his judgments in sexual-assault cases to a game of football, saying it would be wrong to call Manchester United a bad team because it loses three matches in a season.

Legal academic Pierre de Vos said Mogoeng was clearly the most conservative member of the Constitutional Court. He pointed to Mogoeng's ambivalence over gay rights – in Le Roux v Dey Mogoeng dissented, without giving reasons, from paragraphs which said it was not defamatory to call someone gay – and to his dissenting judgment in The Citizen v Robert McBride, which would severely restrict freedom of expression.

=== Interview and appointment ===
Moseneke, as the country's Acting Chief Justice pending a permanent appointment, chaired the Judicial Service Commission (JSC) when it interviewed Mogoeng to determine his suitability. Mogoeng seemed prickly throughout, having to apologize to Moseneke for lashing out at one of his questions. In response, one commissioner told Mogoeng he seemed "arrogant" and unsuited to the position. Commentators said that Mogoeng's conduct at the interview heightened concerns about his judicial temperament. Mogoeng's own view was that he had been "rock solid" at his interview.

Mogoeng's appointment was recommended by the JSC and confirmed by President Zuma on 8 September 2011. The JSC's decision to appoint Mogoeng, despite his many critics, coupled with the partisan conduct of the JSC's political appointees during his interview, suggested to some that the JSC had been captured by political interests.

== Record as Chief Justice ==
=== Separation of powers ===
Criticism of Mogoeng's suitability, and of his close ties with the Zuma administration, continued well after his appointment. But he has been defended by highly respected colleagues, like Kate O'Regan and Edwin Cameron, who described him as a man "of serious purpose, deeply committed to the Constitution", and is now widely thought to have dispelled suspicions that he would be an executive-minded Chief Justice.

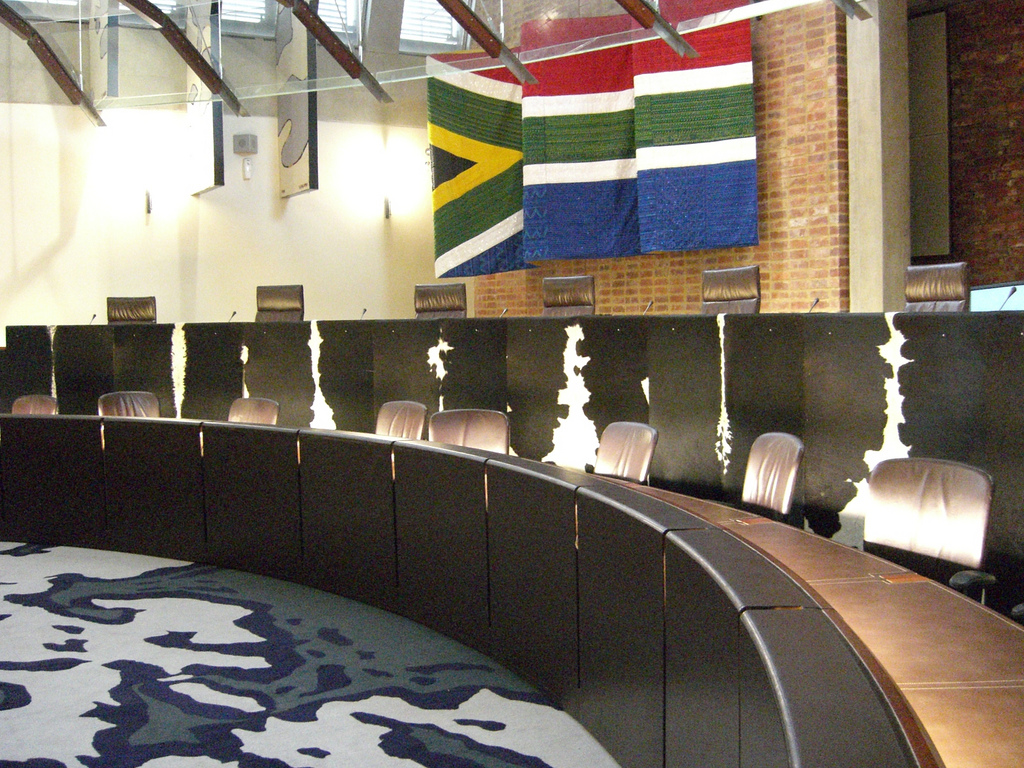
The courtroom of the Constitutional Court of South Africa

In his public addresses he has been "outspoken" and "forthright". He has regularly championed judicial independence and deplored interference by the executive. He has also publicly criticised Minister of Justice Michael Masutha for failing to ensure that the judiciary is autonomous and adequately funded. In June 2015, it emerged that Mogoeng had been the target of two smear campaigns – apparently showing that Mogoeng had, through his outspokenness, "made enemies" in the establishment. The following month, Mogoeng called a meeting of senior judges who released an exceptional press statement "reject[ing]" criticisms of the judiciary made by Gwede Mantashe and Blade Nzimande in the wake of the ANC government's allowing Omar al-Bashir to leave South Africa in contravention of a court order. Mogoeng also requested a meeting with President Zuma to discuss the situation, which Zuma agreed to three weeks later. Mogoeng was widely praised for his "courageous and principled leadership" and his "efforts to protect the independence of the judiciary". One commentator even said "Mogoeng's intervention might one day be seen as one of the courageous acts that saved South Africa's budding democracy".

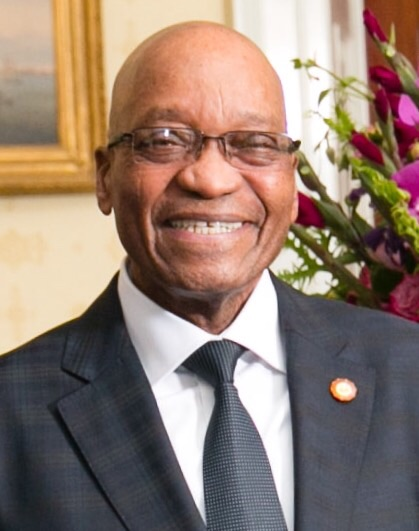
President Jacob Zuma, of whom Mogoeng was widely thought to be an ally when first appointed to the Constitutional Court. But Mogoeng has regularly ruled against Zuma in high-profile cases.

In 2012, Mogoeng upheld a constitutional challenge by Mario Oriani-Ambrosini, of the minority Inkatha Freedom Party, to rules of Parliament that allowed an individual MP to introduce a Bill only if he or she first obtained the majority's approval. Mogoeng also held against the government in the high-profile litigation in Helen Suzman Foundation v President. His majority judgment struck down several sections of the South African Police Service Amendment Act of 2012 (the so-called Hawks Act) on the basis that they did not constitute an "adequately independent" anti-corruption unit. (Other members of the Court would, however, have gone further, and struck down other sections which Mogoeng upheld.) Mogoeng's Court also found against the government in Democratic Alliance v President (per Yacoob ADCJ), setting aside President Zuma's highly controversial appointment of Menzi Simelane as National Director of Public Prosecutions. And in October 2014 his Court handed down judgment in National Commissioner of the SAPS v SALC (per Majiedt AJ) and ordered the South African Police Service to investigate allegations of torture in Zimbabwe committed by and against Zimbabwean nationals. This judgment was hailed as a victory for universal jurisdiction. In its wake, one influential columnist said that those who had expected the Constitutional Court to take a pro-executive turn under Mogoeng had been proved wrong. Finally, in 2016, Mogoeng himself wrote the Court's judgment in Economic Freedom Fighters v Speaker of the National Assembly, which declared that President Zuma had violated the South African Constitution by failing to act on the Public Protector's Nkandla report. Mogoeng's "powerful" and "profound" judgment was hailed as a "triumph for the rule of law", and a major blow to the widely criticised President, of whose conduct the judgment was "scathing". One commentator said Mogoeng's judgment was "his moment of triumph and redemption", and marked his transformation from a supposed "tool" of the establishment to a "national hero" in a manner reminiscent of Earl Warren. A year later, Mogoeng delivered the unanimous judgment in UDM v Speaker of the National Assembly, in which he granted an application brought by opposition parties to set aside the refusal by Speaker Baleka Mbete, a close Zuma ally, to have a vote of no confidence in the President conducted by secret ballot. The opposition parties had argued that the secret ballot was necessary to ensure that ANC MPs could vote against the President without fear of retribution.

Shortly before this, however, Mogoeng had cautioned, in a contentious judgment that failed to win the support of a majority of his colleagues, that judges must respect the separation of powers and defer appropriately to the executive, and on this basis refused to accede to complaints that the government's controversial policy on new television broadcast technologies was unlawful. Much more high-profile was his dissent in Economic Freedom Fighters v Speaker of the National Assembly (No. 2), in which opposition parties had argued that Parliament had not taken adequate steps to hold Zuma to account in terms of the order issued by the Court in the first EFF judgment. On this occasion Mogoeng was strongly opposed to finding against Parliament; he described the majority judgment, which upheld the opposition parties' complaints, as "a textbook case of judicial overreach" and criticised his colleagues for overstepping the separation of powers. The majority judgment, though authored by Mogoeng's usual ally, Jafta J, describes this "unprecedented" allegation as "misplaced and unfortunate"; and Froneman J was motivated to write a judgment of his own, saying that Mogoeng's characterisation of the majority's position "does nothing to further the debate". The EFF was highly critical of Mogoeng's judgment, as well as his conduct at the court sitting when the judgment was delivered: Mogoeng had interrupted Jafta J, mid-delivery, to insist that he read out his (Mogoeng's) judgment in full. The EFF described this as an "abuse of power" and an "unacceptable" show of disrespect to a fellow judge. It also insinuated that, as a result of being "over-celebrated", Mogoeng had become "a monster". One leading commentator said Mogoeng's "very serious" attack on the majority judgment was "difficult to comprehend"; others, however, defended his right to dissent.

=== Gender violence ===
In F v Minister of Safety and Security, in an apparent riposte to critics of his allegedly patriarchal views, Mogoeng strongly deplored sexual violence and held the state liable to compensate a young girl who had been raped by an off-duty policeman. And in 2013 he was praised for his "unexpected progressiveness" at the hearing of Teddy Bear Clinic v Minister of Justice, where his questions from the bench showed "he was clearly moved by the notion that consensual sexual behaviour between minors should not be criminalised". This judgment (per Khampepe J), together with those Mogoeng himself wrote after becoming Chief Justice, were said to show that his "jurisprudence has not been as conservative as some critics thought" it would be. In DE v RH, in which the Court unanimously abrogated the action for adultery, Mogoeng wrote separately to emphasise that the law cannot be used to enforce marital ethics. A detailed retrospective published in October 2016 concluded that Mogoeng had "begun to craft a new name for himself" as a proponent of gender rights.

=== Religious views ===
Mogoeng is an lay preacher in the Pentecostal Winners Chapel but is now a Pastor in the Redeemed Christian Church of God. He attributed the criticism over his nomination and appointment to his Christian faith. But in Mogoeng's view, stated at his JSC interview, God wanted him to be Chief Justice.

Concern about Mogoeng's religious conservatism did not abate during his tenure. In March 2012 he was publicly criticised for requesting judges to attend a leadership conference hosted by Christian evangelist John C. Maxwell, raising concerns about the separation of church and judiciary. And in May 2014 he gave a speech at Stellenbosch University arguing that religion should infuse the law to a greater extent, "starting with the Constitution". He quoted from the Bible, compared the three branches of government to the Holy Trinity and railed against social evils like "fornication". Mogoeng's speech sparked a media furore, in response to which he sought to offer clarification. The resulting press conference seemed to confirm rather than allay the media's fears. On the other hand, one influential columnist praised Mogoeng for his candour, saying it is better than perpetuating the "myth" that judges are neutral and free of all personal predilections. Mogoeng's religious convictions have also found their way into his judgments: in McBride, for example, he railed against the use of "foul language" and South Africa's "being denuded of moral standards", and cited the Bible.

== Head of the JSC ==
As the then Chief Justice of South Africa, Mogoeng was the head of the Judicial Service Commission (JSC), which was responsible for the appointment of judges. The JSC attracted criticism under Mogoeng's stewardship, in part because of its attitude to the racial "transformation" of the judiciary.

Izak Smuts, one of the JSC's senior members, resigned in protest at the JSC's "disturbing" appointment record, and the Helen Suzman Foundation took the JSC to court over its allegedly "irrational" refusal to appoint certain candidates. Shortly thereafter, Chief Justice Mogoeng gave a speech at an Advocates for Transformation event in which he said a "deliberate attempt is being made to delegitimize the JSC" through "scare tactics" and blamed this on "a well coordinated network of individuals and entities" – possibly apartheid agents, Mogoeng implied – "pretending to be working in isolation from each other". Mogoeng called on his audience to oppose "this illegitimate neo-political campaign to have certain people appointed".

This now "infamous" speech was criticised for departing from the requirements of judicial impartiality and seeming to betray a racial bias. Paul Hoffman SC sought to have Mogoeng impeached on the basis that he had brought the judiciary into disrepute, but this complaint was itself widely criticised as "ill-considered" and "weak on the law" and was dismissed by the Judicial Conduct Committee. A year later, when Hoffman and Smuts appeared in an unrelated case before the Constitutional Court (coincidentally involving the Helen Suzman Foundation), Mogoeng strongly criticised the conduct of their client's case and upheld a rare punitive costs order against him. One commentator described this as a "discredit" to the Court's usual approach.

After the retirement of Justice Thembile Skweyiya in May 2014, Mogoeng stated that he wanted to appoint a female judge in his place. The vacancy was then left open for over a year, as a series of female acting appointments were made instead, apparently to provide a test run. This dilatoriness in making a permanent appointment was criticised by commentators, who said it was corrosive of judicial independence and inconsistent with the South African Constitution. Mogoeng's stated reason for the delay, namely the need to find competent female candidates, was said to be "patronising" and unconvincing. Mogoeng was also criticised for giving the impression that JSC appointments were "preordained" and that male candidates would not be considered. The JSC finally acted to fill the vacancy fourteen months after it arose.

Starting in late 2014, after a change in the JSC's composition, several commentators perceived a marked improvement in the conduct of its interviews, especially on questions about gender transformation in the judiciary. This was ascribed in part to Mogoeng's leadership and to the departure of ANC hardliners like Jeff Radebe, Ngoako Ramatlhodi and Fatima Chohan.

=== Hlophe complaint ===
Mogoeng was the head of the JSC during most of the long-running controversy over misconduct complaints against Western Cape High Court Judge President, John Hlophe. The main complaint against Hlophe was laid in 2008 by the judges of the Constitutional Court, who alleged that he tried to persuade them to decide a case in favour of then-President Jacob Zuma. The processing of this complaint was repeatedly stalled so that, more than ten years after it was first lodged, no action had been taken against Hlophe.

In January 2020, further complaints were lodged against Hlophe by his deputy judge president Patricia Goliath. Mogoeng was the chairperson of the JSC's Judicial Conduct Committee, which is mandated to decide this complaint. Mogoeng initially disclaimed responsibility, however, on the basis that he lacks any legal power to take disciplinary action against a judge. This argument has been rejected by commentators and the JCC's refusal to take action described as "bizarre". Later, however, in July 2020, Mogoeng decided that the complaint against Hlophe should be adjudicated by the JCC, and said that, if true, the complaint would be grounds for a finding of gross misconduct.

== Other positions and awards ==
On 27 March 2018 the University of Johannesburg conferred an honorary doctoral degree on Mogoeng, citing his "notable contributions within the judiciary sphere - which should remind South Africans to take the constitution as a guide which will give us unity to build our country and to reconcile as all South Africans".

In 2013, Mogoeng was awarded an honorary doctorate by North-West University.

== See also ==
- List of Constitutional Court opinions of Mogoeng Mogoeng
