= Leona Theron =

South African judge

The Honourable Leona Theron

Justice of the Constitutional Court
- Incumbent
- Assumed office 1 July 2017
- Appointed by: Jacob Zuma
- Preceded by: Johann van der Westhuizen

Judge of the Supreme Court of Appeal
- In office 1 December 2010 – 30 June 2017
- Appointed by: Jacob Zuma

Judge of the High Court
- In office 15 October 1999 – 30 November 2010
- Appointed by: Thabo Mbeki
- Division: KwaZulu-Natal

Personal details
- Born: Leona Valerie Theron; 7 November 1966 (age 59) Wentworth, Durban; Natal, South Africa
- Spouse: Charles Sarjoo
- Education: University of Natal; Georgetown University

Leona Valerie Theron (born 7 November 1966) is a judge of the Constitutional Court of South Africa. Before her elevation in July 2017, she served in the Supreme Court of Appeal between December 2010 and June 2017. She is the first Coloured judge to serve in the Constitutional Court.

Born in Durban, Theron was admitted as an advocate of the High Court of South Africa in December 1990. When she was appointed to the KwaZulu-Natal High Court in October 1999, she was the youngest judge in the country. She was first interviewed for appointment to the Constitutional Court for in December 2008; President Jacob Zuma appointed her in 2017 after the retirement of Justice Johann van der Westhuizen.

== Early life and education ==
Theron was born on 7 November 1966 in Durban. She grew up in a low-income family in Wentworth, which was designated as a Coloured area under apartheid. Although she was considered Coloured, one of her grandmothers was Zulu from Umlazi.

She matriculated from Sparks Estate Senior Secondary School in Sydenham and went on to the University of Natal, where she completed a BA in 1987 and an LLB in 1989. During her studies, she worked as an articled clerk at Dawson & Partners in Durban and as a part-time cashier at OK Bazaars in Umhlanga Rocks; in 1989, she also spent several months as an adjunct lecturer at Mangosuthu Technikon.

Later in 1989, Theron moved to Washington, D. C. to attend Georgetown University Law Center on a Fulbright Scholarship. She graduated with an LLM in 1990. During that year, she worked for six months as a special assistant to the director of the International Labour Organisation, and she split the summer of 1990 between associateships at the Occupational Safety and Health Law Center and at Reich, Adell & Crost, both in Washington, D. C.

== Legal practice ==
Upon her return to South Africa, Theron was admitted as an advocate of the High Court of South Africa in December 1990. She practised at the KwaZulu-Natal Bar for the next nine years, with stints as a trainer at the Community Law Centre in 1990–1991 and as a part-time lecturer at her alma mater in 1994. In the latter half of 1994, she left her practice for four months to work as a provincial adjudication secretary at the KwaZulu-Natal offices of the Independent Electoral Commission, which had just administered South Africa's first post-apartheid elections.

The following year, newly elected President Nelson Mandela appointed her to the Judge White Commission, which was established to investigate the administration of the former TBVC states in preparation for their incorporation into an integrated South African civil service. Theron worked for the commission between January 1995 and May 1997, and in 1995 she also took up a Commonwealth Foundation Fellowship. After leaving the commission in 1997, Theron returned to her legal practice. In addition, between 1998 and 1999, she served stints as an acting judge of the Eastern Cape High Court and KwaZulu-Natal High Court.

== KwaZulu-Natal High Court: 1999–2010 ==
On 15 October 1999, Theron joined the bench permanently when she was appointed to the KwaZulu-Natal High Court. Then aged 32, she was the youngest judge in South Africa and the first black female judge to be appointed to the KwaZulu-Natal court. For this, the Department of Justice named her Woman Achiever of the Year in 2000.

=== Gumede v President ===
Theron's most notable judgement in the High Court was Gumede v President, which declared certain provisions of the Recognition of Customary Marriages Act to be discriminatory and unconstitutional; Theron ruled that women married under customary law were effectively married in community of property, contrary to the statute, and therefore accrued concomitant rights and benefits. The Constitutional Court upheld Theron's order in 2008.

=== Higher courts ===
During her 11 years in the High Court, Theron served lengthy stints as an acting judge in the Supreme Court of Appeal, first from May 2006 to June 2007 and then from December 2009 to March 2010. During her first acting stint, she wrote a minority judgement in State v Nkomo which dissented from Carole Lewis and Edwin Cameron's decision to reduce the prison sentence of a convicted rapist. She later said of the period that, "Coming as junior judge, my first feeling was one of inadequacy."

On several occasions, the Judicial Service Commission shortlisted and interviewed her for possible elevation to higher offices – once for a permanent place on the Supreme Court of Appeal, once for the position of KwaZulu-Natal Deputy Judge President, and twice for seats on the Constitutional Court. The first Constitutional Court interview took place in December 2008 ahead of the retirement of Justice Tholie Madala; the second took place in September 2009, with a longer shortlist and four seats available on the bench. On the second occasion, Theron was viewed as a frontrunner for appointment, and, following a "friendly" interview, the Judicial Service Commission recommended her to President Jacob Zuma as one of seven candidates suitable for appointment to the four vacancies. However, Zuma elected not to appoint her. The Mail & Guardian suggested that Theron had been earmarked to succeed Vuka Tshabalala as KwaZulu-Natal Judge President, while the opposition Democratic Alliance publicly called on Zuma to replace one of his appointees, Mogoeng Mogoeng, with Theron.

== Supreme Court of Appeal: 2010–2017 ==
In October 2010, the Judicial Service Commission interviewed Theron for a new set of vacancies in the Supreme Court of Appeal. The commission recommended her appointment, which was subsequently confirmed by President Zuma, and she joined the bench on 1 December 2010 alongside Steven Majiedt and Willie Seriti. She was the youngest member of the Supreme Court bench at that time. In 2012, Theron wrote the court's majority judgement in Free State Department of Education v Welkom High School; Free State Department of Education v Harmony High School, a matter concerning the exclusion of pregnant learners from two schools in Welkom, Free State; Theron's finding, that provincial governments could not unilaterally impose policy on school governing bodies, was upheld by the Constitutional Court the following year.

Between February and May 2015, Theron was an acting judge in the Constitutional Court, filling the seat of Justice Johann van der Westhuizen; during that time, she wrote two unanimous leading judgments for the court and a further two dissents. Later the same year, the Judicial Service Commission interviewed her once more for a permanent Constitutional Court vacancy, this time as one of four candidates vying for the seat of retired Justice Thembile Skweyiya. Though several public-interest organisations supported her candidacy, she was not appointed.

== Constitutional Court: 2017–present ==
In March 2017, Theron was shortlisted for a fourth and final time for a vacancy at the Constitutional Court, arising from Justice van der Westhuizen's retirement. She was viewed as a frontrunner because of the need to improve gender representation on the court, because she was the most senior of the five candidates, and because she would be the first Coloured judge on the Constitutional Court. During her interview, she was asked about the Gumede judgement and also reflected on the lack of collegiality at the Supreme Court of Appeal, saying that she felt she had been subject to sexism and racism. The Judicial Service Commission nominated Theron and three others as suitable for the vacancy, and President Zuma elected to appointed Theron. She joined the Constitutional Court on 1 July 2017.

Controversially, in 2021, Theron dissented from the court's majority decision to sentence former President Zuma to imprisonment for contempt of court.

== Personal life ==
Theron is married to businessman Charles Sarjoo, with whom she has four children. They are avid hikers, and she climbed Mount Kilimanjaro to celebrate her 50th birthday.

She formerly had various business interests of her own. She was a founding member of the South African chapter of the International Association of Women Judges, and she was its vice-president of programs between 2003 and 2007.
