= Nonkosi Mhlantla =

South African judge (born 1964)

The Honourable Nonkosi Mhlantla

Justice of the Constitutional Court
- Incumbent
- Assumed office 1 December 2015 (Acting: January 2013 – December 2013)
- Appointed by: Jacob Zuma
- Preceded by: Thembile Skweyiya

Judge of the Supreme Court of Appeal
- In office 1 December 2008 – 30 November 2015
- Appointed by: Kgalema Motlanthe

Judge of the High Court
- In office 1 June 2002 – 30 November 2008
- Appointed by: Thabo Mbeki
- Division: Eastern Cape

Personal details
- Born: Nonkosi Zoliswa Mhlantla; 2 May 1964 (age 62) Port Elizabeth, South Africa
- Education: University of the North

Nonkosi Zoliswa Mhlantla (born 2 May 1964) is a South African judge of the Constitutional Court. Elevated to that court in December 2015, she was formerly a judge of the Supreme Court of Appeal between December 2008 and November 2015. She entered legal practice as an attorney in her hometown, Port Elizabeth, and joined the bench in June 2002, becoming the first woman ever to be appointed to the Eastern Cape Division of the High Court of South Africa.

== Early life and career ==
Mhlantla was born on 2 May 1964 in Port Elizabeth in the Eastern Cape. She grew up in the Port Elizabeth townships of KwaZakhele and New Brighton. In 1982, she matriculated at Kenneth Masekela High School in KwaThema, a township outside Springs in the former Transvaal, and she went on to the University of the North, where she completed a BProc in 1987.

Between 1990 and 2002, she practised as an attorney in Port Elizabeth, running her own firm named N. Mhlantla & Associates. As a junior attorney, she handled some criminal matters, including Apartheid-era political trials, but she focused primarily on civil, labour, and arbitration matters. During this period, she served briefly as an acting judge in the High Court of South Africa, filling a vacancy in the Eastern Cape Division between April and September 2000; she also served as a commissioner in Small Claims Court.

== Eastern Cape High Court: 2002–2008 ==
Mhlantla was appointed permanently to the Eastern Cape High Court on 1 June 2002. She was the first woman to be appointed to that bench in its 138-year history. Towards the end of her six-year tenure in the High Court, from June 2007 to November 2008, she was seconded as an acting judge to the Supreme Court of Appeal.

== Supreme Court of Appeal: 2008–2015 ==
In August 2008, Mhlantla was shortlisted as one of several candidates to fill one of two permanent vacancies in the Supreme Court of Appeal. She was appointed by President Kgalema Motlanthe later that year. Throughout 2013, she served as an acting judge in the Constitutional Court of South Africa, during absences by Justice Edwin Cameron, Justice Johann van der Westhuizen, and Chief Justice Mogoeng Mogoeng. During that period, she wrote several majority judgements for the Constitutional Court.

== Constitutional Court: 2015–present ==
In June 2015, the Judicial Service Commission announced that Mhlantla was one of four candidates who had been shortlisted for possible appointment to fill a permanent vacancy on the Constitutional Court. The seat had formerly belonged to retired Justice Thembile Skweyiya, and commentators had criticised the delay in appointing Skweyiya's replacement. The other candidates were also women – Dhaya Pillay, Leona Theron, and Zukisa Tshiqi – but Mhantla was the most experienced among them. She was nominated to the position by the National Association for Democratic Lawyers, of which was a founding member, and she was viewed as "a safe choice on the constitutional interpretation front", given her record of moderate judgements. Her interview took place in July in Johannesburg.

On 9 November 2015, President Jacob Zuma announced that he would appoint Mhlantla to the Constitutional Court bench, with effect from 1 December. When Justice Sisi Khampepe retired in 2021, she became the longest-serving woman in the Constitutional Court.

== Personal life ==
Mhlantla is a single mother to an adult daughter.
