= Bess Nkabinde =

South African judge (born 1959)

The Honourable Bess Nkabinde

Justice of the Constitutional Court
- In office January 2006 – December 2017
- Appointed by: Thabo Mbeki
- Preceded by: Arthur Chaskalson

Judge of the High Court
- In office November 1999 – January 2006
- Appointed by: Thabo Mbeki
- Division: Bophuthatswana

Personal details
- Born: Baaitse Elizabeth Motsatsi; 15 May 1959 (age 67) Silwerkrans, Transvaal; Union of South Africa
- Spouse: Bailey Mmono
- Education: University of Zululand; North-West University

Baaitse Elizabeth "Bess" Nkabinde-Mmono (née Motsatsi; born 15 May 1959) is a South African retired judge who served in the Constitutional Court of South Africa from January 2006 to December 2017. During that time, she was acting Deputy Chief Justice of South Africa from 23 May 2016 to 7 June 2017. She joined the bench in November 1999 as a judge of the Bophuthatswana Provincial Division.

Born in present-day North West Province, Nkabinde entered legal practice as a state law adviser in the homeland government of Bophuthatswana before she was admitted as an advocate in 1988. President Thabo Mbeki appointed her as a judge of the Bophuthatswana Division of the High Court in November 1999 and elevated her to the Constitutional Court in January 2006. She retired in December 2017 at the end of her 12-year term.

== Early life ==
Nkabinde was born on 15 May 1959 in Silwerkrans in what was then the Western Transvaal (now part of the North West Province). Her family is BaTlôkwa. She matriculated at Mariasdal High School in Tweespruit in 1979. Thereafter she obtained a BProc degree at the University of Zululand in 1983, an LLB at North-West University in 1986, and a diploma in industrial relations at Damelin College in 1987.

== Legal practice ==
In 1984, while still a law student, Nkabinde joined the government of the homeland of Bophuthatswana as a state law adviser, working in legislative drafting. After her graduation, she was admitted as an advocate in Bophuthatswana in 1988, and she subsequently served her pupillage in Johannesburg before gaining admission as an advocate of the Supreme Court of South Africa the following year. According to Nkabinde, she left the Bophuthatswana government because of the discriminatory treatment she and her colleagues received.

Between 1990 and 1999, she was a practising advocate in the North West, with a broad, generalist practice. During that period, she was also a member of the Black Lawyers' Association, a member of the North West Parks Board from 1995 to 1999, secretary of the North West Bar Association from 1998 to 1999, and a member of the Small Claims Court in Mafikeng from 1998 to 1999. She was appointed as an acting judge for the first time in February 1999.

== Bophuthatswana High Court: 1999–2006 ==
In November 1999, President Thabo Mbeki appointed Nkabinde permanently as a judge of the Bophuthatswana Provincial Division (later the North West Division) of the High Court of South Africa. During her six years in the High Court, she was an acting judge in the Labour Court for two terms, in 2000 and 2003 respectively; an acting judge in the Labour Appeal Court from October 2004 to May 2005; and an acting judge in the Supreme Court of Appeal from June to November 2005. She was appointed as chairperson of the judiciary's Rules Board in 2004, a position she held until 2013.

== Constitutional Court: 2006–2017 ==
On 17 October 2005 in Cape Town, Nkabinde was one of five candidates whom the Judicial Service Commission interviewed for possible appointment to Arthur Chaskalson's vacant seat in the Constitutional Court of South Africa. The other candidates were academics Cathi Albertyn, Glenda Fick, Cora Hoexter, and Penelope Andrews; the only male candidate, High Court judge Essop Patel, withdrew before the interviews took place. The General Council of the Bar supported Nkabinde's nomination on the basis of her "wide judicial experience" and demographic profile. However, the opposition Democratic Alliance preferred Hoexter for the position, with party leader Tony Leon describing Nkabinde as "a relatively obscure judge from the remote reaches of North-West Province" with "no significant background in constitutional law".

President Mbeki appointed Nkabinde to the position and she took office in January 2006. She was the first woman to gain appointment to the Constitutional Court since Justices Kate O'Regan and Yvonne Mokgoro, who had served in the court since its inception in 1995.

=== Jurisprudence ===
Nkabinde's notable majority judgments include two related to gender equality: Hassam v Jacobs, on the right of intestate succession in polygynous Muslim marriages, and S v Masiya, a highly controversial criminal law judgment which expanded the definition of rape. Two other controversial judgments, Lee v Minister of Correctional Services (in the law of delict) and Botha v Rich (in contract law), also attracted severe criticism from commentators.

=== Hlophe controversy ===
In 2008, Nkabinde was a member of the coram in Thint v NDPP, a politically sensitive case emanating from the ongoing corruption prosecution of presidential candidate Jacob Zuma. According to Nkabinde, while the Constitutional Court's judgment was reserved, she was visited at her chambers by Cape Judge President John Hlophe, who she said tried to lobby her in Zuma's favour. A Zulu himself, he allegedly asked Nkabinde about her own Zulu surname (acquired by marriage) before telling her that "he had a mandate" to meet with her and also had connections with "national intelligence". He allegedly urged her to decide "properly" on the issue of privilege, a key legal issue in the case and one on which Nkabinde had been assigned the task of writing a post-hearing note for the court. Nkabinde later summarised her impression of this encounter as a "sense... that he was attempting to influence me."

Hlophe denied Nkabinde's account, saying that Nkabinde had agreed to meet with him and had welcomed him into her chambers. He denied having discussed the merits of the privilege issue with her, denied claiming links to the intelligence community, and said that Nkabinde had misunderstood his reference to his "mandate": he had apparently meant that Chief Justice Pius Langa had mandated him to chair the local organising committee of the Commonwealth Conference on Judges and Magistrates. However, an acting justice in the Constitutional Court, Chris Jafta, made similar allegations against Hlophe, and the full bench of the Constitutional Court laid a formal complaint with the Judicial Service Commission in June 2008.

Although Nkabinde and Jafta had supported the Constitutional Court's initial complaint against Hlophe, they appeared to reverse themselves in 2013, when their lawyers, Bantubonke Tokota and Selby Mbenenge, abruptly launched a challenge against the jurisdiction of the tribunal that the Judicial Service Commission had established to investigate their own complaint. Although the judges claimed that they were simply seeking to uphold the Constitution, Eusebius McKaiser slammed their "cowardice". Their challenge to the tribunal's legitimacy failed in the South Gauteng High Court, and in 2016, on appeal, in the Supreme Court of Appeal; they attempted to appeal to their own court, the Constitutional Court, but were denied leave to do so. Nkabinde ultimately testified against Hlophe at a Judicial Conduct Tribunal in 2020, and Hlophe was impeached in 2024.

=== Deputy Chief Justice ===
On 23 May 2016, President Jacob Zuma announced that Nkabinde would act as Deputy Chief Justice of South Africa following Justice Dikgang Moseneke's retirement from that position. She filled the position for over a year until Justice Raymond Zondo was appointed to replace Moseneke in June 2017; during that period, she also filled in for Mogoeng Mogoeng as acting Chief Justice in November 2016. When Zondo's appointment was announced, opposition politician Julius Malema wrote an open letter to Zuma, complaining that he had unfairly overlooked Nkabinde, a qualified black woman candidate; in response, Zuma pointed out that Nkabinde's non-renewable term in the court would end only six months later.

Nkabinde retired from the judiciary in December 2017 after a special ceremonial session on 7 December, at which she delivered her last judgment in the labour law case Public Servants Association obo Ubogu v Head of the Department of Health, Gauteng and Others, Head of the Department of Health, Gauteng and Another v Public Servants Association obo Ubogu. During her farewell address, Nkabinde reflected on the notion of the separation of powers, pointing out that the separation was supposed to serve the pursuit of constitutional values shared by all three branches of government; she speculated that if the legislative and executive branches did more to promote the Constitution, the judiciary would "play a far significantly less central role than it is present required to do".

Her seat on the Constitutional Court remained vacant for almost two years until, in 2019, President Cyril Ramaphosa appointed Zukisa Tshiqi and Steven Majiedt to fill the dual vacancies left by Nkabinde and Moseneke's retirement.

== Retirement ==
Since her retirement from the judiciary, Nkabinde has served, inter alia, as the judge designated under the Regulation of Interception of Communications Act, 2002 to authorise the interception of private communications, as well as an acting judge of appeal in the Supreme Court of Namibia.

In November 2020, the Speaker of the National Assembly, Thandi Modise, appointed her to chair an independent panel tasked with evaluating whether there was prima facie evidence of incompetence or misconduct by Busisiwe Mkhwebane, the Public Protector of South Africa. The panel reported to Parliament in March 2021 that there was such evidence and that impeachment would be an appropriate remedy.

== Honours ==
On 21 October 2021, North-West University awarded Nkabinde an honorary doctorate "for her exceptional contribution to the legal profession and to social justice in South Africa".

== Personal life ==
Nkabinde has two children.
