= Thembile Skweyiya =

South African judge (1939 - 2015)

The Honourable Thembile Skweyiya

Justice of the Constitutional Court
- In office 1 February 2004 – 6 May 2014
- Appointed by: Thabo Mbeki
- Succeeded by: Nonkosi Mhlantla

Judge of the High Court
- In office 1 February 2001 – 31 January 2004
- Appointed by: Thabo Mbeki
- Division: Natal

Chancellor of the University of Fort Hare
- In office 2008 – 1 September 2015
- Succeeded by: Makhenkesi Stofile

Personal details
- Born: Thembile Lewis Skweyiya; 17 June 1939 Worcester, Cape Province; Union of South Africa
- Died: 1 September 2015 (aged 76)
- Spouse: Sayo Skweyiya
- Relations: Zola Skweyiya (brother)
- Education: Healdtown Institute
- Alma mater: University of Natal

Thembile Lewis Skweyiya (17 June 1939 – 1 September 2015) was a South African lawyer and judge who served on the Constitutional Court of South Africa between February 2004 and May 2014. He rose to prominence as a civil rights lawyer during apartheid and he served three years in the KwaZulu-Natal High Court before his elevation to the Constitutional Court.

Born in the Western Cape, Skweyiya was educated at the University of Natal, where he became involved in anti-apartheid politics. He was admitted as an advocate of the Supreme Court of South Africa in 1970, and in 1989 he became the first black African lawyer to take silk in South Africa. Practising law in Durban, Skweyiya specialised in commercial law and civil law, but became best known in the 1980s as counsel to several anti-apartheid activists and organisations.

President Thabo Mbeki appointed Skweyiya to the KwaZulu-Natal High Court in February 2001, and he immediately began a lengthy acting stint in the Constitutional Court. After he joined the bench of the higher court permanently in February 2004, Skweyiya developed a reputation as a progressive justice with a particular interest in children's rights. He retired from the bench in May 2014 and thereafter served as Inspecting Judge of Correctional Services from May 2015 until his death in September 2015.

== Early life and education ==
Skweyiya was born on 17 June 1939 in Worcester in the former Cape Province. He attended primary school in Cape Town but matriculated at Healdtown in the Eastern Cape in 1959. His family, originally from the Cradock region of the Eastern Cape, was politically active during apartheid; his younger brother, Zola Skweyiya, was a prominent activist and later became a member of cabinet.

He attended the University of Natal, where he completed a Bachelor of Social Science in 1963 and an LLB in 1967. He had initially intended to qualify as a paediatrician but became interested in the law through his involvement in the university's anti-apartheid student movement; he served on the student representative council between 1963 and 1964. He was also influenced by Duma Nokwe, who persuaded him to burn his dompas while he was an undergraduate student. He later recounted that it was Griffiths Mxenge, his friend and a prominent human rights lawyer, who told him to "do your LLB and then you can be a learned doctor." In 2014, he said, "I like to say that I became a lawyer and consequently a judge by default... For many years I was convinced that I would eventually return to medicine".

== Legal practice ==
Skweyiya served his articles of clerkship between 1968 and 1970, and in 1970 he was admitted as an advocate of the Supreme Court of South Africa. He joined the bar in Durban, where he practised as an advocate continuously until 1996. His early practice dealt almost exclusively in commercial and civil matters heard in the Supreme Court's Natal Provincial Division, but in the 1980s he became nationally renowned primarily as a human rights and civil rights lawyer. Representing various anti-apartheid organisations and trade unions, he served as counsel in a range of political trials, cases concerning political detentions, and inquests into deaths in detention, among other matters. His activist clients included Griffiths Mxenge, Oscar Mpetha, Jeff Radebe, Sibusiso Zondo (the perpetrator of the 1985 Amanzimtoti bombing), and Zeph Mothopeng and the other defendants of the 1979 Bethal terrorism trial. Pius Langa was among those who served their pupillage in Skweyiya's chambers.

In 1989, Skweyiya took silk status, becoming the first black African senior counsel in South African history. He later said that his being regarded as the first "is not something which makes me happy", given what it reflected about South Africa. After he took silk, and with negotiations to end apartheid underway, the focus of his practice returned to commercial and civil matters.

In addition to his membership of the Durban Bar, Skweyiya was admitted as an advocate of the High Court of Lesotho and High Court of Namibia in 1974; he received silk status in the latter in 1992. He was also active in a number of progressive political and community organisations, including as an adviser to the South African Students' Organisation, the chairperson of the Institute of Black Research, a member of the Mandela Committee, and a member of the advisory committee of the Methodist Church of Southern Africa. In 1992, the African National Congress appointed him to head an internal commission of inquiry, informally called the Skweyiya Commission, into human rights abuses at Umkhonto we Sizwe camps.

== Hiatus from legal practice ==
Skweyiya was among the lawyers who helped draft the post-apartheid Constitution, and in 1994, he was one of the ten candidates whom the Judicial Service Commission shortlisted for possible appointment to the first bench of the post-apartheid Constitutional Court of South Africa. Although he was not appointed to the court, he left the Bar shortly afterwards, when, in mid-1996, President Nelson Mandela appointed him as the inaugural Inspector-General of Intelligence. However, he resigned in October 1996, before even taking office; his resignation followed a series of media reports about his apparent unhappiness with the progress of salary negotiations.

Instead of taking up the post of Inspector-General, Skweyiya pursued a hiatus in the corporate sector, becoming a director of several different South African companies. He also served as an independent assessor for the University of Transkei, among other clients. He also occasionally acted as a judge in the High Court of South Africa, both in the Kwa-Zulu Natal Division and in the Eastern Cape Division; cumulatively, between October 1995 and January 2001, he served two years as an acting judge.

== KwaZulu-Natal High Court: 2001–2004 ==
Skweyiya was viewed as reluctant to join the bench permanently, until he did so on 1 February 2001, taking up a seat in the KwaZulu-Natal High Court. Soon after his appointment, he began a lengthy stint as an acting judge in the Constitutional Court, where he sat between August 2001 and May 2002. While an acting justice, he wrote the Constitutional Court's landmark judgement in Du Toit v Minister for Welfare and Population Development, which granted same-sex couples the right jointly to adopt children.

Later in 2002, the National Association of Democratic Lawyers nominated Skweyiya for permanent appointment to a vacancy on the Constitutional Court, but, though he was shortlisted by the Judicial Service Commission, President Thabo Mbeki opted to appoint Dikgang Moseneke instead.

== Constitutional Court: 2004–2014 ==
Following another set of Judicial Service Commission interviews in October 2003, Mbeki announced on 7 January 2004 that he would appoint Skweyiya permanently to the Constitutional Court. He joined the bench on 1 February 2004; he and Johann van der Westhuizen filled the vacancies created by the retirement of Justices Laurie Ackermann and Richard Goldstone. He spent over a decade in the Constitutional Court. During that time, he served as acting Deputy Chief Justice for two terms, between November 2013 and March 2014, while Dikgang Moseneke in turn acted as Chief Justice.

Skweyiya was widely viewed as a progressive justice. Commentators noted his focus on social justice and his special interest in children's rights, including his contribution to the interpretation of the concept of the best interests of the child, which Section 28 of the Bill of Rights declares to be "paramount". He also wrote the majority judgement in Joseph v City of Johannesburg, which expanded the duty of the state to satisfy residents' socioeconomic rights. Other notable majority judgements penned by Skweyiya include Kruger v President and Volks v Robinson.

He retired from the bench in May 2014. At a ceremonial session on 6 May, he delivered his final judgement, a unanimous judgement in J v National Director of Public Prosecutions which declared a provision of the Sexual Offences Act to be unconstitutional insofar as it violated the anonymity of child offenders convicted of sexual offences against other children, regardless of the best interests of the child. His seat on the Constitutional Court remained vacant for over a year amid a scramble for women candidates; Nonkosi Mhlantla was finally appointed in December 2015.

== Retirement ==
A year after his retirement, on 1 May 2015, Skweyiya took office as Inspecting Judge of Correctional Services, a position at the head of the Judicial Inspectorate for Correctional Services. President Jacob Zuma appointed him to a three-year term in the office. Until his death, Skweyiya was also the Chancellor of the University of Fort Hare, a position which he had assumed in 2008.

He died on 1 September 2015 after a short illness. He received a special official funeral, at which Deputy President Cyril Ramaphosa delivered the eulogy.

== Personal life ==
He was married to Sayo Nomakhosi Skweyiya, with whom he had four children.
