= Chris Jafta =

South African judge

Justice of the Constitutional Court
- In office 12 October 2009 – 11 October 2021
- Appointed by: Jacob Zuma

Judge of the Supreme Court of Appeal
- In office November 2004 – 11 October 2009
- Appointed by: Thabo Mbeki

Judge of the High Court
- In office November 1999 – November 2004
- Appointed by: Thabo Mbeki
- Division: Transkei

Personal details
- Born: Christopher Nyaole Jafta; 1959 (age 66–67) Matatiele, Cape Province
- Education: University of Transkei

Christopher Nyaole Jafta (born 1959) is a retired South African judge who served in the Constitutional Court of South Africa from October 2009 to October 2021. Formerly an academic and practising advocate in the Transkei, he joined the bench in November 1999 as a judge of the Transkei Division. Thereafter he served in the Supreme Court of Appeal from November 2004 to October 2009.

Jafta was born in the present-day Matatiele, Eastern Cape, and began his legal career as a civil servant in the Transkei bantustan from 1983 to 1988, including as a magistrate from 1986 to 1988. Between 1988 and 1992, he taught commercial law and constitutional law at the University of Transkei, his alma mater, and thereafter he practised as an advocate in Mthatha until he joined the High Court bench in 1999. He rose rapidly through the judicial ranks and was elevated to the Constitutional Court in 2009 on the appointment of President Jacob Zuma. During his 12-year term in the apex court, he was regarded as a member of the court's politically conservative minority.

== Early life and education ==
Jafta was born in 1959 in Matatiele in the former Cape Province, now on the border between the Eastern Cape and KwaZulu-Natal. His father was a builder and his mother a housewife. He attended school in Matatiele and went on to the University of Transkei, where he completed an BJuris in 1983 and an LLB in 1987.

== Legal career ==
In 1983, while studying part-time for his LLB, he began his legal career as a court interpreter in the former bantustan of the Transkei. He was promoted to District Court prosecutor in Cala in early 1984, but he was demoted in December 1985 for failing to cooperate with the security police and served briefly as an administrative clerk. However, in July 1986, he was appointed as a magistrate.

In February 1988, he resigned from the civil service to serve his articles of clerkship at Mbuqe and Mbuqe, a firm of attorneys. Less than six months later, in July 1988, he accepted appointment as a lecturer at his alma mater, the University of Transkei, where he taught commercial law and constitutional law. His colleagues at the university included Mbuyiseli Madlanga, who had also been his classmate as an undergraduate, and John Hlophe.

In 1992, he moved briefly to Johannesburg, where he completed his pupillage at the Johannesburg Bar. He returned to the Cape to enter legal practice as an advocate in Mthatha in January 1993, focusing primarily on labour law and constitutional law matters. He served as an acting judge in the High Court of South Africa for four months in 1997 and for ten months in 1999.

== Transkei High Court: 1999–2004 ==
In November 1999, Jafta was appointed to the bench permanently as a judge of the High Court's Transkei Division at Mthatha (now part of the Eastern Cape Division). Among his notable judgments in the High Court was Mjeni v Minister of Health and Welfare, Eastern Cape, a constitutional law matter; it was quoted with approval by the Constitutional Court of South Africa on more than one occasion.

During his brief tenure in the High Court, he was acting Judge President of the Transkei Division from June 2001 to June 2003, an acting judge of appeal in the Labour Appeal Court between 2003 and 2004, and an acting judge of appeal in the Supreme Court of Appeal from June to October 2004.

== Supreme Court of Appeal: 2004–2009 ==
On 3 November 2004, President Thabo Mbeki announced that he would elevate Jafta to the Supreme Court of Appeal permanently. He took office the same month, alongside Dunstan Mlambo and Nathan Ponnan. In 2007, he was the lone dissenting judge in HTF Developers v Minister of Environmental Affairs and Tourism, and, on appeal, his dissent was upheld unanimously by the Constitutional Court in MEC for Agriculture, Conservation and Environment v HTF Developers. Jafta himself served a stint as an acting justice of the Constitutional Court between December 2007 and May 2008, and by that time he was regarded as a "rising star" in the judiciary.

== Constitutional Court: 2009–2021 ==
In October 2008, Jafta was one of seven judges whom the Judicial Service Commission was scheduled to interview for possible appointment to the seat of retired Justice Tholie Madala, but he withdrew from contention shortly before the interviews, reportedly because of the ongoing Hlophe controversy. By September 2009, there were four vacancies on the court – arising from the retirement of Chief Justice Pius Langa and Justices Yvonne Mokgoro, Kate O'Regan, and Albie Sachs – and Jafta was shortlisted for one of them, nominated by the Legal Resources Centre, the Aids Law Project, and fellow Judge of Appeal Kenneth Mthiyane. He was interviewed in Kliptown, and after the interviews, he was one of the seven candidates whom the Judicial Service Commission recommended as suitable for appointment.

On 11 October 2009, President Jacob Zuma confirmed Jafta's elevation to the Constitutional Court. He took office the following day alongside Sisi Khampepe, Johan Froneman, and Mogoeng Mogoeng.

=== Jurisprudence ===
Jafta was one of the most prolific judges on the court and was particularly well known for writing dissenting opinions. By 2013, the Mail & Guardian observed that he was "emerging as one of the main brains on the politically conservative side" of the Constitutional Court bench, which also included Justices Mogoeng and Raymond Zondo. He was described as a legal formalist, as well as prone to defer to the executive branch. However, he also wrote for the court's majority in EFF v Speaker II, a politically sensitive case in which the court arguably threatened to encroach on the independence of the legislature.

Perhaps his most celebrated judgment was Bakgatla-ba-Kgafela, concerning the application of the Communal Property Association Act, 1996 to a dispute between residents of Bakgatla-Ba-Kgafela community of the rural North West and their traditional leader. Jafta's unanimous judgment, which upheld an appeal in favour of the community members, was described as a "crucial" judgment on land rights and land reform. Commentators welcomed it, describing it as a victory for democratic land rights. More generally, Jafta's colleague, Justice Mbuyiseli Madlanga, admired his talent for statutory interpretation.

=== Retirement ===
Jafta retired from the judiciary on 11 October 2021 at the end of his non-renewable 12-year term in the Constitutional Court. His retirement coincided with that of Justice Sisi Khampepe and Chief Justice Mogoeng Mogoeng.

== Hlophe controversy ==
In 2008, while Jafta was acting in the Constitutional Court, Cape Judge President John Hlophe allegedly approached Jafta and Justice Bess Nkabinde with an attempt to persuade them to find in Jacob Zuma's favour in Thint v NDPP, a case that was pending before the court. The Constitutional Court laid a public complaint against Hlophe which Jafta and Nkabinde supported. Six years later, however, when the misconduct enquiry against Hlophe was pending, Jafta and Nkabinde brought a court challenge to the tribunal's jurisdiction, saying their own complaint was not legally valid. Eusebius McKaiser slammed Jafta and Nkabinde's "cowardice", which he said had brought the Constitutional Court into disrepute. Others said Jafta and Nkabinde's conduct left them "baffled" and confounded expectations about how judges should behave. The two judges claimed, in response, that they were simply upholding the Constitution.

The High Court dismissed the judges' application on 26 September 2014, and an appeal to the Supreme Court of Appeal failed in March 2016. Jafta and Nkabinde subsequently filed for leave to appeal to their own court, the Constitutional Court, a move which the Daily Maverick said created the impression that they were "obstructing and delaying the process" of holding Hlophe to account. On 16 May 2016, the Constitutional Court dismissed the two judges' application for leave to appeal. However, on 7 June 2016, in a move that "baffled" observers, Jafta and Nkabinde applied to the court for a second time, now asking it to rescind its earlier dismissal order on the grounds that it had been granted erroneously. Hlophe was ultimately impeached as a result of Jafta and Nkabinde's revelations.

== Personal life ==
Jafta is married to Nomviwo Jafta, with whom he has two children.
