= Johan Froneman =

South African judge

The Honourable Johan Froneman

Justice of the Constitutional Court
- In office 11 October 2009 – 31 May 2020
- Appointed by: Jacob Zuma

Deputy Judge President of the Labour Court
- In office 1996–1999
- Appointed by: Nelson Mandela

Judge of the High Court
- In office 1994 – 10 October 2009
- Appointed by: F.W. de Klerk
- Division: Eastern Cape

Personal details
- Born: Johan Coenraad Froneman; 10 February 1953 (age 73) East London, Cape Province; Union of South Africa
- Spouse: Sonette Froneman
- Education: Grey College, Bloemfontein
- Alma mater: Stellenbosch University; University of South Africa

Johan Coenraad Froneman (born 10 February 1953) is a South African retired judge who was a justice of the Constitutional Court of South Africa from October 2009 to May 2020. He joined the judiciary as a judge of the Eastern Cape Division in 1994 and was elevated to the apex court by President Jacob Zuma. He was also the inaugural Deputy Judge President of the Labour Court of South Africa between 1996 and 1999.

A native Afrikaans speaker, Froneman grew up in Cathcart in rural Eastern Cape. Before his appointment to the bench, he was an advocate in Grahamstown, Eastern Cape, where he entered practice in 1980 and took silk in 1990. He retired from the judiciary in May 2020.

== Early life and education ==
Froneman was born on 10 February 1953 in East London in the former Cape Province. Raised in a Christian, Afrikaans-speaking family, he grew up on his family farm in Cathcart, where he attended primary school, and he matriculated in 1970 at Grey College in Bloemfontein.

After matriculating, he did his mandatory military service with the Cape Field Artillery. Thereafter he attended Stellenbosch University, where he completed a BA in 1974 and where he was influenced by Johan Degenaar, a political philosopher on the faculty. He went on to complete an LLB at the University of South Africa in 1977.

== Legal career ==
Froneman served his pupillage at the bar in Pretoria but, upon his admission as an advocate, he moved to Grahamstown, Eastern Cape to commence legal practice there. He practised in Grahamstown between 1980 and 1994, taking silk in 1990.

== Eastern Cape Division: 1994–2009 ==
In 1994, Froneman was appointed as a judge of the Eastern Cape Provincial Division, then a division of the Supreme Court of South Africa and later a division of the High Court of South Africa. A 1994 judgement by Froneman, Qozeleni v Minister of Law and Order, was one of South Africa's earliest experiments in constitutional interpretation, and it was cited by Sydney Kentridge in S v Zuma, the first judgement handed down by the post-apartheid Constitutional Court of South Africa.

In May 1996, Froneman was appointed as deputy judge president of the newly established Labour Courts, in which capacity he deputised John Myburgh. He held that position until 1999. In addition, he was an acting judge in the Supreme Court of Appeal for two terms in 2002.

== Constitutional Court: 2009–2020 ==
In September 2009, the Judicial Service Commission met in Kliptown to interview Froneman and several other nominees to four vacancies in the Constitutional Court. The interviews proceeded smoothly for Froneman, who was directly complimented on his progressive philosophy by commissioners Jeff Radebe and Dumisa Ntsebeza, and he was among the seven candidates whom the Judicial Service Commission shortlisted for the vacancies. On 11 October 2009, President Jacob Zuma announced that he had appointed Froneman and three others – Sisi Khampepe, Chris Jafta, and Mogoeng Mogoeng – to the Constitutional Court bench, with effect from the following day.

In the Constitutional Court, Froneman became renowned for writing minority judgements; he also occasionally wrote in Afrikaans. His notable majority judgements include Gundwana v Steko Development, a unanimous judgement in property law.

During periods of judicial leave in 1999 and 2008 respectively, Froneman held visiting appointments at Harvard University and Oxford University's Centre for Socio-Legal Studies. Between 2003 and 2008, he was an extraordinary professor in public law at Stellenbosch University, in which capacity he gave an annual graduate seminar in human rights law.

He retired from the judiciary on 31 May 2020.

== Personal life ==
He is married to Sonette, an attorney whom he met at the University of South Africa. They have two daughters and live in Grahamstown.
