= Raymond Zondo =

Former Chief Justice of South Africa

The Honourable Raymond Zondo
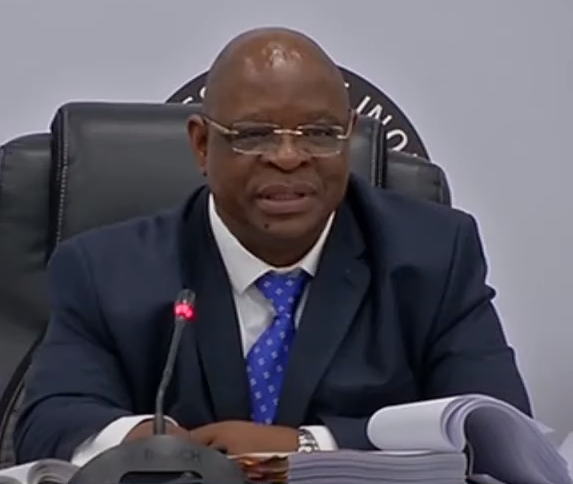

22nd Chief Justice of South Africa
- In office 1 April 2022 – 31 August 2024
- Appointed by: Cyril Ramaphosa
- Deputy: Mandisa Maya
- Preceded by: Mogoeng Mogoeng
- Succeeded by: Mandisa Maya

5th Deputy Chief Justice of South Africa
- In office 7 June 2017 – 31 March 2022
- Chief Justice: Mogoeng Mogoeng
- Preceded by: Dikgang Moseneke
- Succeeded by: Mandisa Maya

Chairperson of the Zondo Commission
- In office 21 August 2018 – 1 January 2022
- Appointed by: President Jacob Zuma
- Preceded by: Commission established
- Succeeded by: Commission abolished
Judicial career (1997-2024)
Judge of the Constitutional Court of South Africa
In office 1 September 2012 – 31 August 2024
Appointed by	Jacob Zuma
Judge President of the Labour Court of South Africa
In office 1 May 2000 – April 2010
Appointed by	Thabo Mbeki
Judge of the North Gauteng High Court
In office April 1999 – August 2012
Appointed by	Nelson Mandela
Judge of the Labour Court of South Africa
In office 1 November 1997 – August 1999
Appointed by	Nelson Mandela

Chancellor of the University of Zululand
- Incumbent
- Assumed office April 2018
- Vice-Chancellor: Xoliswa Mtose
- Preceded by: Jacob Zuma

Personal details
- Born: Raymond Mnyamezeli Mlungisi Zondo; 4 May 1960 (age 66) Ixopo, Natal, Union of South Africa
- Citizenship: South Africa
- Children: 8
- Education: University of Zululand (BJuris); University of Natal (LLB); University of South Africa (LLM)
- Occupation: Judge; attorney; law clerk
- Profession: Lawyer

Raymond Mnyamezeli Mlungisi "Ray" Zondo (born 4 May 1960) is a South African jurist who served as the Chief Justice of South Africa from 1 April 2022 until his retirement on 31 August 2024. President Cyril Ramaphosa appointed Zondo as South Africa's new chief justice with effect from 1 April 2022. He served as acting Chief Justice from 11 October 2021, when Mogoeng Mogoeng retired, until 31 March 2022.

== Early life ==
Zondo was educated at St Mary's Seminary in Ixopo, the University of Zululand and the University of Natal, where he completed his LLB. He was admitted as an attorney in 1989 and practised as a partner in Mathe & Zondo Inc. Judge Zondo received a Master of Laws in commercial law, a Master of Laws in labour law, and a Master of Laws in patent law at the University of South Africa.

== Judicial career ==
In 1997 he was appointed a judge of the Labour Court, and in 1999 he was appointed to the Transvaal Provincial Division of the High Court (later the North Gauteng High Court, now the Gauteng Division). In 2000 he was elevated to Judge President of the Labour Court, a post in which he served for ten years. In 2010 he returned to the Pretoria High Court.

From November 2011 to May 2012, Zondo served as an acting judge of the Constitutional Court. He was permanently appointed with effect from September 2012 and is now considered a key member, with Chris Jafta, of the Court's conservative wing. In June 2017, President Jacob Zuma appointed Zondo to the office of Deputy Chief Justice, succeeding Dikgang Moseneke who retired in 2016. On 10 March 2022, President Cyril Ramaphosa appointed Zondo as the new Chief Justice of the Constitutional Court of South Africa, effective 1 April.

== Commission of Inquiry into State Capture ==
Shortly after taking office in 2018, Ramaphosa approved an inquiry into allegations of corruption during the previous Jacob Zuma government administration, stating that "This is the year in which we will turn the tide of corruption in our public institutions". Zondo was appointed as presiding judge for the Judicial Commission of Inquiry into Allegations of State Capture, Corruption and Fraud in the Public Sector including Organs of State, leading to its popular name, the Zondo Commission. Hearings began on 20 August 2018, it issued its final report in June 2022 and cost close to R1 billion, far more than any prior South African judicial inquiry.
