= Constitutional Court of South Africa =

Supreme court of South Africa

Constitutional Court List: 10 other official names: Konstitusionele Hof (Afrikaans); iKhotho yoMthetho-sisekelo (Southern Ndebele); iNkundla yoMgaqo-siseko (Xhosa); iNkantolo yoMthethosisekelo (Zulu); iNkantolo yeMtsetfosisekelo (Swazi); Kgorotsheko ya Molaotheo (Northern Sotho); Lekgotla la Dinyewe la Molaotheo (Sotho); Kgotlatshekelo ya Molaotheo (Tswana); Khoto ya Vumbiwa (Tsonga); Khothe ya Ndayotewa (Venda)
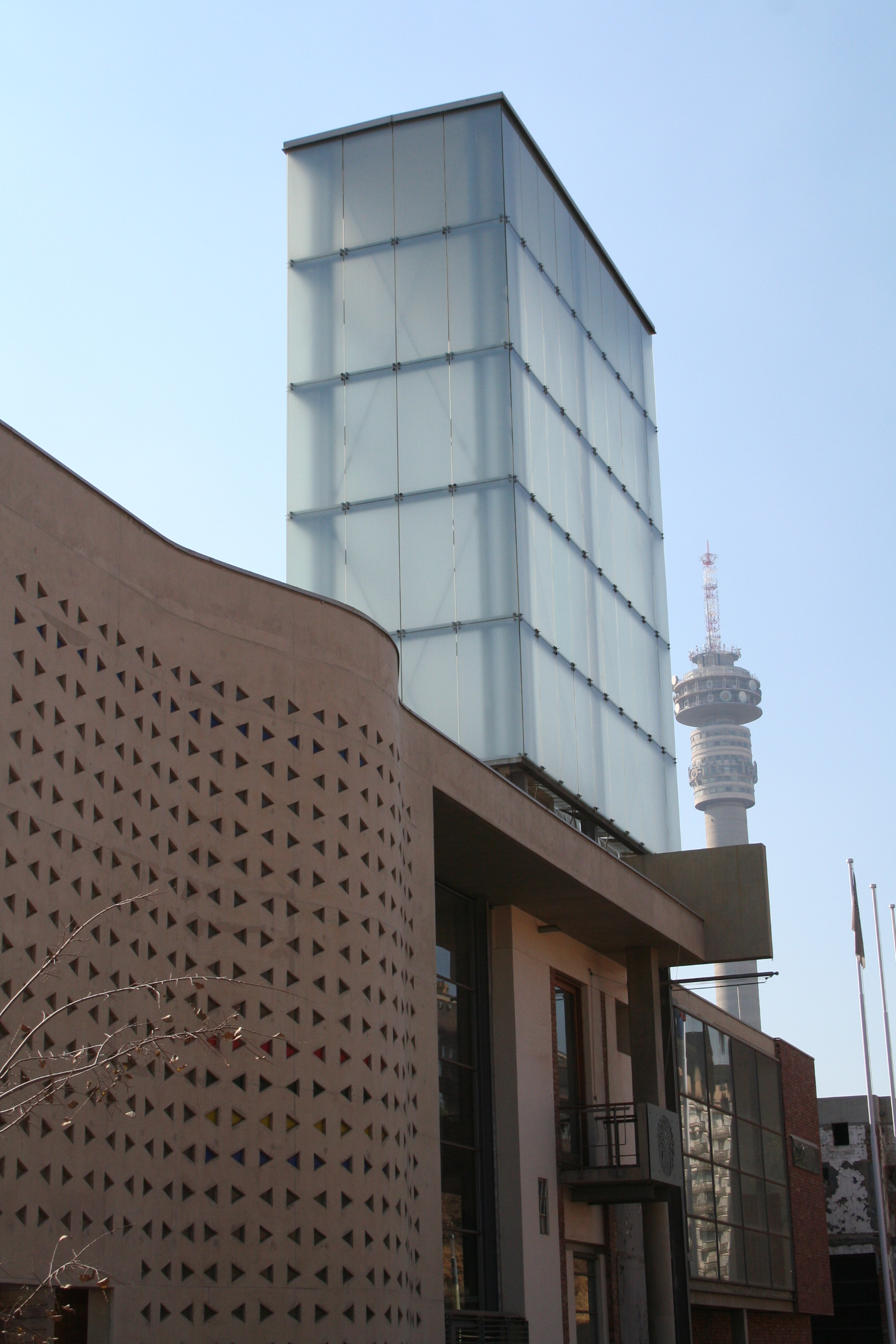
- Constitutional Court building

- Emblem of the Constitutional Court
- Interactive map of Constitutional Court List: 10 other official names: Konstitusionele Hof (Afrikaans); iKhotho yoMthetho-sisekelo (Southern Ndebele); iNkundla yoMgaqo-siseko (Xhosa); iNkantolo yoMthethosisekelo (Zulu); iNkantolo yeMtsetfosisekelo (Swazi); Kgorotsheko ya Molaotheo (Northern Sotho); Lekgotla la Dinyewe la Molaotheo (Sotho); Kgotlatshekelo ya Molaotheo (Tswana); Khoto ya Vumbiwa (Tsonga); Khothe ya Ndayotewa (Venda)
- 26°11′19″S 28°2′36″E
- Established: 1994
- Jurisdiction: South Africa
- Location: Constitution Hill, Johannesburg
- Coordinates: 26°11′19″S 28°2′36″E
- Composition method: Presidential appointment, after consultation
- Authorised by: Constitution of South Africa
- Judge term length: non-renewable 12 years (extendable by Parliament)
- Number of positions: 11
- Website: www.concourt.org.za

Chief Justice of South Africa
- Currently: Mandisa Maya
- Since: 1 September 2024

Deputy Chief Justice of South Africa
- Currently: Dunstan Mlambo
- Since: 1 August 2025

The Constitutional Court of South Africa is the supreme constitutional court established by the Constitution of South Africa, and is the apex court in the South African judicial system, with general jurisdiction.

The Court was first established by the Interim Constitution of 1993, and its first session began in February 1995. It has continued in existence under the Constitution of 1996. The Court sits in the city of Johannesburg. After initially occupying commercial offices in Braamfontein, it now sits in a purpose-built complex on Constitution Hill. The first court session in the new complex was held in February 2004. Originally the final appellate court for constitutional matters, since the enactment of the Seventeenth Amendment of the Constitution in 2013, the Constitutional Court has jurisdiction to hear any matter if it is in the interests of justice for it to do so.

The Constitutional Court consists of eleven judges who are appointed by the President of South Africa from a list drawn up by the Judicial Service Commission. The judges serve for a term of twelve years. The Court is headed by the Chief Justice of South Africa and the Deputy Chief Justice. The Constitution requires that a matter before the Court be heard by at least eight judges. In practice, all eleven judges hear almost every case. Decisions are reached by a majority and written reasons are given.

== History ==
The movement for the establishment of a constitutional court in South Africa was begun in 1920 by the African National Congress (ANC).

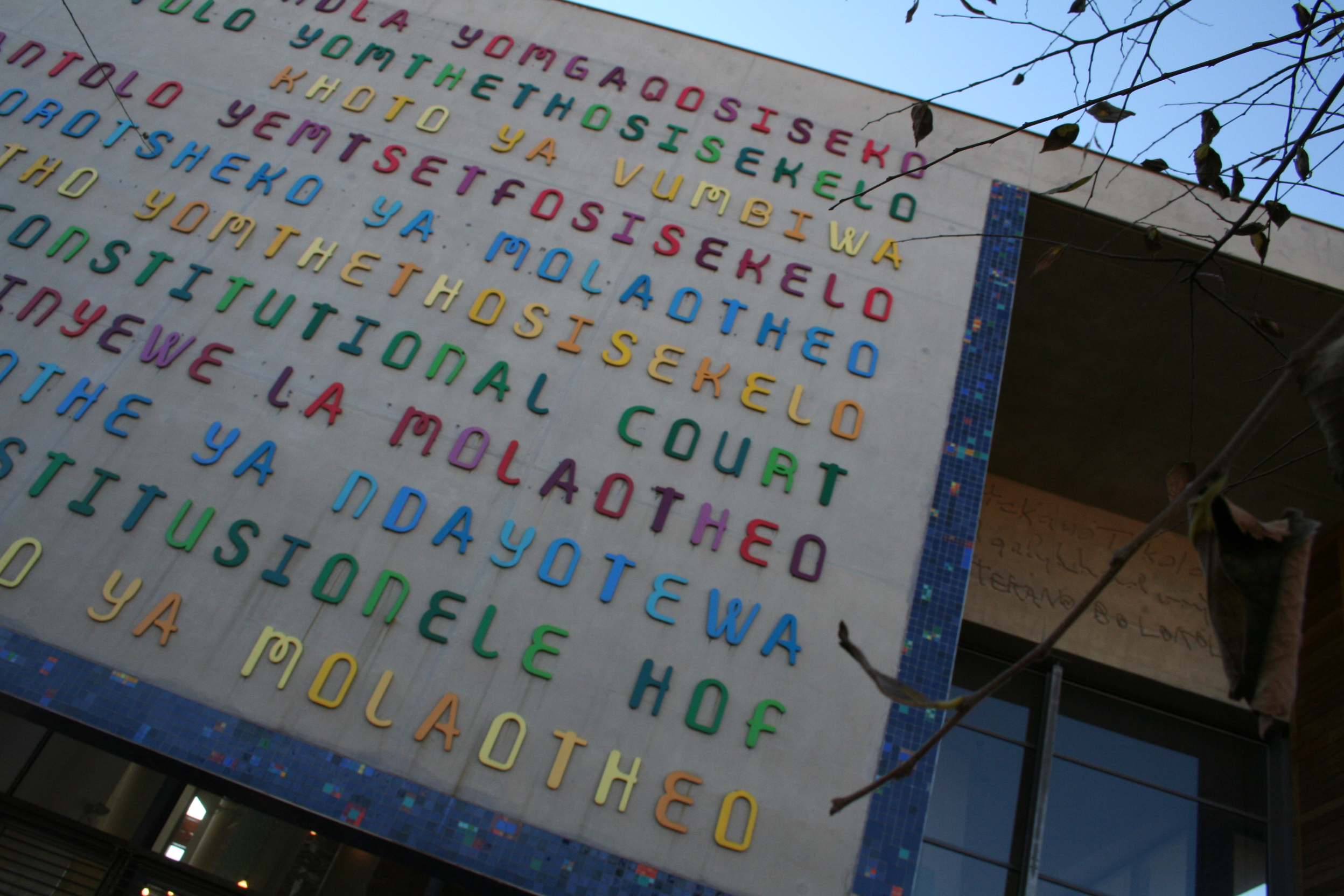
Frontage of the Constitutional Court in South Africa

By 1956, judges and liberals in the country had drawn up a bill of rights in support of the creation of the court. The first meeting of selected members of the court took place in 1994. In 1995, President Nelson Mandela appeared at the court to deliver a speech for its commissioning. According to South African History Online Mandela said, "The last time I appeared in court was to hear whether or not I was going to be sentenced to death. Fortunately for myself and my colleagues we were not. Today I rise not as an accused, but on behalf of the people of South Africa, to inaugurate a court South Africa has never had, a court on which hinges the future of our democracy."

== The Constitutional Court building ==
Constitution Hill is the seat of the Constitutional Court of South Africa. The Constitution Hill precinct is located at 11 Kotze Street in Braamfontein, Johannesburg near the western end of the suburb of Hillbrow. The Hill overlooks downtown Johannesburg to the South and the wealthy northern suburbs of Houghton, Parktown and Sandton to the north.

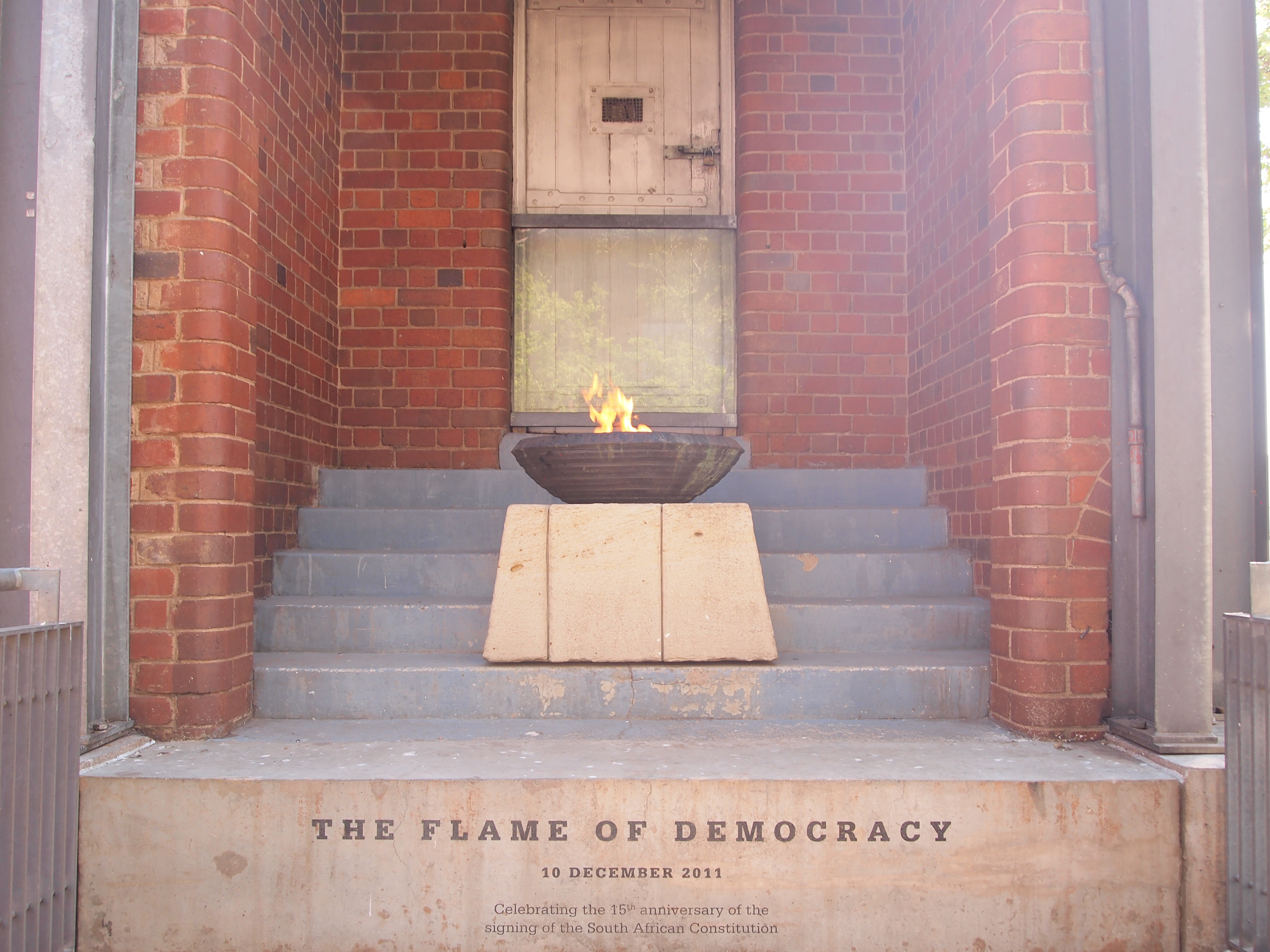
An eternal flame burning on Constitution Hill in Johannesburg, South Africa

The court building was constructed using bricks from the demolished awaiting-trial wing of the former prison. Most of the prison was demolished to make way for the new court, but the stairwells were kept and incorporated into the new building as a reminder of the Constitution's transformative aspirations. Inside the main room, a row of horizontal windows has been set up behind the seats of the judges. While the windows are at head-height on the inside, they are on ground level on the outside. Those sitting in the court consequently have a view of the feet of passersby moving along, above the heads of the judges, to remind them that in a constitutional democracy the role of judges is to act in the interests of the people of the nation, rather than in their own self-interest. The first court session in the new building at this location was held in February 2004. The court building is open to the public who want to attend hearings or view the art gallery in the court atrium. The court houses a collection of more than 200 contemporary artworks chosen by Constitutional Court judge Albie Sachs, including works by Gerard Sekoto, William Kentridge, and Cecil Skotnes.

The doors to the court have the 27 rights of the Bill of Rights carved into them, written in 11 of the 12 official languages of South Africa. The twelfth official language, amended to the constitution in 2023, South African Sign Language, is a manual language and was not included in the original 2004 design, which called for the 11 oral languages codified official by the 1996 constitution.

One of the retained stairwells features a declarative wall sculpture, contributed by the Johannesburg artist Thomas Mulcaire. Mulcaire employed neon lighting tubes to spell-out the Portuguese words A luta continua (the struggle continues); the tubes were then wall-mounted in the 1902 stairwell. A luta continua, in South Africa, dates back to the 1970's, as an anti-Apartheid slogan, inspired by and in solidarity with the anti-colonial war, against Portugal, in South Africa's lusophone neighbour Mozambique. In continuous use, under British-colonial and Apartheid rule, the remnant stairwell now connects floors of the 2004 structure, with Mulcaire's sculpture tying the past of the space to its present and future.

== Justices ==
=== Appointment procedure and tenure ===
Sections 174 to 178 of the Constitution deal with the appointment of judicial officers. Judges may not be members of Parliament, of the government or of political parties. To select judges the Judicial Service Commission first draws up a list of candidates, which must have at least three more names than the number of vacancies. The Commission does this after calling for nominations and holding public interviews. Then the President, after consultation with the Chief Justice and the leaders of political parties represented in the National Assembly, chooses the judges from this list.

In terms of section 176(1) of the Constitution, judges of the Constitutional Court serve for a non-renewable term of 12 years or until they reach the age of 70, whichever is earlier; but these limits may be extended by an Act of Parliament. Section 4 of the Judges' Remuneration and Conditions of Employment Act 47 of 2001 has extended the term limit to an effective term of 15 years including prior service on other courts. The effect is that judges who had served more than 3 years before their appointment to the Constitutional Court retain a 12-year term limit; those who did not, have a longer tenure. The same section delays the retirement age for judges who reach the age of 70 before reaching 15 years of judicial service (including prior service on other courts); their term on the Constitutional Court is extended to age 75 or 15 years of service, whichever is earlier.

=== Current justices ===
| Name | Born | Appt. by | Age at appt. | First day / Length of service | Mand. retirement | Previous positions | Succeeded |
|---|---|---|---|---|---|---|---|
| Mandisa Maya (Chief Justice of South Africa) | 20 March 1964 (age 62) in Tsolo, Eastern Cape | Cyril Ramaphosa | 58 (Deputy Chief Justice) 60 (Chief Justice) | 1 September 2022; 4 years, 1 month | 20 March 2034 | Eastern Cape High Court; Supreme Court of Appeal | Mogoeng Mogoeng Raymond Zondo (as Deputy Chief Justice and Chief Justice) |
| Dunstan Mlambo (Deputy Chief Justice of South Africa) | 18 September 1959 (age 67) in Bushbuckridge, Mpumalanga | Cyril Ramaphosa | 65 | 1 August 2025; 1 year, 2 months | 18 September 2029 | Labour Court of South Africa; Supreme Court of Appeal; Gauteng High Court | Sisi Khampepe Mandisa Maya (as Deputy Chief Justice) |
| Nonkosi Mhlantla | 2 May 1964 (age 62) in Port Elizabeth, Eastern Cape | Jacob Zuma | 51 | 1 December 2015; 10 years, 10 months | 1 December 2027 | Eastern Cape High Court; Supreme Court of Appeal | Thembile Skweyiya |
| Leona Theron | 7 November 1966 (age 59) in Durban, KwaZulu-Natal | Jacob Zuma | 51 | 1 July 2017; 9 years, 3 months | 1 July 2029 | KwaZulu-Natal High Court; Supreme Court of Appeal | Johann van der Westhuizen |
| Steven Majiedt | 18 December 1960 (age 65) in Kenhardt, Northern Cape | Cyril Ramaphosa | 58 | 1 October 2019; 7 years | 18 December 2030 | Northern Cape High Court; Supreme Court of Appeal | Dikgang Moseneke |
| Jody Kollapen | 19 May 1957 (age 69) in Lady Selbourne, Pretoria, Gauteng | Cyril Ramaphosa | 64 | 1 January 2022; 4 years, 9 months | 19 May 2027 | North Gauteng High Court | Edwin Cameron |
| Rammaka Mathopo | 28 January 1963 (age 63) in Gauteng | Cyril Ramaphosa | 58 | 1 January 2022; 4 years, 9 months | 28 January 2033 | South Gauteng High Court; Supreme Court of Appeal | Johan Froneman |
| Owen Rogers | 22 October 1958 (age 67) in Cape Town, Western Cape | Cyril Ramaphosa | 63 | 1 August 2022; 4 years, 2 months | 22 October 2028 | Western Cape High Court; Competition Appeal Court | Chris Jafta |
| Nambitha Dambuza | 31 October 1964 (age 61) in Qonce, Eastern Cape | Cyril Ramaphosa | 61 | 1 May 2026; 5 months | 31 October 2034 | Eastern Cape High Court; Supreme Court of Appeal | Raymond Zondo |
| Kate Savage | 10 January 1968 (age 58) in Johannesburg, Gauteng | Cyril Ramaphosa | 58 | 1 May 2026; 5 months | 10 January 2038 | Western Cape High Court; Labour Appeal Court | Mbuyiseli Madlanga |

=== Former chief justices ===
- Arthur Chaskalson (born 1931, appointed by Nelson Mandela as President of the Constitutional Court in 1994, became the Chief Justice in 2001, retired in 2005 and died in 2012)
- Pius Langa (born 1939, appointed by Nelson Mandela in 1994, elevated to Deputy President of the Court by Mandela in 1997, became Deputy Chief Justice in 2001, elevated to Chief Justice by Thabo Mbeki in 2005, retired in 2009 and died in 2013)
- Sandile Ngcobo (born 1953, appointed by Nelson Mandela in 1999 and elevated by Jacob Zuma in 2009 and retired in 2011)
- Mogoeng Mogoeng (born 1961, appointed by Jacob Zuma in 2009 and elevated in 2011 and retired in 2021)
- Raymond Zondo (born 1960, appointed by Jacob Zuma in 2012, became Deputy Chief Justice in 2017, elevated to Chief Justice by Cyril Ramaphosa in 2022 and retired in 2024)

=== Former deputy chief justices ===
- Pius Langa, appointed in 2001, elevated to Chief Justice by President Thabo Mbeki in 2005, retired in 2009, died in 2013.
- Dikgang Moseneke, appointed to the Constitutional Court in 2002 by President Thabo Mbeki, elevated to Deputy Chief Justice in 2005, a position he held until his retirement in May 2016.
- Raymond Zondo, appointed to the Constitutional Court in September 2012 by President Jacob Zuma, elevated to Deputy Chief Justice by President Jacob Zuma and later Chief Justice by President Cyril Ramaphosa as of April 2022, retired in 2024.
- Mandisa Maya, appointed to the Constitutional Court as Deputy Chief Justice in September 2022 from the position of President of the Supreme Court of Appeal by President Cyril Ramaphosa, elevated to Chief Justice in 2024.

=== Former justices ===
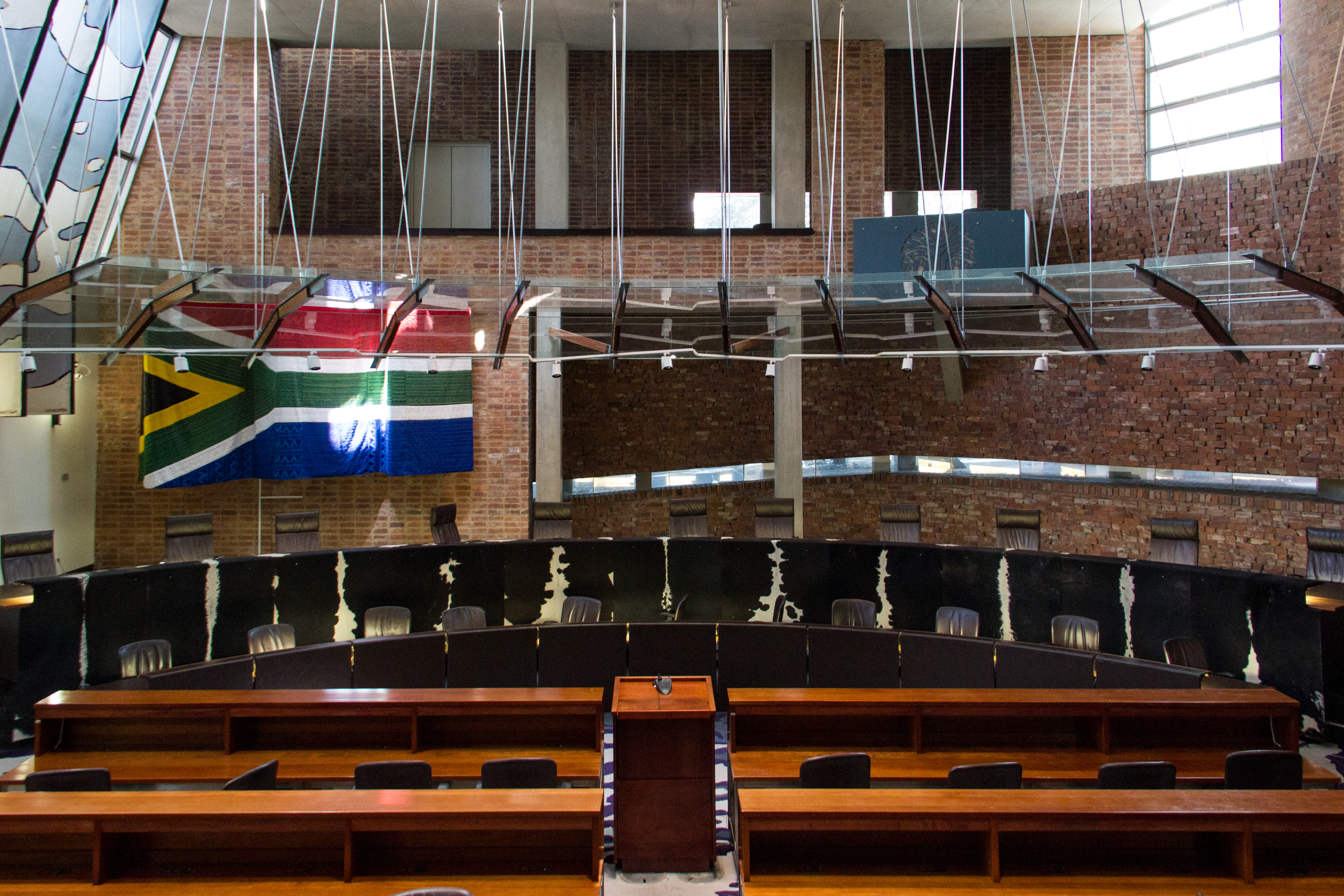
The courtroom of the Constitutional Court of South Africa

- John Didcott (born 1931, appointed by Nelson Mandela in 1995, died in office in 1998)
- Ismail Mahomed (born 1934, appointed by Nelson Mandela in 1995, elevated to Chief Justice of the Supreme Court of Appeal in 1998, died in 2000)
- Richard Goldstone (born 1938, appointed by Nelson Mandela in 1994, retired in 2003)
- Johann Kriegler (born 1932, appointed by Nelson Mandela in 1994, retired in 2003)
- Lourens Ackermann (born 1934, appointed by Nelson Mandela in 1994, retired in 2004)
- Tholie Madala (born 1937, appointed by Nelson Mandela in 1994, retired in 2008, died in 2010)
- Yvonne Mokgoro (born 1950, appointed by Nelson Mandela in 1994, retired in 2009)
- Kate O'Regan (born 1957, appointed by Nelson Mandela in 1994, retired in 2009)
- Albie Sachs (born 1935, appointed by Nelson Mandela in 1994, retired in 2009)
- Zak Yacoob (born 1948, appointed by Nelson Mandela in 1998, retired in 2013)
- Thembile Skweyiya (appointed by Thabo Mbeki in 2003, retired in 2014, died in 2015)
- Johann van der Westhuizen (appointed by Thabo Mbeki in 2004, retired in 2016)
- Bess Nkabinde (appointed by Thabo Mbeki in 2006, retired in 2018)
- Edwin Cameron (appointed by Kgalema Motlanthe in 2009, retired in 2019)
- Johan Froneman (appointed by Jacob Zuma in 2009, retired in 2020)
- Chris Jafta (appointed by Jacob Zuma in 2009, retired in 2021)
- Sisi Khampepe (appointed by Jacob Zuma in 2009, retired in 2021)
- Mbuyiseli Madlanga (appointed by Jacob Zuma in 2013, retired in 2025)

== The Constitution as the supreme law ==
The judgments of the court are based on the Constitution, which is the supreme law of the land. They enforce the basic rights and freedoms of all persons. They are binding on all organs of government, including the parliament, the presidency, the police force, the army, the public service and all courts. This means that the Court has the power to declare an Act of Parliament null and void if it conflicts with the Constitution and to control executive action in the same way.

When interpreting the Constitution, the Court is required to consider international human rights law and may consider the law of other democratic countries. Since the enactment of the Superior Courts Act, the Constitutional Court has had jurisdiction to hear any matter if it is in the interests of justice for it to do so.

== Other bodies protecting human rights ==
The Court is one of many bodies created by the Constitution to defend the rights of citizens. It is concerned with matters of broad constitutional principle. Bad or incorrect conduct by state officials can be reported to the Office of the Public Protector, formerly called the Ombudsman. The Human Rights Commission has been established to handle complaints of violation of human rights in daily life. The ordinary courts, notably the small claims courts, the Magistrates' Courts, the High Courts and the Supreme Court of Appeal, deal with day-to-day disputes between citizens and between citizens and the state.

== Co-operation with Parliament and Provincial Assemblies ==
The Constitutional Court has a special responsibility to parliament and the provincial legislatures. If there is a dispute in parliament or in a provincial legislature concerning whether or not legislation that has been passed and assented to is constitutional, a third of the members of the body concerned may apply to the Constitutional Court to give a ruling. Similarly, the President or the Premier of a Province may refer a bill to the Court for a decision on its constitutionality before assenting to that Bill.

== Proceedings in court ==
The Court does not hear evidence or question witnesses. It does not decide directly whether accused persons are guilty or whether damages should be awarded to an injured person. These are matters for the ordinary courts. Its function is to determine the meaning of the Constitution in relation to matters in dispute. One consequence of this is that the Court works largely with written arguments presented to it by the parties. The hearings of the Court are intended to address particularly difficult issues raised by the written arguments of the parties.

The hearings of the Court are open to the public and the press. No cameras or recorders are ordinarily permitted. The public is invited to attend all sessions. Ordinary rules of decent dress and decorum apply.

== Notable judgments ==
- S v Makwanyane and Another (6 June 1995): abolished the death penalty, declaring capital punishment in South Africa to be inconsistent with the Interim Constitution.
- National Coalition for Gay and Lesbian Equality v Minister of Justice (9 October 1998): overturned South Africa's sodomy law, ruling that it violated constitutional guarantees of equal protection, privacy, and dignity.
- Government of the Republic of South Africa v Grootboom (4 October 2000): the government is obliged to provide housing relief to those living in intolerable situations or in crisis situations.
- Mohamed v President of the Republic of South Africa (28 May 2001): suspects cannot be extradited under circumstances where they may face the death penalty.
- Alexkor v Richtersveld Community (14 October 2003): rights to land under customary law must be recognised, and communities dispossessed of land owned under customary law are entitled to restitution.
- Minister of Home Affairs and Another v Fourie and Another (1 December 2005): the government must recognise and allow same-sex marriage.
- Economic Freedom Fighters v Speaker of the National Assembly and Others; Democratic Alliance v Speaker of the National Assembly and Others (31 March 2016): recommendations of the Public Protector are binding.
- Minister of Justice and Constitutional Development v Prince (18 September 2018): prohibition on private cultivation and consumption of cannabis declared unconstitutional.
- Secretary of the State Capture Inquiry v Zuma (29 June 2021): Former President Jacob Zuma found guilty of contempt of court for his failure to comply with a court order requiring his cooperation with the Zondo Commission.

== Hlophe controversy ==
On 30 May 2008, the judges of the Constitutional Court issued a statement reporting that they had referred Cape Judge President Judge John Hlophe to the Judicial Service Commission for what they described in their statement as approaching some of them "in an improper attempt to influence this Court's pending judgement in one or more cases". The statement stated further that the complaint related to four matters in which either Thint (Pty) Ltd or the Deputy President, Jacob Zuma, was involved. Judge Hlophe was reported to have rejected the allegations as "utter rubbish" and as "another ploy" to damage his reputation.

Justices Chris Jafta and Bess Nkabinde had been the primary complainants and had supported the Court's complaint. Six years later, however, when the misconduct enquiry against Hlophe was pending, Jafta and Nkabinde brought a court challenge to the tribunal's jurisdiction, saying their own complaint was not legally valid. Commentators slammed Jafta and Nkabinde's "cowardice", which had brought the Constitutional Court into disrepute. The judges claimed, in response, that they were simply upholding the Constitution. The High Court dismissed the judges' application on 26 September 2014, but they appealed. The Supreme Court of Appeal dismissed that appeal in March 2016, criticising Jafta and Nkabinde's damaging court application and implying that the case raised questions about their "integrity". On 6 April 2016, Jafta and Nkabinde filed an appeal to the Constitutional Court – their own court – asking it to overturn the Supreme Court of Appeal's judgment. They did so partly on the basis that the SCA made "hurtful" imputations about them. The Constitutional Court had already held, in 2012, that it could not hear appeals in the Hlophe matter and that any SCA judgment was final.

== See also ==
- Constitutionalism
- Jurisprudence
- Judicial Service Commission (South Africa)
- Constitution Hill, Johannesburg
