= Violet Phatshoane =

South African judge

The Honourable Violet Phatshoane

Deputy Judge President of the Northern Cape High Court
- Incumbent
- Assumed office 1 July 2021
- Appointed by: Cyril Ramaphosa
- Judge President: Pule Tlaletsi

Judge of the High Court
- Incumbent
- Assumed office 10 May 2011
- Appointed by: Jacob Zuma
- Division: Northern Cape

Personal details
- Born: 28 September 1972 (age 54) Phokeng, Transvaal; South Africa
- Education: University of the North (BProc); University of the Free State (LLB, LLM)

Mmathebe Violet Phatshoane (born 20 November 1972) is a South African judge who is currently serving as Deputy Judge President of the Northern Cape High Court. She joined the court as a puisne judge in May 2011 and was appointed to the deputy judge presidency in July 2021. Before entering the judiciary, she practised as an attorney in Bloemfontein, specialising in commercial law and labour law.

Born in the North West Province, Phatshoane was admitted as an attorney in Bloemfontein in 1999 and she co-founded her own firm, PHI, in 2002. During her first decade in the High Court, she was thrice shortlisted unsuccessfully for the Deputy Judge President position, twice in 2017 and once in 2019; on each occasion, her nomination was overshadowed by allegations that former Judge President Frans Kgomo had intervened in the appointment process in her favour. After a fourth nomination, she secured the deputy judge presidency in July 2021, appointed by President Cyril Ramaphosa.

== Early life and education ==
Phatshoane was born on 20 November 1972 in Phokeng outside Rustenburg in present-day North West Province. She completed a BProc at the University of the North in 1995 and went on to the University of the Free State, graduating with an LLB in 1997 and an LLM in 1999. In 1996, while studying towards her LLB, Phatshoane was a legal researcher to Justice Pierre J. J. Olivier, a judge of appeal in the Appellate Division of the Supreme Court of South Africa.

== Legal career ==
Between 1997 and 1999, while her LLM was in progress, Phatshoane served her articles of clerkship at Naudes Attorneys in Bloemfontein; she was admitted as an attorney of the High Court of South Africa in 1999. Thereafter she remained at the firm as an attorney, becoming a director in 2000. In 2002, she and Douglas Henney founded their own firm, Phatshoane Henny Inc. (PHI), in Bloemfontein. The PHI Group grew to an exceptional size, and Phatshoane was its chairperson until her appointment to the bench in May 2011.

She specialised in commercial law and labour law, and she was a part-time commissioner at the Commission for Conciliation, Mediation and Arbitration from 1999 to 2004. She was additionally enrolled as a notary and conveyancer in 2009. She lectured part-time in advanced labour law at the University of the Free State between 2006 and 2009, and she was an acting judge in the High Court's Northern Cape Division in 2010.

== Northern Cape High Court: 2011–present ==
On 10 May 2011, President Jacob Zuma announced that, on the advice of the Judicial Service Commission, Phatshoane would join the Northern Cape High Court bench permanently, with immediate effect.

=== John Block corruption trial ===
In the Kimberley High Court, Phatshoane presided in the highly publicised corruption trial of three prominent Northern Cape politicians – John Block, Alvin Botes, and (until her death) Yolanda Botha – who pled not guilty at the outset of the trial in February 2014. At an early stage of the trial, Phatshoane dismissed the defendants' application for her recusal, finding no merit to their argument that she had demonstrated herself to be biased in her ruling against their acquittal. After a lengthy trial, Phatshoane convicted Block of corruption, fraud, and money laundering in October 2015, though Botes was acquitted; he was sentenced to a lengthy prison sentence in December 2016.

The sentencing was delayed after Block lodged a complaint against Phatshoane with the Judicial Service Commission, alleging that her judgement had been improperly influenced by Frans Kgomo, the Judge President of the Northern Cape Division. In particular, an eyewitness had apparently told Block's lawyer that, during a phone call about Block, Kgomo had urged Phatshoane to "Convict the bastard". Phatshoane and Kgomo both denied having had any such conversation, as did the alleged eyewitness (attorney Nano Matlata), and the Judicial Service Commission dismissed the complaint against Phatshoane. In subsequent years, Kgomo sued Block, alleging that his allegation had been defamatory.

=== Labour Courts ===
During her service in the High Court, Phatshoane has served lengthy stints as an acting judge in the labour courts. She acted in the Labour Court in 2013 and 2015 and in the Labour Appeal Court between August 2016 and May 2017, writing several reported judgements. She was the acting Deputy Judge President of the Labour Courts from January to December 2018 and then from May to December 2020; in that capacity, serving under Cape Town-based Judge President Basheer Waglay, she ran the Labour Courts' Johannesburg circuit.

=== Deputy Judge Presidency ===
In April 2017, as Kgomo's retirement approached, Phatshoane was one of two candidates whom the Judicial Service Commission shortlisted and interviewed for potential appointment as Deputy Judge President of the Northern Cape Division. During her interview, the politicians on the panel – including Faith Muthambi and Dikgang Stock – also questioned Phatshoane at length about her conduct in the Block corruption trial, including her dismissal of the application for recusal. Among other things, she told the panel that her judgement in that matter had contributed to jurisprudence by addressing a "lacuna" in the Prevention and Combating of Corrupt Activities Act. She was also asked about her relative youth, but she said that she was confident that she could "command authority" and did not "foresee any resistance from my colleagues".

However, the major topic of the interview was the last-minute withdrawal of the other candidate, Northern Cape Judge Cecile Williams. In regard to this, Chief Justice Mogoeng Mogoeng asked Phatshoane about rumours – repeated by Williams in a letter to the commission – that Judge President Kgomo had been "grooming" Phatshoane for the deputy judge presidency and as his preferred successor. Phatshoane denied that the Northern Cape Division had been "factionalised", but she said that Williams had upset one of their mutual colleagues by refusing to help with an Afrikaans translation. After the Judicial Service Commission hearings, although Williams's withdrawal left Phatshoane as the only candidate for that vacancy, the Judicial Service Commission declined to recommend her as suitable for appointment.

Nonetheless, during the transition period occasioned by Kgomo's retirement, Phatshoane served as acting Judge President from June to July 2017 and then as acting Deputy Judge President from July to December 2017. During that period, the Judicial Service Commission re-ran its appointment process for the deputy judge presidency, this time with Phatshoane and Judge Bulelwa Pakati as the two shortlisted candidates. However, those interviews, held in October 2017, were also disrupted by allegations of interference by former Judge President Kgomo, who had written to the Judicial Service Commission to outline Pakati's shortcomings of intellect and temperament. In response, Pakati told the interview panel that there were severe divisions in the Northern Cape Division, partly caused by Kgomo's ambitions for Phatshoane; asked whether Phatshoane was perceived as the Northern Cape's "anointed one", Pakati replied in the affirmative. Although Kgomo's intervention was not discussed during Phatshoane's own interview, the interviews ended with the Judicial Service Commission again declining to recommend a candidate for appointment.

A year and a half later, in April 2019, both Phatshoane and Pakati were shortlisted again for the position, which remained vacant, and, again, neither candidate was recommended for appointment. Over the next two years, Phatshoane was acting Deputy Judge President from July to October 2019 and from August to December 2020, and she also stood in for Judge President Pule Tlaletsi as acting Judge President from September to October 2019 and from February to March 2021.

In February 2021, the Judicial Service Commission announced that it would embark on a fourth attempt to fill the Deputy Judge President position and, on that occasion, Phatshoane was the only shortlisted candidate. She was interviewed in April and was asked about the Block trial, her approach to politically sensitive matters, and her leadership experience. The Judicial Service Commission recommended her for appointment, and President Cyril Ramaphosa confirmed her appointment as Deputy Judge President with effect from 1 July 2021.

=== Supreme Court of Appeal ===
Phatshoane was an acting judge in the Supreme Court of Appeal between April and September 2021 and later between April and May 2022. Three of her judgements in the Supreme Court were reported, and they included the court's majority decision in Eskom v Letsemeng Local Municipality, which concerned Letsemeng Local Municipality's debt to the electricity utility Eskom.

In October 2023, she was shortlisted and interviewed for possible permanent appointment to one of four judicial vacancies at the Supreme Court of Appeal. During the interview, members of the Judicial Service Commission raised concerns about Phatshoane's level of experience. Justice Minister Ronald Lamola also suggested that it would be a "setback" for gender equality in the judiciary if Phatshoane left her leadership position in the High Court. On the latter point, Phatshoane argued – with the support of commissioner Tembeka Ngcukaitobi – that it was not fair for women to be "locked up" in their positions and that her elevation would in fact promote gender equality. However, Chief Justice Raymond Zondo responded that his main concern was the stability of the Northern Cape Division, not gender equality. At the conclusion of the interviews, the Judicial Service Commission announced that it would recommend filling only two of the vacancies, endorsing Shane Kgoele and Fayeeza Kathree-Setiloane for elevation. Some commentators objected to this decision, arguing that some of the other candidates, including Phatshoane, were no less qualified than Kgoele was.

== Other activities ==
Phatshoane is a member of the South African chapter of the International Association of Women Judges, and she was its vice-president of programmes from August 2012 to August 2014. She joined the council of Sol Plaatje University in Kimberley in June 2014, and in July 2021 she was appointed to succeed Yvonne Mokgoro as the university's chairperson; she will serve a four-year term, ending in April 2025.
