= List of judgments of the Constitutional Court of South Africa delivered in 2014 =

The table below lists the judgments of the Constitutional Court of South Africa delivered in 2014.

The members of the court at the start of 2014 were Chief Justice Mogoeng Mogoeng, Deputy Chief Justice Dikgang Moseneke, and judges Edwin Cameron, Johan Froneman, Chris Jafta, Sisi Khampepe, Mbuyiseli Madlanga, Bess Nkabinde, Thembile Skweyiya, Johann van der Westhuizen and Raymond Zondo. Justice Skweyiya retired in May.

Citation	Case name	Heard	Decided	Majority author
[2014] ZACC 1	Kubyana v Standard Bank of South Africa Ltd	7 November 2013	20 February 2014	Mhlantla (acting)
[2014] ZACC 2	Ronald Bobroff & Partners Inc v De La Guerre; South African Association of Personal Injury Lawyers v Minister of Justice and Constitutional Development and Another		20 February 2014	The Court
[2014] ZACC 3	Estate Agency Affairs Board v Auction Alliance (Pty) Ltd and Others	18 November 2013	27 February 2014	Cameron
[2014] ZACC 4	Loureiro and Others v iMvula Quality Protection (Pty) Ltd	6 November 2013	20 March 2014	Van der Westhuizen
[2014] ZACC 5	Savoi and Others v National Director of Public Prosecutions and Another	11 November 2013	20 March 2014	Madlanga
[2014] ZACC 6	MEC for Health, Eastern Cape and Another v Kirkland Investments (Pty) Ltd	12 November 2013	25 March 2014	Cameron
[2014] ZACC 7	Mdodana v Premier of the Eastern Cape and Others	13 November 2013	25 March 2014	Dambuza (acting)
[2014] ZACC 8	South African Informal Traders Forum and Others v City of Johannesburg and Others; South African National Traders Retail Association v City of Johannesburg and Others	5 December 2013	4 April 2014	Moseneke
[2014] ZACC 9	Minister of Local Government, Environmental Affairs and Development Planning, Western Cape v The Habitat Council and Others; Minister of Local Government, Environmental Affairs and Development Planning, Western Cape v City of Cape Town and Others	10 February 2014	4 April 2014	Cameron
[2014] ZACC 11	Botha and Another v Rich NO and Others	20 November 2013	17 April 2014	Nkabinde
[2014] ZACC 12	AllPay Consolidated Investment Holdings (Pty) Ltd and Others v Chief Executive Officer of the South African Social Security Agency and Others (No 2)	11 February 2014	17 April 2014	Froneman
[2014] ZACC 13	J v National Director of Public Prosecutions and Another	6 February 2014	6 May 2014	Skweyiya
[2014] ZACC 14	Ngqukumba v Minister of Safety and Security and Others	14 November 2013	15 May 2014	Madlanga
[2014] ZACC 15	Molaudzi v S		20 May 2014	The Court
[2014] ZACC 16	Cool Ideas 1186 CC v Hubbard and Another	5 February 2014	5 June 2014	Majiedt (acting)
[2014] ZACC 17	Zulu and Others v eThekwini Municipality and Others	12 February 2014	6 June 2014	Zondo
[2014] ZACC 18	Minister of Defence and Military Veterans v Motau and Others	17 February 2014	10 June 2014	Khampepe
[2014] ZACC 19	Sali v National Commissioner of the South African Police Service and Others	10 March 2014	19 June 2014	Cameron
[2014] ZACC 20	De Klerk v Griekwaland Wes Korporatief Bpk	13 May 2014	19 June 2014	Van der Westhuizen
[2014] ZACC 21	Da Silva v Road Accident Fund and Another		19 June 2014	Froneman
[2014] ZACC 22	Florence v Government of the Republic of South Africa	18 February 2014	26 August 2014	Moseneke
[2014] ZACC 23	South African Police Service v Solidarity obo Barnard	20 March 2014	2 September 2014	Moseneke
[2014] ZACC 24	Turnbull-Jackson v Hibiscus Coast Municipality and Others	4 February 2014	11 September 2014	Madlanga
[2014] ZACC 25	Malan v City of Cape Town	20 February 2014	18 September 2014	Majiedt (acting)
[2014] ZACC 26	Stopforth Swanepoel & Brewis Incorporated v Royal Anthem Investments 129 (Pty) Ltd and Others		2 October 2014	Nkabinde
[2014] ZACC 27	Nxumalo v President of the Republic of South Africa and Others		2 October 2014	Zondo
[2014] ZACC 28	Country Cloud Trading CC v MEC, Department of Infrastructure Development, Gauteng	20 May 2014	3 October 2014	Khampepe
[2014] ZACC 29	MC Denneboom Service Station CC and Another v Phayane		3 October 2014	Khampepe
[2014] ZACC 30	National Commissioner of the South African Police Service v Southern African Human Rights Litigation Centre and Another	19 May 2014	30 October 2014	Majiedt (acting)
[2014] ZACC 31	Ngaka Modiri Molema District Municipality v Chairperson, North West Provincial Executive Committee and Others		18 November 2014	The Court
[2014] ZACC 32	Helen Suzman Foundation v President of the Republic of South Africa and Others; Glenister v President of the Republic of South Africa and Others	19 August 2014	27 November 2014	Mogoeng
[2014] ZACC 33	Khohliso v S and Another	21 August 2014	2 December 2014	Van der Westhuizen
[2014] ZACC 34	H v Fetal Assessment Centre	28 August 2014	11 December 2014	Froneman
[2014] ZACC 35	National Union of Metal Workers of South Africa v Intervalve (Pty) Ltd and Others	4 September 2014	12 December 2014	Cameron
[2014] ZACC 36	Bapedi Marota Mamone v Commission on Traditional Leadership Disputes and Claims and Others	26 August 2014	15 December 2014	Khampepe
[2014] ZACC 37	Arun Property Development (Pty) Ltd v City of Cape Town	9 September 2014	15 December 2014	Moseneke
[2014] ZACC 38	Stratford and Others v Investec Bank Limited and Others	2 September 2014	19 December 2014	Leeuw (acting)
