= Frans Kgomo (Northern Cape judge) =

South African judge (born 1947)

Judge President of the Northern Cape High Court
- In office 1 November 2001 – 17 September 2017
- Appointed by: Thabo Mbeki
- Succeeded by: Pule Tlaletsi

Judge of the High Court
- In office 1 November 1998 – 17 September 2017
- Appointed by: Nelson Mandela
- Division: Northern Cape

Personal details
- Born: Frans Diale Kgomo; 17 September 1947 (age 79) Brits, Transvaal; Union of South Africa
- Education: University of Bophuthatswana

Frans Diale Kgomo (born 17 September 1947) is a South African retired judge who was the Judge President of the Northern Cape High Court between November 2001 and September 2017. He joined the bench in November 1998 as the first black judge of that court. Before that, he was a lawyer in the North West Province, working as a magistrate from 1974 to 1986 and then as an advocate from 1986 to 1998.

== Early life and education ==
Kgomo was born on 17 September 1947 in Brits in present-day North West Province. He attended Maruatona Primary School in nearby Wonderkop and matriculated in 1968 at the Bafokeng High School in Rustenburg. Thereafter he studied law at the University of Zululand, where he completed a Diploma Iuris in 1973 and a Diploma Legum in 1977, and at the University of Bophuthatswana, where he completed a Bachelor of Laws in 1985.

== Legal career ==
Shortly after his high school matriculation, in 1969, Kgomo began his legal career as a court clerk and interpreter at the Commissioner's Court in Brits. He continued to work in the courts while studying law, becoming a prosecutor in 1972 and a magistrate in 1974; he was promoted to regional magistrate in 1982.

After completing his LLB in 1985, Kgomo was admitted as an advocate in 1986 and left the magistracy to practise at the North West Bar in Mafikeng. He joined the National Association of Democratic Lawyers in 1989 and Lawyers for Human Rights in 1990, and he was the chairman of the North West Bar Council between 1997 and 1998. In 1998, he was appointed for the first time as an acting judge in the High Court of South Africa.

== Northern Cape High Court: 1998–2017 ==
On 1 November 1998, Kgomo joined the bench permanently as a judge of the Northern Cape Division of the High Court. He was the division's first black judge. After three years as a puisne judge, he was promoted to the position of Judge President of the division with effect from 1 November 2001.

=== Notable judgments ===
In mid-2001, Kgomo was seconded to Pretoria High Court, where he heard two high-profile cases brought by lesbian judges of the Gauteng Division. In the first matter, he ruled in favour of Anna-Marie de Vos and her partner in finding that provisions of the Child Care Act and the Guardianship Act were unconstitutional insofar as they prohibited same-sex couples from jointly adopting children. In the second matter, he ruled in favour of Kathy Satchwell in finding that provisions of the Judges' Remuneration and Conditions of Employment Act were unconstitutional insofar as they discriminated against the same-sex life partners of judges. Kgomo's judgments in both matters were upheld by the Constitutional Court of South Africa in 2002, in Du Toit v Minister for Welfare and Population Development and Satchwell v President of the Republic of South Africa respectively.

In February 2007, in the Kimberley High Court, Kgomo convicted Joseph le Grange of the murder of a teenage boy who had been stabbed in Prieska in March 2004. However, in September 2008, the Supreme Court of Appeal held unanimously that Kgomo had not granted le Grange and his alleged accessories a fair trial, with Judge of Appeal Nathan Ponnan writing that Kgomo "was not fair and impartial", that his approach was "certainly suggestive of one who has certain preconceived biases and allows those biases to affect his judgment", and that "he sought, it would seem, from time to time to expedite the hearing of the matter by virtually taking over the prosecution from counsel for the State". The Supreme Court of Appeal referred the matter back to the High Court, instructing that Kgomo should not participate in the proceedings.

Later that year, in December 2008, Kgomo, sitting as an acting Judge of Appeal, wrote on behalf of a unanimous bench of the Supreme Court of Appeal in S v van Aardt, an important judgment on dolus eventualis in criminal law.

=== 2008 Judicial Service Commission hearing ===
In October 2008, the Judicial Service Commission shortlisted Kgomo both for possible elevation to the Supreme Court of Appeal and for possible elevation to Justice Tholie Madala's former seat in the Constitutional Court. The Mail & Guardian said that Kgomo was viewed as one of the weakest Constitutional Court nominees, and he was also expected to face tough questioning on his conduct in the le Grange murder conviction, which had recently been overturned by the Supreme Court. He was interviewed at a Judicial Service Commission hearing in Cape Town, during which he apologised for mistakes he had made during the le Grange trial. However, many of the commissioners expressed concern, including opposition politician Koos van der Merwe, who told Kgomo outright that he would argue that he was not "fit and proper" to serve as an appellate judge. Commissioner Lindiwe Hendricks also raised a negative submission from the bar, which had raised concerns about Kgomo's "temperament"; Kgomo disputed the accuracy of the submission, pointing out that the bar had supported his elevation to the judge presidency.

Because other candidates had withdrawn from contention, there were only four candidates for the Constitutional Court vacancy: Kgomo and Judges Edwin Cameron, Shenaz Meer, and Nigel Willis. However, the Judicial Service Commission declined to make a recommendation to the President, saying that it could not fulfil its obligation to recommend four candidates as suitable for appointment. Anonymous commissioners told the Mail & Guardian that the majority of members had felt that Kgomo was not "appointable". Kgomo likewise did not gain elevation to the Supreme Court; Suretta Snyders and Nonkosi Mhlantla were appointed instead.

=== Controversies ===
Between 2006 and 2008, Kgomo was embroiled in a dispute with two judges of his division, Judges Steven Majiedt and Hennie Lacock, which arose when Kgomo recommended that Pule Tlaletsi, a relatively junior judge, should be appointed as acting Judge President while he (Kgomo) took leave. In 2006, Kgomo laid a complaint against Majiedt and Lacock with the Judicial Service Commission in 2006, alleging that they had insulted him – in particular, Majiedt was accused of having called Kgomo a "sly, devious, conniving person, but also a coward", motivated by "sheer racism and malice", in a text message. Majiedt laid a counter-complaint of discrimination, racism, and nepotism against Kgomo. The dispute was resolved in October 2008 without formal censure against any of the parties, though the Judicial Service Commission urged Kgomo "to act in an open and collegial spirit in carrying out his duties as Judge President".

In December 2016, politician John Block named Kgomo in a misconduct complaint he lodged before the Judicial Service Commission. He alleged that Judge Violet Phatshoane, who had recently convicted him of corruption, had been improperly influenced by Kgomo, who, according to a putative eyewitness, had urged Phatshoane to "Convict the bastard". Phatshoane and Kgomo both denied having had any such conversation, and the alleged eyewitness (attorney Nano Matlata) also denied any knowledge of such a conversation; the Judicial Service Commission dismissed the complaint against Phatshoane. However, in 2019, Kgomo sued Block and two implicated attorneys for defamation. The defamation case opened in the Northern Cape High Court in 2023.

On two occasions in 2017, as Kgomo's retirement approached, the Judicial Service Commission discussed rumours that Kgomo had interfered inappropriately in the process to appoint new leaders in the Northern Cape Division; in particular, he was accused of "grooming" Judge Phatshoane as his preferred successor.

== Retirement ==
Kgomo retired from the judiciary on his 70th birthday on 17 September 2017. The following month, Police Minister Fikile Mbalula announced that he had been appointed to succeed the late judge Essa Moosa as the head of the complaints unit of the Directorate for Priority Crime Investigation.

== Personal life ==
He is married to Florence Tselane Jenny Moeketsane and has five children.
