= Women's Legal Centre Trust v President =

Women's Legal Centre Trust v President (in full Women's Legal Centre Trust v President of the Republic of South Africa and Others) is the title of two related decisions of the Constitutional Court of South Africa:

- Women's Legal Centre Trust v President (2009), concerning direct access to the court
- Women's Legal Centre Trust v President (2022), concerning the legal status of Muslim marriages
