= Hassam =

Hassam may refer to:

- Childe Hassam (1859–1935), an American impressionist painter
- Hassam Al Doubaykhi, a Saudi prisoner at the United States Guantanamo Bay Naval Base
- Hassam-ud-Din Rashidi, (1911–1982), a Pakistani journalist
- Umm Al Hassam, a neighborhood in Bahrain
- Hassam, Rasulpur, a village in Pakistan
- Hassam v Jacobs, a South African legal precedent
