= South African family law =

Legal rules pertaining to familial relationships

South African family law is concerned with those legal rules in South Africa which pertain to familial relationships. It may be defined as "that subdivision of material private law which researches, describes and regulates the origin, contents and dissolution of all legal relationships between: (i) husband and wife (including the parties to a civil union); (ii) parents, guardians (and other holders of parental rights and responsibilities) and children; and (iii) relatives related through blood and affinity."

"As far as family law is concerned, we in South Africa have it all. We have every kind of family; extended families, nuclear families, one-parent families, same-sex families, and in relation to each one of these there are controversy, difficulties and cases coming before the courts or due to come before the courts. This is the result of ancient history and recent history [...]. Our families are suffused with history, as family law is suffused with history, culture, belief and personality. For researchers it's a paradise, for judges a purgatory."

— Albie Sachs

== Subdivisions ==
There are various branches of family law, among them

- the law of engagement;
- matrimonial law and the law of civil unions;
- matrimonial property law;
- the law of divorce; and
- the law of parenting.

== Marriage ==
Marriage is the act by which a marriage relationship is formed, and which defines the relationship created by that act. The act and the relationship are interrelated: The former requires an intention to create the latter, and the consequences of the latter flow from the nature of the former.

=== Development ===
Ancient Rome distinguished between two forms of marriage: the matrimonium non-iustum and the iustae nuptiae (or iustum matrimonium). The former concerned a relationship between one man and one woman who intended to marry but could not do so in terms of Roman law; the latter dealt with formally recognised marriages.

Marriage between the Continental peoples under early Germanic law bore a close resemblance to that of the lobolo marriage in terms of the customary law of South African indigenous peoples.

In the late Middle Ages, marriage fell under the jurisdiction of the Roman Catholic Church. This still has some practical consequences in modern South African law. In terms of canon law, marriage was a sacrament and a grace of God to the spouses, and could not be dissolved by any human agency. Divorce, in other words, was almost entirely unlawful.

After the Reformation, the rigidities of Catholic marriage began to fall away, and the institution became more secularised, as other systems of marriage were introduced. The province of Holland seems to have been the first European jurisdiction to permit civil marriages. This impact of this on South African law may be gauged from the fact that the country's common law is based primarily on Roman-Dutch law. The basic premises of the Political Ordinance of 1580 still form the basis for the contemporary South African law of marriage, which, while generally located in the private sphere, often crosses over into other areas for the law: for example, the criminal and the constitutional.

=== Definition ===
The traditional definition of marriage is a "legally recognised life-long voluntary union between one man and one woman to the exclusion of all other persons," or "a union of one man and one woman who mutually agree to live together as spouses until the marriage is dissolved by the death of one of them or as otherwise provided by law." In light of recent constitutional developments in South Africa, this definition has been found to be inadequate, particularly as regards its assumptions against polygamy and same-sex life partnerships: In Minister of Home Affairs v Fourie, it was declared unconstitutional.

==== "One man and one woman" ====
The Supreme Court of Appeal, in Fourie v Minister of Home Affairs, held that the common-law definition of marriage deprived committed same-sex couples of the option of marriage and thus denied them its many rights and protections. This discrimination, on grounds of gender and religion and sexual orientation, was found to be unfair, in that it violated the constitutional right to equality and other guarantees in the Bill of Rights. The court held further that the Marriage Act had been passed on the assumption that the common-law definition applied only to opposite-sex marriage. The common law had to be developed to embrace same-sex partners by redefining marriage as the "union of two persons to the exclusion of all others for life." This type of marriage is now capable of full recognition as a legally valid marriage, provided that the formalities in the Marriage Act are complied with.

In Lesbian and Gay Equality Project v Minister of Home Affairs, the Marriage Act as well as the common-law definition were challenged. The Constitutional Court held that it was clearly in the interests of justice that it be heard together with the Fourie case. Setting aside the order of the SCA in Fourie's case, the court declared that the common-law definition of marriage was unconstitutional and invalid to the extent that it does not permit same-sex couples to enjoy the same status, benefits and responsibilities as those accorded to heterosexual couples.

The court was unanimous on the point that the omission from the Marriage Act, after the words "or husband," of the words "or spouse" was inconsistent with the Constitution; section 30(1) of the Marriage Act was therefore invalidated to the extent of the inconsistency. This declaration was suspended for twelve months from the date of the judgment, until 1 December 2006, to allow Parliament to enact remedial legislation. If Parliament failed to do so, section 30(1) would automatically be read thenceforth as including the words "or spouse" after the words "or husband."

==== "To the exclusion of all other persons" ====
Exclusivity is not a universal characteristic of marriage; it is a special characteristic of Western civil law and the Anglo-American common law marriage.

==== "To live together as spouses" ====
This part of the definition concerns "the very heart of the matter," which is to say the object or purpose of marriage. In Christianity, it is intended for the glory of God and other religions, for the avoidance of fornication, for procreation, and to provide for the other partner by help and assistance. These aims are also reflected in Roman-Dutch law. The consortium omnis vitae refers to all the duties which fall under the relationship of married spouses.

==== Dissolution as provided by law ====
Death dissolves a marriage, but the law provides also for dissolution by the high court on some ground which renders the marriage voidable, or following upon an order presuming the death of the one spouse, or on some ground arising after marriage which is recognised as a ground for divorce.

=== Nature ===
Marriage has its foundations in a variety of bailiwicks beyond the legal realm, including philosophy, religion, culture and social practice. In Rattigan v Chief Immigration Officer, Zimbabwe, Gubbay CJ described marriage as

a juristic act sui generis. It gives rise to a physical, moral and spiritual community of life - a consortium omnis vitae. It obliges the husband and wife to live together for life (more realistically, for as long as the marriage endures) and to confer sexual privileges exclusively upon each other [...]. The duties of cohabitation, loyalty, fidelity and mutual assistance and support flow from the marital relationship. To live together as spouses in community of life, to afford each other marital privileges and to be ever faithful, are the inherent commands which lie at the very heart of marriage.

Although a Zimbabwean case, Rattigan is widely cited in South African jurisprudence; it continues:

Marriages are almost invariably entered into by parties who have deep affection for one another and who intend to devote the remainder of their lives together. Although the condition of matrimony does not, as a concept of law, make the spouses one flesh—una caro—it nonetheless embodies the obligations to found a home, to cohabit, to have children and to live together as a family unit. It is the most fundamental institution known to mankind—"the first step from barbarism" and "the true basis of human progress".

Gubbay also cited in Rattigan the words of Justice Field in Maynard v Hill, which characterised marriage as

an institution, in the maintenance of which in its purity the public is deeply interested, for it is the foundation of the family and of society, without which there would be neither civilisation nor progress [...]. It is [...] a social relation, like that of parent and child, the obligations of which arise not from the consent of concurring minds, but are the creation of the law itself, a relation the most important, as affecting the happiness of individuals, the first step from barbarism to incipient civilisation, the purest tie of social life, and the true basis of human progress.

That marriage is still held in high regard by modern society is reflected in such cases as Kuhn v Karp, Ex parte Inkley and Inkley and Van der Westhuizen v Van der Westhuizen In Ryland v Edros, Farlam J indicated the need for South African family law to recognise diversity in marriage forms and the possibility of a pluralistic recognition of different forms of marriage, including the potentially polygamous Muslim marriage.

The centrality of marriage to many lives, and the centrality to marriage of cohabitation, was further emphasised in the Constitutional Court by O'Regan J in Dawood, Shalabi and Thomas v Minister of Home Affairs. Although the Constitution itself does not expressly protect the right to family life or the right of spouses to cohabit,Volks v Robinson the constitutional right to human dignity has been found to encompass and protect the right of individuals to enter into permanent relationships, including the right to marry. To prohibit such a relationship, and thus to impair the spouses in their duty of cohabitation, would be to frustrate them in their personal fulfilment, and hence would amount to a limitation on the right to dignity. Whether or not such a limitation is constitutional will depend, in terms of the Constitution, on whether or not it is reasonable and justifiable in an open and democratic society.

Although the Constitution gives no explicit recognition to the right to marry, South Africa is a signatory to various international instruments which do. In terms of the International Covenant on Civil and Political Rights,

1. The family is the natural and fundamental group unit of society and is entitled to protection by society and the State.
2. The right of men and women of marriageable age to marry and to found a family shall be recognized.
3. No marriage shall be entered into without the free and full consent of the intending spouses.

Similarly, the African Commission on Human and Peoples' Rights provides that

1. The family shall be the natural unit and basis of society. It shall be protected by the State which shall take care of its physical health and moral.
2. The State shall have the duty to assist the family which is the custodian of morals and traditional values recognized by the community.

Finally, according to the Universal Declaration of Human Rights, "The family is the natural and fundamental group unit of society and is entitled to protection by society and the State."

In Volks v Robinson, endorsing Dawood and enumerating these instruments, the court found that "there can be no doubt that our Constitution recognises the institution of marriage." It cited a provision in the Bill of Rights which, "in substance," provides for "marriages concluded under any tradition, or a system of religious, personal or family law." The court concluded that "both the Constitution and international instruments impose an obligation on our country to protect the institution of marriage." This is in line with the establishment of "a new legal landscape consistent with the values of diversity, tolerance of difference and the concern for human dignity expressed in the Constitution."

=== Types ===
==== Civil marriage ====
Civil marriages are concluded in terms of the Marriage Act or the Civil Union Act, and are not associated by the law with any particular religion. They are monogamous by definition.

==== Customary marriage ====
Customary marriages are those concluded in accordance with customary law, which is defined in the Recognition of Customary Marriages Act as "the customs and usages traditionally observed among the indigenous African peoples of South Africa and which form part of the culture of those peoples."

Prior to the year 2000, customary marriages enjoyed only limited recognition, polygamy being contra bonos mores. Since 2000, however, they have enjoyed full recognition under the Act. This is in line with the provision in the Constitution for "marriages concluded under any tradition, or a system of religious, personal or family law." Customary marriages are now valid and in all respects equal in status to civil marriage, so that the Act is similar in its consequences and regulations to the Marriage Act and Civil Union Act, although the requirements for a valid marriage are different.

South African law, generally speaking, does not permit polygamous marriages. The Act provides the only exception to this rule, in that it allows for polygyny, but only if it has been concluded under customary law and complies with the provisions of the Act. The constitutionality of polygamy and lobolo is a contentious issue, requiring their balance against the rights of equality and of dignity.

==== Muslim marriage ====
A Muslim marriage is one concluded in terms of Islamic religious law or rites.

===== Statutory recognition =====
Muslim marriages enjoy some statutory recognition under the Criminal Procedure Act (CPA) and the Children's Act. In terms of the former, "for the purposes of the law of evidence in criminal proceedings, 'marriage' shall include [...] any marriage concluded under any system of religious law." In terms of the latter,

"marriage" means a marriage—

(a) recognised in terms of South African law or customary law; or
(b) concluded in accordance with a system of religious law subject to specified procedures,

and any reference to a husband, wife, widower, widow, divorced person, married person or spouse must be construed accordingly.

There is, however, no express recognition, so that statutes are generally interpreted by the judiciary to include Muslim marriages.

In Daniels v Campbell, an application was made for confirmation of an order of the Cape High Court which had declared invalid and unconstitutional certain provisions of the Maintenance Act and the Intestate Succession Act for their failure to recognise as "spouses" persons married according to Muslim rites. Sachs held that the word "spouse" in its ordinary meaning includes parties to a Muslim marriage, because such a reading corresponds to the way the word is generally understood and used, and because it would be far more awkward from a linguistic point of view to exclude parties to a Muslim marriage from the word "spouse" than to include them. The historic exclusion did not flow from the courts giving the word its ordinary meaning but from a linguistically strained use of the word flowing from a particular cultural and racial approach, owing more to prejudice than to the English language, so that both the impact and the intent of the restricted interpretation was discriminatory.

In Women's Legal Centre Trust v President of the Republic of South Africa it fell to the Constitutional Court to decide whether the President and Parliament had failed in their exclusive constitutional obligation to enact legislation governing Muslim marriages. The court found that the obligation in fact did not fall exclusively on Parliament and the President, and that, in terms of the Constitution, the court did not have exclusive jurisdiction to entertain the application. The question, therefore, of whether or not Parliament and the President are under an obligation (even if not exclusive) to recognise Muslim marriage, and whether or not such legislation would be consistent with the Constitution, went unanswered.

===== Judicial recognition =====
Before the new constitutional dispensation, the recognition of Muslim marriages was regarded as a "retrograde step and entirely immoral." The Appellate Division, in Ismail v Ismail, noted, "in passing, that it seems unlikely that the non-recognition of polygamous unions will cause any real hardship to the members of the Muslim community, except, perhaps, in isolated instances." This was rejected in Hassam v Jacobs.

The Cape Provincial Division, in Ryland v Edros, held that a court may recognise and enforce contractual obligations arising out of Muslim marriages, provided that those marriages are monogamous. In Amod v MMVF, the action was for payment of damages and loss of support after the death of a spouse, married in terms of Islamic law and not registered under Marriage Act. The duty of support was found to be legally enforceable for monogamous Muslim marriages, but the issue of polygyny was left open. It was in Kahn v Kahn that spouses in polygynous Muslim marriages were finally held, in terms of the Maintenance Act, to have a legally enforceable duty of support to one another.

In Hassam v Jacobs, the issue was whether or not the benefits provided by the Intestate Succession Act and the Maintenance Act accrue to surviving spouses of polygynous Muslim marriages. The objective of the acts is to ensure that widows receive at least a child's share instead of being precariously dependent on family benevolence. The Cape High Court found that the Intestate Succession Act, in discriminating on grounds of gender and religion and marital status, was inconsistent with the Constitution. The word "spouse" in the Act would be interpreted henceforth to include spouses in polygynous Muslim marriages, while "survivor" in the Maintenance Act would be read to include surviving partners of polygynous Muslim marriages. In the Constitutional Court, however, it was found that "spouse" was not reasonably capable of being understood to include more than one spouse in the context of polygynous Muslim marriages. The words "or spouses," therefore, are to be read in after each use of the word "spouse" in the Act.

In summary, the constitutional validity of polygamy has not been subject to judicial scrutiny—indeed, it has been avoided—and the current position is that Muslim marriages receive only limited recognition in South African law. In the Draft Muslim Marriages Bill, there are both provisions in support of recognition and provisions against it.

==== Hindu marriage ====
Singh v Ramparsad dealt with a marriage in terms of the Vedic sect of religious Hindu marriage, and an application for an order declaring

1. that the Marriage Act recognises the solemnisation or validity of Hindu marriage; and, in the alternative,
2. that section 11(3) of the Act is unconstitutional.

The application was dismissed on grounds of legal impossibility. A marriage concluded in terms of religious law, and compliant with the civil requirements, enjoys dual validity. The secular dissolution of such a marriage in terms of the Divorce Act does not have the effect of dissolving the religious marriage if, as is usually the case, that religion has its own specific requirements for dissolution. The only means for dissolving such a marriage would be to attack successfully the non-recognition of divorce in Hindu religious law. The courts could not and would not interfere in this regard.

In Govender v Ragavayah, the court dealt with an application for an order declaring a Hindu widow to be recognised as a spouse in terms of Intestate Succession Act. This it granted, reading the word "spouse" in the Act to include partners in monogamous Hindu marriages.

==== Domestic partnerships ====
===== Opposite-sex domestic partnerships =====
A domestic partnership is defined by "living together outside marriage in a relationship which is analogous to, or has most of the characteristics of a marriage."

The status quo is that none of the consequences of legal marriage is automatically conferred on an opposite-sex domestic partnership. There is, however, some statutory recognition in the Compensation for Occupational Injuries and Diseases Act, and judicial recognition in the form of Volks v Robinson, which concerned a man and a woman who had lived together in a permanent life partnership. When he died, she lodged a claim for maintenance against his estate in terms of the Maintenance Act but was rejected by the executor. Having never married him, she did not fit the Act's definition of "survivor." It was requested of the court that it read-in partners in domestic partnerships or alternatively declare unconstitutional the relevant provision for its unjustifiable discrimination and its violation of the right to dignity. Handed down before the passage of the Civil Union Act, the majority judgment found that there had been no duty of support while the man had been alive, so there should be no duty for maintenance by his estate following his death.

Domestic partnerships are currently self-recognised and regulated. The partners may jointly enter into contracts of sale and lease, as well as into a universal partnership, whereby they agree to put in common all their property, universorum bonorum: not only what they have but also what they later acquire. Universal partnerships may be entered on either express or tacit terms, but both partners will be required to contribute, and the official objective is to make a profit. Alternatives to the universal partnership exist in the form of life partnership contracts and contracts of agency. It is also worth noting that a person may leave his estate to anyone in his will.

There is considerable debate over the future status of domestic partnerships in South Africa, particularly among feminists. The South African Law Reform Commission published a Discussion Paper on the subject in March 2006. The Civil Union Act requires registration and has a same-sex focus. The Domestic Partnerships Bill, providing for the legal recognition of domestic partnerships and the enforcement of their legal consequences, was tabled on 14 January 2008. Its preamble observes that, under the Constitution, everyone is equal before the law and has the right to its equal protection and benefit. The Bill still distinguishes between registered and unregistered partnerships.

===== Same-sex partnerships =====
The foremost protection of gay, lesbian and bisexual people in South Africa is section 9 of the Constitution, which forbids discrimination on the basis of sexual orientation.

====== Statutory recognition ======
Same-sex partnerships also enjoy statutory recognition in South Africa, as of 30 November 2006, under the Civil Union Act, which provides for

- the right to enter into a civil union, open to both opposite-sex and same-sex couples, which may be called either a "marriage" or a "civil partnership";
- the right of a marriage officer, employed by the state, to refuse to marry same-sex couples on grounds of "conscience, religion or belief;"
- all rights and obligations and benefits of a marriage to be afforded to civil unions.

In the landmark case of Fourie, discussed above, four main arguments were made in opposition to the recognition of same-sex partnerships:

1. the inability of same-sex partners to procreate;
2. the need to respect religion;
3. the constitutional necessity to have recourse to diverse family law systems; and
4. the recognition given by international law to heterosexual marriage.

These were all ultimately rejected, and the separate-but-equal approach strongly dismissed as historically "a threadbare cloak for covering distaste for or repudiation by those in power of the group subjected to segregation."

====== Judicial recognition ======
There is now considerable jurisprudence in recognition of the right to equality of same-sex partners. The following judgments, excluding the already-discussed Fourie, illustrate its development:

- National Coalition for Gay and Lesbian Equality v Minister of Justice dealt with a challenge to the constitutionality of the offence of sodomy, and required consideration of the common law. The court found that it amounted to a violation of the right to equality (which cannot be limited) by unfairly discriminating against gay men on basis of sexual orientation.
- In National Coalition for Gay and Lesbian Equality v Minister of Home Affairs, the Alien Controls Act was found to be unconstitutional in denying same-sex partners the same rights as heterosexual partners. Immigration rights were thus extended to the foreign partners of South African citizens in same-sex relationships.
- Satchwell v President of the Republic of South Africa involved a challenge to certain provisions in the Judge's Remuneration and Conditions of Employment Act, which were found to be unconstitutional in their denial to same-sex life partners of the benefits usually afforded to a judge's spouse.
- In Du Plessis v Road Accident Fund, a same-sex couple had lived together in a long-term relationship, having gone through a ceremony similar to marriage, and would have married had it been possible. They had the intention of reciprocal duty of support. The court held, however, that to extend to such partners the common-law action for loss of support would be an incremental step to ensure that the common law accorded with the dynamic and evolving fabric of South African society as reflected in the Constitution, recent legislation and judicial pronouncements, and therefore that the plaintiff was entitled to claim damages from the defendant for loss of that support.
- In Gory v Kolver, when Henry Brooks died intestate, his parents nominated Daniel Kolver to be the executor of his estate, this decision being made on the basis that Brooks had no spouse. Mark Gory, however, wished to inherit in terms of Intestate Succession Act. The court held that the relationship between Brooks and Gory amounted to a same-sex permanent life partnership, and that they had pursued reciprocal duties of support. The exclusion of same-sex partners from the Act was unconstitutional, and the court ordered a reading-in of words "or partner in a permanent same-sex life partnership in which the partners have undertaken reciprocal duties of support."

It is unlikely, given the provisions of Civil Union Act and its recognition of same-sex marriages, that the court will hear very many such cases in the future.

== Engagement ==
An engagement, which is an agreement sui generis, is generally defined in the common law as "a legal agreement between a man and a woman to marry each other on a specific or determinable date." Despite the constitutional developments discussed previously, this definition remains in place today.

=== Requirements ===
==== Capacity ====
- To enter into an engagement, one must generally be eighteen years of age (the age of majority) or older.
- Minors require the consent of both their parents or guardians (unless certain circumstances are in place or a court order is granted). Removal of consent results in the immediate termination of the engagement.
- Persons with mental illness cannot become engaged.

==== Consensus ====
Consensus is prevented, inter alia, by mistake, misrepresentation, metus and undue influence.

===== Mistake =====
Mistake may take two following forms:

1. Error in persona (mistake as to the person with whom consensus has been reached); and
2. Error in negotio (mistake as to nature of the juristic act).

Mistake results in the engagement's being void. There can be no claim for damages by either party.

===== Misrepresentation =====
Misrepresentation occurs where, had the innocent party known the truth, he or she would not have become engaged to the other party. The rescission of an engagement is justified where the misrepresentation is material. If it seriously jeopardises the possibility of achieving a happy and harmonious marriage, the engagement will be void. Misrepresentation will render the engagement voidable at the instance of the innocent party. Among the legitimate grounds for terminating the engagement are such personal qualities as impotence, sterility and serious mental illness.

The issue of misrepresentation by omission was raised in Schnaar v Jansen, where one of the parties to the engagement omitted to mention

- that one of her uncles had been found guilty of (and hanged for) murdering his wife;
- that another uncle was in an interracial marriage; and
- that her brother had been convicted of housebreaking and theft.

The court held, however, that as none concerned a personal quality of hers, she was under no obligation to disclose these facts to her then-fiancé. She was therefore able to claim damages for breach of promise of marriage.

An engagement may also be rescinded on the ground of innocent misrepresentation. In Thelemann v Von Geyso, Von Geyso was coaxed into a marriage on the belief, which Thelemann held also, that she was pregnant. He was successful in his defence.

===== Metus =====
Metus or duress is another grounds for terminating the engagement. It is where one make threats to other party to agree on engagement

===== Undue influence =====
Undue influence is another grounds for terminating the engagement.

==== Lawfulness ====
One must have competence to marry if one is to enter into an engagement. One cannot become engaged, for instance, while one is married to someone else. In Friedman v Harris, it was held that payment for the promise to become engaged renders the engagement void, as it is contra bonos mores, and the payer will not be entitled to return of the amount paid.

If one party was unaware, entering into the engagement, that the other was married, he or she may bring action against the other party.

==== Possibility ====
Performance of the engagement contract will be impossible if the parties are not permitted to marry. This is always the case for minors below the age of puberty and for parties who fall within prohibited degrees of relationship.

=== Consequences ===
Engagement confers the duty to marry and to be faithful. There is no duty, however, to be intimate. The date of marriage must be set within a reasonable time, and there will be a breach of promise if a party refuses to marry on the agreed-upon date. An engagement may be concluded subject to conditions, but these may not be immoral, illegal, impossible or in conflict with the nature of marriage.

=== Termination ===
Engagement is terminated most obviously on marriage, but it may also be terminated

- by the death of one of the parties;
- by mutual agreement;
- in the case of minors, by the withdrawal of parental consent; and
- by unilateral termination.

==== Unilateral termination ====
A unilateral termination must be justified; it must constitute a iusta causa, such as sterility, impotence, hereditary disease or a serious crime. Ceasing to love the other party does not constitute a iusta causa; nor, as in Schaar, does the non-disclosure of facts which do not bear on the personal qualities of the party who omitted them. A mistaken impression as to "the nature, mental worth, appearance, status or financial position of the other does not constitute a ground for terminating the engagement and is, therefore, irrelevant.". According to Innocent P.Chigume, A serious argument concerning the matrimonial property system which is to operate in the marriage would probably also be considered a justa causa.

In Krull v Sangerhaus, the court held that, to constitute a iusta causa for unilateral termination, the cause must be of a sufficiently serious nature. The allegation of a dispute between the parties' parents regarding the wedding reception, even if it also involved the parties, was "too frivolous a circumstance to warrant a repudiation."

If the unilateral termination is unjustified, it will amount to a breach of promise.

=== Breach of promise ===
The unreported case of Van Jaarsveld v Bridges 2010 (4) SA 558 (SCA) deals with the constitutional approach. The claimant should keep contractual damages separate from delictual damages. One may not claim performance for breach of promise.

==== Contractual damages ====
Contractual damages (patrimonial loss from the breach of promise) are calculated on the basis of positive interest. The courts are not consistent in this regard; each case is determined on its specific merits. The courts will, however, consider the following elements:

- the manner of the breach;
- the motives behind the breach;
- social status;
- the plaintiff's age; and
- potential for future marriage.

It is probably best to say that damages are sui generis in this area of the law.

In Guggenheim v Rosenbaum a divorced woman in New York met a man domiciled in South Africa. After accepting his proposal, it was arranged that she would come to South Africa to marry him. She gave up her flat, her car and certain of her furniture (the rest being stored), as well as her employment. On their arrival in Johannesburg, however, he refused to marry her. The court found that theirs was a valid engagement and therefore that she was entitled to both actual and prospective loss.

Sepheri v Scanlan sets out some of the factors to be considered in assessing contractual damages, among them engagement for a long period of years, constant travel and possibly community of property.

==== Delictual damages ====
Delictual damages, for the infringement of personality rights, require the plaintiff to prove

1. injury to a personality interest (actio iniuriarum); and
2. intention to injure (animus iniuriandi).

The amount of damages is left to the discretion of the court based on several factors:

- the way in which breach occurred;
- the motives behind that course of conduct;
- the social status of the parties; and
- previous life experiences.

Sepheri v Scanlan 2008 (1) SA 322 (C) involved an engagement of more than five years and the relinquishment of career prospects, but no delictual damages (for iniuria or contumelia) were awarded. In light of the contractual damages awarded, the court determined that it would be inappropriate to make an additional award in respect of conduct "which for all its emotional pyrotechnics was an inevitable consequence of ferocious litigation."

===== Seduction =====
Damages may be claimed for seduction, or extramarital sex with a virgin with her consent. The plaintiff will need to prove

1. that she was a virgin;
2. that she was seduced; and
3. that sexual intercourse resulted from that seduction.

In M v M a Hindu marriage was entered into between a minor and the defendant, a major. An agreement was reached between the defendant and the plaintiff, acting in his capacity as father and natural guardian of his minor daughter, that the marriage would subsequently be registered according to the laws of South Africa. After their Hindu marriage, the minor (a virgin), in anticipation of their civil marriage, allowed the defendant to have sex with her. The defendant subsequently repudiated his obligation to register the marriage, and the plaintiff claimed damages for seduction and breach of promise to marry.

The court found that the fact that the defendant's father and the plaintiff had negotiated the terms of the marriage in accordance with Hindu custom did not have the result that no privity of contract existed between the minor and the defendant. The Marriage Act did not prohibit the contracting of a valid espousal through the agency of another. The defendant, therefore, was bound to his undertaking to register the marriage. His failure to honour that obligation without lawful excuse constituted a breach of promise.

==== Return of engagement gifts ====
The return of engagement gifts (donationes propter nuptias) depends on two things: the type of gift and the manner in which the engagement was terminated.

===== Types of gifts =====
Three types of gift can be distinguished:

====== Sponsalitia largitas ======
Sponsalitia largitas are large or costly gifts made in anticipation of marriage. The intention is to confer a lasting benefit during the marriage on the donee. These include, for example, a dowry, a house, a car and jewellery (other than an engagement ring). There is a presumption, indeed, that valuable gifts of a lasting nature, given during the engagement, were given in contemplation of the marriage.

====== Arrhae sponsalitiae ======
Arrhae sponsalitiae are gifts which reflect the seriousness of the intention of the donor to marry the other party. These are given with the intention that they will be forfeited to the donee should the donor commit a breach of promise. The engagement ring, therefore, may be retained by the donee and need only be returned if the engagement is terminated without any fault on the donor’s part.

====== Iocalia ======
Small tokens or iocalia are unconditional gifts given as tokens of affection. These include, for example, flowers, chocolates and the smallest things. These are often perishable and are used up and therefore not returned.

===== Manner of termination =====
====== Mutual consent ======
The general rule is that all gifts, other than small tokens and those which have been alienated or lost or consumed, must be returned if the engagement is terminated by mutual consent.

====== iusta causa ======
The general rule also applies if the engagement is broken off for a reason not imputable to the fault of one of the parties; for instance, if one of them has become insane or impotent, or because both parties' conduct has become such to make marriage unlikely.

====== Breach of promise ======
If the engagement has been wrongfully terminated by one of the parties, the innocent party may recover all gifts except those of negligible value.
