= Yolanda Botha =

South African politician (d. 2014)

Member of the National Assembly
- In office 6 May 2009 – 28 December 2014

Provincial Treasurer of the Northern Cape African National Congress
- In office August 2008 – 28 December 2014
- Chairperson: John Block
- Preceded by: Tina Joemat-Pettersson
- Succeeded by: Sylvia Lucas

Personal details
- Died: 28 December 2014 Kimberley, Northern Cape; South Africa
- Citizenship: South Africa
- Party: African National Congress
- Education: University of the Western Cape

Yolanda Rachel Botha (died 28 December 2014) was a South African politician and public servant who represented the African National Congress (ANC) in the National Assembly from 2009 until her death in December 2014. She also served as Provincial Treasurer of the ANC's Northern Cape branch from June 2008 until her death.

At the time of her death, Botha – along with John Block and Alvin Botes – was facing criminal charges in connection with her relationship to a private company, Trifecta Investment Holdings. Before her election to Parliament, from 2001 to 2009, Botha was head of the Northern Cape's provincial Department of Social Development, which had granted sizeable contracts to Trifecta. In 2011, Parliament's Joint Committee on Ethics and Members' Interests had reprimanded Botha for having failed to disclose benefits that she had received from Trifecta; and, in 2013, the National Prosecuting Authority indicted her on fraud and money laundering charges, alleging that she had received illegal kickbacks from the company.

== Life and career ==
Botha matriculated in Upington in the former Cape Province in 1964. She held a bachelor's degree from the University of the Western Cape, completed in 1988.

Between 2001 and 2009, Botha was head of the Department of Social Development in the Northern Cape Provincial Government. At the same time, she was a member of the governing party, the ANC, and in August 2008, at a provincial party elective conference in Moshaweng, she was elected Provincial Treasurer of the ANC's Northern Cape branch, serving under Provincial Chairperson John Block. The following year, Botha stood as a candidate in the 2009 general election and secured election to an ANC seat in the National Assembly, the lower house of the South African Parliament. She chaired Parliament's Portfolio Committee on Social Development.

Botha was re-elected as ANC Provincial Treasurer, unopposed, in June 2012. She was also re-elected to a second term in her legislative seat in the 2014 general election, ranked fifth on the ANC's provincial-to-national party list for the Northern Cape.

== Relationship with Trifecta Holdings ==
=== Parliamentary ethics probe: 2011 ===
Soon into the legislative term, Botha was charged with misconduct in Parliament's Joint Committee on Ethics and Members' Interests. The investigation emanated from investigating reporting by the Mail & Guardian which purported to uncover that Botha had received kickbacks from Trifecta Investment Holdings, a company which had signed property leases worth more than R50-million with the Northern Cape Department of Social Development. The leases were concluded during Botha's tenure as head of department, and the Mail & Guardian alleged that Trifecta had offered Botha a 10% stake in the company and had paid to renovate her home in 2009. Botha denied that her relationship with Trifecta was corrupt or otherwise inappropriate. She said that the stake in the company had been vested in her relatives and that the home renovation was financed with a loan which she would repay to Trifecta.

In August 2011, the Joint Committee on Ethics and Members' Interests found Botha guilty of breaching the parliamentary rules for failing to disclose the benefits she had received from Trifecta. It also found her guilty of "wilfully misleading Parliament" about the scale of the loan she had received from Trifecta – she had said under oath that it was worth R500,000, when in fact the renovation costs exceeded R1.2 million. She was sentenced to the maximum penalty: a reprimand and a fine of 30 days' salary.

=== Criminal charges: 2013–2014 ===
In 2013, Botha was indicted on criminal charges in connection with kickbacks allegedly received from Trifecta. Her co-accused included two other Northern Cape politicians, John Block and Alvin Botes, as well as other Northern Cape officials. The National Prosecuting Authority alleged that Botha, Block, and Botes had been given kickbacks in exchange for encouraging the provincial government to sign leases with Trifecta at grossly inflated rates. All pled not guilty on charges of fraud, corruption, and money laundering. The trial was ongoing when Botha died in December 2014, but Block was later found guilty of corruption and money laundering, as was Trifecta's former chief executive, Christo Scholtz; Botes was acquitted.

== Death and estate ==
In November 2014, Botha's doctor told the Northern Cape High Court that she was terminally ill. She was diagnosed with metastatic melanoma, which spread to her brain, and she died on 28 December 2014 in a hospital in Kimberley.

After Botha's death, her family entered into a prolonged dispute with the state over the proceeds of her estate, which the National Prosecuting Authority argued constituted proceeds of unlawful activities in terms of the Prevention of Organised Crime Act. In 2016, the Northern Cape High Court ordered that Botha's family should forfeit both her home and the Trifecta shares she had been given. After a series of appeals, the dispute was heard in the Constitutional Court, which in March 2020 decided in favour of the state, ruling that the estate should forfeit the full value of the Trifecta-funded renovations.
