= Kevin Swain =

South African judge

Judge of the Supreme Court of Appeal
- In office 1 June 2014 – 21 December 2020
- Appointed by: Jacob Zuma

Judge of the Supreme Court
- In office 1 November 2003 – 31 May 2014
- Appointed by: Thabo Mbeki
- Division: KwaZulu-Natal

Personal details
- Born: Kevin Gerard Beecroft Swain; 20 December 1950 (age 75) Pietermaritzburg, Natal; Union of South Africa
- Spouse: Anne Swain
- Education: Merchiston Preparatory School; Maritzburg College
- Alma mater: University of Natal; University of Cambridge

Kevin Gerard Beecroft Swain (born 20 December 1950) is a South African retired judge who served in the Supreme Court of Appeal from 2014 to 2020. He was formerly a judge of the KwaZulu-Natal High Court from 2003 to 2014. Before joining the bench in November 2003, he was an advocate and Senior Counsel in Pietermaritzburg.

== Early life and education ==
Swain was born on 20 December 1950 in Pietermaritzburg in the former Natal Province. He attended Merchiston Preparatory School and Maritzburg College, matriculating in 1967.

Thereafter he studied at the University of Natal's Pietermaritzburg campus, where he completed a BSc in 1972 and an LLB cum laude in 1975, and at the University of Cambridge, where he completed a second LLB in 1977. His study at Cambridge was funded by a bursary from the Attorneys, Notaries and Conveyancers Fidelity Fund.

== Legal career ==
Swain was admitted as an advocate in 1975, shortly after his graduation from the University of Natal. When he returned to South Africa from Cambridge in 1977, he commenced his practice at the Pietermaritzburg Bar, where he worked for the next 26 years and where he took silk in 1993. During the post-apartheid period, his clients included the African National Congress, which he represented in litigation on floor-crossing.

During his time at the Bar, Swain was a part-time lecturer at the University of Natal from 1978 to 1980, teaching public international law and law of evidence, and he was later the vice-chairman of the Pietermaritzburg Bar for two terms from 1995 to 1997 and from 1999 to 2001. In addition, he was an acting judge in the KwaZulu-Natal High Court on several occasions between 1998 and 2003.

== KwaZulu-Natal High Court: 2003–2014 ==
On 1 November 2003, Swain joined the bench permanently as a judge of the KwaZulu-Natal High Court. He served in that court for over a decade, although he served a protracted stint as an acting judge in the Supreme Court of Appeal from October 2012 to May 2014; during the same period, he was also periodically an acting judge in the Competition Appeal Court.

== Supreme Court of Appeal: 2014–2020 ==
In April 2014, Swain was among seven candidates whom the Judicial Service Commission shortlisted and interviewed for possible permanent elevation to the Supreme Court of Appeal. Then serving as an acting judge of appeal, he was viewed as a frontrunner: Judge President Lex Mpati was complimentary during his interview, and the Business Day described his candidacy as "apparently universally supported". After the interviews, the commission recommended Swain, Boissie Mbha, and Dumisani Zondi for appointment, and President Jacob Zuma accepted the recommendation the following month, appointing the trio to the Supreme Court of Appeal with effect from 1 June 2014. Swain served in the appellate court until his retirement in 2020.

== Personal life ==
He is married to Anne Swain; they have two children.
