= Steven Majiedt =

South African judge (born 1960)

The Honourable Steven Majiedt

Judge of the Constitutional Court
- Incumbent
- Assumed office 1 October 2019
- President: Cyril Ramaphosa

Judge of the Supreme Court of Appeal
- Incumbent
- Assumed office 2019
- President: Jacob Zuma

Judge of the High Court
- In office 2010–2019
- President: Thabo Mbeki
- Division: Northern Cape

Personal details
- Born: Steven Arnold Majiedt; 18 December 1960 (age 65) Kenhardt, Cape Province; Union of South Africa
- Spouse: Rowena Majiedt
- Education: University of the Western Cape

Steven Arnold Majiedt (born 18 December 1960) is a South African judge of the Constitutional Court of South Africa. He joined the Constitutional Court in October 2019 as an appointee of President Cyril Ramaphosa. Formerly a practicing advocate, he served in the Supreme Court of Appeal from 2010 to 2019 and in the Northern Cape High Court from 2000 to 2010.

Born in the Northern Cape, Majiedt attended the University of the Western Cape and practiced law in Cape Town between 1984 and 1995. He gained his legal reputation serving as junior counsel on public law matters concerning apartheid legislation. After the end of apartheid, he was Provincial State Law Adviser to Premier Manne Dipico's government in the Northern Cape between 1996 and 2000 and then practiced briefly in chambers in Kimberley before he was appointed to the High Court of South Africa later in 2000.

During his nine years' service on the Supreme Court of Appeal, Majiedt acted in the Constitutional Court in 2014 and was nominated unsuccessfully for permanent elevation in 2017. After a subsequent round of interviews in April 2019, Majiedt was appointed to the Constitutional Court alongside Zukisa Tshiqi; the pair became Ramaphosa's first appointments to the highest court and replaced retired Justices Bess Nkabinde and Dikgang Moseneke.

== Early life and education ==
Majiedt was born on 18 December 1960 in the small town of Kenhardt in the former Cape Province. His family were descended from a mixed Khoisan–Javanese lineage, and he was designated as Coloured under apartheid. Both of his parents were teachers and, when he was eight years old, his family moved to Barkly West, where his father became a school principal. He matriculated at William Pescod High School in Kimberley in 1978 and went on to the University of the Western Cape, where he completed a BA in law in 1981 and an LLB in 1983.

== Legal career ==
Upon his graduation, Majiedt hoped to return to Kimberley to practice as an attorney, but he was unable to secure a position there to complete his articles of clerkship. Instead, he remained in Cape Town, where he joined the Cape Bar as an advocate in 1984. His chambers were on the fifth floor of Huguenot Chambers, which was well known for its concentration of advocates aligned to anti-apartheid organisations such as the African National Congress and United Democratic Front. Majiedt himself was a founding member of the progressive National Association of Democratic Lawyers and much of his practice concerned advocacy in matters concerning apartheid legislation.

Other lawyers who had chambers on Huguenot Chamber's fifth floor included Siraj Desai, Johnny de Lange, and Dullah Omar. Majiedt later said that he considered Omar a mentor and that Omar advised him in 1984 to remain in South Africa, on political grounds, rather than accept a Fulbright Scholarship to complete an LLM at Stanford Law School; for family reasons, Majiedt also declined an offer to complete an LLM at Northwestern University School of Law in 1987. As junior counsel, Majiedt assisted prominent senior counsel including Thembile Skweyiya, Dikgang Moseneke, Bernard Ngoepe, and Pius Langa; Langa, who went on to serve as Chief Justice of South Africa, became Majiedt's judicial idol.

Majiedt practiced at the Cape Bar until 1995. The following year, under the first post-apartheid administration, he was appointed as Chief Provincial State Law Adviser in the newly incorporated Northern Cape Province, where he served under Premier Manne Dipico. He left that position in January 2000 and the following month joined the Northern Cape Bar in Kimberley, where he took up a number of government briefs.

== Northern Cape High Court: 2000–2010 ==
On 1 May 2000, Majiedt joined the bench, appointed by President Thabo Mbeki as a judge of the Northern Cape Division of the High Court of South Africa. He served in the High Court for a decade. During that time, in 2004, he served with the Indian Solicitor-General, Goolam Vahanvati, on a two-man panel appointed by the International Cricket Council to investigate Heath Streak's allegations of racism in the Zimbabwe Cricket Union.

Between 2006 and 2008, Majiedt was involved in a dispute with Judge President Frans Kgomo, the head of the Northern Cape High Court. The dispute apparently began in 2006 with a row over Kgomo's decision to advise Justice Minister Brigitte Mabandla to appoint Judge Pule Tlaletsi as acting Judge President while Kgomo was on leave – a recommendation that was unpopular with other judges in the division because of Tlaletsi's lack of seniority. Commentators linked the discord to racial tensions, with senior white and Coloured judges apparently unhappy that Tlaletsi's race, as a black African, overrode their seniority. According to Kgomo, Majiedt sent Kgomo a text message in which he accused Kgomo of being a "sly, devious conniving person, but also a coward", motivated by "sheer racism and malice". When Kgomo reported Majiedt to the Judicial Service Commission on this basis, Majiedt filed a counter-complaint of discrimination, racism, and nepotism against Kgomo. The dispute continued until October 2008, when the Judicial Service Commission announced that, although Majiedt had been reprimanded for using "insulting and inappropriate language" in his text message, the dispute had been resolved without any formal misconduct findings against either party.

== Supreme Court of Appeal: 2010–2019 ==
On 3 November 2010, President Jacob Zuma announced Majiedt's elevation to the Supreme Court of Appeal, where he joined the bench on 1 December 2010. In 2015, he was part of the Supreme Court coram that overturned the High Court's culpable homicide conviction in State v Oscar Pistorius, finding Paralympian Oscar Pistorius guilty of murdering Reeva Steenkamp.

=== Constitutional Court judgements ===
From January to May 2014, Majiedt and Nambitha Dambuza were acting justices in the Constitutional Court of South Africa, appointed by President Zuma to stand in during the leave of Justices Mogoeng Mogoeng and Bess Nkabinde. During his brief secondment to the Constitutional Court, Majiedt heard 11 cases and wrote several judgements. These included majority judgements in Cool Ideas v Hubbard, on arbitration, statutory interpretation, and the Housing Consumers Protection Measures Act; and in Malan v City of Cape Town, on the validity of an eviction order.

Most significant, however, was the court's unanimous judgement in National Commissioner of the South African Police Service v Southern African Human Rights Litigation Centre, in which Majiedt wrote on behalf of the court that, under the Rome Statute of the International Criminal Court, the South African Police Service was obliged to investigate credible allegations that the Zimbabwean police had tortured political activists inside neighbouring Zimbabwe. The judgement was Majiedt's first encounter with international law, and it became a landmark in South African jurisprudence on international criminal law, affirming the principle of universal jurisdiction over crimes against humanity.

=== Judicial Service Commission interviews ===
In April 2017, Majiedt and four other candidates – Leona Theron, Malcolm Wallis, Boissie Mbha, and Jody Kollapen – were shortlisted and interviewed for possible permanent appointment to a seat on the Constitutional Court, which had been vacated by the retirement of Justice Johann van der Westhuizen. The Mail & Guardian described Majiedt as "one of the favourite candidates of the legal community"; he was the second-most senior candidate, behind Theron, and either he or Theron, if appointed, would have become the country's first Coloured justice. However, during his interview with the Judicial Service Commission, Majiedt said that he preferred to identify as black rather than as Coloured. He was also asked about racial divisions among judges in the Supreme Court and about his feud with Frans Kgomo, who was a member of the commission; on the latter point, Majiedt said that he and Kgomo had become friends and that he had learned from the altercation "that one should control one's temper". The Judicial Service Commission identified Majiedt and three of the other candidates as suitable for appointment, but President Zuma elected to appoint Theron to the vacancy.

Two years later, in April 2019, Majiedt was again shortlisted for Constitutional Court appointment, this time as one of six candidates vying to replace retired Justices Bess Nkabinde and Dikgang Moseneke. After holding interviews, the Judicial Service Commission recommended Majiedt and four others as suitable for appointment. He and Zukisa Tshiqi were viewed as the front-runners.

== Constitutional Court: 2019–present ==
Following the Judicial Service Commission interviews of April 2019, President Cyril Ramaphosa announced on 11 September that Majiedt and Tshiqi would be appointed to the Constitutional Court; they were Ramaphosa's first appointments to the highest court and joined the bench on 1 October 2019. Since then, notable judgements penned by Majiedt include the court's unanimous judgements in Qwelane v South African Human Rights Commission, a hate speech matter which established the unconstitutionality of Section 10(1)(a) of the Equality Act, and in Mineral Sands Resources v Reddell, which asserted for the first time the validity of the SLAPP suit defence under South African common law.

== Personal life ==
Majiedt is married to Rowena Mandy Majiedt, who is a businesswoman and former teacher; they have one daughter. Majiedt has been the Chancellor of Kimberley's Sol Plaatje University since April 2016, having gained appointment to his second successive five-year term in October 2020, and he was formerly the chairperson of the council of the William Humphreys Art Gallery in Kimberley.
