= Daniels v Campbell =

South African legal case

- Court: Constitutional Court of South Africa
- Full case name: Daniels v Campbell NO and Others
- Decided: 11 March 2004
- Docket nos.: CCT 40/ 03
- Citations: [2004] ZACC 14; 2004 (5) SA 331 (CC); 2004 (7) BCLR 735 (CC)

Case history
- Prior actions: Daniels v Campbell NO and Others 2003 (9) BCLR 969 (C) in the High Court of South Africa, Cape of Good Hope Provincial Division
- Related actions: Daniels v Campbell NO and Others [2003] ZAWCHC 41 in the High Court, Cape of Good Hope Provincial Division

Court membership
- Judges sitting: Chaskalson CJ, Langa DCJ, Ackermann J, Madala J, Mokgoro J, Moseneke J, Ngcobo J, O’Regan J, Sachs J and Yacoob J

Case opinions
- The word "spouse" as used in the Intestate Succession Act, 1987 includes the surviving partner to a monogamous Muslim marriage, as does the word "survivor" as used in the Maintenance of Surviving Spouses Act, 1990.
- Decision by: Sachs J (Chaskalson, Langa, Ackermann, Mokgoro, Ngcobo, O’Regan and Yacoob concurring)
- Concurrence: Ngcobo J (Chaskalson, Langa, Ackermann, Mokgoro, O’Regan, Sachs and Yacoob concurring)
- Dissent: Moseneke J (Madala concurring)

Daniels v Campbell NO and Others, an important case in South African family law and law of succession, was heard in the Constitutional Court on 6 November 2003 and decided on 11 March 2004. The court was unanimous that the constitutional right to equality requires that rights of intestate inheritance and maintenance must be extended to the surviving partners of de facto monogamous Muslim marriages, even though such marriages are not recognised under the Marriage Act, 1961.

In dual opinions written by Justices Albie Sachs and Sandile Ngcobo, a majority of the court held that the Intestate Succession Act, 1987 and Maintenance of Surviving Spouses Act, 1990 must be read to extend such rights. A minority, comprising Justices Dikgang Moseneke and Tholie Madala, disagreed with this approach, arguing that the legislation refers to lawful marriages under the Marriage Act and that the legislation is therefore unconstitutional in its current form.

The ambit of this judgment was restricted to de facto monogamous Muslim marriages; it was extended to polygamous Muslim marriages in Hassam v Jacobs.

== Background ==
Juleiga Daniels's husband died intestate in 1994; the main item in the deceased's estate was the couple's home in Cape Town. Because the couple had been married by Muslim rites, without solemnisation under the Marriage Act, 1961, the Master of the High Court found that Daniels could not inherit the deceased's estate or receive maintenance from it; such a marriage did not qualify her as a "surviving spouse" in terms of the Intestate Succession Act, 1987 and Maintenance of Surviving Spouses Act, 1990.

== High Court action ==
Daniels approached the High Court of South Africa for an order declaring that she was the spouse and survivor of the deceased, or, alternatively, for an order declaring that the Intestate Succession Act and Maintenance of Surviving Spouses Act were unconstitutional to the extent that they discriminated unfairly against Muslim marriages.

On 24 June 2003, Judge Belinda van Heerden of the Cape Provincial Division found that Daniels was not a spouse or survivor for the purposes of the Acts, because her marriage to the deceased was not a valid marriage in South African law. Courts did not recognise Muslim marriages both because they were potentially polygamous and because they were not solemnised under the Marriage Act. However, van Heerden also found that this situation was inconsistent with the Constitution and in particular with Muslim spouses' constitutional right to equality. She therefore granted the alternative relief sought by Daniels and instructed that, until such time as the legislature recognised the Muslim personal law of succession in a manner consistent with the Constitution, certain provisions should be read into the Acts to ensure that their protections extended to "a husband or wife married in accordance with Muslim rites in a de facto monogamous union".

The High Court's order was referred to the Constitutional Court of South Africa for confirmation of the declaration of constitutional invalidity. Anxious that the Constitutional Court would not confirm the order, Daniels also applied in the High Court for leave to appeal should the application for confirmation fail; this application, though unnecessary, led to a second judgment in the Cape High Court, in which Acting Judge Ashley Binns-Ward granted her conditional leave to appeal.

== Judgments ==
=== Majority judgments ===
In the Constitutional Court, Justice Albie Sachs held that the word "spouse," in its ordinary meaning, should include parties to a Muslim marriage, because this corresponds to the way the word is generally understood and used, and because it would be far more awkward from a linguistic point of view to exclude Muslim partners than to include them. The historic exclusion in South Africa flowed not from the courts' giving the word its ordinary meaning but from a linguistically-strained usage and from cultural and racial prejudices. Both the intent and the impact of the restrictive interpretation were discriminatory. On this view, it was not necessary to "read in" additional phrases to the legislation, but only to read the relevant provisions according to their natural meaning, on which they were not offensive to the right to equality. The Constitutional Court therefore handed down a declaratory order instructing that the surviving partners to monogamous Muslim marriages qualified as "spouses" for the purposes of the Intestate Succession Act and "survivors" for the purposes of the Maintenance of Surviving Spouses Act. The court intentionally did not deal with the question of polygamous Muslim marriages.

Eight of the justices agreed with this order and with Sachs's opinion. The same group joined in a separate concurring judgment filed by Justice Sandile Ngcobo, which elaborated on how the same conclusion could be reached by means of section 39(2) of the Constitution.

=== Minority judgment ===
Justice Dikgang Moseneke filed a dissent, in which Justice Tholie Madala joined; the minority held that the majority's reading of the Acts was "unduly strained", because – as demonstrated in the court's own precedent – the word "spouse" bore no ordinary meaning other than a partner in a legally enforceable marriage, and therefore in a marriage recognised under the Marriage Act. Thus the minority favoured the High Court's approach: because Muslim spouses were excluded from the protections of the Intestate Succession Act and Maintenance of Surviving Spouses Act and because that exclusion was unjustifiably discriminatory, it would uphold the declaration of constitutional invalidity and read in an alternative phrasing. Moseneke added that it would be less offensive to the separation of powers for this unjust exclusion to be addressed through legislative intervention rather than through the "interpretative intervention" launched by the majority.

== See also ==
- Amod v MMVF
- Ismail v Ismail
- Kahn v Kahn
- Women's Legal Centre Trust v President of the Republic of South Africa (2022)
