= Pule Tlaletsi =

South African judge

The Honourable Pule Tlaletsi

Judge President of the Northern Cape High Court
- Incumbent
- Assumed office 18 September 2017
- Appointed by: Jacob Zuma
- Deputy: Violet Phatshoane
- Preceded by: Frans Diale Kgomo

Judge of the High Court
- Incumbent
- Assumed office 1 November 2003
- Appointed by: Thabo Mbeki
- Division: Northern Cape

Personal details
- Born: Lazarus Pule Tlaletsi; 5 November 1960 (age 65) Randfontein, Transvaal; Union of South Africa
- Spouse: Maletsha Tlaletsi
- Education: University of Bophuthatswana

Lazarus Pule Tlaletsi (born 5 November 1960) is a South African judge who is currently serving as Judge President of the Northern Cape High Court since September 2017. He was formerly the Deputy Judge President of the Labour Court and Labour Appeal Court from 2013 to 2017. He joined the bench in November 2004 as a puisne judge of the Northern Cape High Court. Before that, he was a practising attorney in the North West Province.

== Early life and education ==
Tlaletsi was born on 5 November 1960 in Randfontein in the former Transvaal Province. He matriculated in 1980 at Moroka High School and went on to the University of Bophuthatswana, where he completed a BProc in 1985 and an LLB in 1987.

== Legal career ==
After his graduation, Tlaletsi was a candidate attorney at the office of the State Attorney until 1989, when he was admitted to the bar as an attorney. Thereafter he practised as an attorney in Mafikeng and Zeerust, becoming director of his own firm, Gura Tlaletsi Inc.

During that time, he was a member of Lawyers for Human Rights from 1989 to 1996, a member of the National Association of Democratic Lawyers from 1990 onwards, and the president of the Law Society of Bophuthatswana from 2002 to 2003. In the realm of public service, he was a member of the council of his alma mater (renamed as the University of the North West) from 1995 to 1999, a councillor in Mafikeng Local Municipality from 1995 to 2000, and an acting judge in the Northern Cape Division of the High Court of South Africa from April 2003.

== Northern Cape High Court: 2003–present ==
On 1 November 2003, Tlaletsi joined the bench permanently as a judge of the Northern Cape Division.

=== Labour Courts ===
Tlaletsi was an acting judge in the Labour Court on several occasions between 2004 and 2007, and an acting judge in the Labour Appeal Court on several occasions between 2007 and 2010. In May 2010, President Jacob Zuma announced his confirmation as a permanent judge of the Labour Appeal Court.

Just over three years later, in August 2013, the Judicial Service Commission announced that he was the sole nominee to fill the position of Deputy Judge President of the Labour Courts. On the recommendation of the Judicial Service Commission, Zuma confirmed his appointment to the deputy judge presidency with effect from 2 December 2013. In that capacity, Tlaletsi was acting Judge President of the Labour Courts in 2016.

=== Judge presidency ===
On two occasions, once in 2006 and once in 2014, Tlaletsi also stood in for Frans Kgomo as acting Judge President of the Northern Cape Division. On the first occasion, his elevation over other, more senior judges became a matter of controversy, leading to a prolonged dispute at the Judicial Service Commission in it transpired that Judge Steven Majiedt had attacked Kgomo for participating, by becoming acting Judge President, in Kgomo's "devious, conniving, racist and nepotistic scheme".

In April 2017, Tlaletsi was one of two candidates shortlisted to succeed Kgomo as Judge President of the Northern Cape Division, but the other candidate, Judge Cecile Williams, withdrew from the contest shortly before the Judicial Service Commission's hearings were held. During the hearings, Tlaletsi was criticised for having taken over a year to deliver certain judgments in the Labour Appeal Court. Nonetheless, the commission recommended him for appointment, and President Zuma confirmed his appointment as Judge President with effect from 18 September 2017.

=== Constitutional Court ===
While serving as Judge President, Tlaletsi was an acting judge in the Constitutional Court of South Africa between 2021 and 2022. In that capacity, he wrote on behalf of the Constitutional Court's majority in AK v Minister of Police, Women's Legal Centre Trust v President, and Voice of the Unborn Baby v Minister of Home Affairs.

== Personal life ==
He is married to Maletsha Tlaletsi; they have two sons.
