= S v Van Aardt =

South African legal case

The appellant in Van Aardt v S, an important case in South African criminal law, had been convicted in the Grahamstown High Court of the murder of a fifteen-year-old youth, following a savage beating administered by the appellant, who suspected the deceased of theft. An appeal to the full bench of the Eastern Cape High Court was unsuccessful, so the matter came on further appeal before the Supreme Court of Appeal. The appellant admitted common assault, but denied that such assault had caused the death of the deceased, or that he bore a legal duty to seek medical intervention for the deceased.

Having examined the evidence, and having concluded that the appellant's acts caused the deceased's death, the court assessed whether or not the appellant had acted intentionally. In doing so, it had regard to the test for dolus eventualis, as authoritatively formulated by Holmes JA in S v Sigwahla. Subjective foresight is established by a process of inferential reasoning.

Acting Judge of Appeal Frans Kgomo, writing for a unanimous court, approved the following dictum from S v Van Wyk:

All the relevant facts which bear on the accused's state of mind and intention must be cumulatively assessed and a conclusion reached as to whether an inference beyond reasonable doubt can be drawn from these facts that the accused actually considered it a reasonable possibility that the deceased could die from the assault but, reckless as to such fatal possibility, embarked on or persisted with the assault.

On the medical evidence the injuries which caused death were the blows to the head. It is not possible to link up particular fist blows or kicks with particular injuries, nor is the trier of fact required to do so. Once it is established that accused No 1 killed the deceased, and it has rightly been so found by the Court a quo, the trier of fact can look at the assault as a whole in order to determine what accused No 1's intention was.

In a case such as the present the trier of fact is not required to enquire into the subjective state of mind of the accused as he inflicted each injury. Neither principle nor common sense requires this.

Having regard to the "sustained" and "vicious" assault upon the deceased by the appellant, the court found that "the appellant subjectively foresaw the possibility of his conduct causing the death of the deceased and was plainly reckless as to such result ensuing," and that he was therefore guilty of murder on the basis of dolus eventualis. This finding rendered the question of whether or not the appellant owed a duty to the deceased of obtaining medical assistance for him (the basis for the conviction in the trial court and subsequent appeal) unnecessary.

In the court a quo, the court was referred to a number of cases concerning the issue of whether the possibility which an accused foresees must be strong or slight, but the court did not find it necessary to discuss this issue. Pickering J had proceeded then to accept "for present purposes that the State was required to prove that the appellant subjectively foresaw the reasonable possibility that his failure to obtain medical assistance for the deceased would lead to the death of the deceased."

"This," argues Shannon Hoctor, "is the correct approach, in that in the face of any possible interpretive confusion the interpretation most favourable to the accused should be adopted."

The SCA, despite citing Van Wyk with approval, with regard to evidential matters, did not adopt the view set forth in that case that only foresight of a reasonable possibility of the harm occurring could constitute dolus eventualis. Hoctor submits that this approach is correct, and that the foresight component of dolus eventualis should not be subjected to any such qualification.

== See also ==
- South African criminal law
