= Boissie Mbha =

South African judge

Judge of the Supreme Court of Appeal
- In office 1 June 2014 – 1 August 2022
- President: Jacob Zuma

Judge of the High Court
- In office 1 October 2004 – 31 May 2014
- President: Thabo Mbeki
- Division: South Gauteng

Personal details
- Born: Boissie Henry Mbha; 31 July 1952 (age 73) Johannesburg, Transvaal; Union of South Africa
- Spouse: Nikiwe Mbha
- Education: Morris Isaacson High School
- Alma mater: University of Fort Hare (BJuris); Witwatersrand University (LLB); University of Johannesburg (LLM)

Boissie Henry Mbha (born 31 July 1952) is a retired South African judge who served in the Supreme Court of Appeal from June 2014 to August 2022. He was also the chairperson of the Electoral Court from 2018 to 2022, and he acted in the Constitutional Court for a term in 2016. A former attorney, he was appointed to the bench in October 2004 as a judge of the High Court's Gauteng Division.

== Early life and education ==
Mbha was born on 31 July 1952 in Johannesburg. He matriculated at the Morris Isaacson High School in Soweto, a township outside Johannesburg, and went on to the University of Fort Hare, where he completed a BJuris in 1981. Thereafter he attended the University of the Witwatersrand, graduating in 1985 with an LLB.

In subsequent decades, while practicing as a lawyer, Mbha pursued postgraduate education at the University of Johannesburg, where he completed a diploma in labour law in 1996, a diploma in tax practice in 1999, and an LLM in tax in 2010.

== Legal career ==
After completing his LLB and articles of clerkship, Mbha was admitted as an attorney of the Supreme Court of South Africa in 1987. He worked at a law firm as a professional assistant for several years before, in 1990, he established his own firm named BH Mbha Attorneys.

In October 2003, he was appointed as an acting judge in the Gauteng Division of the High Court of South Africa; during the same period, he was a military judge for the South African National Defence Force reserve.

== Gauteng High Court: 2004–2014 ==
In July 2004, while Mbha was still an acting judge, President Thabo Mbeki announced that he would be permanently appointed to the bench of the Johannesburg High Court. He took office in October 2004 at the conclusion of his acting stint.

During his decade in the High Court, Mbha was the alternate chairperson of the Court of Military Appeals from 2007 to 2014. He also served as an acting judge in the Supreme Court of Appeal between October 2012 and May 2013.

== Supreme Court of Appeal: 2014–2022 ==
In April 2014, Mbha was among seven candidates whom the Judicial Service Commission shortlisted for possible permanent elevation to the Supreme Court of Appeal. Mbha was viewed as one of the frontrunners and his interview with the commission proceeded smoothly. After the interviews, the commission recommended Mbha, Kevin Swain, and Dumisani Zondi for appointment, and President Jacob Zuma accepted the recommendation the following month, appointing Mbha to the Supreme Court of Appeal with effect from 1 June 2014. According to the Mail & Guardian, he was regarded as "a respectable all-rounder" in the court.

=== Constitutional Court ===
From 1 August to 15 December 2016, Mbha was seconded as an acting judge to the Constitutional Court of South Africa, appointed by President Zuma to fill the seat of Justice Bess Nkabinde. During that period, Mbha wrote the court's majority judgement in City of Cape Town v Aurecon and in Laubscher N.O. v Duplan. The latter, a judgement on intestate succession in permanent same-sex partnerships between unmarried persons, was criticised, including by Pierre de Vos, as promulgating a narrow view of same-sex marriage and for referring to same-sex civil unions as "marriage" in quotation marks.

Shortly after leaving the Constitutional Court, in March 2017, Mbha was one of five candidates who was shortlisted and interviewed for possible appointment to the Constitutional Court seat vacated by retired Justice Johann van der Westhuizen. During his interview with the Judicial Service Commission, he was asked about alleged racial tensions among judges at the Supreme Court and was subjected to "difficult" questioning about the separation of powers, during which he argued that judges should not comment on "general social issues" in extrajudicial public forums. After the interviews, Mbha was the only one of the five candidates whom the Judicial Service Commission did not recommend to the president as suitable for elevation to the Constitutional Court; Leona Theron was ultimately appointed to fill the vacancy.

=== Electoral Court ===
In August 2018, the Judicial Service Commission announced that Mbha was the sole nominee to serve as chairperson of South Africa's Electoral Court. Following an interview with the Judicial Service Commission, he was appointed to the position, which he held through the 2019 general election.

== Retirement ==
Mbha retired from the Supreme Court and Electoral Court in August 2022. Later the same month, he served as a member of the high-level observer mission, commissioned by the Africa Judges and Jurists Forum and chaired by Chande Othman, which travelled to the Kenyan Supreme Court in Nairobi, Kenya to observe controversial litigation on the 2022 Kenyan presidential election.

== Personal life ==
Described by Supreme Court President Lex Mpati as "sort of a fitness fanatic", Mbha has run the Comrades Marathon six times and has a black belt in karate. As an undergraduate in 1975, he was president of the University of Fort Hare's All Sports Council, and he later served as African vice-president of the World Boxing Association from 1995 to 1998, as South Africa's representative to the International Boxing Organisation from 2002 to 2003, and as an executive member and legal adviser of the South African National Boxing Control Commission.

He is also a member and chancellor of the Ethiopian Episcopal Church, and in 2016 he received the Dignitas Award granted to high-performing alumni of the University of Johannesburg. He is married to Nikiwe Mbha, with whom he has three children.
