= Women's Legal Centre Trust v President (2022) =

South African legal case

- Court: Constitutional Court of South Africa
- Full case name: Women's Legal Centre Trust v President of the Republic of South Africa and Others
- Decided: 28 June 2022
- Docket nos.: CCT 24/21
- Citations: [2022] ZACC 23; 2022 (5) SA 323 (CC); 2023 (1) BCLR 80 (CC)

Case history
- Prior actions: President of the Republic of South Africa and Another v Women's Legal Centre Trust and Others; Minister of Justice and Constitutional Development v Faro and Others; Minister of Justice and Constitutional Development v Esau and Others [2020] ZASCA 177 in the Supreme Court of Appeal; Women's Legal Centre Trust v President of the Republic of South Africa and Others; Faro v Bignham N.O. and Others; Esau v Esau and Others [2018] ZAWCHC 109 in the High Court of South Africa, Western Cape Division
- Related action: Women's Legal Centre Trust v President of the Republic of South Africa and Others [2009] ZACC 20

Court membership
- Judges sitting: Madlanga J, Majiedt J, Mhlantla J, Theron J, Tshiqi J, Madondo AJ, Pillay AJ and Tlaletsi AJ

Case opinions
- Decision by: Tlaletsi AJ (unanimous)

Women's Legal Centre Trust v President of the Republic of South Africa and Others is a 2022 decision of the Constitutional Court of South Africa concerning the legal status and regulation of Muslim marriages. The Constitutional Court declared that the Marriage Act, 1961 and Divorce Act, 1979 were unconstitutional insofar as they failed to recognise and regulate marriages solemnised in accordance with sharia and not registered as civil marriages. This failure was inconsistent with various constitutional rights in sections 9, 10, 28 and 34 of the Constitution of South Africa. The judgment was unanimous and was written by Acting Justice Pule Tlaletsi.

The case originated in the Western Cape High Court, where it was decided by Judge Nolwazi Mabindla-Boqwana.

== See also ==
- South African family law
- Constitutional litigation in South Africa
- Section Nine of the Constitution of South Africa
