= Cool Ideas v Hubbard =

South African legal case

- Court: Constitutional Court of South Africa
- Full case name: Cool Ideas 1186 CC v Anne Christine Hubbard and Another
- Decided: 5 June 2014
- Docket nos.: CCT 99/13
- Citations: [2014] ZACC 16; 2014 (4) SA 474 (CC); 2014 (8) BCLR 869 (CC)

Case history
- Appealed from: Supreme Court of Appeal – Hubbard v Cool Ideas [2013] ZASCA 71

Court membership
- Judges sitting: Moseneke ACJ; Skweyiya ADCJ; Cameron; Froneman; Jafta; Khampepe; Madlanga; Van der Westhuizen; Zondo; Dambuza AJ; Majiedt AJ

Case opinions
- Decision by: Majiedt AJ (Moseneke, Skweyiya, Khampepe and Madlanga concurring)
- Concurrence: Jafta J (Zondo concurring)
- Dissent: Froneman J (Cameron, Dambuza and Van der Westhuizen concurring)

Cool Ideas 1186 CC v Hubbard and Another is a decision in South African contract law, decided by the Constitutional Court of South Africa on 5 June 2014. The court interpreted the statutory registration requirements for home builders contained in section 10(1) of the Housing Consumers Protection Measures Act. More generally, it held that courts could not enforce arbitration agreements that would have the effect of enforcing contractual transactions that do not comply with statutory requirements like those contained in section 10(1).

Written by Steven Majiedt, then an acting justice in the court, the judgment is regarded as an important but controversial judgment in the so-called constitutionalisation of South African contract law.

== Background ==
The dispute centered on a building contract entered in 2006 by Anne Hubbard and Cool Ideas, a property development company registered as a close corporation; Cool Ideas undertook to construct a residence for Hubbard for consideration of R2 695 600. After construction was substantially complete in October 2008, Hubbard objected to the quality of the building work and invoked the arbitration clause in the building contract to seek contractual damages from Cool Ideas. Cool Ideas counterclaimed for the outstanding payment due from Hubbard on the contract, about R550 000. The parties agreed to final and binding arbitration in February 2010, and the arbitrator found in Cool Ideas's favour in April 2010, ordering Hubbard to pay the outstanding contract sum.

Hubbard failed to satisfy the arbitration award, contending that Cool Ideas was not entitled to claim remuneration under any building contract. Her argument arose from section 10(1) of the Housing Consumers Protection Measures Act, which prohibited any person from receiving "any consideration in terms of any agreement with a housing consumer in respect of the sale or construction of a home, unless that person is a registered home builder." Cool Ideas had not been a registered home builder under the Act and instead had subcontracted the execution of the building work to a third-party registered home builder, Velvori Construction. It argued that, in such a subcontracting situation, a general contractor was not bound by section 10(1).

On an application from Cool Ideas, the Johannesburg High Court ordered Hubbard to comply with the arbitration award. The Supreme Court of Appeal upheld Hubbard's appeal, agreeing with Hubbard that the transaction had to comply with section 10(1) of the Housing Protection Act and that the arbitration award was therefore invalid and unenforceable insofar as it had the effect of enforcing an illegal transaction. The Constitutional Court heard argument on 5 February 2014 and handed down its decision on 5 June 2014.

== Majority judgment ==
Acting Justice Steven Majiedt wrote the court's majority judgment, joined by Acting Chief Justice Dikgang Moseneke, Acting Deputy Chief Justice Thembile Skweyiya, and Justices Sisi Khampepe and Mbuyiseli Madlanga. The majority upheld the Supreme Court of Appeal's decision, dismissing Cool Ideas's appeal. It agreed with the appellate court's purposive interpretation of the Housing Protection Act, finding that the statute prohibited the transaction contemplated in the building contract; it also agreed that the court could not sanction an arbitration award that effectuated an illegal transaction. Like the appellate court, the Constitutional Court emphasized that the Housing Protection Act did not invalidate the building contract between Cool Ideas and Hubbard, but instead made it illegal for Cool Ideas to seek consideration under the contract.

On the constitutional questions raised by this result, the majority decided that its refusal to enforce the arbitration award did not contravene Cool Ideas's constitutional rights to property and access to the courts. First, the majority found that there was no arbitrary deprivation of property in terms of the test outlined in FNB v Commissioner for the South African Revenue Services. Second, the majority found that there was no infringement of Cool Ideas's right of access to courts, only a redemption of the principle of legality.

== Minority judgments ==
In a separate concurrence, Justice Chris Jafta, joined by Justice Raymond Zondo, agreed with the majority's order but departed from some of the majority's reasoning; among other things, Jafta contended that the building contract was nullified by the Housing Protection Act.

Justice Johan Froneman wrote a dissent, joined by Justice Edwin Cameron, Acting Justice Nambitha Dambuza, and Justice Johann van der Westhuizen. He argued for upholding Cool Ideas's appeal on grounds of equity and public policy.
