= Hassam v Jacobs =

South African legal case

- Court: Constitutional Court of South Africa
- Full case name: Hassam v Jacobs NO and Others
- Decided: 15 July 2009
- Docket nos.: CCT 83/08
- Citations: [2009] ZACC 19; 2009 (11) BCLR 1148 (CC); 2009 (5) SA 572 (CC)

Case history
- Prior actions: Hassam v Jacobs NO and Others [2008] ZAWCHC 37 in the High Court of South Africa, Cape of Good Hope Provincial Division

Court membership
- Judges sitting: Langa CJ, Moseneke DCJ, Cameron J, Mokgoro J, Ngcobo J, Nkabinde J, O’Regan J, Sachs J, Skweyiya J, van der Westhuizen J and Yacoob J

Case opinions
- As a consequence of the constitutional right to equality, the word "spouse" as used in the Intestate Succession Act, 1987 includes the surviving partners to a polygamous Muslim marriage.
- Decision by: Nkabinde J (unanimous)

Hassam v Jacobs NO and Others, an important case in South African family law and law of succession, was heard in the Constitutional Court of South Africa on 19 February 2009 and decided on 15 July 2009. It concerned the proprietary consequences of polygynous Muslim marriage in the context of intestate succession.

In a unanimous opinion written by Justice Bess Nkabinde, the Constitutional Court held that it was inconsistent with the right to equality to deny polygynous Muslim spouses the rights of intestate inheritance and maintenance that were granted to other surviving spouses. Such spouses were therefore entitled to a portion of their deceased spouse's estate under the Intestate Succession Act, 1981. The judgment extended the ruling in Daniels v Campbell, which had come to the same conclusion in respect of monogamous Muslim spouses.

== Background ==
The case concerned the estate of Ebrahim Hassam, who died intestate on 22 August 2001. He had two wives, both married in accordance with Muslim rites: Fatima Gabie Hassam, married in 1972, and Miriam Hassam, married in 2000. Neither marriage had been solemnised under the Marriage Act, 1961. After his death, his first wife (the applicant) claimed for a portion of the deceased's estate under the Intestate Succession Act, 1981, as well as for maintenance from his estate under the Maintenance of Surviving Spouses Act, 1990.

The executor of the deceased's estate, Johan Hermanus Jacobs, refused to recognise her claims, contending that she could not be treated as the deceased's "survivor" or "spouse" for the purposes of the two Acts. The Constitutional Court of South Africa had recently found in Daniels v Campbell that the Acts' protections extended to the surviving partners of monogamous Muslim marriages, but that judgment did not consider the entitlement of partners in polygamous marriages. It was common cause that the deceased's marriage was polygynous, and Jacobs contended that the survivors of polygynous marriages were not "survivors" or "spouses" for the purposes of the Acts in question.

== High Court action ==
The applicant approached the High Court of South Africa for an order declaring that she – and other surviving partners of polygynous Muslim marriages – were entitled to the protections granted to surviving spouses under the Intestate Succession Act and Maintenance of Surviving Spouses Act. Alternatively, if and insofar as the Acts could not be interpreted to extend such protection, she sought an order declaring the acts to be unconstitutional. The attorney for Mrs Fatima Hassam was Igshaan Higgins of DKVG Attorneys and he was assisted by Attorneys Lynn Swartz and Faizel Bardien. Adv Tammy Carter was Counsel in the Western Cape High Court whilst Adv Wim Trengove SC assisted by Adv Kerisha Naicker in the Constitutional Court. The Women's Legal Centre Trust, represented by Geoff Budlender, was admitted as amicus curiae.

=== Constitutionality ===
On 18 July 2008, Judge Dennis van Heerden of the High Court's Cape Provincial Division handed down judgment in favour of the applicant. Applying the logic of the Constitutional Court's decision in Daniels v Campbell, and deferring also to "increasing legislative and judicial recognition" for customary marriages, he found that:

Unless the concept "spouse" and "survivor" are construed to encompass also widows of polygynous Muslim marriages the practical effect would be that the widows of such marriages will be discriminated against solely because of the exercise by their deceased husbands of the right accorded them by the tenets of a major faith to marry more than one woman. Such discrimination would not only amount to a violation of their rights to equality on the basis of marital status, religion (it being an aspect of a system of religious personal law) and culture but would also infringe their right to dignity.

Moreover, the limitation of these rights was not justified in terms of section 36 of the Constitution: the Minister of Justice and Constitutional Development (the fifth respondent) had advanced no grounds on which the discrimination was justified, nor were any such grounds self-evident. It was therefore unconstitutional for the surviving partners of polygynous Muslim marriages to be excluded from the protections granted to monogamous spouses under the Acts.

=== Remedy ===
The High Court's order instructed that the Acts should be read to include "a surviving partner to a polygamous Muslim marriage" as a "spouse" for the purposes of the Intestate Succession Act and as a "survivor" for the purposes of the Maintenance of Surviving Spouses Act.

However, residual "interpretive difficulties" were presented by the language of section 1(4)(f) of the Intestate Succession Act, which dealt with the division of a deceased person's estate among his spouse and descendants. The court therefore additionally declared that section 1(4)(f) was unconstitutional "to the extent that it makes provision for only one spouse in a Muslim marriage to be an heir in the intestate estate of their deceased husband"; it handed down alternative language which it ordered should be read into the section to rectify this.

== Proceedings ==
The High Court's declaration of constitutional invalidity in respect of the Intestate Succession Act was referred to the Constitutional Court for confirmation. No party opposed confirmation; indeed, the High Court's order was actively supported by the fifth respondent, the Minister of Justice, as well as by two amici curiae, the Women's Legal Centre Trust and Muslim Youth Movement of South Africa. Wim Trengove represented the applicant during the Constitutional Court's hearing, which was held on 19 February 2009, and judgment was delivered on 15 July 2009.

== Judgment ==
In a unanimous judgment written by Justice Bess Nkabinde, the Constitutional Court substantially endorsed the reasoning of the lower court: to exclude polygynous Muslim spouses from spousal intestate succession was to discriminate unfairly against them on the grounds of religion, marital status, and gender, all protected grounds in terms of section 9(3) of the Constitution.

The Constitutional Court therefore granted the application for confirmation of the declaration of constitutional validity, and it also substantially upheld the High Court's order. However, for the purposes of linguistic clarity, it departed from van Heerden's instruction that the term "spouse" should be read to include "a surviving partner to a polygamous Muslim marriage"; instead, it simply instructed that the term "spouse", wherever it appeared in section 1 of the Intestate Succession Act, should be read as meaning "spouse or spouses".

== Reception and significance ==
Hassam was heralded as a landmark decision in South African jurisprudence on Islamic personal law.

== See also ==
- Marriage Act, 1961
