= John Block (South African politician) =

South African politician

Provincial Chairman, ANC MEC for Finance, Economic Development and Tourism in the Northern Cape Provincial Government
- In office 2004 – 16 October 2015

Personal details
- Born: 10 February 1968 (age 58)
- Party: African National Congress
- Spouse: Noluthando Block

John Fikile Block (born 10 February 1968) is a former Provincial Chairman of the African National Congress in the Northern Cape Province, South Africa, and was a Member of the Executive Council (MEC) for Finance, Economic Development and Tourism in the Northern Cape Provincial Government. Block was found guilty of fraud, corruption and money laundering by the Northern Cape High Court in 2015. In December 2016 he was sentenced to 15 years' imprisonment.

== Political career ==
Block was Chairman of the African National Congress Youth League, Upington Branch, from 1991 to 1992.

Block became a Member Provincial Legislature in the Northern Cape Provincial Legislature in 1994. In 1999 he was appointed Member of Executive Council (MEC) for Transport, Roads and Public Works in the province, in which capacity he served until 2004 when he became MEC for Finance, Economic Development and Tourism.

On 14 October 2015, Block was found guilty of fraud, corruption and money laundering by the Northern Cape High Court. He subsequently resigned as Northern Cape African National Congress Chairman and MEC on 16 October 2015. The case against him stems from his relationship with Christo Scholtz, CEO of property company Trifecta Holdings, which Block was found to have assisted to lease properties to the Northern Cape Provincial Government at inflated costs and to have received kickbacks in return. On 10 March 2017 Block was granted leave to appeal against his conviction but not against the sentence. He was succeeded by Zamani Saul as ANC Provincial Chairperson.
