= Govender v Ragavayah =

Govender v Ragavayah is a significant piece of the South African law of succession. It is regarding property and inheritance rights, specifically regarding the rights of a surviving spouse in a Hindu marriage.

The applicant was a woman who had been married according to Hindu rites and whose husband had died intestate. According to the prevailing interpretation of the law, the parents of her husband stood to inherit his estate. The court noted that Hindu marriages were not recognised in South African law, which violated section 9 of the Constitution. The applicant sought a declaratory judgement, which was granted by the court.

Accordingly, the court ordered that the definition of “spouse” in section 1 of the Intestate Succession Act include the surviving spouse of a monogamous Hindu marriage. The ambit of this judgment was restricted to de facto monogamous Hindu marriages.

== See also ==
- South African law of succession
