= Children's Act, 2005 =

Act of the South African parliament focused on matters relating to children

Parliament of South Africa
- Citation: Act No. 38 of 2005
- Enacted by: Parliament of South Africa
- Assented to: 8 June 2006
- Commenced: 1 July 2007 / 1 April 2010

Legislative history
- Bill title: Children's Bill
- Bill citation: B70—2003
- Introduced by: Zola Skweyiya, Minister of Social Development
- Introduced: 11 November 2003

Amended by
- Children's Amendment Act, 2007; Child Justice Act, 2008
- Status: In force

The Children's Act, 2005 (Act No. 38 of 2005) is an act of the Parliament of South Africa that consolidates and reforms the law on matters related to children. It deals with topics including the age of majority, paternity, custody, child support, guardianship, parenting plans, children's courts, circumcision, day care, child protection, foster care, group homes, adoption, surrogacy, child abduction, and trafficking of children.

== History ==
Due to large support, the South African government decided on a set of rules and regulations regarding the country's Minors. This was introduced to the public eye in June 2006. Because of the division of powers between the national and Provincial governments, the statute was enacted in two parts. The original act, which was promulgated on 19 June 2006, contained only the provisions dealing with matters falling within the exclusive responsibility of the national government. The Children's Amendment Act, 2007, promulgated on 18 March 2008, amended the act to insert provisions dealing with matters for which the national and provincial governments share joint responsibility. Some provisions of the act, including the reduction of the age of majority from 21 to 18, came into force on 11 July 2007, while the rest came into force on 1 April 2010. Currently, all revisions have been made and are fully in force.

== Rights given ==
In long text, it is an act to give effect to certain rights of children as contained in the Constitution; to set out principles relating to the care and protection of children; to define parental responsibilities and rights; to make further provision regarding children's courts; to provide for partial care of children; to provide for early childhood development; to provide for the issuing of contribution orders; to provide for prevention and early intervention; to provide for children in alternative care; to provide for foster care; to provide for child and youth care centres and drop-in centres; to make new provision for the adoption of children; to provide for inter-country adoption; to give effect to the Hague Convention on Inter-country Adoption; to prohibit child abduction and to give effect to the Hague Convention on International Child Abduction; to provide for surrogate motherhood; and to create certain new offences relating to children; and to provide for matters connected therewith.
