= Northern Cape High Court =

Northern Cape Division of the High Court of South Africa
- Interactive map of Northern Cape Division of the High Court of South Africa
- 28.7459°S 24.7681°E
- Established: 1871 (Supreme Court of Griqualand West)
- Jurisdiction: Northern Cape, South Africa
- Location: Kimberley
- Coordinates: 28.7459°S 24.7681°E
- Composition method: Presidential appointment on the advice of the Judicial Service Commission
- Authorised by: Chp. 8 of the Constitution; Superior Courts Act, 2013
- Appeals to: Supreme Court of Appeal or Constitutional Court
- Number of positions: 7

Judge President
- Currently: Pule Tlaletsi
- Since: September 2017

Deputy Judge President
- Currently: Violet Phatshoane
- Since: July 2021

The Northern Cape High Court (in full the Northern Cape Division of the High Court of South Africa) is a superior court of law with general jurisdiction over the Northern Cape province of South Africa. The court sits at Kimberley and consists of seven judges.

== History ==
A Supreme Court was created for the British colony of Griqualand West by proclamation in 1871. The Cape Colony annexed Griqualand West according to the Griqualand West Annexation Act on 27 July 1877, with the date for annexation set for 18 October 1880. According to this act, the court was subordinated to the Cape Supreme Court and became known as the High Court of Griqualand West. On the creation of the Union of South Africa it became the Griqualand West Local Division of the Supreme Court of South Africa and remained subordinate to the Cape Provincial Division. In 1969 it became a provincial division in its own right as the Northern Cape Provincial Division. In 1997, on the adoption of the current Constitution of South Africa, it became a High Court, and in 2009 it was renamed the Northern Cape High Court by the Renaming of High Courts Act. In 2013, in the restructuring brought about by the Superior Courts Act, it became the Northern Cape Division of the High Court of South Africa.
