= List of judgments of the Constitutional Court of South Africa =

The following articles list the judgments of the Constitutional Court of South Africa by year of delivery and by author.

== Judgments by year ==
- List of judgments of the Constitutional Court of South Africa delivered in 1995
- List of judgments of the Constitutional Court of South Africa delivered in 1996
- List of judgments of the Constitutional Court of South Africa delivered in 1997
- List of judgments of the Constitutional Court of South Africa delivered in 1998
- List of judgments of the Constitutional Court of South Africa delivered in 1999
- List of judgments of the Constitutional Court of South Africa delivered in 2000
- List of judgments of the Constitutional Court of South Africa delivered in 2001
- List of judgments of the Constitutional Court of South Africa delivered in 2002
- List of judgments of the Constitutional Court of South Africa delivered in 2003
- List of judgments of the Constitutional Court of South Africa delivered in 2004
- List of judgments of the Constitutional Court of South Africa delivered in 2005
- List of judgments of the Constitutional Court of South Africa delivered in 2006
- List of judgments of the Constitutional Court of South Africa delivered in 2007
- List of judgments of the Constitutional Court of South Africa delivered in 2008
- List of judgments of the Constitutional Court of South Africa delivered in 2009
- List of judgments of the Constitutional Court of South Africa delivered in 2010
- List of judgments of the Constitutional Court of South Africa delivered in 2011
- List of judgments of the Constitutional Court of South Africa delivered in 2012
- List of judgments of the Constitutional Court of South Africa delivered in 2013
- List of judgments of the Constitutional Court of South Africa delivered in 2014
- List of judgments of the Constitutional Court of South Africa delivered in 2015
- List of judgments of the Constitutional Court of South Africa delivered in 2016
- List of judgments of the Constitutional Court of South Africa delivered in 2017
- List of judgments of the Constitutional Court of South Africa delivered in 2018
- List of judgments of the Constitutional Court of South Africa delivered in 2019
- List of judgments of the Constitutional Court of South Africa delivered in 2020
- List of judgments of the Constitutional Court of South Africa delivered in 2021
- List of judgments of the Constitutional Court of South Africa delivered in 2022
- List of judgments of the Constitutional Court of South Africa delivered in 2023
- List of judgments of the Constitutional Court of South Africa delivered in 2024
- List of judgments of the Constitutional Court of South Africa delivered in 2025
- List of judgments of the Constitutional Court of South Africa delivered in 2026

== Judgments by author ==
- List of Constitutional Court opinions of Arthur Chaskalson
- List of Constitutional Court opinions of Johann Kriegler
- List of Constitutional Court opinions of Pius Langa
- List of Constitutional Court opinions of Mogoeng Mogoeng
- List of Constitutional Court opinions of Dikgang Moseneke
- List of Constitutional Court opinions of Kate O'Regan
- List of Constitutional Court opinions of Albie Sachs
- List of Constitutional Court opinions of Johann van der Westhuizen
- List of Constitutional Court opinions of Zak Yacoob
