= List of judgments of the Constitutional Court of South Africa delivered in 2023 =

The table below lists the judgments of the Constitutional Court of South Africa delivered in 2023.

The members of the court at the start of 2023 were Chief Justice Raymond Zondo, Deputy Chief Justice Mandisa Maya, and judges Jody Kollapen, Mbuyiseli Madlanga, Steven Majiedt, Rammaka Mathopo, Nonkosi Mhlantla, Owen Rogers, Leona Theron and Zukisa Tshiqi.

Citation	Case name	Heard	Decided	Majority author
[2023] ZACC 1	Kapa v S	11 August 2022	24 January 2023	Majiedt
[2023] ZACC 2	Afrocentrics Projects and Services (Pty) Ltd t/a Innovative Distribution v State Information Technology Agency (SITA) SOC Ltd and Others		24 January 2023	Kollapen
[2023] ZACC 3	Mfoza Service Station (Pty) Ltd v Engen Petroleum Ltd and Another	17 May 2022	1 February 2023	Kollapen
[2023] ZACC 4	Rissik Street One Stop CC t/a Rissik Street Engen and Another v Engen Petroleum Ltd	4 August 2022	1 February 2023	Kollapen
[2023] ZACC 5	R v R	16 August 2022	1 February 2023	Tshiqi
[2023] ZACC 6	Agribee Beef Fund (Pty) Ltd and Another v Eastern Cape Development Agency and Another	6 September 2022	1 February 2023	Baqwa (acting)
[2023] ZACC 7	Minister of Tourism and Others v Afriforum NPC and Another	8 September 2022	8 February 2023	Zondo
[2023] ZACC 8	Ledla Structural Development (Pty) Ltd and Others v Special Investigating Unit	24 May 2022	10 March 2023	Mhlantla
[2023] ZACC 9	Minister of Water and Sanitation and Others v Lotter N.O. and Others; Minister of Water and Sanitation and Others v Wiid and Others; Minister of Water and Sanitation v South African Association for Water Users Associations	23 August 2022	15 March 2023	Madlanga
[2023] ZACC 10	Independent Community Pharmacy Association v Clicks Group Ltd and Others	28 September 2022	28 March 2023	Rogers
[2023] ZACC 11	National Union of Metalworkers of South Africa v Trenstar (Pty) Ltd	2 February 2023	18 April 2023	Rogers
[2023] ZACC 12	Speaker of the National Assembly and Others v New Nation Movement NPC and Others	20 January 2023	20 April 2023	Maya
[2023] ZACC 13	Arena Holdings (Pty) Ltd t/a Financial Mail and Others v South African Revenue Service and Others	23 August 2022	30 May 2023	Kollapen
[2023] ZACC 14	Mogale and Others v Speaker of the National Assembly and Others	23 February 2023	30 May 2023	Theron
[2023] ZACC 15	Makana Peoples Centre v Minister of Health and Others	10 November 2022	9 June 2023	Rogers
[2023] ZACC 16	Ashebo v Minister of Home Affairs and Others	16 February 2023	12 June 2023	Maya
[2023] ZACC 17	City of Cape Town v Independent Outdoor Media (Pty) Ltd and Others	3 November 2022	23 June 2023	Mbatha
[2023] ZACC 18	South African Iron and Steel Institute and Others v Speaker of the National Assembly and Others	21 February 2023	26 June 2023	Mathopo
[2023] ZACC 19	Bliss Brands (Pty) Ltd v Advertising Regulatory Board NPC and Others	2 March 2023	26 June 2023	Madlanga
[2023] ZACC 20	Fujitsu Services Core (Pty) Limited v Schenker South Africa (Pty) Limited	1 November 2022	28 June 2023	Zondo
[2023] ZACC 21	VJV and Another v Minister of Social Development and Another	8 November 2022	29 June 2023	Kollapen
[2023] ZACC 22	Centre for Child Law v T S and Others	22 November 2022	29 June 2023	Tshiqi
[2023] ZACC 23	South African Council for Educators v Deon Scheepers and Others	17 November 2022	12 July 2023	Baqwa
[2023] ZACC 24	Organisation Undoing Tax Abuse v Minister of Transport and Others	15 November 2022	12 July 2023	Zondo
[2023] ZACC 25	Democratic Alliance and Another v Public Protector of South Africa and Others	24 November 2022	13 July 2023	Maya
[2023] ZACC 26	Mudau v Municipal Employees Pension Fund and Others	7 March 2023	2 August 2023	Kollapen
[2023] ZACC 27	Koch & Kruger Brokers CC and Another v Financial Sector Conduct Authority and Others		15 August 2023	Rogers
[2023] ZACC 28	Rand Refinery Limited v Sehunane N.O. and Others		21 August 2023	Rogers
[2023] ZACC 29	Mncwabe v President of the Republic of South Africa and Others; Mathenjwa v President of the Republic of South Africa and Others	7 February 2023	24 August 2023	Majiedt
[2023] ZACC 30	Sasol Chevron Holdings Limited v Commissioner for the South African Revenue Service	4 May 2023	3 October 2023	Theron
[2023] ZACC 31	Nu Africa Duty Free Shops (Pty) Ltd v Minister of Finance and Others	20 October 2022	3 October 2023	Mathopo
[2023] ZACC 32	EB (born S) v ER (born B) and Others; KG v Minister of Home Affairs and Others	10 May 2023	10 October 2023	Rogers
[2023] ZACC 33	Liebenberg v S	18 May 2023	10 October 2023	Potterill
[2023] ZACC 34	Ex parte Minister of Home Affairs and Others; In re Lawyers for Human Rights v Minister of Home Affairs and Others	25 May 2023	30 October 2023	Majiedt
[2023] ZACC 35	Mmabasotho Christinah Olesitse N.O. v Minister of Police	16 February 2023	14 November 2023	Makgoka
[2023] ZACC 36	Groves N.O. v Minister of Police	14 February 2023	14 November 2023	Potterill
[2023] ZACC 37	Ad Hoc Central Authority for the Republic of SA and Another v Koch N.O. and Another	9 May 2023	27 November 2023	Majiedt
[2023] ZACC 38	Savoi and Others v National Prosecuting Authority and Another		28 November 2023	Theron
[2023] ZACC 39	Casino Association of South Africa and Others v Member of the Executive Council for Economic Development Environment Conservation and Tourism and Others	11 May 2023	29 November 2023	Makgoka
[2023] ZACC 40	Rayment and Others v Minister of Home Affairs and Others; Anderson and Others v Minister of Home Affairs and Others	28 February 2023	4 December 2023	Zondo
[2023] ZACC 41	Independent Candidate Association South Africa NPC v President of the Republic of South Africa and Others	29 August 2023	4 December 2023	Mhlantla
[2023] ZACC 42	One Movement South Africa NPC v President of the Republic of South Africa and Others	30 August 2023	4 December 2023	Zondo, Kollapen
[2023] ZACC 43	Saboath General Traders (Pty) Ltd t/a Sausage Saloon and Another v Mthatha Mall		12 December 2023	Majiedt
[2023] ZACC 44	Ditsoane v ACWA Power Africa Holdings		12 December 2023	Rogers
[2023] ZACC 45	Scalabrini Centre of Cape Town and Another v Minister of Home Affairs and Others	24 August 2023	12 December 2023	Schippers
[2023] ZACC 46	Le Roux and Another v Johannes G Coetzee and Seuns and Another	16 May 2023	18 December 2023	Kollapen
