= List of judgments of the Constitutional Court of South Africa delivered in 2022 =

The table below lists the judgments of the Constitutional Court of South Africa delivered in 2022.

The members of the court at the start of 2022 were Deputy Chief Justice and Acting Chief Justice Raymond Zondo, and judges Mbuyiseli Madlanga, Steven Majiedt, Nonkosi Mhlantla, Leona Theron, Zukisa Tshiqi, as well as two newly appointed judges, Jody Kollapen and Rammaka Mathopo, who began their terms on 1 January.

This left three vacancies on the court, including the Chief Justice position. President Cyril Ramaphosa elevated Raymond Zondo to the position of Chief Justice effective 1 April 2022, and announced his intention to nominate Justice Mandisa Maya as Deputy Chief Justice at the same time. In June 2022, Ramaphosa appointed Owen Rogers, who had been acting since 2021, to the Court, with his term commencing on 1 August 2022. On 25 July 2022, President Cyril Ramaphosa appointed President of the Supreme Court of Appeal Mandisa Maya as Deputy Chief Justice. Her term started on 1 September 2022. She was the first woman to be appointed to the position.

Acting judges on judgments delivered in 2022 included David Unterhalter and Pule Tlaletsi.

Citation	Case name	Heard	Decided	Majority author
[2022] ZACC 1	Speaker of the National Assembly v Public Protector and Others; Democratic Alliance v Public Protector and Others	8 November 2021	4 February 2022	Mhlantla
[2022] ZACC 2	Cash Paymaster Services (Pty) Ltd and Others v Freedom Under Law NPC and Others		11 February 2022	The Court
[2022] ZACC 3	Municipal Manager O.R. Tambo District Municipality and Another v Ndabeni	9 November 2021	14 February 2022	Pillay
[2022] ZACC 4	Minister of Finance v Afribusiness NPC	25 May 2021	16 February 2022	Madlanga
[2022] ZACC 5	South African Human Rights Commission obo South African Jewish Board of Deputies v Masuku and Another	27 August 2019	16 February 2022	Khampepe
[2022] ZACC 6	National Education Health and Allied Workers Union v Minister of Public Service and Administration and Others; South African Democratic Teachers Union and Others v Department of Public Service and Administration and Others; Public Servants Association and Others v Minister of Public Service and Administration and Others; National Union of Public Service and Allied Workers Union v Minister of Public Service and Administration and Others	24 August 2021	28 February 2022	Madondo
[2022] ZACC 7	Commercial Stevedoring Agricultural and Allied Workers' Union and Others v Oak Valley Estates (Pty) Ltd and Another	31 August 2021	1 March 2022	Theron
[2022] ZACC 8	Barnard Labuschagne Incorporated v South African Revenue Service and Another		11 March 2022	Rogers
[2022] ZACC 9	Municipal Employees Pension Fund and Another v Mongwaketse	30 November 2021	14 March 2022	Rogers
[2022] ZACC 10	Baloyi N.O. and Others v Pawn Stars CC and Another	23 November 2021	15 March 2022	Theron
[2022] ZACC 11	NVM obo VKM v Tembisa Hospital and Another	17 August 2021	25 March 2022	Rogers
[2022] ZACC 12	Ayres and Another v Minister of Justice and Correctional Services and Another		25 March 2022	Tlaletsi
[2022] ZACC 13	Damons v City of Cape Town	12 August 2022	30 March 2022	Pillay
[2022] ZACC 14	AK v Minister of Police	9 February 2022	5 April 2022	Tlaletsi
[2022] ZACC 15	Solidarity obo Members v Barloworld Equipment Southern Africa and Others	11 November 2021	6 May 2022	Tshiqi
[2022] ZACC 16	Minister of Police and Others v Fidelity Security Services	18 November 2021	27 May 2022	Majiedt and Rogers
[2022] ZACC 17	Minister of Finance v Sakeliga NPC (previously known as Afribusiness NPC) and Others		30 May 2022	Madlanga
[2022] ZACC 18	TM obo MM v Member of the Executive Council for Health and Social Development, Gauteng	15 February 2022	30 May 2022	Mathopo
[2022] ZACC 19	Tuta v The State	18 February 2022	31 May 2022	Unterhalter
[2022] ZACC 20	The Voice of the Unborn Baby and Another v Minister of Home Affairs and Another	4 November 2021	15 June 2022	Tlaletsi
[2022] ZACC 21	Transnet SOC Limited v Total South Africa (Pty) Limited and Another	16 November 2021	21 June 2022	Madlanga
[2022] ZACC 22	e.tv (Pty) Limited v Minister of Communications and Digital Technologies and Others; Media Monitoring Africa and Another v e.tv (Pty) Limited and Others	20 May 2022	28 June 2022	Mhlantla
[2022] ZACC 23	Women's Legal Centre Trust v President of the Republic of South Africa and Others	5 August 2021	28 June 2022	Tlaletsi
[2022] ZACC 24	Speaker of the National Assembly and Another v New Nation Movement NPC and Others	10 June 2022	29 June 2022	Unterhalter
[2022] ZACC 25	Merifon (Pty) Limited v Greater Letaba Municipality and Another	1 March 2022	4 July 2022	Mlambo
[2022] ZACC 26	Mamadi and Another v Premier of Limpopo Province and Others	10 March 2022	6 July 2022	Theron
[2022] ZACC 27	Social Justice Coalition and Others v Minister of Police and Others	3 February 2022	19 July 2022	Unterhalter
[2022] ZACC 28	Seebed CC t/a Siyabonga Convenience Centre v Engen Petroleum Limited		20 July 2022	Mhlantla
[2022] ZACC 29	Rafoneke and Others v Minister of Justice and Correctional Services and Others	24 February 2022	2 August 2022	Tshiqi
[2022] ZACC 30	Numsa obo Aubrey Dhludhlu and 147 Others v Marley Pipe Systems (SA) (Pty) Ltd		22 August 2022	Madlanga
[2022] ZACC 31	AmaBhungane Centre for Investigative Journalism NPC v President of the Republic of South Africa	31 May 2022	20 September 2022	Majiedt
[2022] ZACC 32	Grobler v Phillips and Others	10 May 2022	20 September 2022	Tshiqi
[2022] ZACC 33	Blind SA v Minister of Trade, Industry and Competition and Others	12 May 2022	21 September 2022	Unterhalter
[2022] ZACC 34	United Democratic Movement and Another v Lebashe Investment Group (Pty) Ltd and Others	2 November 2021	22 September 2022	Madondo
[2022] ZACC 35	Centre for Child Law v Director of Public Prosecutions, Johannesburg and Others	3 March 2022	29 September 2022	Mhlantla
[2022] ZACC 36	Competition Commission of South Africa v Group Five Construction Ltd	3 May 2022	27 October 2022	Majiedt
[2022] ZACC 37	Mineral Sands Resources (Pty) Ltd and Others v Reddell and Others	17 February 2022	14 November 2022	Majiedt
[2022] ZACC 38	Reddell and Others v Mineral Sands Resources (Pty) Ltd and Others	17 February 2022	14 November 2022	Majiedt
[2022] ZACC 39	Walus v Minister of Justice and Correctional Services and Others	22 February 2022	21 November 2022	Zondo
[2022] ZACC 40	Lebea v Menye and Another	25 November 2021	29 November 2022	Zondo
[2022] ZACC 41	Esorfranki Pipelines (Pty) Ltd v Mopani District Municipality	5 May 2022	30 November 2022	Theron
[2022] ZACC 42	Villa Crop Protection (Pty) Ltd v Bayer Intellectual Property GmbH	26 May 2022	8 December 2022	Mathopo
[2022] ZACC 43	South African Human Rights Commission v Standard Bank of South Africa Ltd and Others	19 May 2022	9 December 2022	Madlanga
[2022] ZACC 44	Eskom Holdings SOC Ltd v Vaal River Development Association (Pty) Ltd and Others	23 May 2022	23 December 2022	Madlanga
