= List of judgments of the Constitutional Court of South Africa delivered in 2021 =

The table below lists the judgments of the Constitutional Court of South Africa delivered in 2021.

The members of the court at the start of 2021 were Chief Justice Mogoeng Mogoeng, Deputy Chief Justice Raymond Zondo, and judges Chris Jafta, Sisi Khampepe, Mbuyiseli Madlanga, Steven Majiedt, Nonkosi Mhlantla, Leona Theron and Zukisa Tshiqi. At the start of the year there were two vacancies, and three more were created when Chief Justice Mogoeng Mogoeng retired with effect from 11 October, and Justices Sisi Khampepe and Chris Jafta retired with effect from November.

Acting judges on judgments delivered in 2021 included Pule Tlaletsi, Rammaka Mathopo, and Owen Rogers.

Citation	Case name	Heard	Decided	Majority author
[2021] ZACC 1	Rikhotso v Premier, Limpopo Province and Others		25 January 2021	Majiedt
[2021] ZACC 2	Secretary of the Judicial Commission of Inquiry into Allegations of State Capture, Corruption and Fraud in the Public Sector including Organs of State v Zuma	29 December 2020	28 January 2021	Jafta
[2021] ZACC 3	AmaBhungane Centre for Investigative Journalism NPC and Another v Minister of Justice and Correctional Services and Others; Minister of Police v AmaBhungane Centre for Investigative Journalism NPC and Others	25 February 2020	4 February 2021	Madlanga
[2021] ZACC 4	King N.O. and Others v De Jager and Others	11 February 2020	19 February 2021	Jafta
[2021] ZACC 5	Freedom Under Law v Minister of Social Development and Others		1 April 2021	The Court
[2021] ZACC 6	Member of the Executive Council for Health, Gauteng Provincial Government v PN		1 April 2021	Madlanga
[2021] ZACC 7	Sithole and Another v Sithole and Another	17 September 2020	14 April 2021	Tshiqi
[2021] ZACC 8	Wilkinson and Another v Crawford N.O. and Others	11 February 2020	16 April 2021	Mhlantla
[2021] ZACC 9	Competition Commission v Beefcor Proprietary Ltd and Another	23 February 2021	13 May 2021	Jafta
[2021] ZACC 10	Mahlangu and Another v Minister of Police	12 November 2020	14 May 2021	Tshiqi
[2021] ZACC 11	Clicks Retailers (Pty) Ltd v Commissioner for the South African Revenue Service	17 November 2020	21 May 2021	Theron
[2021] ZACC 12	Senwedi v S		21 May 2021	Majiedt
[2021] ZACC 13	University of Johannesburg v Auckland Park Theological Seminary and Another	5 November 2020	11 June 2021	Khampepe
[2021] ZACC 14	McGregor v Public Health and Social Development Sectoral Bargaining Council and Others		17 June 2021	Khampepe
[2021] ZACC 15	Mkhatshwa and Others v Mkhatshwa and Others		18 June 2021	Khampepe
[2021] ZACC 16	National Union of Mineworkers obo Masha and Others v SAMANCOR Limited (Eastern Chromes Mines) and Others		22 June 2021	Mhlantla
[2021] ZACC 17	Shembe and Others v Shembe N.O.	2 February 2021	22 June 2021	Theron
[2021] ZACC 18	Secretary of the Judicial Commission of Inquiry into Allegations of State Capture, Corruption and Fraud in the Public Sector including Organs of State v Zuma and Others	25 March 2021	29 June 2021	Khampepe
[2021] ZACC 19	Public Protector and Others v President of the Republic of South Africa and Others	26 November 2020	1 July 2021	Jafta
[2021] ZACC 20	Maroveke v Talane N.O. and Others		6 July 2021	Mhlantla
[2021] ZACC 21	Minister of Water and Sanitation v Sembcorp Siza Water (Pty) Ltd and Another	10 November 2020	21 July 2021	Jafta and Victor
[2021] ZACC 22	Qwelane v South African Human Rights Commission and Another	22 September 2020	30 July 2021	Majiedt
[2021] ZACC 23	BE obo JE v MEC for Social Development, Western Cape	25 February 2021	27 August 2021	Tshiqi
[2021] ZACC 24	Crompton Street Motors CC v Bright Idea Projects 66 (Pty) Ltd	9 March 2021	3 September 2021	Mhlantla
[2021] ZACC 25	Director of Public Prosecutions, Western Cape v Tucker	3 November 2020	6 September 2021	Mathopo, Theron, Jafta J
[2021] ZACC 26	Union for Police Security and Corrections Organisation v South African Custodial Management (Pty) Ltd and Others		7 September 2021	Khampepe
[2021] ZACC 27	RAiN Chartered Accountants Incorporated v South African Social Security Agency		10 September 2021	Madlanga
[2021] ZACC 28	Zuma v Secretary of the Judicial Commission of Inquiry into Allegations of State Capture, Corruption and Fraud in the Public Sector Including Organs of State and Others	12 July 2021	17 September 2021	Khampepe
[2021] ZACC 29	Electoral Commission v Minister of Cooperative Governance and Traditional Affairs and Others	20 August 2021	3 September 2021	Rogers
[2021] ZACC 30	Democratic Alliance in re Electoral Commission of South Africa v Minister of Cooperative Governance and Others		20 September 2021	The Court
[2021] ZACC 31	Centre for Child Law v Director General: Department of Home Affairs and Others	1 September 2021	22 September 2021	Victor
[2021] ZACC 32	Chairperson of the Council of UNISA v AfriForum NPC	20 May 2021	22 September 2021	Majiedt
[2021] ZACC 33	Former Way Trade and Invest (Pty) Limited v Bright Idea Projects 66 (Pty) Limited	9 March 2021	28 September 2021	Mhlantla
[2021] ZACC 34	Premier, Gauteng and Others v Democratic Alliance and Others; All Tshwane Councillors who are Members of the Economic Freedom Fighters and Another v Democratic Alliance and Others; African National Congress v Democratic Alliance and Others	10 September 2020	4 October 2021	Mathopo
[2021] ZACC 35	Competition Commission of South Africa v Mediclinic Southern Africa (Pty) Ltd and Another	11 March 2021	15 October 2021	Mogoeng
[2021] ZACC 36	Booi v Amathole District Municipality and Others	18 May 2021	19 October 2021	Khampepe
[2021] ZACC 37	Residents of Industry House, 5 Davies Street, New Doornfontein, Johannesburg and Others v Minister of Police and Others	24 November 2020	22 October 2021	Mhlantla
[2021] ZACC 38	Langa v Premier, Limpopo and Others	13 May 2021	5 November 2021	Theron
[2021] ZACC 39	Mtolo and Another v Lombard and Others	21 September 2021	8 November 2021	Madlanga
[2021] ZACC 40	Shiva Uranium (Pty) Limited (In Business Rescue) and Another v Tayob and Others	19 August 2021	9 November 2021	Rogers
[2021] ZACC 41	Union for Police Security and Corrections Organisation v South African Custodial Management (Pty) Ltd and Others	10 August 2021	12 November 2021	Madlanga
[2021] ZACC 42	Association of Mineworkers and Construction Union and Others v Anglo Gold Ashanti Limited t/a Anglo Gold Ashanti and Others	6 May 2021	12 November 2021	Pillay
[2021] ZACC 43	Mphephu-Ramabulana and Another v Mphephu and Others		12 November 2021	Khampepe
[2021] ZACC 44	Van Zyl N.O. v Road Accident Fund	2 March 2021	19 November 2021	Pillay
[2021] ZACC 45	Thubakgale and Others v Ekurhuleni Metropolitan Municipality and Others	18 February 2021	7 December 2021	Jafta
[2021] ZACC 46	Member of the Executive Council for Cooperative Governance and Traditional Affairs, KwaZulu-Natal v Nkandla Local Municipality and Others	11 May 2021	8 December 2021	Tshiqi
[2021] ZACC 47	National Union of Metalworkers of South Africa v Commission for Conciliation, Mediation and Arbitration and Others	4 May 2021	10 December 2021	Tlaletsi
[2021] ZACC 48	Burger N.O. and Others v Bester N.O. and Others	26 August 2021	13 December 2021	Mhlantla
[2021] ZACC 49	Bester N.O. and Others v Quintado 120 (Pty) Ltd	26 August 2021	13 December 2021	Mhlantla
[2021] ZACC 50	Abore v Minister of Home Affairs and Another	3 August 2021	30 December 2021	Tshiqi
[2021] ZACC 51	Bwanya v Master of the High Court, Cape Town and Others	16 February 2021	31 December 2021	Madlanga
