= List of judgments of the Constitutional Court of South Africa delivered in 2026 =

Judgments of supreme court of South Africa

The page below lists the judgments of the Constitutional Court of South Africa delivered in 2026.

The members of the court at the start of 2025 were as follows; Chief Justice Mandisa Maya, Deputy Chief Justice Dunstan Mlambo, and judges Jody Kollapen, Steven Majiedt, Rammaka Mathopo, Nonkosi Mhlantla, Owen Rogers, Leona Theron and Zukisa Tshiqi. Judges Nambitha Dambuza and Kate Savage were appointed to the court with effect from 1 May 2026.

Citation	Case name	Heard	Decided	Majority author
[2026] ZACC 1	Tholo Energy Services CC v Commissioner for the South African Revenue Service	26 August 2025	16 January 2026	Mathopo
[2026] ZACC 2	VVC v JRM and Others	25 February 2025	21 January 2026	Majiedt
[2026] ZACC 3	Director of Public Prosecutions, Johannesburg and Another v Schultz and Others; Director of Public Prosecutions, Bloemfontein v Cholota	4 November 2025	23 January 2026	Theron
[2026] ZACC 4	Lewis Stores Proprietary Ltd v Pepkor Holdings Ltd and Others	10 December 2025	30 January 2026	Majiedt
[2026] ZACC 5	Famous Idea Trading 4 (Pty) Ltd t/a Dely Road Courier Pharmacy v Government Employees Medical Scheme and Others	28 August 2025	11 February 2026	Musi
[2026] ZACC 6	Harris N.O. and Others v Herold Gie and Broadhead Inc.	13 May 2025	13 February 2026	Majiedt
[2026] ZACC 7	Maleka v Boyce N.O. and Others	12 September 2024	24 February 2026	Seegobin
[2026] ZACC 8	Democratic Alliance v Minister of Co-operative Governance and Traditional Affairs and Others	6 February 2025	27 February 2026	Theron
[2026] ZACC 9	Minister of Defence and Military Veterans and Others v O'Brien N.O.		10 March 2026	Majiedt
[2026] ZACC 10	Saziwa and Others v Mhlontlo Local Municipality and Others	27 February 2025	17 March 2026	Opperman
[2026] ZACC 11	South African Commercial Catering and Allied Workers Union v Massmart Holdings Ltd and Others	6 May 2025	25 March 2026	Majiedt
[2026] ZACC 12	Black Sash Trust and Another v Minister of Social Development and Others	27 May 2025	8 April 2026	Majiedt
[2026] ZACC 13	Systems Applications Consultants (Pty) Ltd t/a Securinfo v SAP SE and Another	8 May 2025	8 April 2026	Madlanga
[2026] ZACC 14	King Cetshwayo District Municipality v Water and Sanitation Services South Africa (Pty) Ltd and Others	18 November 2025	22 April 2026	Majiedt
[2026] ZACC 15	Absa Bank Ltd and Another v Commissioner for the South African Revenue Service	23 September 2025	22 April 2026	Majiedt
[2026] ZACC 16	South African Human Rights Commission v Agro Data CC and Another	25 November 2025	22 April 2026	Nicholls
[2026] ZACC 17	Economic Freedom Fighters and Another v Speaker of the National Assembly and Others	26 November 2024	8 May 2026	The Court
[2026] ZACC 18	Director-General, Department of Home Affairs and Others v Irankunda and Another	10 November 2025	12 May 2026	Kollapen
[2026] ZACC 19	Solidarity Trade Union and Others v Minister of Health and Others	9 September 2025	18 May 2026	Savage
[2026] ZACC 20	Centaur Mining South Africa (Pty) Ltd v Moodliar N.O. and Others	11 November 2025	12 May 2026	Musi
[2026] ZACC 21	Minister of Defence and Military Veterans and Another v Zeal Health Innovations (Pty) Ltd	6 November 2025	27 May 2026	Mathopo
[2026] ZACC 22	National Union of Metalworkers of South Africa and Others v Industrial Oleo Chemical Products	30 September 2025	29 May 2026	Tshiqi
[2026] ZACC 23	Barnard N.O. and Another v National Consumer Tribunal and Another	15 May 2025	3 June 2026	Kollapen
[2026] ZACC 24	Lueven Metals (Pty) Ltd v Commissioner for the South African Revenue Service	13 November 2025	23 June 2026	Theron
[2026] ZACC 25	Jordaan v MEC, Local Government, Environmental Affairs and Development Planning, Western Cape and Others	3 February 2026	24 June 2026	Savage
[2026] ZACC 26	Ex parte President of the Republic of South Africa: In re Constitutionality of the Copyright Amendment Bill and the Performers' Protection Amendment Bill	21 and 22 May 2025	26 June 2026	Mhlantla
[2026] ZACC 27	Minister of Police v Khedama		29 June 2026	Mathopo
[2026] ZACC 28	BNP Paribas v Competition Commission of South Africa; Credit Suisse Securities (USA) LLC v Competition Commission of South Africa; Competition Commission of South Africa v Bank of America Europe Designated Activity Company and Others	19 to 21 August 2025	30 June 2026	Rogers
[2026] ZACC 29	Adonisi and Others v Minister for Transport and Public Works, Western Cape and Others; Minister of Human Settlements and Another v Minister for Transport and Public Works, Western Cape and Others	11 February 2025	2 July 2026	Mhlantla
[2026] ZACC 30	Scalabrini Centre of Cape Town and Another v Minister of Home Affairs and Others	12 February 2026	7 July 2026	Majiedt
[2026] ZACC 31	Motjamela v George Local Municipality	28 May 2026	2 July 2026	Dambuza
[2026] ZACC 32	Tshabangu v S	26 February 2026	27 July 2026	Nuku
[2026] ZACC 33	Sustaining the Wild Coast NPC and Others v Minister of Mineral Resources and Energy and Others; Natural Justice and Another v Minister of Mineral Resources and Energy and Others	16 September 2025	14 August 2026	Kollapen
[2026] ZACC 34	Zuma and Another v Chairperson of the Judicial Commission of Inquiry into Allegations Regarding Efforts or Attempts Having Been Made to Stop the Investigation or Prosecution of Truth and Reconciliation Commission Cases and Others	29 June 2026	31 August 2026	Nuku, Rogers
[2026] ZACC 35	uMndeni weNkosi of iNkosi Luthuli and Another v Executive Council, KwaZulu-Natal and Others	24 February 2026	11 September 2026	Dambuza
[2026] ZACC 36	Mokasule N.O. and Others v Botha N.O. and Another		11 September 2026	Mlambo
[2026] ZACC 37	Premier of the Western Cape Government and Another v Speaker of the National Assembly and Others; City of Cape Town and Others v Speaker of the National Assembly and Others	18 May 2026	17 September 2026	Nuku
[2026] ZACC 38	Salungano Group Ltd v Mashwayi Projects (Pty) Ltd and Others; Ndalamo Coal (Pty) Ltd v Mashwayi Projects (Pty) Ltd and Others	19 February 2026	7 October 2026	Mathopo
[2026] ZACC 39	GD v Minister of Home Affairs and Others	26 May 2026	9 October 2026	Dambuza
[2026] ZACC 40	Grancy Property Limited and Another v Gihwala and Others	17 February 2026	9 October 2026	Mlambo
[2026] ZACC 41	Brain Gear Investments (Pty) Ltd v Buhle Waste (Pty) Ltd and Others; Sembcorp Silulumanzi (RF) (Pty) Ltd and Others v Buhle Waste (Pty) Ltd and Others; Sembcorp Utilities (Netherlands) NV v Buhle Waste (Pty) Ltd and Others	10 February 2026	9 October 2026	Rogers
[2026] ZACC 42	South African Hunters and Game Conservation Association v Speaker of the National Assembly and Others	26 May 2026	9 October 2026	Rogers
[2026] ZACC 43	Mofokeng and Another v President of the Republic of South Africa and Others		21 October 2026	Kollapen
