= List of judgments of the Constitutional Court of South Africa delivered in 2024 =

Judgments of supreme court of South Africa

The table below lists the judgments of the Constitutional Court of South Africa delivered in 2024.

The members of the court at the start of 2024 were the same as in 2023; Chief Justice Raymond Zondo, Deputy Chief Justice Mandisa Maya, and judges Jody Kollapen, Mbuyiseli Madlanga, Steven Majiedt, Rammaka Mathopo, Nonkosi Mhlantla, Owen Rogers, Leona Theron and Zukisa Tshiqi.

Zondo is due for mandatory retirement at the end of August and President Ramaphosa nominated Maya, who would become the first woman to hold the role, as Zondo's replacement as Chief Justice.

In July 2024, Ramaphosa appointed Maya as Chief Justice, effective September 2024.

The court did not hand down any judgements until April 2024, increasing concerns about the court's efficiency.

Citation	Case name	Heard	Decided	Majority author
[2024] ZACC 1	Capitec Bank Limited v Commissioner for the South African Revenue Service	5 September 2023	12 April 2024	Rogers
[2024] ZACC 2	Petrus Johannes Bestbier and Others v Nedbank Ltd	22 August 2023	12 April 2024	Tshiqi
[2024] ZACC 3	Coca-Cola Beverages Africa (Pty) Ltd v Competition Commission and Another	14 November 2023	17 April 2024	Dodson
[2024] ZACC 4	Mafisa v Road Accident Fund and Another	18 August 2023	25 April 2024	Mhlantla
[2024] ZACC 5	President of the Republic of South Africa and Another v Tembani and Others	7 November 2023	6 May 2024	Rogers
[2024] ZACC 6	Electoral Commission of South Africa v Umkhonto Wesizwe Political Party and Others	10 May 2024	20 May 2024	Theron
[2024] ZACC 7	African Congress for Transformation v Electoral Commission of South Africa; Labour Party of South Africa v Electoral Commission of South Africa and Others; Afrikan Alliance of Social Democrats v Electoral Commission of South Africa	8 May 2024	20 May 2024	Majiedt
[2024] ZACC 8	Regenesys Management (Pty) Ltd t/a Regenesys v Ilunga and Others	14 September 2023	21 May 2024	Zondo
[2024] ZACC 9	D H B v C S B	12 September 2023	22 May 2024	Theron
[2024] ZACC 10	City of Ekurhuleni Metropolitan Municipality In re: Unlawful Occupiers 1 Argyl Street and Others v Rohlandt Holdings CC and Others	23 November 2023	31 May 2024	Dodson
[2024] ZACC 11	Coronation Investment Management SA (Pty) Limited v Commissioner for the South African Revenue Service	13 February 2024	21 June 2024	Majiedt
[2024] ZACC 12	Mphephu-Ramabulana Royal Family v Premier of the Limpopo Province and Others	22 February 2024	21 June 2024	Theron
[2024] ZACC 13	AFGRI Animal Feeds (A Division of PhilAfrica Foods (Pty) Limited) v National Union of Metalworkers South Africa and Others	21 November 2023	21 June 2024	Schippers
[2024] ZACC 14	Minister of Rural Development and Land Reform v Land and Agricultural Development Bank of South Africa	17 August 2023	12 July 2024	Maya
[2024] ZACC 15	Chief Avhatendi Ratshibvumo Rambuda and Others v Tshibvumo Royal Family and Others	30 November 2023	17 July 2024	Mathopo
[2024] ZACC 16	Shoprite Checkers (Pty) Limited v Mafate N.O.	29 February 2024	15 August 2024	Madlanga
[2024] ZACC 17	Mamasedi v Chief of South African Defence Force and Others	6 February 2024	21 August 2024	Zondo
[2024] ZACC 18	Speaker of the National Assembly and Another v Women's Legal Centre Trust and Others	26 June 2024	18 September 2024	Mathopo
[2024] ZACC 19	Thistle Trust v Commissioner for the South Africa Revenue Service	8 February 2024	2 October 2024	Chaskalson
[2024] ZACC 20	Greater Tzaneen Municipality v Bravospan	20 February 2024	2 October 2024	Chaskalson
[2024] ZACC 21	President of the Republic of South Africa v Sigcau and Others	28 November 2023	3 October 2024	Tshiqi
[2024] ZACC 22	Botha v Smuts and Another	9 November 2023	9 October 2024	Kollapen, Chaskalson, Rogers, Zondo
[2024] ZACC 23	Swanepoel N.O. (Executor in the Estate Late Mignon Adelia Steyn) v Profmed Medical Scheme	14 March 2024	9 October 2024	Majiedt
[2024] ZACC 24	Rademeyer v Ferreira	9 May 2024	25 October 2024	Mathopo
[2024] ZACC 25	Govan Mbeki Local Municipality v Glencore Operations South Africa (Pty) Ltd and Others; Emalahleni Local Municipality v Glencore Operations South Africa (Pty) Ltd and Others	16 November 2023	19 November 2024	Chaskalson
[2024] ZACC 26	Commissioner for the South African Revenue Service v Medtronic International Trading S.A.R.L	20 August 2024	20 December 2024	Madlanga
[2024] ZACC 27	Charnell Commando and Others v City of Cape Town and Another	27 February 2024	20 December 2024	Mathopo
[2024] ZACC 28	Mawanda Makhala and Another v Director of Public Prosecutions, Western Cape	15 February 2024	20 December 2024	Tshiqi
[2024] ZACC 29	Motor Industry Staff Association and Another v Great South Autobody CC t/a Great South Panelbeaters; Solidarity obo Strydom and Others v State Information Technology Agency SOC Limited	2 November 2023	20 December 2024	Zondo, Van Zyl, Rogers
[2024] ZACC 30	O'Brien N.O. v Minister of Defence and Military Veterans and Others	8 August 2024	20 December 2024	Majiedt
[2024] ZACC 31	Sithole v S		20 December 2024	Mhlantla
[2024] ZACC 32	Mohlaba and Others v Minister of Cooperative Governance and Traditional Affairs and Others	17 September 2024	20 December 2024	Theron
