= List of judgments of the Constitutional Court of South Africa delivered in 2025 =

Judgments of supreme court of South Africa

The page below lists the judgments of the Constitutional Court of South Africa delivered in 2025.

The members of the court at the start of 2025 were as follows; Chief Justice Mandisa Maya, Acting Deputy Chief Justice Mbuyiseli Madlanga, and judges Jody Kollapen, Steven Majiedt, Rammaka Mathopo, Nonkosi Mhlantla, Owen Rogers, Leona Theron and Zukisa Tshiqi. Justice Madlanga retired with effect from 31 July 2025. Dunstan Mlambo, formerly the judge president of the Gauteng Division, was appointed to the court as deputy chief justice with effect from 1 August 2025.

Citation	Case name	Heard	Decided	Majority author
[2025] ZACC 1	Ekapa Minerals (Pty) Ltd and Another v Sol Plaatje Local Municipality and Others	6 May 2024	24 March 2025	Gamble
[2025] ZACC 2	United Manganese of Kalahari (Pty) Limited v Commissioner of the South African Revenue Service and four other cases	15 August 2024	31 March 2025	Rogers
[2025] ZACC 3	Commissioner for the South African Revenue Service and Another v Richards Bay Coal Terminal	5 August 2024	31 March 2025	Kollapen
[2025] ZACC 4	South African Municipal Workers Union v Minister of Cooperative Governance and Traditional Affairs and Another	10 September 2024	9 April 2025	Mathopo
[2025] ZACC 5	Prithilal v Akani Egoli (Pty) Ltd and Another		24 April 2025	Rogers
[2025] ZACC 6	Huntrex 277 (Pty) Ltd v Berzack and Others	12 March 2024	30 April 2025	Dodson
[2025] ZACC 7	Minister of Justice and Correctional Services and Others v Ntuli	14 November 2024	30 April 2025	Majiedt
[2025] ZACC 8	Democratic Alliance v Minister of Home Affairs and Another	5 November 2024	6 May 2025	Majiedt
[2025] ZACC 9	Blind SA v President of the Republic of South Africa and Others	28 November 2024	7 May 2025	Mhlantla
[2025] ZACC 10	Mothulwe v Labour Court, Johannesburg and Others		8 May 2025	Kollapen
[2025] ZACC 11	Mavundla v Gotcha Security Services (Pty) Ltd		18 June 2025	Goosen
[2025] ZACC 12	President of the Republic of South Africa v Speaker of the National Assembly and Others		25 July 2025	Madlanga
[2025] ZACC 13	Vodacom (Pty) Ltd v Makate and Another	21 November 2024	31 July 2025	Madlanga
[2025] ZACC 14	Shepstone and Wylie Attorneys v De Witt N.O. and Others	22 August 2024	1 August 2025	Tolmay
[2025] ZACC 15	Corruption Watch (RF) NPC v Speaker of the National Assembly and Others	6 March 2025	1 August 2025	Goosen
[2025] ZACC 16	Mereki and Others v Moladora Trust and Another	27 March 2025	1 August 2025	Rogers
[2025] ZACC 17	Mutsila v Municipal Gratuity Fund and Others	12 November 2024	8 August 2025	Theron
[2025] ZACC 18	Sunwest International (Pty) Ltd t/a Grandwest Casino and Entertainment World and Another v Western Cape Gambling and Racing Board and Another; Emfuleni Resorts (Pty) Ltd t/a Boardwalk Casino and Entertainment World and Another v Eastern Cape Gambling Board and Another	4 February 2025	29 August 2025	Kollapen
[2025] ZACC 19	Jordaan and Others v Minister of Home Affairs and Another	4 March 2025	11 September 2025	Theron
[2025] ZACC 20	Van Wyk and Others v Minister of Employment and Labour; Commission for Gender Equality and Another v Minister of Employment and Labour and Others	5 November 2024	3 October 2025	Tshiqi
[2025] ZACC 21	Zuma and Another v President of the Republic of South Africa and Others	30 July 2025	3 October 2025	Mathopo
[2025] ZACC 22	Minister of Cooperative Governance and Traditional Affairs v Speaker of the National Assembly and Others		10 October 2025	Theron
[2025] ZACC 23	Municipal Employees Pension Fund v City of Johannesburg Metropolitan Municipality and Others	19 November 2024	21 October 2025	Seegobin
[2025] ZACC 24	Godloza and Another v S	7 March 2024	5 November 2025	Mhlantla and Theron
[2025] ZACC 25	South African Riding for the Disabled Association v Regional Land Claims Commission, Western Cape and Others	2 September 2025	13 November 2025	Kollapen
[2025] ZACC 26	Socialist Agenda of Dispossessed Africans v Minister of Cooperative Governance and Traditional Affairs	11 September 2025	20 November 2025	Majiedt
[2025] ZACC 27	Golden Core Trade and Invest (Pty) Ltd v Merafong City Local Municipality and Another	7 November 2024	15 December 2025	Tolmay
[2025] ZACC 29	Wares v Additional Magistrate, Simonstown and Others	13 February 2025	23 December 2025	Dambuza
