= List of judgments of the Constitutional Court of South Africa delivered in 2020 =

The table below lists the judgments of the Constitutional Court of South Africa delivered in 2020.

The members of the court at the start of 2020 were Chief Justice Mogoeng Mogoeng, Deputy Chief Justice Raymond Zondo, and judges Johan Froneman, Chris Jafta, Sisi Khampepe, Mbuyiseli Madlanga, Steven Majiedt, Nonkosi Mhlantla, Leona Theron and Zukisa Tshiqi. At the start of the year there was one vacancy, and a second was created when Justice Froneman retired with effect from 31 May.

| Citation | Case name | Heard | Decided | Majority author |
|---|---|---|---|---|
| [2020] ZACC 1 | Association of Mineworkers and Construction Union and Others v Royal Bafokeng Platinum Limited and Others | 30 May 2019 | 23 January 2020 | Froneman |
| [2020] ZACC 2 | Competition Commission of South Africa v Standard Bank of South Africa Limited | 5 March 2019 | 20 February 2020 | Jafta and Khampepe |
| [2020] ZACC 3 | MEC for Health, Western Cape v Coetzee and Others | 14 November 2019 | 20 March 2020 | Mathopo (acting) |
| [2020] ZACC 4 | Maswanganyi v Minister of Defence and Military Veterans and Others | 19 November 2019 | 20 March 2020 | Tshiqi |
| [2020] ZACC 5 | Normandien Farms (Pty) Limited v South African Agency for Promotion of Petroleum Exportation and Exploitation (SOC) Limited and Others | 26 November 2019 | 24 March 2020 | Mhlantla |
| [2020] ZACC 6 | National Director of Public Prosecutions v Botha N.O. and Another | 5 September 2019 | 26 March 2020 | Jafta |
| [2020] ZACC 7 | National Union of Metal Workers of South Africa v Lufil Packaging (Isithebe) and Others | 21 November 2019 | 26 March 2020 | Victor (acting) |
| [2020] ZACC 8 | Association of Mineworkers and Construction Union and Others v Ngululu Bulk Carriers (Pty) Limited (In Liquidation) and Others | 6 February 2020 | 6 May 2020 | Jafta |
| [2020] ZACC 9 | A M v H M | | 26 May 2020 | Mhlantla |
| [2020] ZACC 10 | Economic Freedom Fighters v Gordhan and Others; Public Protector and Another v Gordhan and Others | 28 November 2019 | 29 May 2020 | Khampepe |
| [2020] ZACC 11 | New Nation Movement NPC and Others v President of the Republic of South Africa and Others | 15 August 2019 | 11 June 2020 | Madlanga |
| [2020] ZACC 12 | AB and Another v Pridwin Preparatory School and Others | 16 May 2019 | 17 June 2020 | Theron |
| [2020] ZACC 13 | Beadica 231 CC and Others v Trustees for the time being of the Oregon Trust and Others | 5 November 2019 | 17 June 2020 | Theron |
| [2020] ZACC 14 | Competition Commission of South Africa v Pickfords Removals SA (Pty) Limited | 27 February 2020 | 24 June 2020 | Majiedt |
| [2020] ZACC 15 | Telkom SA SOC Limited v City of Cape Town and Another | 12 March 2020 | 25 June 2020 | Jafta |
| [2020] ZACC 16 | Big G Restaurants (Pty) Limited v Commissioner for the South African Revenue Service | 12 November 2019 | 21 July 2020 | Madlanga |
| [2020] ZACC 17 | Penwill v Penwill NO and Others | | 21 July 2020 | Madlanga |
| [2020] ZACC 18 | Tjiroze v Appeal Board of the Financial Services Board | | 21 July 2020 | Madlanga |
| [2020] ZACC 19 | Van der Walt v S | | 21 July 2020 | Madlanga |
| [2020] ZACC 20 | Chisuse and Others v Director-General, Department of Home Affairs and Another | 13 February 2020 | 22 July 2020 | Khampepe |
| [2020] ZACC 21 | Road Traffic Management Corporation v Tasima (Pty) Limited; Tasima (Pty) Limited v Road Traffic Management Corporation | 13 August 2019 | 4 August 2020 | Theron |
| [2020] ZACC 22 | Ramabele v S; Msimango v S | | 16 September 2020 | Mhlantla |
| [2020] ZACC 23 | National Union of Metal Workers of South Africa and Others v Aveng Trident Steel (a division of Aveng Africa (Pty) Ltd) and Another | 5 March 2020 | 27 October 2020 | Mathopo (acting) |
| [2020] ZACC 24 | Mahlangu and Another v Minister of Labour and Others | 10 March 2020 | 19 November 2020 | Victor (acting) |
| [2020] ZACC 25 | Economic Freedom Fighters and Another v Minister of Justice and Correctional Services and Another | 18 February 2020 | 27 November 2020 | Mogoeng |
| [2020] ZACC 26 | Sonke Gender Justice NPC v President of the Republic of South Africa and Others | 3 March 2020 | 4 December 2020 | Theron |
| [2020] ZACC 27 | Baloyi v Public Protector and Others | | 4 December 2020 | Theron |
| [2020] ZACC 28 | Public Protector v Commissioner for the South African Revenue Service and Others | 3 September 2020 | 15 December 2020 | Madlanga |
| [2020] ZACC 29 | Smit v Minister of Justice and Correctional Services and Others | 20 February 2020 | 18 December 2020 | Madlanga |
| [2020] ZACC 30 | Moko v Acting Principal of Malusi Secondary School and Others | | 28 December 2020 | Khampepe |
