= List of judgments of the Constitutional Court of South Africa delivered in 2019 =

The table below lists the judgments of the Constitutional Court of South Africa delivered in 2019.

The members of the court at the start of 2019 were Chief Justice Mogoeng Mogoeng, Deputy Chief Justice Raymond Zondo, and judges Edwin Cameron, Johan Froneman, Chris Jafta, Sisi Khampepe, Mbuyiseli Madlanga, Nonkosi Mhlantla and Leona Theron. There were two vacancies. Justice Cameron retired with effect from 20 August. Zukisa Tshiqi and Steven Majiedt were appointed to the court with effect from 1 October.

Citation	Case name	Heard	Decided	Majority author
[2019] ZACC 1	Mulowayi and Others v Minister of Home Affairs and Another		29 January 2019	Mhlantla
[2019] ZACC 2	Competition Commission of South Africa v Hosken Consolidated Investments Limited and Another	16 August 2018	1 February 2019	Basson (acting)
[2019] ZACC 3	Stokwe v Member of the Executive Council: Department of Education, Eastern Cape and Others		7 February 2019	Petse (acting)
[2019] ZACC 4	Jacobs and Others v S	1 March 2018	14 February 2019	no majority
[2019] ZACC 5	Aquila Steel (S Africa) (Pty) Ltd v Minister of Mineral Resources and Others	23 August 2018	15 February 2019	Cameron
[2019] ZACC 6	Cloete and Another v S; Sekgala v Nedbank Limited		19 February 2019	Theron
[2019] ZACC 7	Long v South African Breweries (Pty) Ltd and Others		19 February 2019	Theron
[2019] ZACC 8	Trustees of the Simcha Trust v Da Cruz and Others; City of Cape Town v Da Cruz and Others		19 February 2019	Theron
[2019] ZACC 9	Buffalo City Metropolitan Municipality v Metgovis (Pty) Limited	21 November 2018	28 February 2019	Khampepe
[2019] ZACC 10	Speaker of the National Assembly and Another v Land Access Movement of South Africa and Others	6 November 2018	19 March 2019	Mhlantla
[2019] ZACC 11	Nekokwane v Road Accident Fund	13 November 2018	26 March 2019	Froneman
[2019] ZACC 12	Road Traffic Management Corporation v Waymark Infotech (Pty) Limited	20 November 2018	2 April 2019	Petse (acting)
[2019] ZACC 13	Kruger v National Director of Public Prosecutions		9 April 2019	Froneman
[2019] ZACC 14	Tiekiedraai Eiendomme (Pty) Limited v Shell South Africa Marketing (Pty) Limited and Others	12 February 2019	9 April 2019	Cameron
[2019] ZACC 15	Buffalo City Metropolitan Municipality v Asla Construction (Pty) Limited	4 September 2018	16 April 2019	Theron
[2019] ZACC 16	Spilhaus Property Holdings (Pty) Limited and Others v MTN and Another	7 February 2019	24 April 2019	Jafta
[2019] ZACC 17	Steenkamp and Others v Edcon Limited	14 November 2018	30 April 2019	Basson (acting)
[2019] ZACC 18	Phaahla v Minister of Justice and Correctional Services and Another (Tlhakanye Intervening)	8 November 2018	3 May 2019	Dlodlo (acting)
[2019] ZACC 19	Makhokha v S		3 May 2019	Madlanga
[2019] ZACC 20	Shipalana v S		17 May 2019	Froneman
[2019] ZACC 21	Muhanelwa v Gcingca		17 May 2019	Froneman
[2019] ZACC 22	S v S and Another	12 March 2019	27 June 2019	Nicholls (acting)
[2019] ZACC 23	General Council of the Bar of South Africa v Jiba and Others	14 March 2019	27 June 2019	Jafta
[2019] ZACC 24	Nandutu and Others v Minister of Home Affairs and Others	21 February 2019	28 June 2019	Mhlantla
[2019] ZACC 25	National Union of Metalworkers of South Africa obo Nganezi and Others v Dunlop Mixing and Technical Services (Pty) Limited and Others	28 February 2019	28 June 2019	Froneman
[2019] ZACC 26	Competition Commission of South Africa v Media 24 (Pty) Limited	22 November 2018	3 July 2019	no majority
[2019] ZACC 27	New Nation Movement NPC and Others v President of the Republic of South Africa and Others	2 May 2019	3 July 2019	Theron
[2019] ZACC 28	National Energy Regulator of South Africa and Another v PG Group (Pty) Limited and Others	26 February 2019	15 July 2019	Khampepe
[2019] ZACC 29	Public Protector v South African Reserve Bank	27 November 2018	22 July 2019	Khampepe and Theron
[2019] ZACC 30	Mwelase and Others v Director-General for the Department of Rural Development and Land Reform and Another	23 May 2019	20 August 2019	Cameron
[2019] ZACC 31	Herbert N.O. and Others v Senqu Municipality and Others	21 May 2019	22 August 2019	Jafta
[2019] ZACC 32	De Klerk v Minister of Police	15 November 2018	22 August 2019	Theron
[2019] ZACC 33	Dykema v Malebane and Another	28 May 2019	10 September 2019	Froneman
[2019] ZACC 34	Freedom of Religion South Africa v Minister of Justice and Constitutional Development and Others	29 November 2018	18 September 2019	Mogoeng
[2019] ZACC 35	President of the Republic of South Africa v Democratic Alliance and Others	14 February 2019	18 September 2019	Mogoeng
[2019] ZACC 36	Magnificent Mile Trading 30 (Pty) Limited v Charmaine Celliers N.O. and Others	7 March 2019	9 October 2019	Madlanga
[2019] ZACC 37	Moodley v Kenmont School and Others	14 May 2019	9 October 2019	Madlanga
[2019] ZACC 38	Gelyke Kanse and Others v Chairperson of the Senate of the University of Stellenbosch and Others	8 August 2019	10 October 2019	Cameron
[2019] ZACC 39	Masemola v Special Pensions Appeal Board and Another	6 August 2019	15 October 2019	Mhlantla
[2019] ZACC 40	Moyo and Another v Minister of Police and Others	19 February 2019	22 October 2019	Ledwaba (acting)
[2019] ZACC 41	Ascendis Animal Health (Pty) Limited v Merck Sharpe Dohme Corporation and Others	9 May 2019	24 October 2019	no majority
[2019] ZACC 42	Shabangu v Land and Agricultural Development Bank of South Africa and Others	1 August 2019	29 October 2019	Froneman
[2019] ZACC 43	Notyawa v Makana Municipality and Others	3 September 2019	21 November 2019	Jafta
[2019] ZACC 44	Minister of Justice and Correctional Services v Ramuhovhi and Others		26 November 2019	Mhlantla
[2019] ZACC 45	Amalungelo Workers' Union and Others v Philip Morris South Africa (Pty) Limited and Another		26 November 2019	Jafta
[2019] ZACC 46	Centre for Child Law and Others v Media 24 Limited and Others	7 May 2019	4 December 2019	Mhlantla
[2019] ZACC 47	Independent Institute of Education (Pty) Limited v Kwazulu-Natal Law Society and Others	29 August 2019	11 December 2019	Mogoeng
[2019] ZACC 48	Tshabalala v S; Ntuli v S	22 August 2019	11 December 2019	Mathopo (acting)
