= List of judgments of the Constitutional Court of South Africa delivered in 2012 =

The table below lists the judgments of the Constitutional Court of South Africa delivered in 2012.

The members of the court at the start of 2012 were Chief Justice Mogoeng Mogoeng, Deputy Chief Justice Dikgang Moseneke, and judges Edwin Cameron, Johan Froneman, Chris Jafta, Sisi Khampepe, Bess Nkabinde, Thembile Skweyiya, Johann van der Westhuizen and Zak Yacoob. The seat left empty by the retirement of Sandile Ngcobo in August 2011 was filled by the appointment of Raymond Zondo in September 2012.

Citation	Case name	Heard	Decided	Majority author
[2012] ZACC 1	C and Others v Department of Health and Social Development, Gauteng and Others	16 August 2011	11 January 2012	Yacoob
[2012] ZACC 2	Maphango and Others v Aengus Lifestyle Properties (Pty) Ltd	3 November 2011	13 March 2012	Cameron
[2012] ZACC 3	Premier: Limpopo Province v Speaker of the Limpopo Provincial Legislature and Others	8 November 2011	22 March 2012	Khampepe
[2012] ZACC 4	Hlophe v Premier of the Western Cape Province; Hlophe v Freedom Under Law and Others	29 November 2011	30 March 2012	The Court
[2012] ZACC 5	Wiese v Government Employees Pension Fund and Others		30 March 2012	Nkabinde
[2012] ZACC 6	Competition Commission of South Africa v Senwes Ltd	22 November 2011	12 April 2012	Jafta
[2012] ZACC 7	Maccsand (Pty) Ltd v City of Cape Town and Others	16 February 2012	12 April 2012	Jafta
[2012] ZACC 8	Minister for Mineral Resources v Swartland Municipality and Others	16 February 2012	12 April 2012	Jafta
[2012] ZACC 9	Occupiers of Saratoga Avenue v City of Johannesburg Metropolitan Municipality and Another	30 March 2012	24 May 2012	Froneman
[2012] ZACC 10	MEC for Local Government, Environmental Affairs and Development Planning, Western Cape, in re: Minister for Mineral Resources v Swartland Municipality and Others and Maccsand (Pty) Ltd v City of Cape Town and Others		29 May 2012	The Court
[2012] ZACC 11	Sebola and Another v Standard Bank of South Africa Ltd and Another	14 February 2012	7 June 2012	Cameron
[2012] ZACC 12	Van der Burg and Another v National Director of Public Prosecutions	8 March 2012	12 June 2012	Van der Westhuizen
[2012] ZACC 13	South African Transport and Allied Workers Union and Another v Garvas and Others	9 February 2012	13 June 2012	Mogoeng
[2012] ZACC 14	Competition Commission v Yara South Africa (Pty) Ltd and Others	24 November 2011	26 June 2012	Zondo (acting)
[2012] ZACC 15	Competition Commission v Loungefoam (Pty) Ltd and Others	7 February 2012	26 June 2012	Maya (acting)
[2012] ZACC 16	Minister of Home Affairs and Others v Tsebe and Others; Minister of Justice and Constitutional Development and Another v Tsebe and Others	23 February 2012	27 July 2012	Zondo (acting)
[2012] ZACC 17	Camps Bay Ratepayers and Residents Association and Another v Harrison and Another (costs)		20 September 2012	The Court
[2012] ZACC 18	National Treasury and Others v Opposition to Urban Tolling Alliance and Others	15 August 2012	20 September 2012	Moseneke
[2012] ZACC 19	South African Transport and Allied Workers Union and Others v Moloto NO and Another	10 May 2012	21 September 2012	Yacoob, Froneman and Nkabinde
[2012] ZACC 21	PFE International Inc (BVI) and Others v Industrial Development Corporation of South Africa Ltd	14 August 2012	27 September 2012	Jafta
[2012] ZACC 22	Print Media South Africa and Another v Minister of Home Affairs and Another	13 March 2012	28 September 2012	Skweyiya
[2012] ZACC 23	Bogaards v S	3 May 2012	28 September 2012	Khampepe
[2012] ZACC 24	Democratic Alliance v President of the Republic of South Africa and Others	8 May 2012	5 October 2012	Yacoob
[2012] ZACC 25	Children's Institute v Presiding Officer of the Children's Court, District of Krugersdorp and Others	18 September 2012	9 October 2012	Khampepe
[2012] ZACC 26	Schubart Park Residents' Association and Others v City of Tshwane Metropolitan Municipality and Another	23 August 2012	9 October 2012	Froneman
[2012] ZACC 27	Oriani-Ambrosini, MP v Sisulu, MP, Speaker of the National Assembly	7 August 2012	9 October 2012	Mogoeng
[2012] ZACC 28	Giant Concerts CC v Rinaldo Investments (Pty) Ltd and Others	4 September 2012	29 November 2012	Cameron
[2012] ZACC 29	National Credit Regulator v Opperman and Others	21 August 2012	10 December 2012	Van der Westhuizen
[2012] ZACC 30	Lee v Minister of Correctional Services	28 August 2012	11 December 2012	Nkabinde
[2012] ZACC 31	Ramakatsa and Others v Magashule and Others	20 November 2012 and 29 November 2012	18 December 2012	Moseneke and Jafta
