= List of judgments of the Constitutional Court of South Africa delivered in 1997 =

The table below lists the judgments of the Constitutional Court of South Africa delivered in 1997.

The members of the court at the start of 1997 were President Arthur Chaskalson and judges Lourens Ackermann, John Didcott, Richard Goldstone, Johann Kriegler, Pius Langa, Tholie Madala, Yvonne Mokgoro, Kate O'Regan and Albie Sachs. One seat was vacant, as at the end of 1996 Deputy President Ismail Mahomed was appointed Chief Justice of the Supreme Court of Appeal. In August 1997, Justice Langa was elevated to the post of Deputy President. A new judge to fill the open seat was not appointed until 1998.

Citation	Case name	Heard	Decided	Majority author
[1997] ZACC 1	Fraser v Children's Court, Pretoria North and Others	12 September 1996	5 February 1997	Mahomed
[1997] ZACC 2	S v Coetzee and Others	19 March 1996	6 March 1997	Langa
[1997] ZACC 3	Motsepe v Commissioner for Inland Revenue	4 March 1997	27 March 1997	Ackermann
[1997] ZACC 4	President of the Republic of South Africa and Another v Hugo	12 November 1996	18 April 1997	Goldstone
[1997] ZACC 5	Prinsloo v Van der Linde and Another	7 November 1996	18 April 1997	Ackermann, O'Regan and Sachs
[1997] ZACC 6	Fose v Minister of Safety and Security	10 September 1996	5 June 1997	Ackermann
[1997] ZACC 7	Minister of Justice v Ntuli	22 May 1997	5 June 1997	Chaskalson
[1997] ZACC 8	Certification of the Constitution of the Western Cape, 1997	14–15 May 1997	2 September 1997	The Court
[1997] ZACC 9	Parbhoo and Others v Getz NO and Another		18 September 1997	Ackermann
[1997] ZACC 10	S v Pennington and Another	21 August 1997	18 September 1997	Chaskalson
[1997] ZACC 11	S v Lawrence; S v Negal; S v Solberg	6 May 1997	6 October 1997	Chaskalson
[1997] ZACC 12	Harksen v Lane NO and Others	26 August 1997	7 October 1997	Goldstone
[1997] ZACC 13	Hekpoort Environmental Preservation Society and Another v Minister of Land Affairs and Others		8 October 1997	Ackermann
[1997] ZACC 14	S v Ntsele		14 October 1997	Kriegler
[1997] ZACC 15	Certification of the Amended Text of the Constitution of the Western Cape, 1997	18 November 1997	18 November 1997	The Court
[1997] ZACC 16	Larbi-Odam and Others v MEC for Education (North-West Province) and Another	27 May 1997	26 November 1997	Mokgoro
[1997] ZACC 17	Soobramoney v Minister of Health, KwaZulu-Natal	11 November 1997	27 November 1997	Chaskalson
[1997] ZACC 18	Sanderson v Attorney-General, Eastern Cape	2 September 1997	2 December 1997	Kriegler
[1997] ZACC 19	East Zulu Motors (Pty) Ltd v Empangeni/Ngwelezane Transitional Local Council and Others	20 May 1997	4 December 1997	Madala
