= List of judgments of the Constitutional Court of South Africa delivered in 2001 =

The table below lists the judgments of the Constitutional Court of South Africa delivered in 2001.

The members of the court during 2001 were President Arthur Chaskalson, Deputy President Pius Langa, and judges Lourens Ackermann, Richard Goldstone, Johann Kriegler, Tholie Madala, Yvonne Mokgoro, Sandile Ngcobo, Kate O'Regan, Albie Sachs and Zak Yacoob. In November the Sixth Amendment of the Constitution of South Africa renamed the post of President of the Constitutional Court to Chief Justice of South Africa, and the post of Deputy President to Deputy Chief Justice.

Citation	Case name	Heard	Decided	Majority author
[2001] ZACC 13	Ex Parte Hansmann		22 February 2001	The Court
[2001] ZACC 14	Lane and Fey NNO v Dabelstein		6 March 2001	Goldstone and Kriegler
[2001] ZACC 15	Mkangeli and Others v Joubert and Others		6 March 2001	Chaskalson
[2001] ZACC 16	S v Dodo	22 March 2001	5 April 2001	Ackermann
[2001] ZACC 17	S v Mamabolo	27 February 2001	11 April 2001	Kriegler
[2001] ZACC 18	Mohamed and Another v President of the Republic of South Africa and Others	10 May 2001	28 May 2001	The Court
[2001] ZACC 19	Minister of Public Works and Others v Kyalami Ridge Environmental Association and Others	15 March 2001	29 May 2001	Chaskalson
[2001] ZACC 20	Booysen and Others v Minister of Home Affairs and Another	22 May 2001	4 June 2001	Sachs
[2001] ZACC 23	Independent Electoral Commission v Langeberg Municipality	20 February 2001	7 June 2001	Yacoob
[2001] ZACC 21	Moise v Greater Germiston Transitional Local Council	16 May 2001	4 July 2001	Somyalo (acting)
[2001] ZACC 22	Carmichele v Minister of Safety and Security and Another	20 March 2001	16 August 2001	Ackermann and Goldstone
[2001] ZACC 24	Wallach v Selvan and Others		21 August 2001	Kriegler
[2001] ZACC 1	S v Price		4 September 2001	Yacoob
[2001] ZACC 2	Ex Parte Women's Legal Centre, in re: Moise v Greater Germiston Transitional Local Council		21 September 2001	Kriegler
[2001] ZACC 9	De Beer NO v North-Central Local Council and South-Central Local Council and Others	3 May 2001	26 September 2001	Yacoob
[2001] ZACC 10	In re: Constitutionality of the Mpumalanga Petitions Bill, 2000	16 August 2001	5 October 2001	Langa
[2001] ZACC 12	Minister of Defence v Potsane and Another; Legal Soldier (Pty) Ltd and Others v Minister of Defence and Others	23 August 2001	5 October 2001	Kriegler
[2001] ZACC 25	Minister of Education v Harris	21 August 2001	5 October 2001	Sachs
[2001] ZACC 3	Minister of Home Affairs v Liebenberg		8 October 2001	Skweyiya
[2001] ZACC 4	Potgieter v MEC for Health, Gauteng and Others	20 September 2001	8 October 2001	Skweyiya
[2001] ZACC 11	S v Niemand	22 February 2001	8 October 2001	Madala
[2001] ZACC 5	President of the Republic of South Africa and Others v Gauteng Lions Rugby Union		22 November 2001	Kriegler
[2001] ZACC 6	Fredericks and Others v MEC for Education and Training, Eastern Cape and Others	4 September 2001	4 December 2001	O'Regan
[2001] ZACC 7	MEC for Local Government and Development Planning, Western Cape and Another v Paarl Poultry Enterprises CC t/a Rosendal Poultry Farm	6 November 2001	14 December 2001	Yacoob
[2001] ZACC 8	National Gambling Board v Premier of KwaZulu-Natal and Others	8 November 2001	21 December 2001	du Plessis (acting)
