= List of judgments of the Constitutional Court of South Africa delivered in 1998 =

The table below lists the judgments of the Constitutional Court of South Africa delivered in 1998.

The members of the court at the start of 1998 were President Arthur Chaskalson, Deputy President Pius Langa, and judges Lourens Ackermann, John Didcott, Richard Goldstone, Johann Kriegler, Tholie Madala, Yvonne Mokgoro, Kate O'Regan and Albie Sachs. The seat left vacant by the departure at the end of 1996 of Ismail Mahomed to head the Supreme Court of Appeal was filled in February by the appointment of Zak Yacoob. Justice Didcott died in October, and his seat was not filled until 1999.

Citation	Case name	Heard	Decided	Majority author
[1998] ZACC 1	City Council of Pretoria v Walker	19 August 1997	17 February 1998	Langa
[1998] ZACC 2	African National Congress and Another v Minister of Local Government and Housing, KwaZulu-Natal and Others	7 November 1997	24 March 1998	O'Regan
[1998] ZACC 3	Bruce and Another v Fleecytex Johannesburg CC and Others		24 March 1998	Chaskalson
[1998] ZACC 4	Oranje Vrystaatse Vereniging vir Staatsondersteunde Skole and Another v Premier of the Free State and Others		12 May 1998	Goldstone
[1998] ZACC 5	Wild and Another v Hoffert NO and Others	10 March 1998	12 May 1998	Kriegler
[1998] ZACC 6	De Lange v Smuts NO and Others	20 November 1997	28 May 1998	Ackermann
[1998] ZACC 7	S v Mello and Another		28 May 1998	Mokgoro
[1998] ZACC 8	S v Van Nell and Another		28 May 1998	Mokgoro
[1998] ZACC 9	MEC for Development Planning and Local Government, Gauteng v Democratic Party and Others	17 March 1998	29 May 1998	Yacoob
[1998] ZACC 10	Mistry v Interim National Medical and Dental Council and Others	24 February 1998	29 May 1998	Sachs
[1998] ZACC 11	Amod v Multilateral Motor Vehicle Accidents Fund	21 May 1998	27 August 1998	Chaskalson
[1998] ZACC 12	De Freitas and Another v Society of Advocates of Natal	21 May 1998	15 September 1998	Langa
[1998] ZACC 13	Fraser v Naude and Another		23 September 1998	Chaskalson
[1998] ZACC 14	Osman and Another v Attorney-General for the Transvaal	7 May 1998	23 September 1998	Madala
[1998] ZACC 15	National Coalition for Gay and Lesbian Equality and Another v Minister of Justice and Others	27 August 1998	9 October 1998	Ackermann
[1998] ZACC 16	Christian Education South Africa v Minister of Education		14 October 1998	Langa
[1998] ZACC 17	Fedsure Life Assurance Ltd and Others v Greater Johannesburg Transitional Metropolitan Council and Others	18–20 August 1998	14 October 1998	Chaskalson, Goldstone and O'Regan
[1998] ZACC 18	Jooste v Score Supermarket Trading (Pty) Ltd	10 November 1998	27 November 1998	Yacoob
[1998] ZACC 19	Beinash and Another v Ernst & Young and Others	8 September 1998	2 December 1998	Mokgoro
[1998] ZACC 20	Premier of Mpumalanga and Another v Executive Committee of the Association of Governing Bodies of State Aided Schools, Eastern Transvaal	3 November 1998	2 December 1998	O'Regan
[1998] ZACC 21	President of the Republic of South Africa and Others v South African Rugby Football Union and Others	24 November 1998	2 December 1998	Chaskalson
