= List of judgments of the Constitutional Court of South Africa delivered in 2013 =

The table below lists the judgments of the Constitutional Court of South Africa delivered in 2013.

The members of the court at the start of 2013 were Chief Justice Mogoeng Mogoeng, Deputy Chief Justice Dikgang Moseneke, and judges Edwin Cameron, Johan Froneman, Chris Jafta, Sisi Khampepe, Bess Nkabinde, Thembile Skweyiya, Johann van der Westhuizen, Zak Yacoob and Raymond Zondo. Justice Yacoob retired at the end of January and was replaced by the appointment of Mbuyiseli Madlanga in April.

Citation	Case name	Heard	Decided	Majority author
[2013] ZACC 1	Motswagae and Others v Rustenburg Local Municipality and Another	27 November 2012	7 February 2013	Yacoob
[2013] ZACC 2	National Director of Public Prosecutions v Elran	15 November 2012	19 February 2013	Cameron
[2013] ZACC 3	Pilane and Another v Pilane and Another	13 September 2012	28 February 2013	Skweyiya
[2013] ZACC 4	Ngewu and Another v Post Office Retirement Fund and Others	7 February 2013	7 March 2013	Van der Westhuizen
[2013] ZACC 5	Hattingh and Others v Juta	6 November 2012	14 March 2013	Zondo
[2013] ZACC 6	Kwalindile Community v King Sabata Dalinyebo Municipality and Others; Zimbane Community v King Sabata Dalinyebo Municipality and Others	13 November 2012	28 March 2013	Moseneke
[2013] ZACC 7	eThekwini Municipality v Ingonyama Trust	12 February 2013	28 March 2013	Jafta
[2013] ZACC 8	Houston v S		28 March 2013	The Court
[2013] ZACC 9	Agri South Africa v Minister for Minerals and Energy	8 November 2012	18 April 2013	Mogoeng
[2013] ZACC 10	KwaZulu-Natal Joint Liaison Committee v MEC for Education, KwaZulu-Natal and Others	22 November 2012	25 April 2013	Cameron
[2013] ZACC 11	Rademan v Moqhaka Local Municipality and Others	5 February 2013	26 April 2013	Zondo
[2013] ZACC 12	Justice Alliance of South Africa v Minister for Safety and Security and Others		21 May 2013	The Court
[2013] ZACC 13	Association of Regional Magistrates of Southern Africa v President of the Republic of South Africa and Others	19 February 2013	23 May 2013	Nkabinde
[2013] ZACC 14	Mayelane v Ngwenyama and Another	20 November 2012	30 May 2013	Froneman, Khampepe and Skweyiya
[2013] ZACC 15	Mpofu v Minister for Justice and Constitutional Development and Others	19 November 2012	6 June 2013	Skweyiya
[2013] ZACC 16	Liebenberg NO and Others v Bergrivier Municipality	12 March 2013	6 June 2013	Mhlantla (acting)
[2013] ZACC 17	Nabolisa v S	7 March 2013	12 June 2013	Jafta
[2013] ZACC 18	Sigcau v President of the Republic of South Africa and Others	21 February 2013	13 June 2013	The Court
[2013] ZACC 19	Tulip Diamonds FZE v Minister for Justice and Constitutional Development and Others	26 February 2013	13 June 2013	Van der Westhuizen
[2013] ZACC 20	Glenister v President of the Republic of South Africa and Others		14 June 2013	The Court
[2013] ZACC 21	Matladi obo Matladi Family v Greater Tubatse Local Municipality and Others		14 June 2013	The Court
[2013] ZACC 22	Government of the Republic of Zimbabwe v Fick and Others	28 February 2013	27 June 2013	Mogoeng
[2013] ZACC 23	Mukaddam v Pioneer Foods (Pty) Ltd and Others	7 May 2013	27 June 2013	Jafta
[2013] ZACC 24	Daniel v President of the Republic of South Africa and Another		27 June 2013	The Court
[2013] ZACC 25	Head of Department, Department of Education, Free State Province v Welkom High School and Another; Head of Department, Department of Education, Free State Province v Harmony High School and Another	5 March 2013	10 July 2013	Khampepe
[2013] ZACC 26	National Society for the Prevention of Cruelty to Animals v Minister of Agriculture, Forestry and Fisheries and Others	19 March 2013	11 July 2013	Zondo
[2013] ZACC 27	Magidiwana and Others v President of the Republic of South Africa and Others		19 August 2013	The Court
[2013] ZACC 28	Mazibuko v Sisulu and Another	28 March 2013	27 August 2013	Moseneke
[2013] ZACC 29	Coetzee v National Commissioner of Police and Another	21 May 2013	29 August 2013	Nkabinde
[2013] ZACC 30	Britannia Beach Estate (Pty) Ltd and Others v Saldanha Bay Municipality	28 May 2013	5 September 2013	Froneman
[2013] ZACC 31	Ka Mtuze v Bytes Technology Group South Africa (Pty) Ltd and Others		12 September 2013	The Court
[2013] ZACC 32	Mail and Guardian Media Ltd and Others v Chipu N.O. and Others	14 May 2013	27 September 2013	Zondo
[2013] ZACC 33	Minister of Police and Others v Premier of the Western Cape and Others	6 August 2013	1 October 2013	Moseneke
[2013] ZACC 34	MEC for Education in Gauteng Province and Others v Governing Body of Rivonia Primary School and Others	9 May 2013	3 October 2013	Mhlantla (acting)
[2013] ZACC 35	The Teddy Bear Clinic for Abused Children and Another v Minister of Justice and Constitutional Development and Another	30 May 2013	3 October 2013	Khampepe
[2013] ZACC 36	Food and Allied Workers Union v Ngcobo NO and Another	29 August 2013	9 October 2013	Cameron
[2013] ZACC 37	Grootboom v National Prosecuting Authority and Another	23 May 2013	21 October 2013	Bosielo (acting)
[2013] ZACC 38	Gaertner and Others v Minister of Finance and Others	12 September 2013	14 November 2013	Madlanga
[2013] ZACC 39	Minister of Local Government, Environmental Affairs and Development Planning of the Western Cape v Lagoonbay Lifestyle Estate (Pty) Ltd and Others	20 August 2013	20 November 2013	Mhlantla (acting)
[2013] ZACC 40	Mansingh v General Council of the Bar and Others	22 August 2013	28 November 2013	Nkabinde
[2013] ZACC 41	Minister of Justice and Constitutional Development and Another v Masingili and Others	27 August 2013	28 November 2013	Van der Westhuizen
[2013] ZACC 42	AllPay Consolidated Investment Holdings (Pty) Ltd and Others v Chief Executive Officer of the South African Social Security Agency and Others	10 September 2013	29 November 2013	Froneman
[2013] ZACC 43	Mbatha v University of Zululand	5 September 2013	5 December 2013	Cameron
[2013] ZACC 44	Minister of Communications v Ngewu and Others	7 November 2013	5 December 2013	Madlanga
[2013] ZACC 45	Minister of Mineral Resources and Others v Sishen Iron Ore Company (Pty) Ltd and Another	3 September 2013	12 December 2013	Jafta
[2013] ZACC 46	Ferris and Another v Firstrand Bank Limited and Another	5 November 2013	12 December 2013	Moseneke
[2013] ZACC 47	Director-General Department of Home Affairs and Another v Mukhamadiva		12 December 2013	Moseneke
[2013] ZACC 48	Dengetenge Holdings (Pty) Ltd v Southern Sphere Mining and Development Company Ltd and Others	15 August 2013	13 December 2013	Zondo
[2013] ZACC 49	Khumalo and Another v Member of the Executive Council for Education: KwaZulu Natal	8 August 2013	18 December 2013	Skweyiya
[2013] ZACC 50	Competition Commission of South Africa v Pioneer Hi-Bred International Inc and Others	4 November 2013	18 December 2013	Skweyiya
