= List of judgments of the Constitutional Court of South Africa delivered in 1996 =

The table below lists the judgments of the Constitutional Court of South Africa delivered in 1996.

The eleven members of the court during 1996 were President Arthur Chaskalson, Deputy President Ismail Mahomed, and judges Lourens Ackermann, John Didcott, Richard Goldstone, Johann Kriegler, Pius Langa, Tholie Madala, Yvonne Mokgoro, Kate O'Regan and Albie Sachs. Justice Goldstone was granted leave of absence to serve as chief prosecutor of the International Criminal Tribunal for the former Yugoslavia and the International Criminal Tribunal for Rwanda. His seat was filled over the court of the year by acting judges Sydney Kentridge, John Trengove and Bernard Ngoepe.

Citation	Case name	Heard	Decided	Majority author
[1996] ZACC 1	S v Mbatha; S v Prinsloo	16 November 1995	9 February 1996	Langa
[1996] ZACC 27	Ferreira v Levin NO and Others; Vryenhoek and Others v Powell NO and Others	9 May 1995	19 March 1996	Ackermann
[1996] ZACC 2	Bernstein and Others v Bester NO and Others	19 September 1995	27 March 1996	Ackermann
[1996] ZACC 3	In re: National Education Policy Bill No 83 of 1995	7 March 1996	3 April 1996	Chaskalson
[1996] ZACC 4	In re: Gauteng School Education Bill of 1995	29 February 1996	4 April 1996	Mahomed
[1996] ZACC 5	Luitingh v Minister of Defence	21 November 1995	4 April 1996	Didcott
[1996] ZACC 6	Nel v Le Roux NO and Others	20 February 1996	4 April 1996	Ackermann
[1996] ZACC 7	Case and Another v Minister of Safety and Security and Others; Curtis v Minister of Safety and Security and Others	5 September 1995	9 May 1996	Didcott
[1996] ZACC 8	Besserglik v Minister of Trade, Industry and Tourism and Others		14 May 1996	O'Regan
[1996] ZACC 9	Brink v Kitshoff NO	9 November 1995	15 May 1996	Chaskalson
[1996] ZACC 10	Du Plessis and Others v De Klerk and Another	7 November 1995	15 May 1996	Kentridge (acting)
[1996] ZACC 11	Gardener v Whitaker	15 November 1995	15 May 1996	Kentridge (acting)
[1996] ZACC 25	Key v Attorney-General, Cape Provincial Division and Another	23 May 1995	15 May 1996	Kriegler
[1996] ZACC 12	Ynuico Ltd v Minister of Trade and Industry and Others	12 March 1996	21 May 1996	Didcott
[1996] ZACC 13	Rudolph and Another v Commissioner for Inland Revenue and Others	28 May 1996	11 June 1996	Ackermann
[1996] ZACC 14	S v Julies		11 June 1996	Kriegler
[1996] ZACC 15	In re: KwaZulu-Natal Amakhosi and Iziphakanyiswa Amendment Bill of 1995; In re: Payment of Salaries, Allowances and Other Privileges to the Ingonyama Bill of 1995	21 May 1996	5 July 1996	Chaskalson
[1996] ZACC 16	Azanian Peoples Organization (AZAPO) and Others v President of the Republic of South Africa and Others	30 May 1996	25 July 1996	Mahomed
[1996] ZACC 17	Certification of the KwaZulu-Natal Constitution	25–27 June 1996	6 September 1996	The Court
[1996] ZACC 26	Certification of the Constitution of the Republic of South Africa, 1996	1–5 and 8–11 July 1996	6 September 1996	The Court
[1996] ZACC 18	Scagell and Others v Attorney-General, Western Cape and Others	5 March 1996	12 September 1996	O'Regan
[1996] ZACC 19	Tsotetsi v Mutual and Federal Insurance Company Ltd	29 August 1995 and 16 May 1996	12 September 1996	O'Regan
[1996] ZACC 20	Mohlomi v Minister of Defence	21 November 1995	26 September 1996	Didcott
[1996] ZACC 21	S v Bequinot	25 September 1996	18 November 1996	Kriegler
[1996] ZACC 22	Transvaal Agricultural Union v Minister of Land Affairs and Another	19 September 1996	18 November 1996	Chaskalson
[1996] ZACC 23	JT Publishing (Pty) Ltd and Another v Minister of Safety and Security and Others	14 May 1996	21 November 1996	Didcott
[1996] ZACC 24	Certification of the Amended Text of the Constitution of the Republic of South Africa, 1996	18–20 November 1996	4 December 1996	The Court
