= List of judgments of the Constitutional Court of South Africa delivered in 2008 =

The table below lists the judgments of the Constitutional Court of South Africa delivered in 2008.

The members of the court at the start of 2008 were Chief Justice Pius Langa, Deputy Chief Justice Dikgang Moseneke, and judges Tholie Madala, Yvonne Mokgoro, Sandile Ngcobo, Bess Nkabinde, Kate O'Regan, Albie Sachs, Thembile Skweyiya, Johann van der Westhuizen and Zak Yacoob. Justice Madala retired in October and Edwin Cameron was appointed in his place.

Citation	Case name	Heard	Decided	Majority author
[2008] ZACC 1	Occupiers of 51 Olivia Road, Berea Township and 197 Main Street, Johannesburg v City of Johannesburg and Others	28 August 2007	19 February 2008	Yacoob
[2008] ZACC 2	S v Molimi	23 August 2007	4 March 2008	Nkabinde
[2008] ZACC 3	Zealand v Minister of Justice and Constitutional Development and Another	15 November 2007	11 March 2008	Langa
[2008] ZACC 4	Njongi v MEC for Welfare, Eastern Cape	6 November 2007	28 March 2008	Yacoob
[2008] ZACC 5	Mphela and Others v Haakdoornbult Boerdery CC and Others	8 November 2007	8 May 2008	Mpati (acting)
[2008] ZACC 6	Independent Newspapers (Pty) Ltd v Minister for Intelligence Services, in re: Masetlha v President of the Republic of South Africa and Another	22 November 2007	22 May 2008	Moseneke
[2008] ZACC 7	S v Shaik and Others	26 February 2008	29 May 2008	O'Regan
[2008] ZACC 8	Nyathi v MEC for Health, Gauteng and Another	30 August 2007	2 June 2008	Madala
[2008] ZACC 9	Shilubana and Others v Nwamitwa	27 November 2007	4 June 2008	Van der Westhuizen
[2008] ZACC 10	Merafong Demarcation Forum and Others v President of the Republic of South Africa and Others	20 September 2007	13 June 2008	Van der Westhuizen
[2008] ZACC 11	Walele v City of Cape Town and Others	21 February 2008	13 June 2008	Jafta (acting)
[2008] ZACC 12	Wary Holdings (Pty) Ltd v Stalwo (Pty) Ltd and Another	4 March 2008	25 July 2008	Kroon (acting)
[2008] ZACC 13	Thint (Pty) Ltd v National Director of Public Prosecutions and Others; Zuma and Another v National Director of Public Prosecutions and Others	11–13 March 2008	31 July 2008	Langa
[2008] ZACC 14	Thint Holdings (Southern Africa) (Pty) Ltd and Another v National Director of Public Prosecutions; Zuma v National Director of Public Prosecutions	11–13 March 2008	31 July 2008	The Court
[2008] ZACC 15	CUSA v Tao Ying Metal Industries and Others	28 February 2008	18 December 2008	Ngcobo
[2008] ZACC 16	Equity Aviation Services (Pty) Ltd v Commission for Conciliation, Mediation and Arbitration and Others	6 May 2008	25 September 2008	Nkabinde
[2008] ZACC 17	Kruger v President of the Republic of South Africa and Others	19 February 2008	2 October 2008	Skweyiya
[2008] ZACC 18	Lekolwane and Another v Minister of Justice and Constitutional Development		3 October 2008	The Court
[2008] ZACC 19	Glenister v President of the Republic of South Africa and Others	20 August 2008	22 October 2008	Langa
[2008] ZACC 20	Weare and Another v Ndebele NO and Others	19 August 2008	18 November 2008	Van der Westhuizen
[2008] ZACC 21	Geldenhuys v National Director of Public Prosecutions and Others	28 August 2008	26 November 2008	Mokgoro
[2008] ZACC 22	Chagi and Others v Special Investigating Unit	15 May 2008	3 December 2008	Yacoob
[2008] ZACC 23	Gumede v President of the Republic of South Africa and Others	11 September 2008	8 December 2008	Moseneke
