= List of judgments of the Constitutional Court of South Africa delivered in 2007 =

The table below lists the judgments of the Constitutional Court of South Africa delivered in 2007.

The members of the court during 2007 were Chief Justice Pius Langa, Deputy Chief Justice Dikgang Moseneke, and judges Tholie Madala, Yvonne Mokgoro, Sandile Ngcobo, Bess Nkabinde, Kate O'Regan, Albie Sachs, Thembile Skweyiya, Johann van der Westhuizen, and Zak Yacoob.

Citation	Case name	Heard	Decided	Majority author
[2007] ZACC 1	Engelbrecht v Road Accident Fund and Another	2 November 2006	6 March 2007	Kondile (acting)
[2007] ZACC 2	Crown Restaurant CC v Gold Reef City Theme Park (Pty) Ltd		6 March 2007	The Court
[2007] ZACC 3	S v Shinga; S v O'Connell and Others	14 November 2006	8 March 2007	Yacoob
[2007] ZACC 4	Mohunram and Another v National Director of Public Prosecutions and Another	16 November 2006	26 March 2007	Moseneke
[2007] ZACC 5	Barkhuizen v Napier	4 May 2006	4 April 2007	Ngcobo
[2007] ZACC 6	NM and Others v Smith and Others	9 May 2006	4 April 2007	Madala
[2007] ZACC 7	Road Accident Fund v Mdeyide	27 February 2007	4 April 2007	Navsa (acting)
[2007] ZACC 8	University of Witwatersrand Law Clinic v Minister of Home Affairs and Another		11 April 2007	The Court
[2007] ZACC 9	Masiya v Director of Public Prosecutions (Pretoria) and Another	9 November 2006	10 May 2007	Nkabinde
[2007] ZACC 14	Shilubana and Others v Nwamitwa (postponement)	17 May 2007	8 June 2007	Van der Westhuizen
[2007] ZACC 10	South African National Defence Union v Minister of Defence and Others	1 March 2007	30 May 2007	O'Regan
[2007] ZACC 11	Van Vuren v Minister of Justice and Constitutional Development and Another		1 June 2007	The Court
[2007] ZACC 12	Department of Land Affairs and Others v Goedgelegen Tropical Fruits (Pty) Ltd	8 March 2007	6 June 2007	Moseneke
[2007] ZACC 13	Fuel Retailers Association of Southern Africa v Director-General: Environmental Management, Department of Agriculture, Conservation and Environment, Mpumalanga and Others	6 March 2007	7 June 2007	Ngcobo
[2007] ZACC 15	Minister of Safety and Security v Van Niekerk	3 May 2007	8 June 2007	Sachs
[2007] ZACC 16	Van Der Merwe and Another v Taylor NO and Others	21 November 2006	14 September 2007	Moseneke and Nkabinde
[2007] ZACC 17	Armbruster and Another v Minister of Finance and Others	21 November 2006	25 September 2007	Mokgoro
[2007] ZACC 18	S v M	22 February 2007	26 September 2007	Sachs
[2007] ZACC 19	S v Shaik and Others	23–24 May 2007	2 October 2007	The Court
[2007] ZACC 20	Masetlha v President of the Republic of South Africa and Another	10 May 2007	3 October 2007	Moseneke
[2007] ZACC 21	MEC for Education, KwaZulu-Natal and Others v Pillay	20 February 2007	5 October 2007	Langa
[2007] ZACC 22	Sidumo and Another v Rustenburg Platinum Mines Ltd and Others	8 May 2007	5 October 2007	Navsa (acting)
[2007] ZACC 23	Chirwa v Transnet Limited and Others	13 March 2007	28 November 2007	Skweyiya
[2007] ZACC 24	Van Wyk v Unitas Hospital and Another		6 December 2007	The Court
[2007] ZACC 25	MEC for Agriculture, Conservation and Environment, Gauteng and Another v HTF Developers (Pty) Ltd	6 September 2007	6 December 2007	Skweyiya
[2007] ZACC 26	Islamic Unity Convention v Minister of Telecommunications and Others	11 September 2007	7 December 2007	Mpati (acting)
[2007] ZACC 27	AD and Another v DW and Others	18 September 2007	7 December 2007	Sachs
