= List of judgments of the Constitutional Court of South Africa delivered in 2018 =

The table below lists the judgments of the Constitutional Court of South Africa delivered in 2018.

The members of the court at the start of 2018 were Chief Justice Mogoeng Mogoeng, Deputy Chief Justice Raymond Zondo, and judges Edwin Cameron, Johan Froneman, Chris Jafta, Sisi Khampepe, Mbuyiseli Madlanga, Nonkosi Mhlantla and Leona Theron. There were two vacancies. Azhar Cachalia, Daniel Dlodlo, Patricia Goliath, Fayeeza Kathree-Setiloane, Jody Kollapen, Xola Petse and Dumisani Zondi sat as acting judges on judgments delivered in this year.

Citation	Case name	Heard	Decided	Majority author
[2018] ZACC 1	Zungu v Premier of the Province of KwaZulu-Natal and Others		22 January 2018	Mhlantla
[2018] ZACC 2	Loni v Member of the Executive Council, Department of Health, Eastern Cape, Bhisho		22 February 2018	The Court
[2018] ZACC 3	S v Okah	28 November 2017	23 February 2018	Cameron
[2018] ZACC 4	September and Others v CMI Business Enterprise CC	10 August 2017	27 February 2018	Theron
[2018] ZACC 5	S S v V V-S	29 August 2017, 8 November 2017	1 March 2018	Kollapen (acting)
[2018] ZACC 6	Klaas v S		15 March 2018	Mhlantla
[2018] ZACC 7	Food and Allied Workers Union obo Gaoshubelwe v Pieman's Pantry (Pty) Limited	3 August 2017	20 March 2018	Kollapen (acting)
[2018] ZACC 8	Helen Suzman Foundation v Judicial Service Commission	31 August 2017	24 April 2018	Madlanga
[2018] ZACC 9	Saidi and Others v Minister of Home Affairs and Others	21 November 2017	24 April 2018	Madlanga
[2018] ZACC 10	Pretorius and Another v Transport Pension Fund and Others	16 November 2017	25 April 2018	Froneman
[2018] ZACC 11	Marshall and Others v Commissioner for the South Africa Revenue Service		25 April 2018	Froneman
[2018] ZACC 12	Conradie v S		25 April 2018	Froneman
[2018] ZACC 13	Rustenburg Platinum Mine v SAEWA obo Bester and Others	9 November 2017	17 May 2018	Theron
[2018] ZACC 14	Minister of Safety and Security v South African Hunters and Game Conservation Association	7 February 2018	7 June 2018	Froneman
[2018] ZACC 15	City of Johannesburg Metropolitan Municipality v Chairman of the National Building Regulations Review Board and Others	27 February 2018	7 June 2018	Jafta
[2018] ZACC 16	Levenstein and Others v Estate of the Late Sidney Lewis Frankel and Others	14 November 2017	14 June 2018	Zondi (acting)
[2018] ZACC 17	My Vote Counts NPC v Minister of Justice and Correctional Services and Another	13 March 2018	21 June 2018	Mogoeng
[2018] ZACC 18	Booysen v Minister of Safety and Security	22 August 2017	27 June 2018	Mhlantla
[2018] ZACC 19	Moosa NO and Others v Minister of Justice and Correctional Services and Others		29 June 2018	Cachalia (acting)
[2018] ZACC 20	Minister of Justice and Constitutional Development and Another v South African Restructuring and Insolvency Practitioners Association and Others	2 November 2017	5 July 2018	Jafta
[2018] ZACC 21	Department of Transport and Others v Tasima (Pty) Limited; Tasima (Pty) Limited and Others v Road Traffic Management Corporation and Others	8 March 2018	17 July 2018	Petse (acting)
[2018] ZACC 22	Assign Services (Pty) Limited v National Union of Metalworkers of South Africa and Others	22 February 2018	26 July 2018	Dlodlo (acting)
[2018] ZACC 23	Corruption Watch NPC and Others v President of the Republic of South Africa and Others; Nxasana v Corruption Watch NPC and Others	28 February 2018	13 August 2018	Madlanga
[2018] ZACC 24	Police and Prisons Civil Rights Union v South African Correctional Services Workers' Union and Others	15 February 2018	23 August 2018	Jafta
[2018] ZACC 25	Liesching and Others v S	24 August 2017	29 August 2018	Theron
[2018] ZACC 26	South African Social Security Agency and Another v Minister of Social Development and Others	6 March 2018	30 August 2018	Jafta
[2018] ZACC 27	M T v S; A S B v S; September v S	10 May 2018	3 September 2018	Dlodlo (acting)
[2018] ZACC 28	Sigcau and Another v Minister of Cooperative Governance and Traditional Affairs and Others	20 February 2018	11 September 2018	Zondo
[2018] ZACC 29	Duncanmec (Pty) Limited v Gaylard N.O. and Others	31 May 2018	13 September 2018	Jafta
[2018] ZACC 30	Minister of Justice and Constitutional Development and Others v Prince; National Director of Public Prosecutions and Others v Rubin; National Director of Public Prosecutions and Others v Acton and Others	7 November 2017	18 September 2018	Zondo
[2018] ZACC 31	Hunter v Financial Sector Conduct Authority and Others	13 February 2018	20 September 2018	Khampepe
[2018] ZACC 32	Morudi and Others v NC Housing Services and Development Co Limited and Others	8 May 2018	25 September 2018	Khampepe
[2018] ZACC 33	Airports Company South Africa v Big Five Duty Free (Pty) Limited and Others	22 May 2018	27 September 2018	Froneman
[2018] ZACC 34	Thwala v S		27 September 2018	Froneman
[2018] ZACC 35	Tarr v S		27 September 2018	Froneman
[2018] ZACC 36	Black Sash Trust v Minister of Social Development and Others		27 September 2018	Froneman
[2018] ZACC 37	S.O.S Support Public Broadcasting Coalition and Others v South African Broadcasting Corporation (SOC) Limited and Others	23 November 2017	28 September 2018	Kathree-Setiloane
[2018] ZACC 38	Gavrić v Refugee Status Determination Officer, Cape Town and Others	6 February 2018	28 September 2018	Theron
[2018] ZACC 39	Ahmed and Others v Minister of Home Affairs and Another	15 May 2018	9 October 2018	Theron
[2018] ZACC 40	Holomisa v Holomisa and Another	14 August 2018	23 October 2018	Froneman
[2018] ZACC 41	Maledu and Others v Itereleng Bakgatla Mineral Resources (Pty) Limited and Another	24 May 2018	25 October 2018	Petse
[2018] ZACC 42	Rahube v Rahube and Others	17 May 2018	30 October 2018	Goliath
[2018] ZACC 43	eThekwini Municipality v Mounthaven (Pty) Limited	28 August 2018	31 October 2018	Froneman
[2018] ZACC 44	South African Commercial, Catering and Allied Workers Union and Others v Woolworths (Pty) Limited	29 May 2018	6 November 2018	Khampepe
[2018] ZACC 45	Mlungwana and Others v S and Another	21 August 2018	19 November 2018	Petse
[2018] ZACC 46	Electoral Commission of South Africa v Speaker of the National Assembly and Others	29 August 2018	22 November 2018	Cameron
[2018] ZACC 47	Amardien and Others v Registrar of Deeds and Others	7 August 2018	28 November 2018	Mhlantla
[2018] ZACC 48	Diener NO v Minister of Justice and Correctional Services and Others	6 September 2018	29 November 2018	Khampepe
[2018] ZACC 49	South African Veterinary Association v Speaker of the National Assembly and Others	11 September 2018	5 December 2018	Goliath
[2018] ZACC 50	Mkhize NO v Premier of the Province of KwaZulu-Natal and Others	2 August 2018	6 December 2018	Dlodlo
[2018] ZACC 51	Law Society of South Africa and Others v President of the Republic of South Africa and Others	30 September 2018	11 December 2018	Mogoeng
[2018] ZACC 52	Ruta v Minister of Home Affairs	1 November 2018	20 December 2018	Cameron
