= List of Constitutional Court opinions of Pius Langa =

Pius Langa served in the Constitutional Court of South Africa from its inception in 1995 until his retirement in 2009. He was the Chief Justice of South Africa from 2005 to 2009.

== Majority opinions ==
No.	Case name	Citation	Notes
1	S v Williams and Others	[1995] ZACC 6	
2	S v Mbatha; S v Prinsloo	[1996] ZACC 1	
3	S v Coetzee and Others	[1997] ZACC 2	
4	City Council of Pretoria v Walker	[1998] ZACC 1	
5	De Freitas and Another v Society of Advocates of Natal	[1998] ZACC 12	
6	Christian Education South Africa v Minister of Education	[1998] ZACC 16	
7	President of the Ordinary Court Martial v Freedom of Expression Institute	[1999] ZACC 10	
8	Cape Metropolitan Council v Minister of Provincial Affairs and Constitutional Development	[1999] ZACC 12	
9	Investigating Directorate: Serious Economic Offences v Hyundai Motors	[2000] ZACC 12	
10	S v Boesak	[2000] ZACC 25	
11	In re: Constitutionality of the Mpumalanga Petitions Bill, 2000	[2001] ZACC 10	
12	Islamic Unity Convention v Independent Broadcasting Authority	[2002] ZACC 3	
13	Van der Spuy v General Council of the Bar of South Africa	[2002] ZACC 17	
14	Democratic Alliance v Masondo	[2002] ZACC 28	
15	De Reuck v Director of Public Prosecutions (Witwatersrand Local Division)	[2003] ZACC 19	
16	Bhe v Magistrate, Khayelitsha	[2004] ZACC 17	
17	President v Modderklip Boerdery	[2005] ZACC 5	
18	Phumelela Gaming and Leisure Limited v Gründlingh	[2006] ZACC 6	
19	SABC v National Director of Public Prosecutions	[2006] ZACC 15	Co-written with Kondile, Madala, Nkabinde, O'Regan, Van Heerden and Yacoob.
20	Minister of Safety and Security v Luiters	[2006] ZACC 21	
21	MEC for Education, KwaZulu-Natal v Pillay	[2007] ZACC 21	
22	Zealand v Minister of Justice and Constitutional Development	[2008] ZACC 3	
23	Thint v National Director of Public Prosecutions	[2008] ZACC 13	
24	Glenister v President	[2008] ZACC 19	
25	Du Toit v Minister for Safety and Security	[2009] ZACC 22	
26	Minister for Justice and Constitutional Development v Chonco	[2009] ZACC 25	
