= List of judgments of the Constitutional Court of South Africa delivered in 1999 =

The table below lists the judgments of the Constitutional Court of South Africa delivered in 1999.

The members of the court at the start of 1999 were President Arthur Chaskalson, Deputy President Pius Langa, and judges Lourens Ackermann, Richard Goldstone, Johann Kriegler, Tholie Madala, Yvonne Mokgoro, Kate O'Regan, Albie Sachs and Zak Yacoob. The seat left vacant by the death of John Didcott in October 1998 was filled in August by the appointment of Sandile Ngcobo.

Citation	Case name	Heard	Decided	Majority author
[1999] ZACC 1	Mphahlele v First National Bank of South Africa Ltd		1 March 1999	Goldstone
[1999] ZACC 2	Premier of the Western Cape v President of the Republic of South Africa and Another	23 February 1999	29 March 1999	Chaskalson
[1999] ZACC 3	August and Another v Electoral Commission and Others	19 March 1999	1 April 1999	Sachs
[1999] ZACC 4	Democratic Party v Minister of Home Affairs and Another	29 March 1999	13 April 1999	Goldstone
[1999] ZACC 5	New National Party v Government of the Republic of South Africa and Others	15–16 March 1999	13 April 1999	Yacoob
[1999] ZACC 7	South African National Defence Union v Minister of Defence and Another	25 March 1999	26 May 1999	O'Regan
[1999] ZACC 8	S v Dlamini; S v Dladla and Others; S v Joubert; S v Schietekat	18 February and 10 March 1999	3 June 1999	Kriegler
[1999] ZACC 9	President of the Republic of South Africa and Others v South African Rugby Football Union and Others (recusal application)	4–6 May 1999	4 June 1999	The Court
[1999] ZACC 10	President of the Ordinary Court Martial and Others v Freedom of Expression Institute and Others	25 May 1999	24 August 1999	Langa
[1999] ZACC 6	Premier of the Western Cape and Another v Electoral Commission and Another	26 May 1999	2 September 1999	Mokgoro
[1999] ZACC 11	President of the Republic of South Africa and Others v South African Rugby Football Union and Others	7 and 10–13 May 1999	10 September 1999	The Court
[1999] ZACC 12	Cape Metropolitan Council v Minister of Provincial Affairs and Constitutional Development and Another		15 October 1999	Langa
[1999] ZACC 13	Executive Council of the Western Cape v Minister for Provincial Affairs and Constitutional Development and Another; Executive Council of KwaZulu-Natal v President of the Republic of South Africa and Others	24–25 August 1999	15 October 1999	Ngcobo
[1999] ZACC 14	S v Manyonyo		4 November 1999	Chaskalson
[1999] ZACC 15	In re: Constitutionality of the Liquor Bill	31 August 1999	11 November 1999	Cameron (acting)
[1999] ZACC 16	Lesapo v North West Agricultural Bank and Another	14 September 1999	16 November 1999	Mokgoro
[1999] ZACC 17	National Coalition for Gay and Lesbian Equality and Others v Minister of Home Affairs and Others	17 August 1999	2 December 1999	Ackermann
[1999] ZACC 18	S v Twala	16 November 1999	2 December 1999	Yacoob
[1999] ZACC 19	S v Baloyi	9 November 1999	3 December 1999	Sachs
