= List of judgments of the Constitutional Court of South Africa delivered in 2016 =

The table below lists the judgments of the Constitutional Court of South Africa delivered in 2016.

The members of the court at the start of 2016 were Chief Justice Mogoeng Mogoeng, Deputy Chief Justice Dikgang Moseneke, and judges Edwin Cameron, Johan Froneman, Chris Jafta, Sisi Khampepe, Mbuyiseli Madlanga, Nonkosi Mhlantla, Bess Nkabinde, Johann van der Westhuizen and Raymond Zondo. Deputy Chief Justice Moseneke retired in May and Justice Nkabinde was appointed as Acting DCJ. Ronnie Bosielo, Elias Matojane, Boissie Mbha, Cagney Musi, Robert Nugent and Malcolm Wallis sat as acting judges on judgments delivered in this year.

Citation	Case name	Heard	Decided	Majority author
[2016] ZACC 1	Steenkamp and Others v Edcon Limited	8 September 2015	22 January 2016	Zondo
[2016] ZACC 2	Tronox KZN Sands (Pty) Ltd v KwaZulu-Natal Planning and Development Appeal Tribunal and Others	9 November 2015	29 January 2016	Van der Westhuizen
[2016] ZACC 3	Minister of Home Affairs v Rahim and Others	26 November 2015	18 February 2016	Nugent (acting)
[2016] ZACC 4	Minister for Environmental Affairs and Another v Aquarius Platinum (SA) (Pty) Ltd and Others	17 November 2015	23 February 2016	Jafta
[2016] ZACC 5	Pitje v Shibambo and Others	No hearing	25 February 2016	Nkabinde
[2016] ZACC 6	Molusi and Others v Voges N.O. and Others	12 November 2015	1 March 2016	Nkabinde
[2016] ZACC 7	Transport and Allied Workers Union of South Africa v PUTCO Limited	10 November 2015	8 March 2016	Khampepe
[2016] ZACC 8	Democratic Alliance v Speaker of the National Assembly and Others	5 November 2015	18 March 2016	Madlanga
[2016] ZACC 9	Provincial Government North West and Another v Tsoga Developers CC and Others	29 September 2015	24 March 2016	Madlanga
[2016] ZACC 10	Links v Member of the Executive Council, Department of Health, Northern Cape Province	25 August 2015	30 March 2016	Zondo
[2016] ZACC 11	Economic Freedom Fighters v Speaker of the National Assembly and Others; Democratic Alliance v Speaker of the National Assembly and Others	9 February 2015	31 March 2016	Mogoeng
[2016] ZACC 12	Nkata v Firstrand Bank Limited and Others	19 November 2015	21 April 2016	Cameron
[2016] ZACC 13	Makate v Vodacom (Pty) Ltd	1 September 2015	26 April 2016	Jafta
[2016] ZACC 14	Federation of Governing Bodies for South African Schools (FEDSAS) v Member of the Executive Council for Education, Gauteng and Another	5 May 2016	20 May 2016	Moseneke
[2016] ZACC 15	Electoral Commission v Mhlope and Others	9 May 2016	14 June 2016	Mogoeng
[2016] ZACC 16	Member of the Executive Council for Health, Gauteng v Lushaba		23 June 2016	Jafta
[2016] ZACC 17	Klaase and Another v van der Merwe N.O. and Others	3 September 2015	14 July 2016	Matojane (acting)
[2016] ZACC 18	Solidarity and Others v Department of Correctional Services and Others	18 November 2015	15 July 2016	Zondo
[2016] ZACC 19	City of Tshwane Metropolitan Municipality v Afriforum and Another	19 May 2016	21 July 2016	Mogoeng
[2016] ZACC 20	Pheko and Others v Ekurhuleni Metropolitan Municipality and Others (No 3)		26 July 2016	Nkabinde
[2016] ZACC 21	Minister of Police and Others v Kunjana	12 May 2016	27 July 2016	Mhlantla
[2016] ZACC 22	Land Access Movement of South Africa and Others v Chairperson of the National Council of Provinces and Others	16 February 2016	28 July 2016	Madlanga
[2016] ZACC 23	Baliso v Firstrand Bank Limited t/a Wesbank	8 March 2016	4 August 2016	Froneman
[2016] ZACC 24	Raduvha v Minister of Safety and Security and Another	25 February 2016	11 August 2016	Bosielo (acting)
[2016] ZACC 25	Nkabinde and Another v Judicial Service Commission and Others		24 August 2016	The Court
[2016] ZACC 26	Minister of Agriculture, Forestry and Fisheries v National Society for the Prevention of Cruelty to Animals		25 August 2016	The Court
[2016] ZACC 27	Jimmale and Another v S		30 August 2016	Nkabinde
[2016] ZACC 28	Transport and Allied Workers Union of South Africa obo Ngedle and Others v Unitrans Fuel and Chemical (Pty) Ltd Limited	23 February 2016	1 September 2016	Zondo
[2016] ZACC 29	Ndleve v Pretoria Society of Advocates		1 September 2016	The Court
[2016] ZACC 30	McBride v Minister of Police and Another	17 May 2016	6 September 2016	Bosielo (acting)
[2016] ZACC 31	Ngomane and Others v Govan Mbeki Municipality		8 September 2016	The Court
[2016] ZACC 32	University of Stellenbosch Legal Aid Clinic and Others v Minister of Justice and Correctional Services and Others; Association of Debt Recovery Agents NPC v University of Stellenbosch Legal Aid Clinic and Others; Mavava Trading 279 (Pty) Ltd and Others v University of Stellenbosch Legal Aid Clinic and Others	3 March 2016	13 September 2016	Cameron and Zondo
[2016] ZACC 33	Gbenga-Oluwatoye v Reckitt Benckiser South Africa (Pty) Limited and Another		15 September 2016	Moseneke and Cameron
[2016] ZACC 34	Absa Bank Limited v Moore and Another	2 August 2016	21 October 2016	Cameron
[2016] ZACC 35	Merafong City Local Municipality v AngloGold Ashanti Limited	18 February 2016	24 October 2016	Cameron
[2016] ZACC 36	Wickham v Magistrate, Stellenbosch and Others		25 October 2016	The Court
[2016] ZACC 37	Rural Maintenance (Pty) Limited and Another v Maluti-A-Phofung Local Municipality	3 May 2016	1 November 2016	Froneman
[2016] ZACC 38	South African Revenue Service v Commission for Conciliation, Mediation and Arbitration and Others	11 August 2016	8 November 2016	Mogoeng
[2016] ZACC 39	Department of Transport and Others v Tasima (Pty) Limited	24 May 2016	9 November 2016	Khampepe
[2016] ZACC 40	Pieterse N.O. and Another v Lephalale Local Municipality and Others		10 November 2016	The Court
[2016] ZACC 41	Liesching and Others v S and Another	6 September 2016	15 November 2016	Musi (acting)
[2016] ZACC 42	Masstores (Pty) Limited v Pick n Pay Retailers (Pty) Limited	30 August 2016	25 November 2016	Froneman
[2016] ZACC 43	AB and Another v Minister of Social Development	1 March 2016	29 November 2016	Nkabinde
[2016] ZACC 44	Laubscher N.O. v Duplan and Another	18 August 2016	30 November 2016	Mbha (acting)
[2016] ZACC 45	Lawyers for Human Rights v Minister in the Presidency and Others		1 December 2016	The Court
[2016] ZACC 46	National Society for the Prevention of Cruelty to Animals v Minister of Justice and Constitutional Development and Another	23 August 2016	8 December 2016	Khampepe
[2016] ZACC 47	Tshivhulana Royal Family v Netshivhulana	1 November 2016	14 December 2016	Musi (acting)
[2016] ZACC 48	Psychological Society of South Africa v Qwelane and Others		14 December 2016	The Court
[2016] ZACC 49	Myathaza v Johannesburg Metropolitan Bus Services (SOC) Limited t/a Metrobus and Others	1 September 2016	15 December 2016	Jafta, Froneman and Zondo
[2016] ZACC 50	Schoombee and Another v S		15 December 2016	The Court
[2016] ZACC 51	Areva NP v Eskom Holdings SOC Limited and Another	18 May 2016	21 December 2016	Zondo
[2016] ZACC 52	Snyders and Others v de Jager (interim relief)		21 December 2016	Zondo
[2016] ZACC 53	Snyders and Others v de Jager (contempt of court)	2 February 2016	21 December 2016	Zondo
[2016] ZACC 54	Snyders and Others v de Jager (joinder)	2 February 2016	21 December 2016	Zondo
[2016] ZACC 55	Snyders and Others v de Jager and Others (appeal)	2 February 2016	21 December 2016	Zondo
