= List of judgments of the Constitutional Court of South Africa delivered in 2017 =

The table below lists the judgments of the Constitutional Court of South Africa delivered in 2017.

The members of the court at the start of 2017 were Chief Justice Mogoeng Mogoeng and judges Edwin Cameron, Johan Froneman, Chris Jafta, Sisi Khampepe, Mbuyiseli Madlanga, Nonkosi Mhlantla, Bess Nkabinde and Raymond Zondo. There were two vacancies following the retirement in 2016 of Deputy Chief Justice Dikgang Moseneke and Johann van der Westhuizen. In June, Raymond Zondo was elevated to the position of Deputy Chief Justice, and in July Leona Theron was appointed to the court. Bess Nkabinde retired at the end of the year. Fayeeza Kathree-Setiloane, Jody Kollapen, Boissie Mbha, Phineas Mojapelo, Cagney Musi, Cynthia Pretorius and Dumisani Zondi sat as acting judges on judgments delivered in this year.

Citation	Case name	Heard	Decided	Majority author
[2017] ZACC 1	Ekurhuleni Metropolitan Municipality v Germiston Municipal Retirement Fund	16 August 2016	17 January 2017	Nkabinde
[2017] ZACC 2	The Business Zone 1010 CC t/a Emmarentia Convenience Centre v Engen Petroleum Limited and Others	24 August 2016	9 February 2017	Mhlantla
[2017] ZACC 3	Association of Mineworkers and Construction Union and Others v Chamber of Mines of South Africa and Others	24 November 2016	21 February 2017	Cameron
[2017] ZACC 4	South African Riding for the Disabled Association v Regional Land Claims Commissioner and Others		23 February 2017	Jafta
[2017] ZACC 5	City of Cape Town v Aurecon South Africa (Pty) Ltd	3 November 2016	24 February 2017	Mbha (acting)
[2017] ZACC 6	Mogaila v Coca Cola Fortune (Pty) Limited		2 March 2017	The Court
[2017] ZACC 7	South African Municipal Workers' Union v Minister of Co-Operative Governance & Traditional Affairs and Others	10 November 2016	9 March 2017	Khampepe
[2017] ZACC 8	Black Sash Trust v Minister of Social Development and Others	15 March 2017	17 March 2017	Froneman
[2017] ZACC 9	National Union of Metalworkers of South Africa obo M Fohlisa and 41 Others v Hendor Mining Supplies (a division of Marschalk Beleggings (Pty) Ltd)	8 September 2016	30 March 2017	Madlanga
[2017] ZACC 10	Hotz and Others v University of Cape Town		12 April 2017	The Court
[2017] ZACC 11	Department of Home Affairs v Public Servants Association and Others	28 February 2017	4 May 2017	Froneman
[2017] ZACC 12	Mamahule Communal Property Association and Others v Minister of Rural Development and Land Reform		5 May 2017	The Court
[2017] ZACC 13	Daniels v Scribante and Another	17 November 2016	11 May 2017	Madlanga
[2017] ZACC 14	Limpopo Legal Solutions and Others v Vhembe District Municipality and Others		18 May 2017	The Court
[2017] ZACC 15	Off-Beat Holiday Club and Another v Sanbonani Holiday Spa Shareblock Limited and Others	29 November 2016	23 May 2017	Mhlantla
[2017] ZACC 16	Genesis Medical Scheme v Registrar of Medical Schemes and Another	7 February 2017	6 June 2017	Cameron
[2017] ZACC 17	Electronic Media Network Limited and Others v e.tv (Pty) Limited and Others	21 February 2017	8 June 2017	Mogoeng
[2017] ZACC 18	Occupiers of Erven 87 and 88 Berea v De Wet N.O. and Another	14 February 2017	8 June 2017	Mojapelo (acting)
[2017] ZACC 19	Ndlovu v S	23 February 2017	15 June 2017	Khampepe
[2017] ZACC 20	Black Sash Trust v Minister of Social Development and Others		15 June 2017	Froneman
[2017] ZACC 21	United Democratic Movement v Speaker of the National Assembly and Others	15 May 2017	22 June 2017	Mogoeng
[2017] ZACC 22	Lawyers for Human Rights v Minister of Home Affairs and Others	14 March 2017	29 June 2017	Jafta
[2017] ZACC 23	Swart v Starbuck and Others		29 June 2017	Khampepe
[2017] ZACC 24	Baron and Others v Claytile (Pty) Limited and Another	23 March 2017	13 July 2017	Pretorius (acting)
[2017] ZACC 25	Mokone v Tassos Properties CC and Another	9 March 2017	24 July 2017	Madlanga
[2017] ZACC 26	South African Diamond Producers Organisation v Minister of Minerals and Energy N.O. and Others	11 May 2017	24 July 2017	Khampepe
[2017] ZACC 27	Barlow v S	7 March 2017	3 August 2017	Froneman
[2017] ZACC 28	Snyders NO v Louistef (Pty) Ltd and Another		3 August 2017	The Court
[2017] ZACC 29	Khanye and Another v S		10 August 2017	Mhlantla
[2017] ZACC 30	Limpopo Legal Solutions v Vhembe District Municipality and Others		17 August 2017	Zondo
[2017] ZACC 31	Jordaan and Others v City of Tshwane Metropolitan Municipality and Others; City of Tshwane Metropolitan Municipality v New Ventures Consulting and Services (Pty) Limited and Others; Ekurhuleni Metropolitan Municipality v Livanos and Others	23 May 2017	29 August 2017	Cameron
[2017] ZACC 32	Trinity Asset Management (Pty) Limited v Grindstone Investments 132 (Pty) Limited	4 May 2017	5 September 2017	The Court, Cameron and Froneman
[2017] ZACC 33	Mtokonya v Minister of Police	16 March 2017	19 September 2017	Zondo
[2017] ZACC 34	Limpopo Legal Solutions and Another v Eskom Holdings SOC Limited		26 September 2017	The Court
[2017] ZACC 35	Matjhabeng Local Municipality v Eskom Holdings Limited and Others; Mkhonto and Others v Compensation Solutions (Pty) Limited	2 March 2017	26 September 2017	Nkabinde
[2017] ZACC 36	Makhubela v S; Matjeke v S		29 September 2017	Mhlantla
[2017] ZACC 37	Member of the Executive Council for Health and Social Development, Gauteng v DZ obo WZ	17 August 2017	31 October 2017	Froneman
[2017] ZACC 38	Harrielall v University of KwaZulu-Natal		31 October 2017	Jafta
[2017] ZACC 39	Ferguson and Others v Rhodes University		7 November 2017	Kollapen (acting)
[2017] ZACC 40	State Information Technology Agency SOC Limited v Gijima Holdings (Pty) Limited	9 May 2017	14 November 2017	Madlanga and Pretorius (acting)
[2017] ZACC 41	Ramuhovhi and Others v President of the Republic of South Africa and Others	16 May 2017	30 November 2017	Madlanga
[2017] ZACC 42	Dladla and Others v City of Johannesburg and Another	16 February 2017	1 December 2017	Mhlantla
[2017] ZACC 43	Municipal Employees Pension Fund v Natal Joint Municipal Pension Fund (Superannuation) and Others	25 May 2017	1 December 2017	Mhlantla
[2017] ZACC 44	Phakane v S		5 December 2017	Zondo
[2017] ZACC 45	Public Servants Association obo Ubogu v Head of the Department of Health, Gauteng and Others; Head of the Department of Health, Gauteng and Another v Public Servants Association obo Ubogu	18 May 2017	7 December 2017	Nkabinde
[2017] ZACC 46	Salem Party Club and Others v Salem Community and Others	8 August 2017	11 December 2017	Cameron
[2017] ZACC 47	Economic Freedom Fighters and Others v Speaker of the National Assembly and Another	5 September 2017	29 December 2017	Jafta
[2017] ZACC 48	AfriForum and Another v University of the Free State		29 December 2017	Mogoeng
