= List of judgments of the Constitutional Court of South Africa delivered in 2004 =

The table below lists the judgments of the Constitutional Court of South Africa delivered in 2004.

The members of the court at the start of 2004 were Chief Justice Arthur Chaskalson, Deputy Chief Justice Pius Langa, and judges Tholie Madala, Yvonne Mokgoro, Dikgang Moseneke, Sandile Ngcobo, Kate O'Regan, Albie Sachs and Zak Yacoob. The seats left vacant by the retirement of Lourens Ackermann and Richard Goldstone in late 2003 were filled in February by the appointment of Thembile Skweyiya and Johann van der Westhuizen.

Citation	Case name	Heard	Decided	Majority author
[2004] ZACC 10	Minister of Home Affairs v National Institute for Crime Prevention and the Re-Integration of Offenders (NICRO) and Others	25 February 2004	3 March 2004	Chaskalson
[2004] ZACC 11	Khosa and Others v Minister of Social Development and Others; Mahlaule and Another v Minister of Social Development and Others	13 and 30 May 2003	4 March 2004	Mokgoro
[2004] ZACC 12	Lawyers for Human Rights and Another v Minister of Home Affairs and Another	19 August 2003	9 March 2004	Yacoob
[2004] ZACC 13	S v Basson	4–5 November 2003	10 March 2004	Ackermann, Madala, Mokgoro, Moseneke, Ngcobo and O'Regan
[2004] ZACC 14	Daniels v Campbell NO and Others	6 November 2003	11 March 2004	Sachs
[2004] ZACC 15	Bato Star Fishing (Pty) Ltd v Minister of Environmental Affairs and Tourism and Others	11 September 2003	12 March 2004	O'Regan
[2004] ZACC 1	Liberal Party v Electoral Commission and Others		5 April 2004	The Court
[2004] ZACC 2	S v Western Areas Ltd and Others		5 April 2004	The Court
[2004] ZACC 4	Dudley v City of Cape Town and Another		20 May 2004	The Court
[2004] ZACC 26	Dudley v City of Cape Town and Another		15 June 2004	The Court
[2004] ZACC 3	Minister of Finance and Another v Van Heerden	24 February 2004	29 July 2004	Moseneke
[2004] ZACC 5	Kaunda and Others v President of the Republic of South Africa and Others	19–20 July 2004	4 August 2004	Chaskalson
[2004] ZACC 6	Mashavha v President of the Republic of South Africa and Others	26 February 2004	6 September 2004	Van der Westhuizen
[2004] ZACC 7	Port Elizabeth Municipality v Various Occupiers	4 March 2004	1 October 2004	Sachs
[2004] ZACC 8	Mabaso v Law Society of the Northern Provinces and Another	6 May 2004	5 October 2004	O'Regan
[2004] ZACC 9	Mkontwana v Nelson Mandela Metropolitan Municipality and Another; Bissett and Others v Buffalo City Municipality and Others; Transfer Rights Action Campaign and Others v MEC for Local Government and Housing, Gauteng and Others	10–11 March 2004	6 October 2004	Yacoob
[2004] ZACC 25	Jaftha v Schoeman and Others, Van Rooyen v Stoltz and Others	11 May 2004	8 October 2004	Mokgoro
[2004] ZACC 17	Bhe and Others v Magistrate, Khayelitsha and Others; Shibi v Sithole and Others; South African Human Rights Commission and Another v President of the Republic of South Africa and Another	2–3 March 2004	15 October 2004	Langa
[2004] ZACC 19	Zondi v MEC for Traditional and Local Government Affairs, KwaZulu-Natal and Others	9 March 2004	15 October 2004	Ngcobo
[2004] ZACC 20	Rail Commuters Action Group and Others v Transnet Ltd t/a Metrorail and Others	17–18 August 2004	26 November 2004	O'Regan
[2004] ZACC 21	City of Cape Town and Another v Robertson and Another	7 September 2004	29 November 2004	Moseneke
[2004] ZACC 22	Director of Public Prosecutions, Cape of Good Hope v Robinson	24 August 2004	2 December 2004	Yacoob
[2004] ZACC 24	Radio Pretoria v Chairperson of the Independent Communications Authority of South Africa and Another		8 December 2004	The Court
