= List of judgments of the Constitutional Court of South Africa delivered in 2009 =

The table below lists the judgments of the Constitutional Court of South Africa delivered in 2009.

The members of the court at the start of 2009 were Chief Justice Pius Langa, Deputy Chief Justice Dikgang Moseneke, and judges Edwin Cameron, Yvonne Mokgoro, Sandile Ngcobo, Bess Nkabinde, Kate O'Regan, Albie Sachs, Thembile Skweyiya, Johann van der Westhuizen and Zak Yacoob. Chief Justice Langa and Justices Mokgoro, O'Regan and Sachs retired in October 2009, as they were all founding members of the court whose terms of office expired. They were replaced by the appointment of Johan Froneman, Chris Jafta, Sisi Khampepe and Mogoeng Mogoeng, and Justice Ngcobo was elevated to the post of Chief Justice.

Citation	Case name	Heard	Decided	Majority author
[2009] ZACC 1	President of the Republic of South Africa and Others v Quagliani; President of the Republic of South Africa and Others v Van Rooyen and Another; Goodwin v Director-General of Justice and Constitutional Development and Others	26 August 2008	21 January 2009	Sachs
[2009] ZACC 2	Van Straaten v President of the Republic of South Africa and Others		24 February 2009	The Court
[2009] ZACC 3	Richter v Minister of Home Affairs and Others	4 March 2009	12 March 2009	O'Regan
[2009] ZACC 4	AParty and Another v Minister of Home Affairs and Others; Moloko and Others v Minister of Home Affairs and Another	4 March 2009	12 March 2009	Ngcobo
[2009] ZACC 5	Johncom Media Investments Limited v M and Others	8 May 2008	17 March 2009	Jafta (acting)
[2009] ZACC 6	Lufuno Mphaphuli & Associates (Pty) Ltd v Andrews and Another	13 May 2008	20 March 2009	O'Regan
[2009] ZACC 7	Machele and Others v Mailula and Others	3 December 2008	26 March 2009	Skweyiya
[2009] ZACC 8	Director of Public Prosecutions, Transvaal v Minister for Justice and Constitutional Development and Others	6 November 2008	1 April 2009	Ngcobo
[2009] ZACC 9	President of the Republic of South Africa and Others v Quagliani; President of the Republic of South Africa and Others v Van Rooyen and Another; Goodwin v Director-General of Justice and Constitutional Development and Others (costs)		1 April 2009	Sachs
[2009] ZACC 10	Netherburn Engineering CC t/a Netherburn Ceramics v Mudau and Others		1 April 2009	The Court
[2009] ZACC 11	Bertie Van Zyl (Pty) Ltd and Another v Minister of Safety and Security and Others	4 November 2008	7 May 2009	Mokgoro
[2009] ZACC 12	Laerskool Generaal Hendrik Schoeman v Bastian Financial Services (Pty) Ltd		7 May 2009	The Court
[2009] ZACC 13	African National Congress v Chief Electoral Officer of the Independent Electoral Commission	5 May 2009	3 June 2009	The Court
[2009] ZACC 14	Biowatch Trust v Registrar, Genetic Resources and Others	17 February 2009	3 June 2009	Sachs
[2009] ZACC 15	Von Abo v President of the Republic of South Africa	26 February 2009	5 June 2009	Moseneke
[2009] ZACC 16	Residents of Joe Slovo Community, Western Cape v Thubelisha Homes and Others	21 August 2008	10 June 2009	The Court
[2009] ZACC 17	Strategic Liquor Services v Mvumbi NO and Others		18 June 2009	The Court
[2009] ZACC 18	Centre for Child Law v Minister for Justice and Constitutional Development and Others	5 March 2009	15 July 2009	Cameron
[2009] ZACC 19	Hassam v Jacobs NO and Others	19 February 2009	15 July 2009	Nkabinde
[2009] ZACC 20	Women's Legal Centre Trust v President of the Republic of South Africa and Others	20 May 2009	22 July 2009	Cameron
[2009] ZACC 21	Brümmer v Minister for Social Development and Others	26 May 2009	13 August 2009	Ngcobo
[2009] ZACC 22	Du Toit v Minister for Safety and Security and Another	24 February 2009	18 August 2009	Langa
[2009] ZACC 23	Koyabe and Others v Minister for Home Affairs and Others	3 March 2009	25 August 2009	Mokgoro
[2009] ZACC 24	Reflect-All 1025 CC and Others v MEC for Public Transport, Roads and Works, Gauteng and Another	5 May 2009	27 August 2009	Nkabinde
[2009] ZACC 25	Minister for Justice and Constitutional Development v Chonco and Others ("Chonco 1")	25 August 2009	30 September 2009	Langa
[2009] ZACC 26	Gcaba v Minister for Safety and Security and Others	7 May 2009	7 October 2009	Van der Westhuizen
[2009] ZACC 27	Bothma v Els and Others	13 August 2009	8 October 2009	Sachs
[2009] ZACC 28	Mazibuko and Others v City of Johannesburg and Others	2 September 2009	8 October 2009	O'Regan
[2009] ZACC 29	Minister for Justice and Constitutional Development v Nyathi, in re: Nyathi v MEC for Health, Gauteng and Another	12 August 2009	9 October 2009	Mokgoro
[2009] ZACC 30	Joseph and Others v City of Johannesburg and Others	18 August 2009	9 October 2009	Skweyiya
[2009] ZACC 31	Abahlali baseMjondolo Movement SA and Another v Premier of Kwazulu-Natal and Others	14 May 2009	14 October 2009	Moseneke
[2009] ZACC 32	Head of Department, Mpumalanga Department of Education and Another v Hoërskool Ermelo and Another	20 August 2009	14 October 2009	Moseneke
[2009] ZACC 33	Nokotyana and Others v Ekurhuleni Metropolitan Municipality and Others	15 September 2009	19 November 2009	Van der Westhuizen
[2009] ZACC 34	City of Tshwane Metropolitan Municipality v Cable City (Pty) Ltd		3 December 2009	The Court
