= List of judgments of the Constitutional Court of South Africa delivered in 2000 =

The table below lists the judgments of the Constitutional Court of South Africa delivered in 2000.

The members of the court during 2000 were President Arthur Chaskalson, Deputy President Pius Langa, and judges Lourens Ackermann, Richard Goldstone, Johann Kriegler, Tholie Madala, Yvonne Mokgoro, Sandile Ngcobo, Kate O'Regan, Albie Sachs and Zak Yacoob.

Citation	Case name	Heard	Decided	Majority author
[2000] ZACC 1	Pharmaceutical Manufacturers Association of South Africa and Another, in re: Ex Parte President of the Republic of South Africa and Others	11 November 1999	25 February 2000	Chaskalson
[2000] ZACC 2	Western Cape Provincial Government and Others, in re: DVB Behuising (Pty) Ltd v North West Provincial Government	7 November 1999	2 March 2000	Ngcobo
[2000] ZACC 3	Brummer v Gorfil Brothers Investments (Pty) Ltd and Others		30 March 2000	Yacoob
[2000] ZACC 29	Harksen v President of the Republic of South Africa and Others	2 March 2000	30 March 2000	Goldstone
[2000] ZACC 4	Dormehl v Minister of Justice and Others		14 April 2000	Chaskalson
[2000] ZACC 5	S v Manamela and Another	4 November 1999	14 April 2000	Madala, Sachs and Yacoob
[2000] ZACC 6	Minister for Welfare and Population Development v Fitzpatrick and Others	9 May 2000	31 May 2000	Goldstone
[2000] ZACC 7	Veerasamy v Engen Refinery and Another		31 May 2000	O'Regan
[2000] ZACC 8	Dawood and Another v Minister of Home Affairs and Others; Shalabi and Another v Minister of Home Affairs and Others; Thomas and Another v Minister of Home Affairs and Others	23 March 2000	7 June 2000	O'Regan
[2000] ZACC 9	First National Bank of South Africa Ltd v Land and Agricultural Bank of South Africa and Others; Sheard v Land and Agricultural Bank of South Africa and Another	16 May 2000	9 June 2000	Mokgoro
[2000] ZACC 10	South African Commercial Catering and Allied Workers Union and Others v Irvin & Johnson Ltd	18 May 2000	9 June 2000	Cameron (acting)
[2000] ZACC 11	Christian Education South Africa v Minister of Education	4 May 2000	18 August 2000	Sachs
[2000] ZACC 12	Investigating Directorate: Serious Economic Offences and Others v Hyundai Motor Distributors (Pty) Ltd and Others	16 March 2000	25 August 2000	Langa
[2000] ZACC 13	Saane v Hulme NO and Another		7 September 2000	Sachs
[2000] ZACC 14	Grootboom and Others v Government of the Republic of South Africa and Others (interim order)		21 September 2000	The Court
[2000] ZACC 15	National Police Service Union and Others v Minister of Safety and Security and Others	24 August 2000	27 September 2000	Mokgoro
[2000] ZACC 16	S v Dzukuda and Others; S v Tshilo	16 August 2000	27 September 2000	Ackermann
[2000] ZACC 17	Hoffmann v South African Airways	18 August 2000	28 September 2000	Ngcobo
[2000] ZACC 18	Janse van Rensburg NO and Another v Minister of Trade and Industry and Another NNO	31 August 2000	29 September 2000	Goldstone
[2000] ZACC 19	Government of the Republic of South Africa and Others v Grootboom and Others	11 May 2000	4 October 2000	Yacoob
[2000] ZACC 20	Levy v Glynos and Another		21 November 2000	The Court
[2000] ZACC 21	Metcash Trading Limited v Commissioner for the South African Revenue Service and Another	28 March 2000	24 November 2000	Kriegler
[2000] ZACC 22	South African Association of Personal Injury Lawyers v Heath and Others	7 September 2000	28 November 2000	Chaskalson
[2000] ZACC 23	Permanent Secretary of the Department of Education, Eastern Cape and Another v Ed-U-College (PE) (Section 21)	14 September 2000	29 November 2000	O'Regan
[2000] ZACC 24	S v Steyn	22 August 2000	29 November 2000	Madlanga (acting)
[2000] ZACC 25	S v Boesak	12 September 2000	1 December 2000	Langa
[2000] ZACC 26	Sonderup v Tondelli and Another	23 November 2000	4 December 2000	Goldstone
[2000] ZACC 27	Moseneke and Others v Master of the High Court	21 November 2000	6 December 2000	Sachs
[2000] ZACC 28	Prince v President of the Law Society of the Cape of Good Hope and Others	16 November 2000	12 December 2000	Ngcobo
