= Rammaka Mathopo =

South African judge

The Honourable Rammaka Mathopo

Justice of the Constitutional Court
- Incumbent
- Assumed office 1 January 2022
- Appointed by: Cyril Ramaphosa

Judge of the Supreme Court of Appeal
- In office 1 June 2015 – 31 December 2021
- Appointed by: Jacob Zuma

Judge of the High Court
- In office 26 January 2006 – 31 May 2015
- Appointed by: Thabo Mbeki
- Division: Gauteng

Personal details
- Born: Rammaka Steven Mathopo; 28 January 1963 (age 63) Transvaal, South Africa
- Education: University of the North

Rammaka Steven Mathopo (born 28 January 1963) is a judge of the Constitutional Court of South Africa. Before his elevation to that court in January 2022, he served in the Supreme Court of Appeal between June 2015 and December 2021. He was formerly a judge of the Gauteng High Court from January 2006 to May 2015, and he practised as an attorney for 17 years before then.

== Early life and education ==
Mathopo was born on 28 January 1963 in the region that later became Gauteng. He was one of 11 siblings. He matriculated at Mokomene High School in Botlokwa Ga-Ramokgopa, north of Polokwane in present-day Limpopo, and completed a BProc at the University of the North in 1985. He was a member of the Azanian Students' Organisation, an anti-apartheid group.

== Legal practice ==
Mathopo served his articles at SC Mhinga Attorneys between 1985 and 1989, when he was admitted as an attorney. Thereafter he opened his own practice, Mathopo Attorneys, where he practised until 2006. During that time, in 1993, he was the instructing attorney for the Motsuenyane Commission of Enquiry, which the African National Congress appointed internally to investigate allegations of abuses in Umkhonto we Sizwe military camps. Later, he served two terms as an acting judge in the Gauteng High Court in 2005.

== Gauteng High Court: 2006–2015 ==
On 26 January 2006, Mathopo was appointed permanently to the bench of the Gauteng High Court, where he served for the next 11 years. During that period, in 2013, he presided in Democratic Alliance v Acting National Director of Public Prosecutions and Others, a highly prominent case concerning the so-called spy tapes saga. Mathopo ruled in favour of the opposition Democratic Alliance in ordering the National Prosecuting Authority (NPA) to make public the "spy tapes" – taped conversations between prosecutor Bulelani Ngcuka and Scorpions head Leonard McCarthy – which had led the NPA to withdraw its corruption charges against President Jacob Zuma. However, Mathopo declined to find acting NPA head Nomgcobo Jiba guilty of contempt of court for her failure to release the recordings before then. His judgement was upheld by the Supreme Court of Appeal in Zuma v DA a year later.

Another of Mathopo's reported High Court judgements was Print Media SA and SA National Editors Forum v Minister of Home Affairs and Publications Board, which declared provisions of the Films and Publications Act to be inconsistent with the Constitution; that order was confirmed by the Constitutional Court of South Africa in 2012. Mathopo also served a lengthy stint as an acting judge of the Supreme Court of Appeal between December 2013 and December 2014.

== Supreme Court of Appeal: 2015–2022 ==
In April 2015, Mathopo was among six candidates shortlisted for appointment to one of two vacancies on the Supreme Court of Appeal. He was viewed as one of the frontrunners, alongside Nambitha Dambuza and Trevor Gorven. He was interviewed on 14 April 2015 by the Judicial Service Commission, which subsequently nominated him and Dambuza for appointment. President Zuma duly appointed him to the Supreme Court with effect from 1 June 2015.

During his years in the Supreme Court of Appeal, Mathopo twice acted as a judge in the Constitutional Court, first between August and November 2019 and then between February and November 2020. During his first acting term, he wrote the Constitutional Court's majority judgement in Tshabalala v S; Ntuli v S. The judgement confirmed that the common purpose doctrine applied to the crime of rape, including gang rape, with the implication that individuals could be convicted of rape even if they had not carried out the physical instrumentality of the sexual encounter. The ruling was widely commended as progressive. Other majority judgements he wrote while acting in the Constitutional Court included MEC for Health, Western Cape v Coetzee; National Union of Metal Workers of South Africa v Aveng Trident Steel; and Premier of Gauteng v Democratic Alliance, which set aside the decision of the Gauteng Executive Council to place the City of Tshwane under provincial administration.

== Constitutional Court: 2022–present ==
In February 2021, the Judicial Service Commission shortlisted Mathopo and nine others for appointment to one of two vacancies in the Constitutional Court. During his three-hour interview on 13 April, Chief Justice Mogoeng Mogoeng consumed an hour with questions about alleged frictions on the Supreme Court bench. Mathopo confirmed that he had seen "colleagues, especially junior colleagues... subjected to unfair criticism, unfair differentiation [and] unfair treatment by the senior colleagues", and he also suggested that some of the seniors were opposed to his own elevation. However, he also said that Mandisa Maya had ameliorated the situation when she was appointed as Deputy President of the Supreme Court. The Sunday Times reported that Mathopo was a "favourite candidate among lawyers", and the panel praised him for his involvement in judicial education and mentorship. It recommended him and four others for appointment to the vacancies.

However, the Council for the Advancement of the South African Constitution challenged the recommendation, citing inappropriate treatment of some of the other candidates, and the Judicial Service Commission agreed to re-run the interview process. Mathopo's second interview, held on 4 October, was also viewed as a success. Commentator Eusebius McKaiser commended him for "not gaming like some of the other candidates when asked thorny questions, but offering honest answers and making a case for why he holds these thoughts". The Judicial Service Commission again recommended the same five candidates, including Mathopo, and Mathopo and Jody Kollapen were the pair whom President Cyril Ramaphosa selected for appointment in December. They took office on 1 January 2022. Mathopo's first judgment as a permanent member of the court was a unanimous judgment in TM v Member of the Executive Council for Health and Social Development, Gauteng in May 2022.

== Personal life ==
He is married to Ellen Vusiwana Mathopo and has two children. He is a member of the Rhema Church. He is a grandfather of 3
