= Owen Rogers =

South African judge (born 1958)

The Honourable Owen Rogers SC

Justice of the Constitutional Court
- Incumbent
- Assumed office 1 August 2022
- Appointed by: Cyril Ramaphosa

Judge of the Western Cape High Court
- In office 15 February 2013 – 31 July 2022
- Appointed by: Jacob Zuma
- Division: Western Cape

Personal details
- Born: Owen Lloyd Rogers; 22 October 1958 (age 67) Cape Town, Cape Province; Union of South Africa
- Spouse: Susan
- Children: none
- Education: Wynberg Boys' High School
- Alma mater: University of Cape Town

Owen Lloyd Rogers, SC (born 22 October 1958) is a South African judge of the Constitutional Court of South Africa. Before his appointment to that court in August 2022, he served in the Western Cape Division of the High Court for nine years, having joined the bench in February 2013. Formerly an advocate and senior counsel at the Cape Bar, he was also a judge of the Competition Appeal Court between 2016 and 2022.

== Early life and education ==
Rogers was born on 22 October 1958 in Cape Town. He matriculated at Wynberg Boys' High School in 1976, and then attended the University of Cape Town, where he completed a BA in 1982, an Honours degree in classics in 1983, and an LLB in 1985.

== Legal practice ==
Between 1986 and 1987, he was an articled clerk at Sonnenberg Hoffmann & Galombik in Cape Town, and in 1988, he completed his pupillage at the Cape Bar. He was admitted as an advocate in 1988 and practiced at the Cape Bar for the next 25 years, earning Senior Counsel status in 1999. He had a generalist practice but was admired for his experience in competition law and tax law, and he was chairperson of the Cape Bar Council from 2004 to 2005.

Between 2001 and 2011, Rogers served as an acting judge in the Western Cape High Court on several occasions; he also acted in the Labour Court for a term in 2002. In April 2011, he was one of seven candidates whom the Judicial Service Commission shortlisted and interviewed as candidates for possible appointment to two vacancies on the Western Cape bench. However, after the interviews, the Judicial Service Commission recommended the appointment of only one candidate, Robert Henney, and left the other vacancy unfilled. The Cape Bar Council objected strenuously, maintaining that Rogers was "an exceptional candidate".

== Western Cape High Court: 2013–2022 ==
In August 2012, Rogers was one of eight candidates shortlisted for five new vacancies in the Western Cape High Court. On that occasion, the Judicial Service Commission recommended his appointment, and President Jacob Zuma appointed him to the bench with effect from 15 February 2013. Over the next nine years, prominent judgements by Rogers included a 2016 judgement, acceding to an application by the Democratic Alliance, which overturned the SABC disciplinary hearing that had cleared Hlaudi Motsoeneng of misconduct; and a 2020 judgement on the sale of South Africa's strategic oil reserves to various international oil companies. His remedial order in the latter matter was upheld on appeal by the Supreme Court of Appeal.

Rogers acted as a judge in the Competition Appeal Court between 2015 and 2016, and he was permanently appointed to that court in 2017 after an interview with the Judicial Service Commission of South Africa in October 2016. He also acted in the Supreme Court of Appeal for several terms between 2017 and 2021, and he acted in the Constitutional Court in 2021. His time in the Constitutional Court coincided with preparations for the 2021 local government elections, and Rogers wrote the majority judgement in Electoral Commission v Minister of Cooperative Governance and Traditional Affairs, a case in which the Electoral Commission unsuccessfully applied for special dispensation to postpone the constitutionally mandated elections because of the COVID-19 pandemic. He also wrote the Constitutional Court's unanimous judgement in Shiva Uranium v Tayob, as well as in Barnard Labuschagne v South African Revenue Service, Municipal Employees Pension Fund v Mongwaketse, NVM v Tembisa Hospital, and Minister of Police v Fidelity Security Services (co-written with Steven Majiedt).

During the same period, Rogers was shortlisted twice, but not recommended, for permanent promotion to the Supreme Court of Appeal of South Africa. In April 2019, his interview was diverted by Supreme Court President Mandisa Maya, who reported that appeals judges had complained about Rogers's temperament. In April 2021, much of his interview revolved around discussion of his involvement in internecine conflict on the Western Cape bench. At the time, Rogers had twice been reported to the Judicial Service Commission's Judicial Conduct Committee by Barnabas Xulu, the personal lawyer of Western Cape Judge President John Hlophe. One of the complaints, lodged against Rogers and nine other Western Cape judges, took issue with the judges' avowed refusal to share a panel with fellow judge Mustak Parker, which the judges said was a form of protest against Parker's conduct in a series of scandals involving Hlophe and his deputy, Patricia Goliath. Rogers was ultimately cleared of both complaints.

== Constitutional Court: 2022–present ==
In April 2022, Rogers and four others were shortlisted for appointment to two vacancies at the Constitutional Court. In Rogers's interview, Chief Justice Raymond Zondo disclosed that he had invited Rogers to avail himself for permanent appointment after he made "very important contributions" while serving as an acting justice. Asked about affirmative action, Rogers told the panel that, given the small size of the Constitutional Court, the primary criterion in the selection of judges should be "judicial excellence", not demographic representivity. He was also asked, by commissioner Jomo Nyambi, about his well-publicised disdain for the practice of conferring silk status on advocates; he said that he retained his view that the practice led to fee inflation and thereby restricted access to justice, but that he had "given it up as a lost cause".

The Judicial Service Commission nominated Rogers and three other candidates for appointment, and President Cyril Ramaphosa elected to appoint Rogers to one of the vacancies. The appointment was announced on 8 June and took effect on 1 August.

== Publications ==
In addition to several articles in academic publications, Rogers wrote a non-fiction book about the lives of the lawyers involved in the Jameson Raid of 1896; it is titled Lawyers in Turmoil: The Johannesburg Conspiracy of 1895 and was published in 2020.

== Personal life ==
He is married to Susan Rogers; they do not have any children.
