= Zukisa Tshiqi =

South African judge (born 1961)

The Honourable Zukisa Tshiqi

Justice of the Constitutional Court
- Incumbent
- Assumed office 1 October 2019
- Appointed by: Cyril Ramaphosa

Judge of the Supreme Court of Appeal
- In office 1 December 2009 – 31 March 2015
- Appointed by: Jacob Zuma

Judge of the High Court
- In office 25 July 2005 – 30 November 2009
- Appointed by: Thabo Mbeki
- Division: Gauteng

Personal details
- Born: Zukisa Laura Lumka Qingana; 11 January 1961 (age 65) Cefane, Cape Province; Union of South Africa
- Spouse: F. V. Tshiqi
- Education: University of the Witwatersrand

Zukisa Laura Lumka Tshiqi (née Qingana; born 11 January 1961) is a South African judge of the Constitutional Court of South Africa. She formerly served in the Supreme Court of Appeal from December 2009 until October 2019, when President Cyril Ramaphosa elevated her to the Constitutional Court. She was a practising attorney until she was first appointed to the bench in the Gauteng High Court in 2005.

== Early life and education ==
Tshiqi was born on 11 January 1961 in Cefane, a rural area near Ngcobo in the Cape Province (now Eastern Cape). She was one of eight children and her father was a farmer. She attended Cefane Primary School and matriculated in 1979 at Blythswood High School in Nqamakwe.

Thereafter she went on the University of Fort Hare but was forced to drop out due to a lack of funds. After her marriage, she moved to Johannesburg, where she enrolled in the University of the Witwatersrand. She graduated with a BProc in 1989, completing her degree while her husband was detained for a political offence and while she was pregnant with her first-born. At the university, she was lectured by Halton Cheadle, who kindled her interest in labour law. Later, in 2001, she completed an advanced diploma in labour law at the Rand Afrikaans University.

== Legal career ==
While studying towards her BProc, Tshiqi was the legal co-ordinator of the South African Council of Churches. After graduating, she completed her articles of clerkship at Neluheni Attorneys, gaining admittance as an attorney in 1991. Later that year, she joined Matlala Attorneys as a professional assistant. In 1992, she moved to the Black Lawyers Association, where she was a litigation officer and trial advocacy trainer until 1994.

Between 1994 and 2005, she was managing partner at her own firm, Tshiqi-Zebediela Attorneys. She specialised in labour and commercial law matters. During that time, from 1995 to 2005, she was also a senior commissioner at the Commission for Conciliation, Mediation and Arbitration, and she served as an acting judge in the High Court and Labour Appeal Court between 2003 and 2004.

== Gauteng High Court: 2005–2009 ==
On 31 May 2005, President Thabo Mbeki announced that Tshiqi would join the High Court permanently as a judge of the Transvaal Provincial Division (later the Gauteng Division). She joined the bench on 25 July 2005. During her four years in the High Court, she was seconded for a lengthy period to the Competition Appeal Court, where she was an acting judge between 2007 and 2009. She also acted in the Supreme Court of Appeal from April to November 2009.

== Supreme Court of Appeal: 2009–2019 ==
On 25 November 2009, President Jacob Zuma announced that Tshiqi would be elevated to the Supreme Court of Appeal permanently with effect from 1 December 2009. She was appointed alongside Jeremiah Shongwe and Eric Leach, becoming the third black African woman on the court.

She served in the appellate court for nearly a decade. During that time, between November 2014 and May 2015, she served as an acting judge in the Constitutional Court of South Africa, filling the seat of Justice Chris Jafta. During her acting stint, she wrote two majority judgements for the Constitutional Court in the matters of City Power v Grinpal Energy Management Services and Coughlan N.O. v Road Accident Fund.

Shortly after the end of her acting stint, in June 2015, Tshiqi was one of five candidates, all women, whom the Judicial Service Commission shortlisted for possible permanent appointment to Justice Thembile Skweyiya's vacant seat on the Constitutional Court. She was interviewed for the position the following month, but News24 described her interview as "fraught": members of the panel criticised her apparent hesitation to write judgements at the Supreme Court of Appeal; her lack of non-criminal experience; and an arrangement according to which her former law firm continued to pay for her cellphone bill, which Chief Justice Mogoeng Mogoeng described as "wrong". According to the Daily Maverick, legal experts also felt that, among the five candidates, Tshiqi had "the weakest record in terms of the complexity of her judgements". President Zuma appointed Nonkosi Mhlantla to fill the vacancy.

== Constitutional Court: 2019–present ==
In February 2019, the Judicial Service Commission shortlisted Tshiqi for one of two new vacancies at the Constitutional Court, this time created by the retirement of Justices Dikgang Moseneke and Bess Nkabinde. One of six candidates for the two vacancies, she was nominated by the Black Lawyers Association. When she was interviewed in April, she described herself as an "all-rounder" with experience in different fields of the law, expressed her view that judicial interpretation could not be "formalistic", and answered questions about the level of collegiality at the Supreme Court of Appeal. She also rejected the view of the General Council of the Bar, contained in the Bar's submission on her application, that she had a relatively sparse judicial record.

After the interviews, the Judicial Service Commission named Tshiqi and four other candidates – Annali Basson, Patricia Goliath, Jody Kollapen, and Steven Majiedt – as suitable for appointment. In September 2019, President Cyril Ramaphosa announced that he had selected Tshiqi and Majiedt to join the Constitutional Court with effect from 1 October.

== Personal life ==
She is married to F. V. Tshiqi, with whom she has three children. She is Christian.
