= Harksen v Lane =

South African legal case

- Court: Constitutional Court of South Africa
- Full case name: Harksen v Lane NO and Others
- Decided: 7 October 1997
- Docket nos.: CCT 9/97
- Citations: [1997] ZACC 12; 1997 (11) BCLR 1489; 1998 (1) SA 300

Case history
- Prior actions: Supreme Court of South Africa, Cape of Good Hope Provincial Division – Harksen v Lane and Others (16552/96, 25 March 1997, unreported) and Lane and Another NNO v Magistrate, Wynberg 1997 (2) SA 869 (C)

Court membership
- Judges sitting: Chaskalson P, Langa DP, Ackermann, Goldstone, Kriegler, Madala, Mokgoro, O'Regan and Sachs JJ

Case opinions
- Sections 21, 64 and 65 of the Insolvency Act, 1936 are consistent with the constitutional right to property. (Unanimous.) They are also consistent with the constitutional right to protection against unfair discrimination. (5:4.)
- Decision by: Goldstone J (Chaskalson, Langa, Ackermann and Kriegler concurring)
- Dissent: O'Regan J (Madala and Mokgoro concurring)
- Dissent: Sachs J

Harksen v Lane NO and Others is an important decision of the Constitutional Court of South Africa, delivered on 7 October 1997. The court dismissed a challenge to the constitutionality of the Insolvency Act, 1936, finding that it was consistent with the right to property and right to equality for the property of a solvent spouse to be attached to the insolvent estate of his or her partner. Justice Richard Goldstone wrote for the majority.

Apart from its import in insolvency law, Harksen is significant because of its test for determining whether a legislative provision is unfairly discriminatory. The court agreed unanimously with the test as proposed by Goldstone, but it nonetheless split five-to-four on the question of whether the Insolvency Act discriminated unfairly against married people.

== Background ==
The dispute arose from the sequestration of the insolvent estate of Jürgen Harksen, who, at the time of the sequestration, was married out of community of property to the applicant, Jeanette Harksen. With the warrant of the Supreme Court of South Africa, the sequestration commenced in October 1995, during which time the Interim Constitution was in operation.

The applicant challenged the constitutionality of section 21 and parts of section 64 and 65 of the Insolvency Act, 1936, in terms of which the sequestration proceeded. Section 21 of the Act provided that, upon the sequestration of an insolvent spouse's estate, the property of the solvent spouse would vest in the Master of the Supreme Court and subsequently in the sequestrated estate's trustees. Sections 64(2) and 65(1) respectively provided that creditors of the insolvent estate could summon and interrogate relevant persons about any matters pertaining to the business, affairs, and property of the insolvent spouse and of the solvent spouse. Accordingly, when Harksen's estate was sequestrated, his wife's property (valued at over R6 million) was attached and she was summoned and interrogated at a meeting of her husband's creditors.

The Constitutional Court heard the matter on 26 August 1997 on referral from Judge Ian Farlam of the Cape of Good Hope Provincial Division of the Supreme Court. The first and second respondents were trustees of the insolvent estate, and the third and fourth respondents were the Master of the Cape Division (by then a division of the High Court) and the Minister of Justice. None of the respondents appeared in the court to oppose the application, though Wim Trengove SC appeared on behalf of the Council of South African Banks, which was admitted as amicus curiae.

== Majority judgment ==
On 7 October 1997, Justice Richard Goldstone delivered judgment on behalf of the Constitutional Court's five-member majority, which also included Justices Arthur Chaskalson, Pius Langa, Laurie Ackermann, and Johann Kriegler. The majority dismissed the applicant's constitutional challenge, finding that the impugned provisions were consistent with the Interim Constitution; it considered and dismissed both of the primary constitutional arguments advanced by the applicant. The constitutionality of section 21 consumed most of the court's argument; the challenges to sections 64 and 65 were dismissed for substantially similar reasons as those applying to section 21.

=== Right to property ===
The applicant's first argument was premised on the claim that section 21 authorises an expropriation of the solvent spouse's property, but does so on terms that are inconsistent with section 28, the property rights clause, of the Interim Constitution: section 28(3) required that expropriations must serve a public purpose and be justly compensated.

Based on precedent and his reading of section 28, Goldstone distinguished between "expropriation (or compulsory acquisition as it is called in some other foreign jurisdictions) which involves acquisition of rights in property by a public authority for a public purpose and the deprivation of rights in property which fall short of compulsory acquisition". On this basis he concluded that the Act does not authorise expropriation, either in purpose or in effect, and that section 28(3) was therefore not engaged.

=== Right to equality ===
The applicant's second argument derived from the right to equality as enshrined in section 8, the equality clause, of the Interim Constitution. According to the applicant, the procedure authorised by section 21 of the Insolvency Act imposes severe burdens and disadvantages on the insolvent's solvent spouse, beyond those experienced by other persons (such as family members) with whom the insolvent had close dealings or exchanged property. She contended that this constituted unfair discrimination on the basis of marital status and therefore violated the rights contained in sections 8(1) and 8(2), respectively, of the Interim Constitution. In adjudicating this claim, Goldstone derived his approach from the court's limited existing equality jurisprudence, relying particularly on Prinsloo v Van der Linde and President v Hugo.

==== Equality before the law ====
Section 8(1) provided the right to equality before the law. Goldstone found that this right is violated when a legislative provision differentiates between people or categories of people in the absence of "a rational connection between the differentiation in question and the legitimate governmental purpose it is designed to further or achieve". Yet he held that section 21 of the Insolvency Act, though it may cause "inconvenience, potential prejudice and embarrassment" to solvent spouses, is not arbitrary or irrational. Its purpose – to ensure the recovery of property rightfully belonging to insolvent estate – is legitimate and is rationally related to the provisions of section 21, especially in the absence of other feasible means for achieving the same purpose efficaciously.

However, per Prinsloo, a differentiation that is rationally connected to a legitimate governmental purpose – and that therefore does not breach the section 8(1) equality right – might nonetheless constitute unfair discrimination for the purposes of section 8(2).

==== Unfair discrimination ====
===== Test =====
Section 8(2) provided the right of protection against unfair discrimination, either on certain specified grounds such as race and gender or on other grounds. Goldstone set out a three-part test under which a law constitutes unfair discrimination if it meets three criteria:

1. It differentiates between people or categories of people.
2. Such differentiation amounts to discrimination, either because it is differentiation on one of the grounds specified in section 8(2) or, alternatively, because "objectively, the ground is based on attributes and characteristics which have the potential to impair the fundamental human dignity of persons as human beings or to affect them adversely in a comparably serious manner".
3. Such discrimination is unfair, as revealed, per Hugo, primarily by "the impact of the discrimination on the complainant and others in his or her situation". Per Prinsloo, in cases of discrimination on one of the specified grounds, unfairness is presumed; in other cases, it must be established by the complainant.

If unfair discrimination is established, the provision violates section 8(2) of the Interim Constitution, but, per S v Makwanyane, it must further be determined whether this violation constitutes a proportionate and justifiable limitation of the right to equality in terms of section 33 of the Interim Constitution.

Again drawing from Hugo, Goldstone also outlined factors which should be considered, among others, in applying the third stage of the test and determining whether the provision in question "has impacted on complainants unfairly". These were:

- "the position of the complainants in society and whether they have suffered in the past from patterns of disadvantage";
- "the nature of the provision or power and the purpose sought to be achieved by it" (for example, whether the provision "is aimed at achieving a worthy and important societal goal"); and
- "the extent to which the discrimination has affected the rights or interests of complainants and whether it has led to an impairment of their fundamental human dignity or constitutes an impairment of a comparably serious nature."

===== Application =====
In the present case, Goldstone concluded that section 21 of the Insolvency Act discriminates against married people. However, the contention of unfair discrimination failed at the third stage of the test: solvent spouses are not a vulnerable or historically disadvantaged group; the provision serves the worthy purpose of "protecting the rights of the creditors of insolvent estates" in the public interest; and solvent spouses are not seriously impaired as a result, because section 21 also provides that solvent spouses may challenge the attachment of their property and reclaim the property upon providing proof of ownership. Section 21 therefore does not rise to unfair discrimination and is compliant with section 8(2) of the Interim Constitution.

== Minority judgments ==
In a dissent joined by Justices Tholie Madala and Yvonne Mokgoro, Justice Kate O'Regan agreed with the majority that the applicant's challenge on the basis of property rights, and both challenges to section 64 and 65, stood to be dismissed. However, applying Goldstone's own test for unfair discrimination, she found that section 21 infringed on the section 8(2) right to equality and that the infringement was not justifiable:

...I have concluded that there is unfair discrimination against spouses. Although the extent of the infringement is not extremely offensive or egregious, it nevertheless constitutes a significant limitation of that right [to equality]. On the other hand, although the purpose of section 21 is an important one, the relationship between purpose and effect is not closely drawn. In particular, the balance between the interests of the spouse of the insolvent and the interests of the creditors of the insolvent estate seems to favour the interests of creditors disproportionately.

In a separate dissent, Justice Albie Sachs concurred with the O'Regan minority that section 21 of the Act constitutes unfair discrimination in violation of section 8(2) of the Interim Constitution. Per Sachs, in its effect on the solvent spouse, section 21 "affronts his or her personal dignity as an independent person within the spousal relationship and perpetuates a vision of marriage rendered archaic by the values of the interim Constitution". Like O'Regan, Sachs agreed with Goldstone's exposition of the equality clause but held that Goldstone had misapplied his own test at the third step of determining the severity and therefore the unfairness of the discriminatory rule.

== Significance ==
Although the Interim Constitution was superseded by the Constitution of 1996, its protections for the right to equality were substantially preserved in Section Nine of the new Constitution. Under the new constitutional dispensation, the so-called Harksen test for unfair discrimination remained authoritative. It was applied by the court in National Coalition for Gay and Lesbian Equality v Minister of Justice the following year, and as recently as 2023 in Rafoneke v Minister of Justice. It is also applied by the Labour Court in employment discrimination disputes. Academic Cathi Albertyn has argued that the test is frequently misapplied – as in Volks v Robinson and S v Jordan, among others – and that the test:

unduly prioritises and limits the values and principles that underlie equality. Dignity is prioritised, while the purpose of remedying disadvantage is suppressed. Questions of agency and choice – captured by freedom – are implicit, at best.

Section 14 of the Promotion of Equality and Prevention of Unfair Discrimination Act, 2000 includes a statutory test for unfair discrimination which is akin to that proposed by Goldstone.

== See also ==
- Discrimination law
