= List of judgments of the Constitutional Court of South Africa delivered in 2005 =

The table below lists the judgments of the Constitutional Court of South Africa delivered in 2005.

The members of the court at the start of 2005 were Chief Justice Arthur Chaskalson, Deputy Chief Justice Pius Langa, and judges Tholie Madala, Yvonne Mokgoro, Dikgang Moseneke, Sandile Ngcobo, Kate O'Regan, Albie Sachs, Thembile Skweyiya, Johann van der Westhuizen and Zak Yacoob. Chief Justice Chaskalson retired in May, and Deputy Chief Justice Langa was elevated to Chief Justice while Justice Moseneke was elevated to Deputy Chief Justice.

Citation	Case name	Heard	Decided	Majority author
[2005] ZACC 1	S v Jaipal	16 November 2004	18 February 2005	Van der Westhuizen
[2005] ZACC 2	Volks v Robinson	20 May 2004	21 February 2005	Skweyiya
[2005] ZACC 3	Affordable Medicines Trust and Others v Minister of Health and Another	11 November 2004	11 March 2005	Ngcobo
[2005] ZACC 11	S v Van Vuuren		6 April 2005	The Court
[2005] ZACC 5	President of the Republic of South Africa and Another v Modderklip Boerdery (Pty) Ltd	4–5 November 2004	13 May 2005	Langa
[2005] ZACC 6	Sibiya and Others v Director of Public Prosecutions (Johannesburg High Court) and Others	10 March 2005	25 May 2005	Yacoob
[2005] ZACC 7	Laugh It Off Promotions v South African Breweries	8 March 2005	27 May 2005	Moseneke
[2005] ZACC 8	K v Minister of Safety and Security	10 May 2005	13 June 2005	O'Regan
[2005] ZACC 9	Du Toit v Minister of Transport	9 November 2004	8 September 2005	Mokgoro
[2005] ZACC 4	Ex Parte Institute for Security Studies, in re: S v Basson	1 December 2004	9 September 2005	The Court
[2005] ZACC 10	S v Basson	21–25 February 2005	9 September 2005	The Court
[2005] ZACC 12	De Kock v Minister of Water Affairs and Forestry and Others		26 September 2005	The Court
[2005] ZACC 13	Mnguni v Minister of Correctional Services and Others		26 September 2005	The Court
[2005] ZACC 14	Minister of Health v New Clicks	15–16 March 2005	30 September 2005	The Court
[2005] ZACC 25	Minister of Health v New Clicks: in re Application for Declaratory Relief	155–16 March 2005	30 September 2005	The Court
[2005] ZACC 15	Phillips and Others v National Director of Public Prosecutions	12 May 2005	7 October 2005	Skweyiya
[2005] ZACC 16	Sibiya and Others v Director of Public Prosecutions (Johannesburg High Court) and Others	18 August 2005	7 October 2005	Yacoob
[2005] ZACC 17	Omar v Government of the Republic of South Africa and Others	5 May 2005	7 November 2005	Van der Westhuizen
[2005] ZACC 18	Zondi v MEC for Traditional and Local Government Affairs, KwaZulu-Natal and Others	8 November 2005	29 November 2005	Ngcobo
[2005] ZACC 19	Minister of Home Affairs v Fourie; Lesbian and Gay Equality Project v Minister of Home Affairs	17 May 2005	1 December 2005	Sachs
[2005] ZACC 21	Helicopter & Marine Services (Pty) Ltd and Another v V&A Waterfront Properties (Pty) Ltd and Others		1 December 2005	The Court
[2005] ZACC 22	Veldman v Director of Public Prosecutions (Witwatersrand Local Division)	18 August 2005	5 December 2005	Mokgoro
[2005] ZACC 23	Mtotywa and Others v Director of Public Prosecutions (Mthatha)		14 December 2005	The Court
[2005] ZACC 24	Janse van Rensburg v Maluti-a-Phofung Municipality		14 December 2005	The Court
