= Bwanya v Master of the High Court =

South African legal case

- Court: Constitutional Court of South Africa
- Full case name: Jane Bwanya v Master of the High Court, Cape Town and Others
- Decided: 31 December 2021
- Docket nos.: CCT 241/20
- Citations: [2021] ZACC 51; 2022 (4) BCLR 410 (CC); 2022 (3) SA 250 (CC)

Case history
- Appealed from: High Court of South Africa, Western Cape Division – Bwanya v Master of the High Court, Cape Town [2020] ZAWCHC 111

Court membership
- Judges sitting: Mogoeng CJ, Jafta J, Khampepe J, Madlanga J, Majiedt J, Mhlantla J, Theron J, Tshiqi J, Pillay AJ and Tlaletsi AJ

Case opinions
- The Intestate Succession Act, 1987 is unconstitutional to the extent that it discriminates between the survivors of marriages and the survivors of life partnerships. (9:1). The Maintenance of Surviving Spouses Act, 1990 is unconstitutional to the same extent. (6:4).
- Decision by: Madlanga J (Khampepe, Majiedt, Pillay, Theron and Tlaletsi concurring)
- Concur/dissent: Jafta J (Mhlantla and Tshiqi concurring)
- Dissent: Mogoeng CJ

Bwanya v Master of the High Court, Cape Town and Others is an important decision in the South African law of succession and particularly the law of intestate succession. It was decided by the Constitutional Court of South Africa on 31 December 2021 with a majority judgment written by Justice Mbuyiseli Madlanga. A majority of the court upheld a challenge to the constitutionality of the Intestate Succession Act, 1981 and Maintenance of Surviving Spouses Act, 1990, holding that it was unfairly discriminatory to exclude the survivors of permanent life partnerships from the protections the acts extend to the survivors of legal marriages. Bwanya therefore overturned the holding in Volks v Robinson.

== Legal background ==
Prior to Bwanya, the often-maligned holding in Volks v Robinson had created a considerable amount of controversy as to the legal status of life partnerships, particularly in the context of the law of succession. Volks was a 2005 matter in which the Constitutional Court of South Africa had ruled that it did not constitute unfair discrimination to exclude unmarried life partners from the protections of the Maintenance of Surviving Spouses Act, 1990, because the institution of marriage creates unique "reciprocal duties of support" which do not exist between permanent life partners.

Yet this finding was regarded as incongruent with the Constitutional Court's large body of jurisprudence on same-sex life partnerships in the context of LGBT rights. Before Minister of Home Affairs v Fourie and the Civil Union Act, 2006 brought about the legalisation of same-sex marriage, the court had on various occasions held that it constituted unfair discrimination, in violation of the Bill of Rights, to exclude permanent same-sex life partners from legal protections extended to married spouses. This had been the thrust of the court's holding in, inter alia, National Coalition for Gay and Lesbian Equality v Minister of Home Affairs, Satchwell v President, Du Toit v Minister of Welfare and Population Development, and J v Department of Home Affairs.

Moreover, of direct import for the law of succession, the Constitutional Court had found in Gory v Kolver that the protections of the Intestate Succession Act, 1981 must be extended to same-sex life partners as well as to spouses. That finding was upheld after the passage of the Civil Union Act in Laubscher v Duplan in 2016. In a minority judgment in Laubscher, Justice Johan Froneman argued that the court's jurisprudence on same-sex life partners was simply incompatible with its holding in Volks and that the latter stood to be overturned. Several commentators agreed with Froneman on this point.

== Factual background ==
Jane Bwanya lived with her romantic partner, Anthony Ruch, from 2014 until his death in 2016; though she was employed as a domestic worker, he paid for many of her living expenses. They had also become engaged in November 2015, though their families had not yet negotiated lobolo. The will of the deceased nominated his mother as the sole heir to his estate, but his mother had died in 2013 and the will was to be disposed of in terms of the law of intestate succession.

Bwanya lodged two claims against the deceased's estate: a claim for inheritance of a portion of the deceased's estate under the Intestate Succession Act, and a claim for maintenance from his estate under the Maintenance of Surviving Spouses Act. The executor of the estate rejected both claims on the basis that Bwanya was not the deceased's spouse, though Bwanya asserted that their permanent life partnership was akin to a marriage.

== High Court action ==
Bwanya approached the High Court of South Africa, contending that the Intestate Succession Act and Maintenance of Surviving Spouses Act were unconstitutional to the extent that they excluded the surviving partners of permanent opposite-sex life partnerships from claiming maintenance and inheritance from the estates of their deceased partners. In particular, she contended that such exclusion was inconsistent with the constitutional right to equality and right to dignity. While this litigation was pending, Bwanya entered into a settlement agreement with the estate's executor and various relatives of the deceased, in terms of which she was awarded R3 million in final settlement of her claims against the state.

Nonetheless, Bwanya persisted in seeking an order declaring the legislation unconstitutional on the asserted grounds. On 28 September 2020, Acting Judge Penelope Magona of the Western Cape High Court partly upheld her application. In respect of the Intestate Succession Act, the court found that it was unconstitutional to exclude permanent life partners from benefits of intestate succession; it therefore ordered that, wherever the act referred to the deceased's "spouse", that word should be read to mean "spouse or a partner in a permanent opposite-sex life partnership in which the partners had undertaken reciprocal duties of support". However, the court dismissed Bwanya's challenge to the Maintenance Act, mainly because it found itself to be bound by the precedent of Volks v Robinson, in which the application and facts had been near-identical.

Bwanya approached the Constitutional Court seeking leave for direct appeal against the High Court's finding in respect of the Maintenance Act, as well as confirmation of the High Court's declaration of invalidity in respect of the Intestate Succession Act. The Constitutional Court heard argument on 16 February 2021, and the Women's Legal Centre Trust and the Commission for Gender Equality were admitted as amici curiae.

== Majority judgment ==
Handing down judgment on 31 December 2021, a majority of the Constitutional Court found in Bwanya's favour, upholding both her appeal and her application for confirmation and thereby sustaining her challenge to both pieces of legislation. An amended order was handed down, in which the court instructed Parliament to remedy the legislation to extend spousal protections to "a person in a permanent life partnership in which the partners have undertaken reciprocal duties of support". The Minister of Justice and Correctional Services, the custodian of the legislation, was instructed to pay Bwanya's costs. The majority judgment was written by Justice Mbuyiseli Madlanga and joined by Justices Sisi Khampepe, Steven Majiedt, and Leona Theron, as well as by Acting Justices Dhaya Pillay and Pule Tlaletsi.

=== Unfair discrimination ===
On the merits of Bwanya's application, Madlanga held that the exclusion of permanent heterosexual life partners from the acts' protections amounted to unfair discrimination on the ground of marital status and therefore violated the right to equality guaranteed by section 9 of the Constitution. He was, moreover, not persuaded that this limitation on the equality right was justifiable on practical grounds in terms of section 36 of the Constitution. The limitation was therefore unconstitutional.

=== Stare decisis ===
The finding that the Maintenance Act discriminated unfairly against unmarried life partners was directly contrary to the Constitutional Court's holding in Volks; thus, in Madlanga's words, "the doctrine of precedent is staring me in the face". Moreover, as set out in Camps Bay Ratepayers' and Residents' Association v Harrison, the doctrine of precedent, as a core component of the rule of law, stipulates that courts may depart from their previous decisions only if a stringent test is met: the previous decision must be "clearly wrong". Traversing the majority's reasoning in Volks, Madlanga was highly critical both of the leading judgment (by Justice Thembile Skweyiya) and of the majority concurrence (by Justice Sandile Ngcobo), yet he concluded from this evaluation that:

For a variety of reasons – which I think are apparent in my reasoning above and below – I am convinced that Volks was wrongly decided. And I am fortified in this view by the meticulously reasoned minority judgment of Froneman J in Laubscher N.O. But that is not enough... Much as I am convinced that the Volks decision was wrong, I am unable to make the jump and conclude that it was clearly wrong. Does this mean I must reach the same conclusion as Volks? I think not.

In particular, Madlanga argued that, in two important respects, the present court was presented "with a different context that makes it possible for us to reach an outcome that differs from that reached in Volks". First, the present court had heard evidence on the factual question of whether life partners choose to abstain from marriage. Ngcobo had emphasised for the Volks majority that unmarried partners choose not to marry and therefore choose not to accept the legal consequences flowing from the Maintenance Act, but Madlanga concluded, instead, that many unmarried persons – particularly vulnerable women in a patriarchal society, like homosexual people in a homophobic society – do not "realistically" have the choice to convert their romantic partnership into a legal marriage.

Second, since Volks was handed down, the Supreme Court of Appeal had developed the common law of delict in a relevant manner in Paixão v Road Accident Fund, upholding the right of same-sex life partners to institute a dependants' action (a claim for loss of support) against the Road Accident Fund upon their partner's death. Per Judge of Appeal Azhar Cachalia, in such partnerships, a legally enforceable duty of support may arise by agreement (whether implicit or explicit), rather than (as in marriage) by law. According to Madlanga, this development "opens a window for us not to follow Volks" insofar as it shows that it is no longer sustainable to distinguish the duty of support in familial relationships into two categories "purely on the basis that one arises by operation of law and the other arises from agreement". It therefore cast doubt on the Volks majority's contention that the legal status of marriage gives rise to a uniquely enforceable duty of support.

== Dissenting judgments ==
=== Jafta ===
The leading dissent was written by Justice Chris Jafta and joined by Justices Nonkosi Mhlantla and Zukisa Tshiqi. This minority concurred with the majority that the court should confirm the High Court's declaration that the Intestate Succession Act was unconstitutional and invalid. However, it disagreed that Bwanya's appeal – in respect of the Maintenance Act – should succeed. In particular, it found that Volks was not wrongly decided and that there was therefore no justification for departing from precedent.

Jafta contended that there is a "constitutional defect" in the intestate succession rights of unmarried life partners, but that this defect does not arise from the Maintenance Act but rather from "the fact that our law, as a whole, fails to govern the rights of people in permanent life partnerships", in turn due to the failure of Parliament to enact relevant statutes. The Maintenance Act exists to regulate maintenance rights arising from legal marriages, but there is no equivalent regulatory regime for life partnerships. Thus, instead of declaring the act to be invalid:

In dealing with the underlying problem here, our collective focus should be directed at once more nudging Parliament to pass the necessary legislation. It seems to me that this Court can do no more than recommend that Parliament should consider passing that legislation. And such recommendation cannot constitute a breach of the principle of separation of powers... Consequently, we consider it appropriate to refer the matter to Parliament for it to consider passing legislation to address the affairs of the permanent life partnerships which we are now told involve more than 3.2 million South Africans. This is not to suggest that Parliament must give those partnerships the recognition and status of a marriage. They are not and Parliament is free to accord them the recognition it deems fit.

=== Mogoeng ===
Chief Justice Mogoeng Mogoeng wrote a separate dissent, arguing that the court should dismiss the constitutional challenge to both acts, thereby dismissing Bwanya's appeal and overturning the High Court's declaration of invalidity. In particular, even if the acts discriminated against unmarried partners, this discrimination was fair and was justified by reference to the underlying differences between marriage and permanent life partnership. Unlike a marriage, a permanent life partnership is "somewhat informal, unannounced and ordinarily unwitnessed", meaning that the existence, nature, and "intended proprietary consequences" of each such partnership is not easily ascertainable. In some cases, a particular life partnership will attract reciprocal duties akin to those in a marriage, but a life partnership should "not be readily assumed and treated as yielding the same entitlements or obligations as marriage". Instead, if the facts in a particular case establish that there is a legally enforceable duty of support in a life partnership, such a duty will be enforced through common law, using principles such as that developed by the Supreme Court in Paixão v Road Accident Fund; common-law remedies are "well able to look after" the interests of persons in such partnerships.

Moreover, Mogoeng held – contrary to the majority – that marriage "is a matter of choice, however difficult", meaning that unmarried partners could opt in to the additional protections provide in statute. In cases where leaving or formalising a life partnership is difficult for vulnerable women, "We should seek to liberate unmarried people who are 'forced' by insecurities to stay in an oppressive permanent life partnership rather than leave the door open for and inadvertently incentivise many more to enter into and stay entangled in that unequal and sexist bondage."

== Aftermath ==
In 2023, the Judicial Matters Amendment Act was promulgated to give effect to the judgement.
