= Ex parte Harmse =

In Ex parte Harmse, an important case in South African insolvency law, the applicant's statement indicated an excess of assets over liabilities, but the only evidence that he adduced to prove otherwise were certain letters written by estate agents or valuers. The court held that the applicant had failed to adduce sufficient evidence to establish on a balance of probabilities that he was insolvent: “It is only acceptable and admissible evidence which can displace the prima facie inference of solvency when the applicant’s own estimate of values exceeds the amount of the liabilities.”

== See also ==
- South African insolvency law
