= Magnum Financial Holdings v Summerly =

In Magnum Financial Holdings (Pty) Ltd (in liquidation) v Summerly, an important case in South African insolvency law, the question to be decided was whether the trust before the court was susceptible of sequestration. This depended on whether it was a “debtor” as defined in section 2 of the Act.

The court held that, because the trust could, through its trustees, acquire property and incur liabilities, and because it was not a body corporate as contemplated by section 2, it fell within the meaning of the term “debtor” in that section.

== See also ==
- South African insolvency law
