= Miller v Janks =

South African legal case

In Miller v Janks, an important case in South African insolvency law, the court held that an insolvent possesses an estate capable of being sequestrated even though, at the time of sequestration, his estate consists only of liability.

== Facts ==
Miller had acquired an estate by means of his occupation as a professional gambler. His assets had subsequently disappeared under suspicious circumstances, leaving only liabilities. Miller's wife possessed fixed property, which she had received while Miller was pursuing his occupation.

In an application by Janks to sequestrate Miller's estate, Miller contended that sequestration was not competent because he had no assets and, therefore, no estate.

== Law ==
In Ex parte Collins, the judge had held that an estate consists both of assets and of liabilities. If there were no assets but only liabilities, there could be no estate (and vice versa). Were this proposition correct, no order of compulsory sequestration could be granted where the debtor, immediately prior to the application for sequestration, had got rid of all his assets by a series of depositions.

== Judgment ==
The court granted an order sequestrating Miller's estate. It rejected Miller's argument that, because he no longer had any assets, he had ceased to have an estate and that therefore sequestration was not possible.

== See also ==
- South African insolvency law
