= Ex parte Alberts =

In Ex parte Alberts, an important case in South African insolvency law, the applicant's schedules showed assets to the value of £76 and fifteen creditors (all concurrent) for £300. The court held that, before a court may accept a voluntary surrender,

- it must be satisfied that it will be to the advantage of creditors of the debtor if his estate is sequestrated;
- the petition must contain a specific allegation that the sequestration will be to the advantage of the creditors; and
- the allegation must be amplified by facts supporting it, save when the figures speak for themselves.

The court held that an insufficient case had been made out to show that the sequestration would be to the advantage to the creditors and that the application should be refused.

== See also ==
- South African insolvency law
