= Volks v Robinson =

South African legal case

- Court: Constitutional Court of South Africa
- Full case name: Volks NO v Robinson and Others
- Decided: 21 February 2005
- Docket nos.: CCT 12/04
- Citations: [2005] ZACC 2; 2005 (5) BCLR 446 (CC)

Case history
- Appealed from: High Court of South Africa, Cape Provincial Division – Robinson and Another v Volks NO and Others 2004 (6) SA 288 (C); 2004 (6) BCLR 671 (C)

Court membership
- Judges sitting: Chaskalson CJ, Langa DCJ, Mokgoro J, Moseneke J, Ngcobo J, O’Regan J, Sachs J, Skweyiya J, van der Westhuizen J and Yacoob J

Case opinions
- Decision by: Skweyiya J (Chaskalson, Langa, Moseneke, Ngcobo, van der Westhuizen and Yacoob concurring)
- Concurrence: Ngcobo J (Chaskalson, Langa, Moseneke, van der Westhuizen and Yacoob concurring)
- Dissent: Mokgoro and O'Regan JJ
- Dissent: Sachs J

Volks NO v Robinson and Others is an important decision in South African family law and law of succession. In a majority judgment written by Justice Thembile Skweyiya, the Constitutional Court of South Africa dismissed a challenge to the constitutionality of the Maintenance of Surviving Spouses Act, 1990. The court held that it is not discriminatory for the Act to exclude the survivors of permanent life partnerships from the protections it extends to the survivors of legal marriages. Married couples are entitled to claim maintenance from their deceased spouse's estate because the institution of marriage creates unique reciprocal duties of support which do not exist between permanent life partners.

The holding in Volks is controversial and the Constitutional Court departed from it in 2020 when it decided Bwanya v Master of the High Court, a similar case in which it came to a contrary conclusion.

== Background ==
Ethel Robinson was in a monogamous permanent life partnership with one Mr. Shandling from 1985 until his death in 2001. Though they were not legally married and had no children together, they had lived together continuously in Cape Town since 1989; they shared household costs and Robinson, a freelance journalist, was to a large extent dependent on the deceased's financial assistance. In his will, the deceased bequeathed Robinson a car, the contents of their home, and a sum of R100,000; the will also entitled her to remain in the home for a period not exceeding nine months. The residue of the estate (some R250,000) was bequeathed to the deceased's adult children, born of a prior marriage.

In 2003, Robinson notified the Master of the High Court that she intended to claim maintenance from the residue of the deceased's estate. Richard Volks, who was the deceased's law partner and the executor of his estate, was not amenable to this claim, because Robinson was not the legal spouse of the deceased.

== High Court action ==
Robinson sued in the High Court of South Africa. She sought an order declaring that she was the deceased's "survivor" for the purposes of the Maintenance of Surviving Spouses Act, 1990, which entitles surviving spouses to claim maintenance from the estates of their deceased spouses; she argued that her relationship with the deceased was substantially akin to a marriage. In the event that the High Court found that Robinson was not a "survivor" because she was not legally married to the deceased, she alternatively sought an order declaring that the Act was unconstitutional insofar as it excluded permanent life partners from the protections granted to surviving spouses. The Women's Legal Centre was permitted leave to intervene in support of Robinson's application.

Judge Dennis Davis of the High Court's Cape Provincial Division upheld Robinson's application. Applying the so-called equality test formulated in Harksen v Lane NO and Others, Davis found that the Maintenance of Surviving Spouses Act differentiates between married spouses and unmarried cohabitants in "a permanent and intimate life partnership", that there are no justificatory grounds for such differentiation, and that the relevant provisions therefore constitute unfair discrimination in violation of the right to equality enshrined in Section 9 of the Constitution. Davis thus held that the legislation is unconstitutional and invalid to the extent that life partners are excluded from the definitions of spouse, marriage, and survivor; he ordered that life partnerships should be read into the provisions so that their protections would extend to surviving life partners.

Robinson approached the Constitutional Court of South Africa for confirmation of the High Court's order, while Volks sought to appeal it. The matter was heard on 20 May 2004 and judgment was handed down on 21 February 2005.

== Judgments ==
Writing for the majority, Justice Thembile Skweyiya upheld Volks's appeal, finding that it is not discriminatory for the Maintenance of Surviving Spouses Act to differentiate between legal spouses and unmarried life partners. In particular, unmarried life partners lack the "reciprocal duty of support" that inheres uniquely between married persons. The purpose of the Act is to recognise that duty and to redress the fact that the death of one spouse would otherwise leave the duty unfulfilled. By contrast, in extending the Act to life partners, the court would impose an obligation on the deceased's estate where there was no such obligation on the deceased while he was alive.

Chief Justice Arthur Chaskalson, Deputy Chief Justice Pius Langa, and Justices Dikgang Moseneke, Sandile Ngcobo, Johann van der Westhuizen, and Zak Yacoob joined Skweyiya's judgment. The same group, save Skweyiya, also joined in a separate concurring judgment filed by Ngcobo; Ngcobo argued that the relevant provisions discriminated against surviving life partners but did not do so unfairly.

The three dissenting judges were Justices Yvonne Mokgoro, Kate O'Regan, and Albie Sachs. The trio professed themselves to be in broad agreement with each other in finding that the relevant provisions were indeed unconstitutional, though they outlined their reasons in two separate opinions, one co-written by Mokgoro and O'Regan and the other written by Sachs. Sachs agreed with the order proposed by Mokgoro and O'Regan, which would have broadly upheld the High Court's order: the Maintenance of Surviving Spouses Act would be read to include "the surviving partner of a permanent heterosexual life partnership terminated by the death of one partner in which the partners undertook reciprocal duties of support and in circumstances where the surviving partner has not received an equitable share in the deceased partner's estate" as survivors, while permanent heterosexual life partnerships would be regarded as marriages for the purposes of the Act.

== Reception ==
The majority judgment in Volks remains controversial. In 2019, Judge Davis – the High Court judge whose judgment was overturned by the Constitutional Court – criticised the majority judgment for claiming to recognise the vulnerability experienced by unmarried women in cohabitation relationships while also demonstrating "a general refusal to attribute legal consequences to this social reality". Davis wrote:

The manner in which the majority attributes innate legal consequences to marriage, refusing to interrogate the manner in which law is itself a social construct, is illustrative of a legal culture that eschews the challenge of legal transformation posed by the introduction of the Constitution in terms of which all legal rules need to be interrogated to test whether they pass constitutional muster. The result of the majority judgment is to entrench the concept of marriage above all other forms of relationship.

Likewise, other commentators viewed it as "incomprehensible" that the majority had failed to recognise the reciprocal duties of support inherent in permanent heterosexual life partnerships, especially since it had inferred the existence of such a duty in same-sex life partnerships in Du Plessis v Road Accident Fund, Gory v Kolver, and Satchwell v President, among others. These commentators argued that for many women in heterosexual life partnerships, as for many homosexual individuals before the Civil Union Act, "the choice of formalisation [of the partnership] exists merely in theory".

Volks v Robinson is generally regarded as having created uncertainty about the legal status of life partnerships. In 2016, the Constitutional Court heard Laubscher NO v Duplan and Another, in which it unanimously upheld the intestate succession rights of "unmarried same-sex partners in a permanent same-sex partnership, in which the partners have undertaken reciprocal duties of support". In that case, Justice Johan Froneman wrote a minority opinion attempting to "meet Volks head-on" and concluding that "Volks cannot stand". Four years later, the court handed down judgment in Bwanya v Master of the High Court, which departed substantially from the majority judgment in Volks and closely aligned itself with the minority. Justice Mbuyiseli Madlanga, who wrote for the Bwanya majority, professed that "much as I am convinced that the Volks decision was wrong, I am unable to make the jump and conclude that it was clearly wrong"; yet he found that the departure from the Volks precedent was nonetheless appropriate because of intervening legal developments.
