= Walker v Syfret NO =

South African legal case

Walker v Syfret NO 1911 AD 141 is an important case in South African insolvency law.

== Facts ==
When L Co was wound up, JW (the plaintiff's brother) was the holder of debentures for 28,000 pounds, which the company had issued before its liquidation. His claim on the debentures was extinguished, however, on account of a debt of at least 55,000 pounds, which he owed to the company.

Subsequently, JW transferred the debentures to the plaintiff, who was aware that the company was in liquidation and that his brother personally could not recover on the debentures.

The plaintiff sued for an order compelling the liquidator to admit and rank his claim for payment. The plaintiff maintained that, because the debentures were negotiable instruments, his claim, unlike that of his brother, was not subject to set-off.

== See also ==
- South African insolvency law
