= Section Nine of the Constitution of South Africa =

Section Nine of the Constitution of South Africa guarantees equality before the law and freedom from discrimination to the people of South Africa. This equality right is the first right listed in the Bill of Rights. It prohibits both discrimination by the government and discrimination by private persons; however, it also allows for affirmative action to be taken to redress past unfair discrimination.

== Text ==
Under the heading "Equality", the section states:

9. (1) Everyone is equal before the law and has the right to equal protection and benefit of the law.

(2) Equality includes the full and equal enjoyment of all rights and freedoms. To promote the achievement of equality, legislative and other measures designed to protect or advance persons, or categories of persons, disadvantaged by unfair discrimination may be taken.

(3) The state may not unfairly discriminate directly or indirectly against anyone on one or more grounds, including race, gender, sex, pregnancy, marital status, ethnic or social origin, colour, sexual orientation, age, disability, religion, conscience, belief, culture, language and birth.

(4) No person may unfairly discriminate directly or indirectly against anyone on one or more grounds in terms of subsection (3). National legislation must be enacted to prevent or prohibit unfair discrimination.

(5) Discrimination on one or more of the grounds listed in subsection (3) is unfair unless it is established that the discrimination is fair.

== Notable cases ==
- President of the Republic of South Africa and Another v Hugo (1997) — a presidential decision to remit the sentences of imprisoned mothers with young children is not unfair discrimination against similarly-situated fathers.
- Prinsloo v Van der Linde and Another (1997) — a law which imposes a different onus of proof in civil cases involving forest fires does not deny equal protection of the law or amount to unfair discrimination.
- Larbi-Odam and Others v MEC for Education (North-West Province) and Another (1997) — a government policy prohibiting the employment of non-citizens as school teachers is unfair discrimination.
- City Council of Pretoria v Walker (1998) — a municipality's policy of charging a metered rate for water and electricity in formerly white areas but a flat rate per household in formerly black areas, with the effect that the residents of the white area pay higher rates on average, is not unfair discrimination, as the facilities provided to different areas are significantly different. However, the policy of suing to collect payments in arrears from residents of the white areas, but not suing similarly-situated residents of the black areas, is unfair discrimination.
- National Coalition for Gay and Lesbian Equality and Another v Minister of Justice and Others (1998) — the criminalisation of male same-sex sexual relations is unfair discrimination on the grounds of gender and sexual orientation.
- National Coalition for Gay and Lesbian Equality and Others v Minister of Home Affairs and Others (1999) — an immigration law which provides benefits to married couples discriminates on the basis of sexual orientation and must be extended to provide the same benefits to same-sex life partners.
- Hoffmann v South African Airways (2000) — a government-owned airline's policy of refusing to hire HIV-positive people as flight attendants violates the right to equality.
- Satchwell v President of the Republic of South Africa and Another (2002) — pension and retirement benefits provided to the spouses of judges must be equally provided to the same-sex life partners of judges.
- S v Jordan and Others (2002) — the gender-neutral criminalisation of prostitution does not discriminate unfairly against women.
- Khosa v Minister of Social Development; Mahlaule v Minister of Social Development (2003) — social welfare grants provided to South African citizens must also be provided to non-citizen permanent residents; to do otherwise is unfair discrimination.
- Daniels v Campbell NO (2004) — the right to maintenance and intestate succession must be extended to monogamous Muslim marriages even if they are not civilly registered.
- Bhe and Others v Magistrate, Khayelitsha, and Others (2004) — the rule of male primogeniture in the African customary law of inheritance discriminates unfairly against women and against younger children.
- Volks v Robinson (2005) — it is not unfair discrimination to exclude the survivors of permanent life partnerships from the maintenance and succession benefits granted by marriage (later overturned by Bwanya v Master of the High Court).
- Minister of Home Affairs and Another v Fourie and Another (2005) — the denial of marriage to same-sex couples is unfair discrimination on the basis of sexual orientation. (See same-sex marriage in South Africa.)
- Gory v Kolver NO (2006) — the right of intestate inheritance must be extended to same-sex life partners.
- Geldenhuys v National Director of Public Prosecutions (2008) — a difference in the age of consent for heterosexual and homosexual intercourse is unfair discrimination.
- Hassam v Jacobs (2009) — the right to maintenance and intestate succession must be extended to polygamous Muslim marriages (extending Daniels v Campbell NO).
- Bwanya v Master of the High Court (2021) — the right to maintenance and intestate succession must be extended to opposite-sex life partners (extending Gory v Kolver NO and overturning Volks v Robinson).
- Women's Legal Centre Trust v President of the Republic of South Africa and Others (2022) — the non-recognition of Muslim marriages concluded under Sharia law is unfair discrimination on the basis of gender and religion.
- Rafoneke v Minister of Justice and Correctional Services (2022) — it is not unfair discrimination that enrolment as a legal practitioner is restricted to South African citizens and permanent residents.
- Jordaan and Others v Minister of Home Affairs and Another (2025) — a law which allows a wife to adopt her husband's surname but not vice versa is unfair discrimination.

== See also ==
- Promotion of Equality and Prevention of Unfair Discrimination Act, 2000
