= National Coalition for Gay and Lesbian Equality v Minister of Home Affairs =

South African legal case

- Court: Constitutional Court of South Africa
- Full case name: National Coalition for Gay and Lesbian Equality and Others v Minister of Home Affairs and Others
- Decided: 2 December 1999
- Citations: [1999] ZACC 17, 2000 (1) BCLR 39 (CC), 2000 (2) SA 1 (CC)

Case history
- Appealed from: Cape Provincial Division

Court membership
- Judges sitting: Chaskalson P, Langa DP, Ackermann, Goldstone, Madala, Mokgoro, Ngcobo, O'Regan, Sachs & Yacoob JJ, Cameron AJ

Case opinions
- Decision by: Justice Ackermann

Keywords
- LGBT rights, immigration equality

National Coalition for Gay and Lesbian Equality and Others v Minister of Home Affairs and Others, [1999] ZACC 17, is a 1999 decision of the Constitutional Court of South Africa which extended to same-sex partners the same benefits granted to spouses in the issuing of immigration permits. It was the first Constitutional Court case to deal with the recognition of same-sex partnerships, and also the first case in which a South African court adopted the remedy of "reading in" to correct an unconstitutional law. The case is of particular importance in the areas of civil procedure, immigration, and constitutional law and litigation.

In the area of constitutional litigation, the court considered its powers where it has declared a law or provision to be inconsistent with the Constitution. It found that, where the constitutional invalidity resulted from an omission in the legislation, it was not possible to cure the defect by way of notional severance. The only logical equivalent of severance, the court determined, is "reading in," which can be an appropriate form of relief under section 38 of the Constitution. Whether the court reads in or strikes out words from a challenged law, the focus should be on the appropriate remedy, not on the label used to arrive at the result.

== Background ==
The Aliens Control Act was the primary statute governing immigration law; it required that any foreigner who wanted to permanently move to South Africa obtain an immigration permit. Section 25(5) of the act authorized the Department of Home Affairs to issue an immigration permit to the spouse of a South African citizen or permanent resident, even if that spouse would not otherwise meet the requirements for such a permit. Section 28(2), meanwhile, allowed the Minister of Home Affairs to grant exemptions from the permit requirement in special circumstances.

On 27 April 1994 the Interim Constitution of South Africa, which contained a section prohibiting unfair discrimination on the basis of sexual orientation, came into force; on 4 February 1997 it was replaced by the final Constitution of South Africa, which contained an identical provision. After 1994 the National Coalition for Gay and Lesbian Equality (NGCLE) entered into negotiations with the Department of Home Affairs on various issues, including the recognition of same-sex relationships for immigration purposes. The negotiations were initially successful, and the department agreed to consider the foreign same-sex partners of South Africans for exemptions under section 28(2); at least thirteen such exemptions were granted during 1997. In January 1998, however, the department changed its policy, deciding that same-sex partners did not qualify for the "special circumstances" requirement.

The NCGLE, joined by six same-sex couples and the Commission for Gender Equality, asked the Cape Provincial Division of the High Court to declare section 25(5) of the Aliens Control Act to be invalid because it discriminated on the basis of sexual orientation and therefore violated the constitutional right to equality. The three-judge panel of the High Court handed down its decision in February 1999, ruling that the section was indeed unconstitutional. So that spouses were not immediately deprived of immigration benefits, the order was suspended for twelve months to allow Parliament to correct the unconstitutionality. The court ruled that, in the interim, "special circumstances" existed and that same-sex partners were to receive section 28(2) exemptions.

The government appealed the High Court's decision to the Constitutional Court; the Constitution also requires that any court order that declares an Act of Parliament to be unconstitutional be confirmed by the Constitutional Court.

== Judgment ==
The Constitutional Court heard oral argument on 17 August 1999, and its unanimous judgment was delivered on 2 December. The opinion was authored by Justice Lourens Ackermann.

The basis of the NCGLE's case was that providing immigration benefits to "spouses" – necessarily opposite-sex couples – that were not available to same-sex couples amounted to unfair discrimination on the basis of sexual orientation. Section 9(3) of the Constitution states that "the state may not unfairly discriminate directly or indirectly against anyone on one or more grounds, including [...] sexual orientation." They also argued that it discriminated on the basis of marital status, also a prohibited ground under section 9(3).

The government argued that the case was not "ripe" for the court to hear, claiming that the committees responsible for approving immigration permits could interpret the word "spouse" to include same-sex partners and that the law would then not be discriminatory. The court disagreed, stating that "spouse" could not reasonably be extended to include unmarried partners; as same-sex marriages were not (at that time) legal or recognised in South African law, the law as written could not be interpreted to include same-sex partners. The government also argued that immigration policy was at the complete discretion of the government and that foreign nationals did not have the right to equality in immigration decisions. The court, without accepting the validity of this argument, dismissed it as irrelevant, stating that the rights of the South African partners were also affected by the government's policy.

Addressing the discrimination directly, the government denied that it was based on sexual orientation, arguing that it was based on "non-spousal" grounds not protected by section 9(3). The court dismissed this argument, as well the government's alternative argument that gays and lesbians were free to marry partners of the opposite sex and thus obtain the benefits of marriage. Justice Ackermann described this second argument as "a meaningless abstraction". The court ruled that section 25(5) was indeed discriminatory on the overlapping grounds of sexual orientation and marital status. According to section 9(5) of the Constitution, discrimination on these grounds is presumed to be unfair unless it can be proved otherwise. Although unfairness was presumed, the court proceeded to examine the impact of the discrimination on gays and lesbians, noting that they were a vulnerable minority who had suffered from past disadvantage. In a passage repeatedly quoted in subsequent decisions on the rights of same-sex couples, Justice Ackermann describes "the facts concerning gays and lesbians and their same-sex partnerships":

Gays and lesbians in same-sex life partnerships are as capable as heterosexual spouses of expressing and sharing love in its manifold forms including affection, friendship, eros and charity;

They are likewise as capable of forming intimate, permanent, committed, monogamous, loyal and enduring relationships; of furnishing emotional and spiritual support; and of providing physical care, financial support and assistance in running the common household;

They are individually able to adopt children and in the case of lesbians to bear them;

In short, they have the same ability to establish a consortium omnis vitae;

Finally [...] they are capable of constituting a family, whether nuclear or extended, and of establishing, enjoying and benefiting from family life which is not distinguishable in any significant respect from that of heterosexual spouses.

In light of these facts, the court ruled that the discrimination had the effect of reinforcing harmful stereotypes about gays and lesbians.

The government's final argument was that the discrimination was fair because it served the public purpose of protecting the institution of marriage. This, too, was dismissed, with the court stating that there was no rational connection between denying benefits to same-sex couples and the protection of marriage. The court held that section 25(5) amounted to unfair discrimination and therefore infringed on the right to equality as well as the right to human dignity. Not finding any opposing interest that could justify these severe infringements, the court declared the section to be unconstitutional.

=== Reading in ===
The High Court had remedied the unconstitutionality by declaring section 25(2) invalid, but suspending the declaration and providing interim relief for the affected couples. The Constitutional Court decided that, in cases where a law is unconstitutional because of an omission, the courts may apply the technique of "reading in" to insert words to extend the law. The court laid down certain conditions, requiring that the words to be read in can be precisely defined, and that they should not interfere too greatly with the intent of Parliament.

Ackermann was persuaded by the submission of Advocate Wim Trengove (counsel for the appellants) that, as far as deference to the legislature was concerned, there was no difference, in principle, between the court's rendering a statutory provision constitutional by removing the offending part by actual or notional severance, and the court's doing the same thing by reading words into a statutory provision. In both cases, the parliamentary enactment, as expressed in a statutory provision, was being altered by the order of the court—in the one case by excision and in the other by addition.

"This chance difference," wrote Ackermann, "cannot by itself establish a difference in principle." The only relevant enquiry, he held, was what the consequences of such an order were, and whether they constituted an unconstitutional intrusion into the domain of the legislature. Any other conclusion would lead to what he described as

the absurdity that the granting of a remedy would depend on the fortuitous circumstance of the form in which the Legislature had chosen to enact the provision in question. A Legislature could, for example, extend certain benefits to life-partners generally and exclude same-sex life partners by way of express exception. In such case there would be no objection to declaring the exception invalid, where a Court was satisfied that such severance was, on application of whatever the appropriate test might be, constitutionally justified in relation to the Legislature. It would be absurd to deny the reading-in remedy, where it was equally constitutionally justified in relation to the Legislature, simply because of its form.

There was, Ackermann found, "nothing in the Constitution to suggest that form must be placed above substance in a way that would result in so glaring an anomaly." He concluded, accordingly, that reading in, "depending on all the circumstances," was an appropriate form of relief under section 38 of the Constitution. He quoted with approval the Canadian case of Knodel v British Columbia (Medical Services Commission): "Whether a court 'reads in' or 'strikes out' words from a challenged law, the focus of the Court should be on the appropriate remedy in the circumstances and not on the label used to arrive at the result." The real question, according to Ackermann, was "whether, in the circumstances of the present matter, reading in would be just and equitable and an appropriate remedy."

=== Retrospective effect ===
In this case, the words "or partner, in a permanent same-sex life partnership," were inserted after the word "spouse". The court ruled that the order would not be retrospective, as partners whose applications for a permit had previously been denied were free to reapply in light of the new situation.

== Subsequent developments ==
In 2002 the Aliens Control Act was replaced by a new Immigration Act, in which the word "spouse" was defined as including "a person who is party to ... a permanent homosexual or heterosexual relationship which calls for cohabitation and mutual financial and emotional support, and is proven by a prescribed affidavit substantiated by a notarial contract."

The decision in National Coalition for Gay and Lesbian Equality v Minister of Home Affairs was followed by a series of judgments extending to same-sex couples other benefits of marriage, including adoption, medical and pension benefits, artificial insemination, and intestate inheritance. In December 2005 the Constitutional Court ruled in Minister of Home Affairs v Fourie that Parliament was required to extend marriage to same-sex couples, which it duly did with the passage of the Civil Union Act in November 2006.

== See also ==
- Immigration equality
