= Same-sex immigration policy in Brazil =

LGBT immigration equality by country or territory Recognition of same-sex couples in national immigration laws Unknown/ambiguous

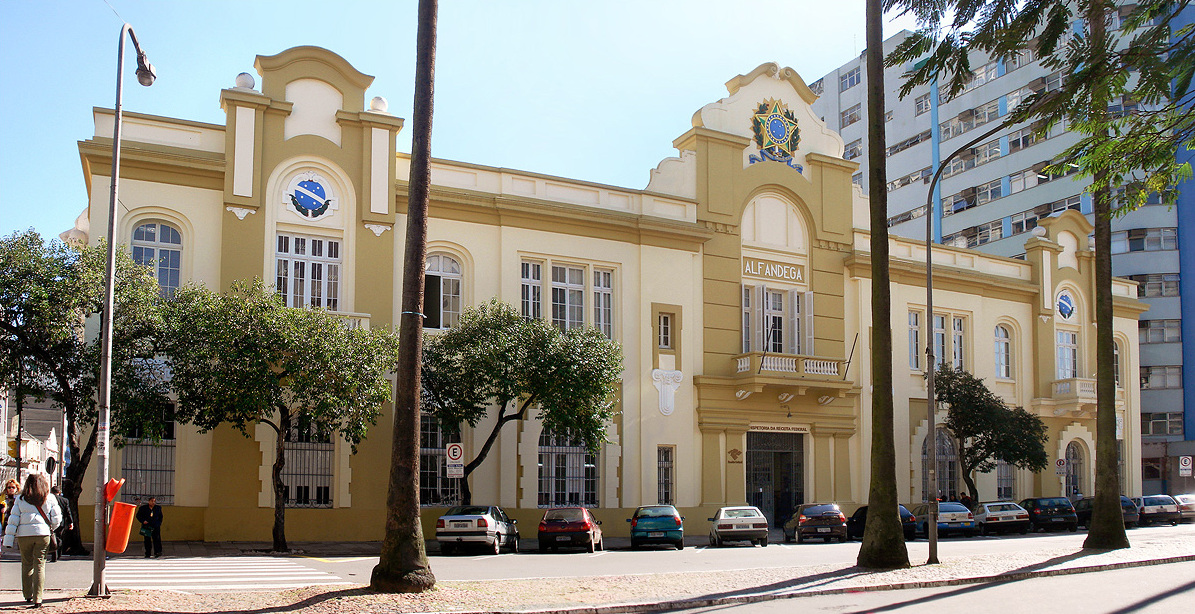
The old Customs of Porto Alegre.

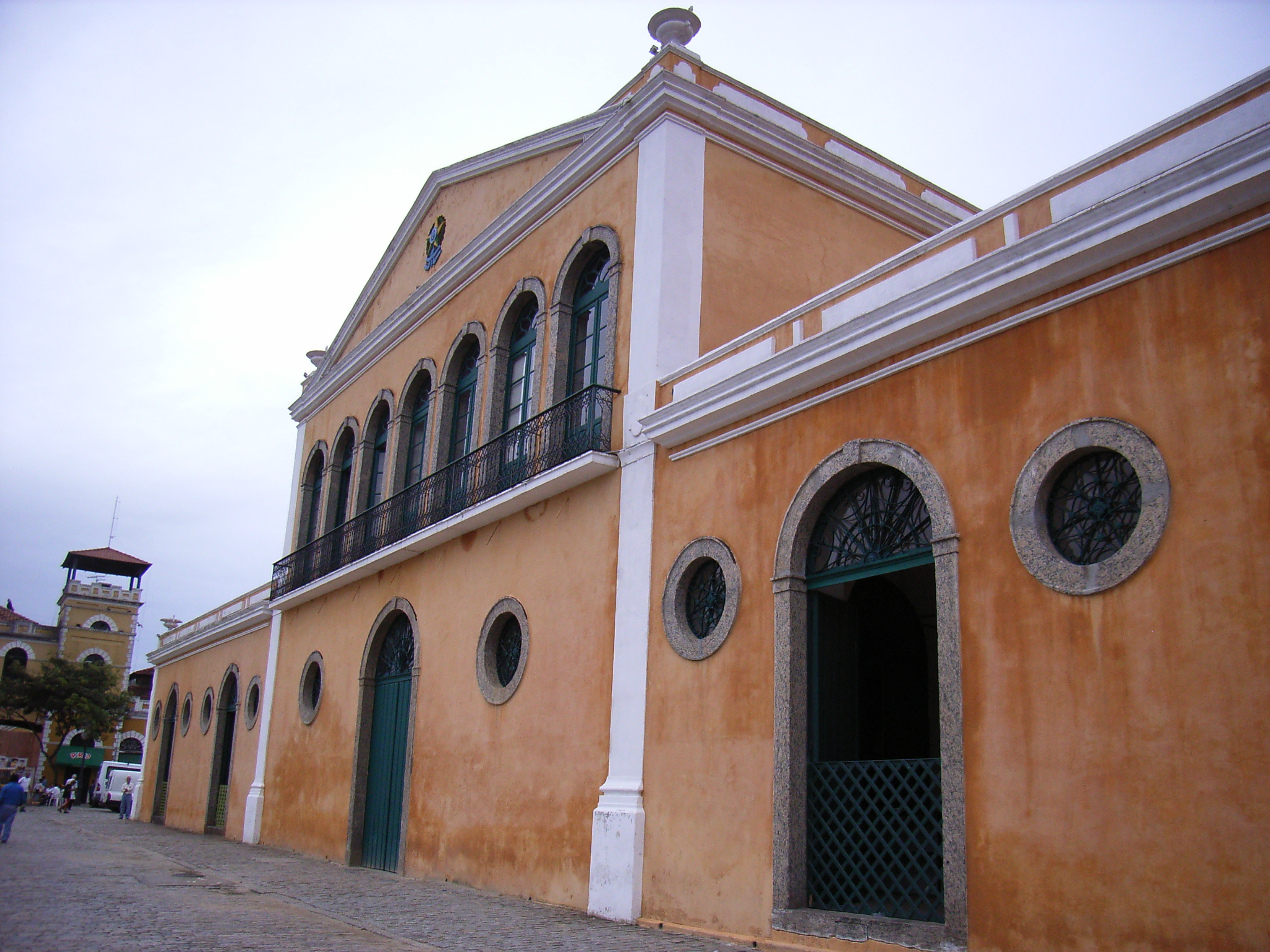
The old Customs of Florianópolis.

Same-sex immigration policy in Brazil or immigration equality is legal in Brazil since December 3, 2003, and the new text is of January 29, 2008. The Federal Police of Brazil, located in the Brazilian Airports, is the responsible by this initial procedure, that forwards the documents to the National Immigration Council of Brazil, located in Brasília, the federal capital. Which examines whether the union is true, such as opposite-sex couples.

== Official document ==
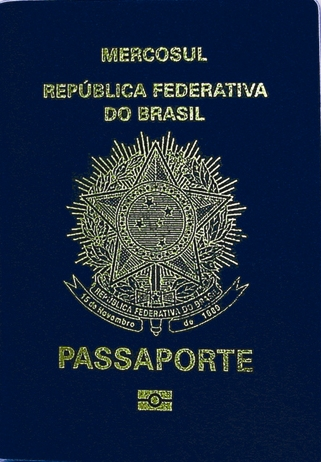
Brazilian passport.

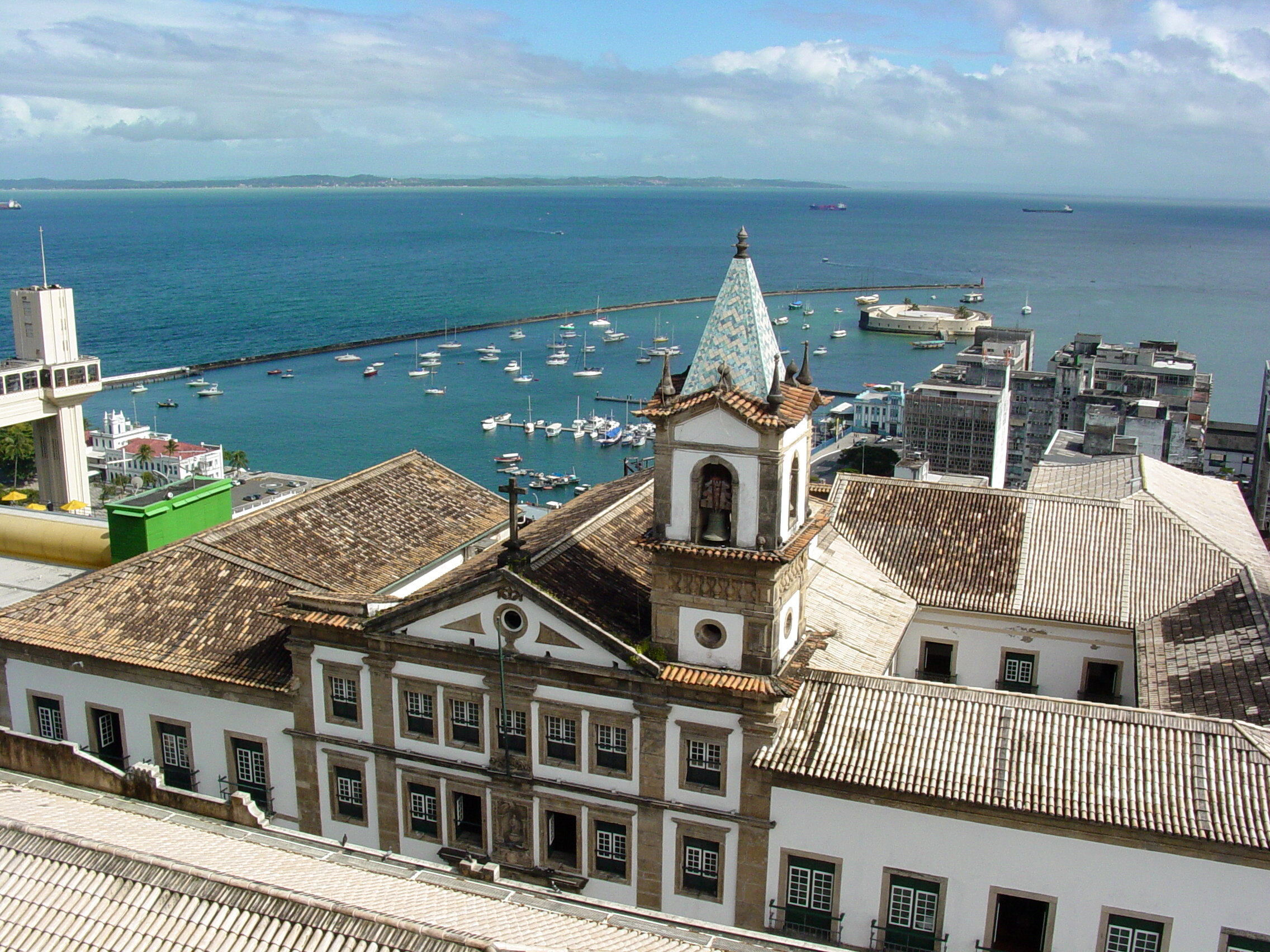
The old Customs of Salvador.

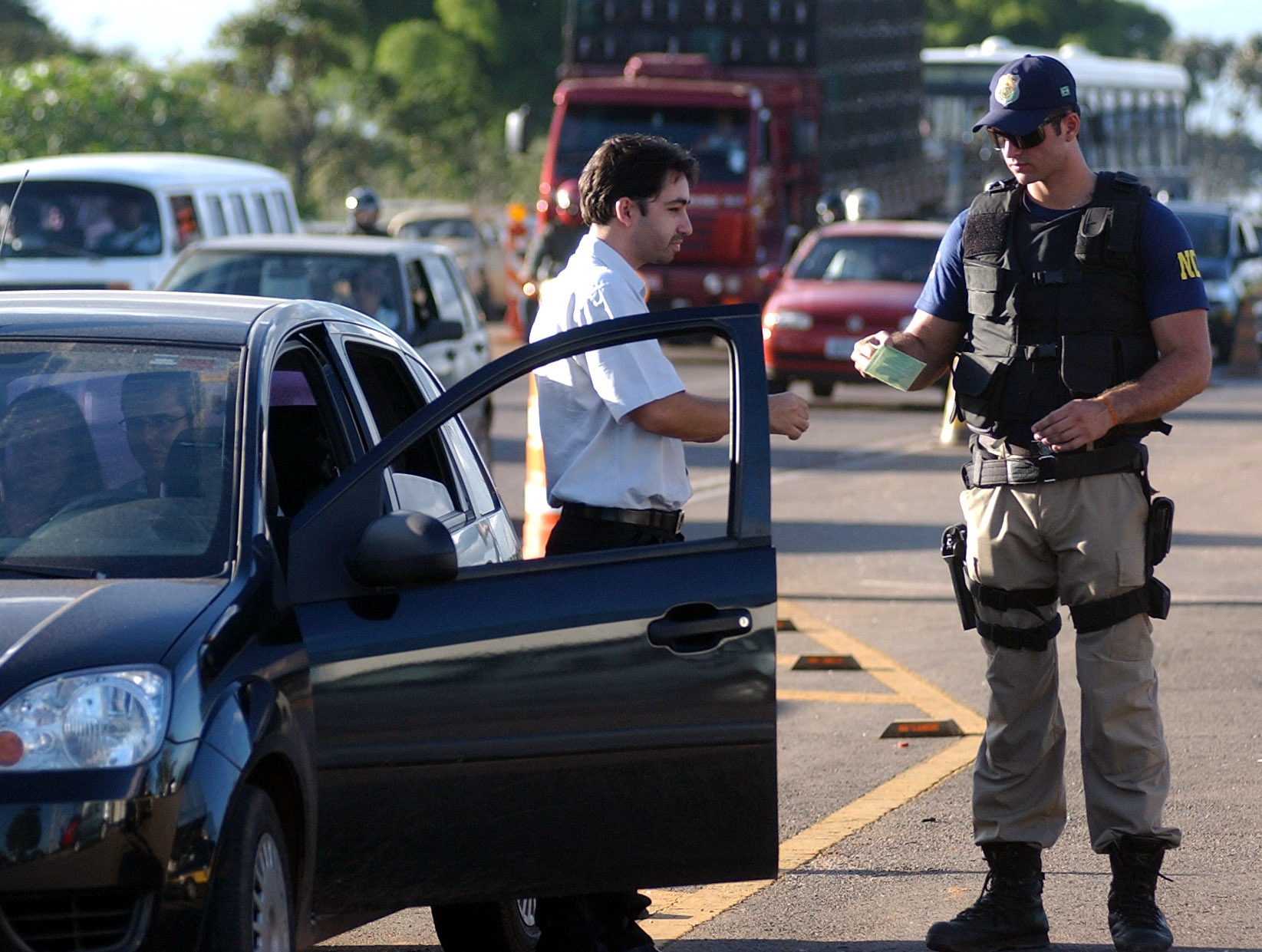
Brazilian Federal Police is responsible by immigration issues.

Normative Resolution No. 77, 29.01.2008/ CNIG - National Immigration Council (D.O.U. 11/02/2008)

Temporary or permanent visa. Provides for criteria for the granting of temporary or permanent visa, or permission to stay, to partner, in marriage, without distinction of sex and repealing Administrative Resolution No. 5, December 3, 2003.

Resolution Regulations No-77, of 29 January 2008

Provides for criteria for the granting of temporary or permanent visa, or permission to stay, to partner, in marriage, without distinction of sex.

The National Immigration Council, instituted by Law no. 6815, to August 19, 1980, and organized by Law no. 10.683, of May 28, 2003, in exercise of the powers conferred by Decree Nr. 840, of June 22, 1993, resolves:

Article 1: Requests for temporary or permanent visa, or permission to stay for companion in marriage, without distinction of sex, should be examined under the terms of Normative Resolution No. 27 of November 25, 1998, concerning special situations or omissions, and the Normative Resolution No. 36, September 28, 1999, on family reunion.

Article 2: The proof of marriage must be made by one of the following documents:

I - certificate of marriage issued by the national government of the country of origin of the call, or;

II - Proof of marriage issued by the competent court in Brazil or corresponding authority abroad.

Article 3: In the absence of the documents referred to in art. 2, the proof of marriage must be made by submitting:

I - certificate or similar document issued by authority of the national civil registry, or foreign equivalent;

II - statement under penalty of law, two people attesting to the existence of a stable union, and;

III - at least two of the following documents:

a) evidence of dependence issued by the tax authority or body corresponding to the Revenue;

b) religious marriage certificate;

c) proving the testamentary dispositions bond;

d) life insurance policy in stating a party insurance as settlor and the other as beneficiary;

e) the deed of purchase and sale, registered with the joint property in setting out the parties as owners, or lease of property that appear as tenants, and;

f) joint bank account.

Sole Paragraph. For purposes of paragraphs "b" through "f" of section III of this article shall pay the minimum of one year.

Article 4: The claimant must also present:

I - application containing historical marriage law;

II - deed of commitment to maintenance, support and exit from national territory, if necessary, in favor of the call, done in registry;

III - Proof of means of subsistence of the claimant or the foreigner, with source in Brazil or abroad, sufficient for the maintenance and sustenance of both, or employment relationships, or even subsidies from scholarship, and other lawful means;

IV - certified copy of identity document of the claimant;

V - certified copy of passport of the call in its entirety;

VI - a certificate of criminal records issued by the country of origin or habitual residence of the call;

VII - proof of payment of individual immigration, and;

VIII - statement under penalty of law, the marital status of the foreigner in the country of origin.

Sole Paragraph. At the discretion of the competent authority, the claimant may be asked to provide other documents.

Article 5: Documents issued abroad must be legalized by a Brazilian consular office in the country and translated by a sworn translator in Brazil.

Article 6: If necessary, the National Immigration Council request the Ministry of Justice to court.

Article 7: In the case of a permanent visa or residence permit, foreigners remain bound to the condition that allowed its grant for a period of two years, and the condition contained in your passport and Alien ID card (CIE).

§ 1 The carrier permanently bound record under the caption may apply for indefinite stay by proving the continuity of stable union;

§ 2 Once the period referred to in the heading up to the Ministry of Justice to rule on the stay indefinitely in the foreign country;

§ 3 The request for the in § 1, after the time under the caption, subject the named to the penalty of a fine under clause sixteenth of art. 125 of Law No. 6815, 1980, as amended by Law no. 6964, to December 9, 1981.

Article 8: This Normative Resolution enters into force upon its publication, does not apply to cases already in progress.

Article 9: is repealed Administrative Resolution No. 05, December 3, 2003.

PAULO SÉRGIO DE ALMEIDA

President of the National Immigration Council

== See also ==
- LGBT rights in the Americas
- LGBT rights in Brazil
- Immigration to Brazil
- Immigration equality
- Immigration Equality (organization)
- Visa policy of Brazil
- Visa requirements for Brazilian citizens
