= Jordaan and Others v Minister of Home Affairs and Another =

South African legal case concerning surnames

Jordaan v Minister of Home Affairs
- Court: Constitutional Court of South Africa
- Full case name: Jordaan and Others v Minister of Home Affairs and Another
- Decided: 11 September 2025
- Citation: [2025] ZACC 19

Case history
- Prior action: Application for confirmation from Free State Division

Court membership
- Judges sitting: Madlanga ADCJ, Dambuza AJ, Kollapen J, Majiedt J, Mhlantla J, Opperman AJ, Rogers J, Theron J, Tshiqi J

Case opinions
- Section 26 of the Births and Deaths Registration Act is unconstitutional to the extent that it does not allow a man to assume the surname of his spouse.
- Decision by: Theron J (unanimous)

Jordaan and Others v Minister of Home Affairs and Another, [2025] ZACC 19, is a 2025 judgment of the Constitutional Court of South Africa which struck down as unconstitutional the provisions of the Births and Deaths Registration Act, 1992, which allowed a wife to assume her husband's surname, but did not allow a husband to assume his wife's surname or same-sex spouses to assume each other's surnames. The court's ruling, handed down on 11 September 2025, held that spouses must be allowed to assume each other's surnames regardless of their gender.

== Background ==
South African law does not generally allow people to change their surname as recorded on the national population register. Section 26(2) of the Births and Deaths Registration Act (BDRA) provides that an adult can only assume a new surname with the approval of the Director-General of Home Affairs, and regulations under the act restrict this approval to a limited set of circumstances.

There is however an exception in section 26(1) of BDRA which allows a married woman to adopt her husband's surname without approval. It also allows a married, divorced or widowed woman to resume a previous surname or hyphenate the marital surname with a previous surname. The law does not allow a married man to adopt his wife's surname, nor does it allow either spouse in a same-sex marriage to adopt the other spouse's surname. (Same-sex marriage has been legal in South Africa since 2006.)

== Case history ==
The applicants were two married couples. The Jordaans wanted the husband (né van der Merwe) to assume his wife's surname, while the Donnelly-Bornmans wanted to assume a double-barrelled surname. In both cases the Department of Home Affairs refused a change of surname for the husband, although Ms Donnelly-Bornman was allowed to change hers.

The Jordaans and the Donnelly-Bornmans applied to the Free State Division of the High Court to declare section 26(1) of BDRA (and the associated regulations) to be unconstitutional. They argued that the law discriminated unfairly on the basis of gender and consequently violated section nine of the Constitution. The Free State Society of Advocates joined the case as amicus curiae, supporting the applicants' arguments. The respondents in the case, the Minister of Home Affairs and the Minister of Justice and Constitutional Development, did not oppose the application. The case was heard by Judge Joseph Mhlambi on 29 August 2024. His judgment, delivered on 12 September 2024, declared the act and regulations to be unconstitutional and ordered the Department of Home Affairs to amend the surnames of the applicants.

When the High Court finds an act of parliament to be unconstitutional, that order has no effect unless it is confirmed by the Constitutional Court. The High Court's order was therefore referred to the Constitutional Court for confirmation.

== In the Constitutional Court ==
The application for confirmation was heard by the Constitutional Court on 4 March 2025 before acting Deputy Chief Justice Madlanga, judges Kollapen, Majiedt, Mhlantla, Rogers, Theron and Tshiqi, and acting judges Dambuza and Opperman. The unanimous judgment of the Constitutional Court, authored by Judge Theron, was delivered on 11 September 2025.

The respondent ministers did not oppose the application, and in their submissions they conceded that the act was unconstitutional and supported the confirmation of the High Court's order. In its judgment, the court noted that the regulation of surnames was a legitimate government purpose, but that this purpose is not served by the obvious gender differentiation. The court found that the law was based on patriarchal gender norms which assumed that a wife would always take her husband's surname. It therefore discriminated against men by preventing them from changing their surname; but also against women by preventing them from giving their surname to their family, and elevating a man's surname to a higher status than a woman's.. The conclusion was that the law violated the right to equality in section 9 of the constitution. The court found there was no justification for this violation in terms of section 36 of the constitution, and consequently the law was unconstitutional.

The court also considered international and foreign law, referring to the gender equality provisions of the International Covenant on Civil and Political Rights. The court considered the cases of Müller and Engelhard v. Namibia in the United Nations Human Rights Committee and Burghartz v. Switzerland in the European Court of Human Rights.

The final order of the court declared the provisions of section 26 of the BDRA to be unconstitutional but suspended the declaration for 24 months to allow Parliament to rectify the law. In the interim the court ordered that gender-neutral terms be read in to section 26(1), so that the right of a wife to adopt her husband's surname is extended to all spouses.

== Reactions ==
The judgment was criticised by traditional leaders who argued that it was contrary to African culture and tradition, and undermined traditional succession practices. Responses to these criticisms pointed out that the changing of surname was optional, that some cultural groups already allowed men to adopt women's surnames, and that surnames themselves were a colonial imposition on African culture.
