= Immigration equality =

Immigration equality is a citizens' equal ability or right to immigrate their family members. It also applies to fair and equal execution of the laws and the rights of non-citizens regardless of nationality or where they are coming from. Immigration issues can also be an LGBT rights issue, as government recognition of same-sex relationships vary from country to country.

== Immigration and migrant rights issue ==
In 1999, President Bill Clinton sent a bill to Congress that would have equalized immigration rights for people from Central America and Haiti. Clinton said the bill would correct the imbalance in immigration laws that gave advantage to people who fled communist regimes such as Cuba and Nicaragua. Like Nicaraguans and Cubans, many Salvadorans, Guatemalans, Hondurans and Haitians fled human rights abuses or unstable political economic conditions in the 1980s and 1990s, but the latter received unequal treatment that granted to the Nicaraguans and Cubans. The "Central American and Haitian Parity Act of 1999" never passed, but would have offered immigration equality protections to migrants from Haiti, El Salvador, Guatemala and Honduras.

Haitians particularly sought immigration equality in the Elián González affair in 2000 when they organized demonstrations in Miami during an international tug of war between Cuba and the US. They protested what they said was discrimination against Haitian immigrants by the INS and the behavior of elected officials who lobbied for Elián González to stay in the US, yet ignored the plight of Haitian refugees and the repatriation of Haitian children.

In 2004, The United Nations High Commissioner for Refugees, UNHCR, expressed concern about the plight of the Haitian people as the country was sliding further into chaos. Cuba, Jamaica and Canada said they will not send people back to Haiti, but President George W. Bush warned Haitians they will be sent home if they try to flee to the US. In a matter of a few days, the US Coast Guard intercepted some 500 people in boats fleeing Haiti and sent them back. The US was not sending back Cubans fleeing similar situations and regimes, and many argue that immigration equality rights between the two nationalities should apply.

In 2006, protests continued for immigration equality rights for the Haitians as Lawyers protest Deportation of Illegal Immigrants to Haiti.

== LGBT immigration issues ==
=== United States ===
Until 2013, LGBT Americans were not afforded the same rights and responsibilities under current immigration law as their heterosexual counterparts. The Defense of Marriage Act (DOMA) had forbidden the federal government from conferring any benefits upon same-sex couples. Under DOMA, persons in same-sex marriages were not considered married for immigration purposes. U.S. citizens and permanent residents in same-sex marriages could not petition for their spouses, nor could they be accompanied by their spouses into the U.S. on the basis of a family or employment-based visa. A non-citizen in such a marriage would not have been able to use it as the basis for obtaining a waiver or relief from removal from the U.S. On June 26, 2013, the Supreme Court ruled in United States v. Windsor that Section 3 of the Defense of Marriage Act is unconstitutional. Following this decision, the administration of President Barack Obama began recognizing same-sex couples for immigration purposes.

Legislation to establish immigration equality, the Uniting American Families Act, has been introduced in the US Congress since 2000.

Since 2003, fear of persecution has been increasingly accepted as grounds for granting asylum to LGBT persons. The Board of Immigration Appeals denied an application for asylum on the part of a gay Indonesian man, as his homosexuality was used as a reason to fire him from his job, and a reason to deny his job applications elsewhere in his field. The BIA doubted his fear of persecution if he returned to Indonesia in part because "closeted homosexuality is tolerated in Indonesia". The case, Kadri v. Mukasey, was on appeal to the First Circuit Court of Appeals, where the decision was overturned and the man was granted asylum based on economic persecution.

=== Worldwide ===
LGBT immigration equality by country or territory Recognition of same-sex couples in national immigration laws Unknown/ambiguous

At present a number of countries recognise same-sex relationships for immigration purposes. This may occur through the recognition of same-sex marriage, through some other form of registered relationship, or through specific provisions made in immigration law. These countries are:

- Argentina (2010)
- Australia (1995)
- Austria (2010)
- Belgium (1997)
- Brazil (2003)
- Canada (2005)
- Chile (2015)
- Denmark (1989) [including Greenland (1996)]
- Finland (2001)
- France (1999)
- Germany (2001)
- Greece (2015)
- Iceland (1996)
- Ireland (2011)
- Israel (2000)
- Italy (2016)
- Hong Kong (2018)
- Luxembourg (2004)
- Mexico (2010)
- Namibia (1998)
- Netherlands (2001)
- New Zealand (1999)
- Norway (1993)
- Portugal (2001)
- Romania (2006)
- San Marino (2012)
- Slovakia
- South Africa (1999)
- Spain (2005)
- Sweden (1994)
- Switzerland (2003)
- Taiwan (2019)
- United Kingdom (1997) [including Jersey (2012), Isle of Man (2011), Gibraltar (2014) and Bermuda (2015)]
- United States (2013)
- Uruguay (2013)

=== LGBT immigration organizations ===
There are organizations in various countries that deal with LGBT/HIV+ immigration issues and represent LGBT/HIV+ people in legal immigration applications.

- Netherlands
  - Love Exiles
- United States
  - Immigration Equality, an organization advocating for equality under United States immigration law for LGBT and HIV+ individuals, founded in 1994 as the Lesbian and Gay Immigration Rights Task Force. Immigration Equality also maintains a list of LGBT/HIV-friendly private immigration attorneys, and provides technical assistance to attorneys working on sexual orientation, transgender identity, or HIV status-based asylum applications, or other immigration applications where the client's LGBT or HIV-positive identity is at issue in the case.
  - Out4Immigration is a volunteer grassroots organization in the United States that supports LGBT and HIV+ people whose lives have been impacted by discriminatory US immigration laws, through education, outreach, advocacy and maintaining a resource and support network. They work with the National Center for Lesbian Rights' Immigration Project to provide a monthly free clinic where participants can consult an immigration attorney to discuss their cases.
  - National Center For Lesbian Rights, founded in 1977, is a non-profit, public interest law firm in the United States that works to advance the civil and human rights of LGBT people and their families through litigation, public policy advocacy, and public education.

== See also ==
- Same-sex immigration policy in Brazil
- National Coalition for Gay and Lesbian Equality v Minister of Home Affairs
