= Larbi-Odam v MEC for Education (North-West Province) =

South African legal case

- Court: Constitutional Court of South Africa
- Full case name: Larbi-Odam and Others v the Member of the Executive Council for Education (North-West Province) and Another
- Decided: 26 November 1997
- Citations: [1997] ZACC 16, 1997 (12) BCLR 1655, 1998 (1) SA 745

Case history
- Appealed from: Bophuthatswana Division

Court membership
- Judges sitting: Chaskalson P, Langa DP, Ackermann, Didcott, Goldstone, Kriegler, Madala, Mokgoro, O'Regan & Sachs JJ

Case opinions
- Decision by: Mokgoro

Keywords
- employment discrimination; equality; immigrants' rights

Larbi-Odam v MEC for Education (North-West Province) is a 1997 judgment of the Constitutional Court of South Africa which held that a government policy forbidding the employment of non-citizens (including permanent residents) in permanent teaching positions, was unconstitutional. Although citizenship is not one of the prohibited grounds for discrimination listed in the equality clause of South Africa's Constitution, the court found unanimously that in this case discrimination against non-citizens was unfair. It came to this decision because non-citizens are necessarily a minority with little political power, and because citizenship is a personal attribute which is difficult to change.
