= Minister of Health v New Clicks: in re Application for Declaratory Relief =

South African legal case

- Court: Constitutional Court
- Full case name: Minister of Health & another v New Clicks SA (Pty) Ltd & others
- Argued: 15 March 2005
- Decided: 30 September 2005
- Citation: [2006] JOL 17488 (CC)

Court membership
- Judges sitting: Chaskalson CJ, Langa DCJ, Madala J, Mokgoro J, Moseneke J, Ngcobo J, O'Regan J, Sachs J, Skweyiya J, Van der Westhuizen J, Yacoob J

Case opinions
- Decision by: Chaskalson CJ

Keywords
- Constitutional Law, Direct access, Invalidity of regulations, Application to suspend, Decision of Supreme Court of Appeal, Better placed to decide suspension, Application dismissed

Minister of Health & another v New Clicks SA (Pty) Ltd & others: in re Application for Declaratory Relief is an important case in South African law, with significance especially in the areas of civil procedure and constitutional law.

== Facts ==
The Supreme Court of Appeal (SCA) had set aside regulations relating to a transparent pricing system for medicines and scheduled substances. The Minister of Health, Manto Tshabalala-Msimang sought leave to appeal against that decision to the Constitutional Court. As a result of the application, both parties published conflicting statements about its effect. Members of the Department of Health made various remarks in the media to the effect that the filing of the application for leave to appeal had the effect of suspending the order of the SCA. Furthermore, the regulations were valid; stakeholders were expected to comply with them. Representatives of the pharmaceutical industry, the respondents, retaliated with a press statement to the effect that the mere lodging of an application for leave to appeal does not suspend the order of the SCA.

As a result of the conflicting statements, the Minister launched this application for declaratory relief to the effect that the SCA order had been automatically suspended by the application for leave to appeal. Together with their answering affidavit the respondents lodged a conditional counter-application. The thrust of their opposition was that the question of declaratory relief was not incidental to the main relief sought (that is, leave to appeal), and that the application should properly be considered as direct access.

== Judgment ==
The court held that the application was in substance an application for direct access. The court had stressed on more than one occasion that applications for direct access should be granted only in exceptional circumstances. In effect the Minister was asking for an order to suspend the declaration of invalidity. This is an order that should be made, as the Constitution contemplates in section 172(1)(b), by the court making the declaration of invalidity. In this case, the order could have been made by the SCA. It was best placed to determine what was just and equitable in the circumstances.

The application for direct access was therefore dismissed.

== See also ==
- South African civil procedure
- South African constitutional law
