= Gory v Kolver NO =

South African legal case

- Court: Constitutional Court of South Africa
- Full case name: Gory v Kolver NO and Others (Starke and Others Intervening)
- Decided: 23 November 2006
- Citations: [2006] ZACC 20, 2007 (4) SA 97 (CC); 2007 (3) BCLR 249 (CC)

Case history
- Appealed from: Transvaal Provincial Division [2006] ZAGPHC 28

Court membership
- Judges sitting: Langa CJ, Moseneke DCJ, Madala, Mokgoro, O'Regan, Sachs, Van der Westhuizen & Yacoob JJ, Kondile & Van Heerden AJ

Case opinions
- Decision by: Acting Justice Van Heerden

Keywords
- same-sex unions, intestate succession

Gory v Kolver NO (in full Gory v Kolver NO and Others (Starke and Others Intervening)) is a decision of the Constitutional Court of South Africa which ruled that a same-sex life partner was entitled to inherit the estate of the other partner who died intestate.

Gory and Brooks were in a permanent same-sex life partnership, and had had a symbolic ceremony similar to a wedding to express their intention to be together for the rest of their lives. Mark Gory sought to be recognised as the sole intestate heir of his late same-sex partner, Henry Harrison Brooks, who had died intestate on April 30, 2005, without leaving a spouse or descendants. The court's decision was predicated on the fact that Gory and Brooks had not had the option of formalising their partnership.

The court ruled that the Intestate Succession Act, 1987, which granted the right of intestate succession to spouses but not to same-sex life partners, unfairly discriminated on the basis of sexual orientation. The Act was therefore invalid because it violated section 9 of the Constitution. To rectify the unconstitutionality, the court read the words "or partner in a permanent same-sex life partnership in which the partners have undertaken reciprocal duties of support" into section 1(1) of the Act after the word "spouse."

The court had already ruled in Minister of Home Affairs v Fourie that marriage had to be extended to same-sex couples; however, the order in that case was suspended for one year to allow Parliament to rectify the inequality. The Gory case came before the courts during this one-year period; indeed, the Constitutional Court's final decision was handed down only seven days before the Civil Union Act became law. In its judgment the Court indicated that rights extended to unmarried same-sex couples by judicial decisions would not automatically be removed when same-sex marriage became legal, though Parliament would be able to modify them by legislation.
