= Rafoneke v Minister of Justice and Correctional Services =

South African legal case

- Court: Constitutional Court of South Africa
- Full case name: Rafoneke and Others v Minister of Justice and Correctional Services and Others
- Decided: 2 August 2022
- Docket nos.: CCT 315/21, CCT 321/21, CCT 06/22
- Citations: [2022] ZACC 29; 2022 (6) SA 27 (CC); 2022 (12) BCLR 1489 (CC)

Case history
- Prior actions: Rafoneke v Minister of Justice and Correctional Services and Others [2021] ZAFSHC 229 [2022] 1 All SA 243 (FB); 2022 (1) SA 610 (FB) in the High Court of South Africa, Free State Division

Court membership
- Judges sitting: Kollapen J, Madlanga J, Majiedt J, Mathopo J, Mhlantla J, Tshiqi J, Mlambo AJ and Unterhalter AJ

Case opinions
- It is constitutionally permissible for the Legal Practice Act, 2014 to restrict admission and enrolment into the legal profession to South African citizens and permanent residents.
- Decision by: Tshiqi J (unanimous)

Keywords
- Discrimination on the basis of citizenship; Legal Practice Act, 2014; section 9 of the Constitution; unfair discrimination

Rafoneke and Others v Minister of Justice and Correctional Services and Others is a 2022 decision of the Constitutional Court of South Africa concerning the right of foreign citizens to be admitted and enrolled as legal practitioners in South Africa. The court dismissed a challenge to the constitutionality of section 24(2) of the Legal Practice Act, 2014, which the applicants contended was unconstitutional insofar as it restricted that right to South African citizens and permanent residents. It held unanimously that section 24(2) did not meet the test for unfair discrimination.

The matter was heard on 24 February 2022 and decided on 2 August 2022. The judgment was written by Justice Zukisa Tshiqi.

== Background ==
Section 24(2) of the Legal Practice Act, 2014 restricts the right to be admitted and enrolled as a legal practitioner in South Africa to South African citizens and permanent residents.

In September 2021, the Free State Division of the High Court of South Africa issued a declaratory order finding that section 24(2) was unconstitutional and invalid to the extent that it does not allow foreigners to be admitted and authorised to be enrolled as non-practising legal practitioners. With Judge President Cagney Musi writing for a unanimous bench, the High Court held that it constitutes unfair discrimination for the state to bar foreign citizens from being admitted as legal practitioners, though it is not unfair to prohibit them from practicing law in South Africa.

== Reactions ==
The International Commission of Jurists and Lawyers for Human Rights expressed disappointment in the judgment, and Pierre de Vos criticised it for misapplying the test for unfair discrimination and for ignoring the xenophobic overtones of the legislation and of the state's argument.
