= South African insolvency law =

Handling of persons who are unable to pay their debts

Insolvency in South African law refers to a status of diminished legal capacity (capitis diminutio) imposed by the courts on persons who are unable to pay their debts, or (which amounts to the same thing) whose liabilities exceed their assets. The insolvent's diminished legal capacity entails deprivation of certain of his important legal capacities and rights, in the interests of protecting other persons, primarily the general body of existing creditors, but also prospective creditors. Insolvency is also of benefit to the insolvent, in that it grants him relief in certain respects.

In broad and everyday terms, a person is insolvent when he is unable to pay his debts. In legal terms, however, the test for insolvency is whether or not the debtor's liabilities, fairly estimated, exceed his assets, fairly valued. Inability to pay debts is, at most, merely evidence, and in itself, of insolvency.

A person who has insufficient assets to discharge his liabilities, although he satisfies the test for insolvency, is not treated as insolvent for legal purposes unless his estate has been sequestrated by an order of court. A sequestration order is a formal declaration that a debtor is insolvent. The order is granted either at the instance of the debtor himself (voluntary surrender) or at the instance of one or more of the debtor's creditors (compulsory sequestration).

The term “sequestration” should be used only with reference to a person's estate. It is the debtor's estate that is sequestrated, not the debtor himself. On the other by, both the debtor's estate and the debtor himself may properly be described as insolvent.

When the word “insolvent” is used to describe a debtor, it carries two possible meanings—either

1. that the debtor's estate has been sequestrated; or
2. that his liabilities exceed his assets.

The notion of “becoming insolvent,” therefore, has a wider meaning than “being sequestrated.”

== Purpose of a sequestration order ==
The main purpose of a sequestration order is to score the orderly and equitable distribution of a debtor's assets where they are insufficient to meet the claims of all his creditors.

Executing against the property of a debtor who is in insolvent circumstances inevitably results in one or a few creditors being paid, and the rest receiving little or nothing at all. The legal machinery which comes into operation on sequestration is designed to ensure that whatever assets the debtor has are liquidated and distributed among all his creditors in accordance with a predetermined (and fair) order of preference.

The law proceeds from the premise that, once an order of sequestration is granted, a concursus creditorum (a “coming together of the creditors”) is established, and that the interests of creditors as a group enjoy preference over the interests of individual creditors.

The debtor is divested of his estate, and may not burden it with any further debts. A creditor's right to recover his claim in full by judicial proceedings is replaced by his right, on proving a claim against the insolvent estate, to share with all other proved creditors in the proceeds of the estate assets.

Apart from what is permitted in the Act, nothing may be done which would have the effect of diminishing the estate assets or prejudicing the rights of creditors.

“The object of the Act,” held the court in Walker v Syfret NO, “is to ensure a due distribution of assets among creditors in the order of their preference [...]. The sequestration order crystallises the insolvent’s position; the hand of the law is laid upon the estate, and at once the rights of the general body of creditors have to be taken into consideration. No transaction can thereafter be entered into with regard to estate matters by a single creditor to the prejudice of the general body. The claim of each creditor must be dealt with as it existed at the issue of the order.”

== Core concepts ==
The Act provides that the “estate” of a “debtor” may be sequestrated.

=== Estate ===
An estate is usually described as a collection of assets and liabilities, but a debtor who has only liabilities may be regarded as having an estate for sequestration purposes.

=== Debtor ===
A “debtor,” for the purposes of the Act, is “a person or a partnership, or the estate of a person or partnership, which is a debtor in the usual sense of the word, except a body corporate or a company or other association of persons which may be placed in liquidation under the law relating to companies.”

An entity or association of persons is regarded as “a debtor in the usual sense of the word” if it is able to possess an estate and incur debts. The entities that may be placed in liquidation under the Companies Act are

- a company;
- an “external” company; and
- “any other body corporate.”

“Body corporate” in this context refers to a juristic person or universitas.

The term “debtor” therefore embraces the following:

- a natural person;
- a partnership (even one whose members are all juristic persons);
- a deceased person and a person incapable of managing his own affairs;
- an external company that does not fall within the definition of “external company” in the Companies Act (like a foreign company that has not established a place of business in the country); and
- an entity or association of persons that is not a juristic person, such as a trust.

== Jurisdiction of the court ==
Only a Provincial Division, or a Local Division of the High Court, may adjudicate on an insolvency matter. (In certain instances, though, a Magistrate's Court has jurisdiction, such as in prosecutions for criminal offences under the Act.)

In terms of section 149, a court has jurisdiction “over a debtor and in regard to the estate of a debtor”

- if, on the date when the application for voluntary surrender or compulsory sequestration of the debtor's estate is lodged with the registrar of the court, the debtor is domiciled, or owns the property, or is entitled to property, situated within the jurisdiction of the court; or
- if, at any time within the twelve months immediately preceding the lodging of the application, the debtor ordinarily resided or carried on business within the jurisdiction of the court.

== Constitutional overview ==
The Constitution provides a basis for the reform of all South African law. It is supreme law and contains a Bill of Rights, against which the validity of all laws may be tested.

Insolvency laws pose a potential threat to a number of fundamental rights, like the right to equality, freedom and security of the person, privacy, access to information, property and administrative action.

The Constitutional Court has been called upon to consider the constitutional validity of several insolvency provisions, like

- section 21 of the Insolvency Act, 1936 (upheld in Harksen v Lane); and
- section 66(3) of the Insolvency Act, 1936 (held in De Lange v Smuts NO to be invalid to the extent that it empowered a presiding officer at an interrogation who is not a judge or magistrate to issue a warrant of committal to prison).

The issue of constitutional invalidity involves a two-fold enquiry:

1. Does the provision conflict with a fundamental right?
2. If it does, is the limitation reasonable and justifiable in an open and democratic society based on human dignity, equality and freedom?

To decide the latter issue, account must be taken of all the relevant factors, including

- the nature of the right;
- the importance of the purpose of the limitation;
- the nature and extent of the limitation;
- the relation between the limitation and its purpose; and
- less restrictive means to achieve the purpose.

Only if the provision is neither reasonable nor justifiable, taking all pertinent factors into consideration, may the conclusion be drawn that it is unconstitutional.

== Condonation of irregularities or non-compliance with formalities ==
Sometimes a party making an application, or taking a step in terms of the Act, will omit prescribed details, or fail to act within the time stipulated, or commit some other procedural breach. When this happens, it is important to establish whether what has been done is invalid by reason of the defect or irregularity.

The starting point is section 157(1), which provides that “nothing done under the Act will be invalid by reason of a formal defect or irregularity, unless a substantial injustice has been thereby done, which in the opinion of the court cannot be remedied by any order of the court.” The effect of this is the following:

- If a formal defect has not caused a substantial injustice, the procedural step in question is valid. It is said that the court may condone the defect in these circumstances, but this seems incorrect, since section 157 does not confer on the court the power to condone defects.
- If a formal defect has caused a substantial injustice, but the prejudice to creditors can, in the opinion of the court, be remedied by an appropriate order, then the defect is not fatal—provided, of course, that the party concerned complies with the corrective order.
- If a formal defect has resulted in a substantial injustice, and the prejudice to creditors cannot be cured by any order of the court, then the procedural step is invalid.

== Procedure ==
There are two ways in which a debtor's estate may be sequestrated:

1. A creditor or creditors (or their agent) may apply to court for the sequestration of the debtor's estate (s 9(1)). This is called compulsory sequestration.
2. The debtor himself (or his agent) may apply to court for acceptance of the surrender of his estate (s 3(1)). This is known as voluntary surrender.

The procedure and requirements for each method differ in material respects (although the consequences of the sequestration order are same in both instances).

=== Voluntary surrender ===
An application by the debtor for the sequestration of his estate for the benefit of creditors is termed a "voluntary surrender" of the estate. A court may accept the surrender if the debtor proves, among other things, that his liabilities exceed his assets. The debtor's aim in surrendering the estate is, as a rule, to escape a financial position which has become intolerable. It has been pointed out, though, that "the machinery of voluntary surrender was primarily designed for the benefit of creditors, and not for the relief of harassed debtors." The court, therefore, has to be satisfied that the surrender will be to the advantage of creditors.

==== Who may apply? ====
The following persons may apply to surrender the estates mentioned:

- In the case of the estate of a natural person, the debtor himself or his agent may apply. If an agent applies, he must be expressly authorised to do so.
- In the case of the estate of a deceased debtor, the executor may apply.
- In the case of the estate of a debtor who is incapable of managing his own affairs, the party entrusted with administering the estate may apply.
- In the case of a partnership estate, all the members of the partnership who reside in the Republic, or their agent, may apply.
- In the case of the joint estate of spouses married in community of property, both spouses may apply.

==== Requirements ====
The court may accept the surrender of a debtor's estate only if it is satisfied

- that the debtor's estate is, in fact, insolvent;
- that the debtor owns realisable property of sufficient value to defray all costs of the sequestration, which will, in terms of the Act, be payable out of the free residue of his estate; and
- that sequestration will be to the advantage of creditors.

In addition, the court must be satisfied that certain preliminary formalities have been observed.

===== Debtor’s estate insolvent =====
A debtor is insolvent if the amount of his total liabilities exceeds the value of all his assets.

The extent of the debtor's assets and liabilities is generally determined by reference to the statement of affairs which he is required to prepare and file, but the court is not bound by the valuations in the statement; it may make a finding of insolvency even where the statement indicates that his assets exceed his liabilities.

The test is whether it is established that the debtor is without funds to pay his debts in full, and whether it is improbable that the assets will realise enough for this purpose.

===== Free residue sufficient to pay costs of sequestration =====
The “costs of sequestration” include the costs not only of surrender but also of all the general costs of administration.

“Free residue” is defined in section 2 as “that portion of the estate which is not subject to any right of preference by reason of any special mortgage, legal hypothec, pledge or right of retention.” It includes the balance of the proceeds of encumbered property after discharge of the encumbrances.

For the purpose of calculating the amount of free residue in an estate, therefore, the surplus in value of encumbered assets over the amount of the encumbrances must be taken into consideration. “It is necessary,” the court held in Ex parte Van Heerden, “to consider whether the surplus of the proceeds of the immovable property, after satisfying the mortgage bonds which have a preferential claim thereon, can be considered as ‘free residue’ within the meaning of that expression as used in the Act.” The definition of “free residue” must be taken to refer to that portion of an estate under sequestration when liquidated, which is not subject to any right of preference. In estimating the free residue in an estate, the surplus in value of immovable property over the amount of mortgage bonds thereon may be included in such estimate.

Goods bought by the debtor under an instalment-sale transaction also form part of the free residue, to the extent that their market value exceeds the balance outstanding in terms of the transaction.

A logical result of the requirement that the debtor must own sufficient property to meet the costs of sequestration is that a debtor who has no assets, only liabilities, cannot surrender his estate.

If it is clear that the free residue is insufficient, the court must refuse the application. The insufficiency cannot be cured by the furnishing of a guarantee, since the guarantee does not have the effect of creating an asset in the debtor's estate. If, however, it is uncertain whether the free residue is sufficient, the court may grant the application, provided a guarantee for costs has been furnished. The guarantee in such a case is regarded as removing the uncertainty.

===== Sequestration to be to advantage of creditors =====
The debtor has to prove that sequestration will be to the advantage of creditors, whereas, in an application for compulsory sequestration, the creditor has to show merely that there is reason to believe that it will be. The onus, then, is more strenuous in the case of voluntary surrender than in the case of compulsory sequestration.

One reason for this is that a debtor can normally be expected to provide a detailed account of his own financial position, whereas a sequestrating creditor would generally not have access to this information.

Another reason is to reduce the ever-present risk of the debtor abusing the sequestration procedure and resorting to sequestration when it holds little or no real benefit for creditors and simply gives the debtor a means of escaping his liabilities.

==== Preliminary formalities ====
The steps which must be followed prior to the application for surrender are set out in section 4. Formal defects do not necessarily invalidate the application.

===== Notice of intention to surrender =====
The first step to be taken by a debtor who wishes to surrender his estate is the publication of a notice of surrender in the Government Gazette and in a newspaper circulating in the magisterial district where he resides (or, if he is a trader, a newspaper circulating in the district where he has his principal place of business). The notice must comply substantially with Form A, and must state

- the full names, address and occupation of the debtor;
- the date upon which, and the particular division of the High Court before which, the application for acceptance of the surrender will be made; and
- when and where the debtor's statement of affairs will lie for inspection as required by the Act.

The purpose of the notice is to alert all creditors of the intended application, in case they should wish to oppose it. It follows that the notice must be published in a newspaper in the usual sense. What if the newspaper was published in Hebrew and was devoted only to Jewish interests, as in Ex parte Goldman? The answer is that this would not suffice. The newspaper must be one which caters to general interests.

What if all the creditors are in KwaZulu Natal (KZN), but the debtor has just moved to the Western Cape, as in Ex parte Barton? The court held that it should be published in KZN, since its purpose is to notify the creditors.

Publication of the notice of surrender may be proved by means of an affidavit enclosing copies of the relevant Government Gazette and newspaper.

====== Time limits ======
Publication of the notice in the Government Gazette and newspaper must take place not more than thirty days, and not less than fourteen days, before the date stated in the notice as the date for the hearing of the application.

The purpose of the fourteen-day time limit is to ensure that creditors have sufficient opportunity to peruse the statement of affairs and to decide whether or not to oppose the application. The legislature's objective in imposing the thirty-day limit was to ensure that debtors would not be able to give long notice, months beforehand, and in that way to keep creditors from levying execution and in the meantime dissipate all their assets. Failure to adhere strictly to the third-day time period has mostly been taken to be fatal to the application. In Ex parte Harmse, the court held that the failure is a formal defect or irregularity, as envisaged by section 157(1), and therefore does not invalidate the application unless it has caused a substantial injustice which cannot be remedied by a court order.

===== Notice to creditors and other parties =====
Within seven days of publication of the notice of surrender, the debtor must furnish copies of the notice all to creditors whose addresses are known, and to other parties, including employees. Compliance with this requirement may be proved by means of an affidavit (made either by the debtor or by his attorney) giving details of the steps taken.

====== Notice to each creditor ======
The debtor must deliver a copy of the notice to every one of his creditors. The object of this requirement is to provide further protection to creditors who may wish to contest the application or take steps to safeguard their interests. Failure to do this may be fatal to the application, although courts may be prepared to condone non-compliance with the time period.

====== Notice to trade union and employees ======
The debtor must post a copy of the notice to every registered trade union that represents his employees. In addition, the debtor must give notice to the employees themselves. Notice must be given to the employees on a notice board, if the employees have access to such, or on the front gate or door of the debtor's business premises, and must be posted to the trade unions that represent the employees.

====== Notice to SARS ======
The debtor is further required to send a copy of the notice by post to the South African Revenue Service (SARS).

===== Preparation and lodging of statement of affairs =====
====== Preparation of statement ======
The statement of affairs referred to in the notice of surrender must be framed substantially in accordance with Form B in the First Schedule. It comprises the following:

- a balance sheet;
- a list of immovable assets, with the estimated value of each asset and details of any mortgages on the assets—Annexure I;
- a list of any movable property not included in Annexures III or V (see below), setting out the value of each asset mentioned—Annexure II;
- a list of debtors with their residential and postal addresses, details of each debt, and an estimate of the extent to which the debts are “good,” or “bad or doubtful”—Annexure III;
- a list of creditors, their addresses, and particulars of each claim and any security held for it—Annexure IV;
- a list of any movable assets pledged, hypothecated, subject to a lien, or under attachment in execution of a judgment—Annexure V;
- a list and description of every accounting book used by the debtor at the time of the notice of surrender or sequestration or at the time when he ceased to carry on business—Annexure VI;
- a detailed statement of the causes of the debtor's insolvency—Annexure VI;
- certain personal information about the debtor, including details of any prior insolvency and rehabilitation—Annexure VIII; and
- an affidavit, made by the debtor (or the person applying on his behalf), verifying that the statement of affairs is true and complete and that every estimated amount contained in it is fairly and correctly estimated.

The Master may, on receiving the statement of affairs, specially direct the applicant to have any property mentioned in it valued by a sworn appraiser or a person designated by the Master for this purpose (s 4(4)). The court may, when considering the application for surrender, call for an independent valuation (Ex parte Prins & another 1921 CPD 616). In the absence of any direction by the Master or the court, the debtor is not legally obliged to obtain an independent valuation in support of the values given in his statement (if he does so unnecessarily, the cost of the appraisement will not be allowed as part of the costs of the sequestration: Ex parte Kruger 1947 (2) SA 130 (SWA)), but he may effectively be compelled to do this if he relies on the anticipated proceeds of a single asset to show that sequestration will be to the advantage of creditors. In Ex parte Anthony en ‘n ander en ses soortgelyke aansoeke 2000 (4) SA 116 (C), it was held that an applicant who relies on the fact that he has immovable property which can be sold for the benefit of his creditors must include evidence from an expert proving the likely proceeds of the property in a forced sale (see also Ex parte Mattysen et uxor (First Rand Bank Ltd intervening) 2003 (2) SA 308 (T) 312; Ex parte Bouwer and similar applications (supra) 388—9; Investec Bank Ltd & another v Mutemeri & another 2010 (1) SA 265 (GSJ) 271; Naidoo & another v Matlala NO & others 2012 (1) SA 143 (GNP) 155).

In the case of the simultaneous surrender of a partnership estate and the private estate of a partner, a separate statement of affairs for each estate must be prepared (see 20.1). The costs of preparing the statement of affairs are part of the costs of sequestration and are, therefore, payable out of the estate.

====== Lodging of statement ======
The statement of affairs, with supporting documents, must be lodged in duplicate at the Master's Office (s 4(3)). If the debtor resides or carries on business in a magisterial district in which there is no Master's Office, he must lodge an additional copy of the statement at the office of the magistrate of that district (s 4(5)). This latter requirement does not apply to a debtor residing in the district of Wynberg, Simonstown or Bellville in the Western Cape. The statement of affairs must lie for inspection by creditors at all times during office hours for a period of 14 days stated in the notice of surrender (s 4(6)). On expiry of the inspection period, the Master and the magistrate (where the statement has lain with him) each issues a certificate to the effect that the statement has duly lain for inspection as advertised in the notice of surrender, and whether any objections have been lodged with him by creditors. This certificate must be filed with the Registrar before the application is heard.

In Ex parte Viviers et uxor (Sattar intervening) 2001 (3) SA 240 (T), the court accepted that a debtor who has already made an unsuccessful attempt to surrender his estate may lodge the same statement of affairs that he used in the earlier abortive application, provided the relevant facts and reasons for the surrender remained unchanged. In the court's view, in the absence of any provision in the Act or other authority providing a legal impediment to the same material facts being used more than once, there was no reason why the debtor could not reuse his previous statement of affairs.

===== Application for surrender =====
An application for surrender is brought by way of notice of motion, supported by affidavit. The purpose of the founding affidavit is to convince the court of the substantive requirements and show that the preliminary procedural requirements have been met.

The application should be filed with the court prior to the application; the applicant may not simply turn up with it on date of application. It must be on the roll.

A copy of the application must be given to the “consulting party” where the debtor is a business owner. The consulting party will usually be a trade union. The consulting party must be given a full copy of the application, not just a notice of motion.

Should a creditor wish to oppose the application, he must deliver opposing affidavits prior to the hearing of the application (although they may be accepted on the day, depending on the circumstances); the debtor may then deliver replying affidavits.

The court, on hearing the application, may

- accept the surrender (in which case debtor is declared insolvent);
- refuse the surrender (in which case the debtor is restored to his position prior to the publication of the notice of surrender, which means that the stay of execution no longer applies, and that creditors may execute against the debtor); or
- postpone the matter.

The court has a discretion regarding the above. Specifically, even if all the requirements are met, the court still has a discretion to refuse the application, as in the case, for example, of abuse of process, or when it will not be to the advantage of creditors, because there are not enough assets to cover the liabilities. Another example is Ex parte Logan.

==== Effect of notice of surrender ====
===== Stay of sales in execution =====
After publication of the notice in the Government Gazette, it is unlawful for the sheriff to sell any property in the estate which has been attached under a writ of execution, or other similar process, unless the sheriff could not have known of the publication. The court may, however, order the sale of attached property to proceed if the value of the property does not exceed R5,000, and if it would be to the benefit of the creditors. Other civil proceedings may continue. For example, writs may still be granted.

No period is fixed for the duration of the prohibition, but it would seem that it continues until the day that the application is adjudicated on by the court.

Publication of a notice of surrender has no effect on other civil and criminal proceedings. They may proceed. Attachment of execution of judgments may be made, even though the actual sale in execution is stayed.

===== Curator bonis may be appointed =====
Notwithstanding the publication of a notice of surrender, the debtor is still at liberty to deal with his property as he chooses. He may, for example, sell it or pass a mortgage bond over it.

As a safeguard against the debtor's dissipating his assets after publishing a notice of surrender, the Master may appoint a curator bonis to the debtor's estate. The idea here would be to prevent a suspicious debtor (suspicious, that is, to the Master) from dissipating his assets.

The curator is then obliged to take the estate into his custody and assume control of any business or undertaking of the debtor, as the Master may direct.

The estate remains vested in the debtor, since the curator is only in the position of a caretaker. He is required to open a bank account and is subject to the same provisions in this regard as a trustee.

===== Potential compulsory sequestration =====
If, after having published a notice of surrender, the debtor fails to lodge a statement of his affairs, or lodges a statement which is incorrect or incomplete in a material respect, or fails to make application to court on the appointed day, and the notice of surrender is not properly withdrawn, the debtor commits an act of insolvency which entitles a creditor to apply for the compulsory sequestration of his estate.

===== No withdrawal of notice without consent =====
A notice of surrender, published in the Government Gazette, cannot be withdrawn without the written consent of the Master. The debtor may apply to the Master for his consent, and the Master is obliged to give it if it appears to him

- that the notice was published in good faith; and
- that there is good cause for its withdrawal.

Withdrawal takes effect upon publication of a notice of withdrawal, together with the Master's consent in the Government Gazette and in the newspaper in which the notice was published.

===== Lapse of notice of surrender =====
The notice of surrender lapses

- if the court does not accept the surrender;
- if the notice of surrender is properly withdrawn in terms of the Act; or
- if the debtor fails to make the application for surrender within fourteen days after the date advertised as the date of the hearing of the application.

If a curator bonis has been appointed to look after the debtor's assets, control of the estate must be restored to the debtor as soon as the Master is satisfied that sufficient provision has been made for the payment of all costs incurred by the curator.

==== Court’s discretion ====
Even if the court is satisfied that the requirements have been met and that the preliminary formalities observed, it still has a discretion to reject the surrender. The following are examples of factors that may influence the court towards refusing the application:

- The debtor displayed gross extravagance and ran up debts on a pretentious scale, even after judgment had been granted against him (Ex parte Logan).
- The debtor's creditors are being accommodating, not pressing him for payment, and are willing to give him time or to accept payment in monthly instalments.
- The debtor had an ulterior motive in applying for surrender: for example, to avoid paying or to defeat the rights of a particular creditor (Ex parte Van den Berg).
- The debtor failed to give a full and frank account of his financial position.
- The debtor's papers were deficient in a number of respects (Ex parte Harmse), in which case the danger looms of costs de bonis propriis.

=== Compulsory sequestration ===
The second way in which a debtor's estate may be sequestrated is by compulsory sequestration. Whereas an application for voluntary surrender is made by the debtor himself, an application for compulsory sequestration is made by one or more creditors.

To have the requisite standing to apply for such a sequestration, a creditor must have a liquidated claim of not less than R100 (or, where the application is by two or more creditors, not less than R200 in aggregate). The court may grant an application for the sequestration of a debtor's estate is it is satisfied, and the applicant creditor has proved,

- that the applicant has established a claim which entitles him, in terms of section 9(1), to apply for sequestration of the debtor's estate;
- that the debtor is in fact insolvent (which would require the applicant to have access to debtor's state of affairs), or has committed an "act of insolvency;" and
- that there is reason to believe that it will be to the advantage of creditors of the debtor if his estate is sequestrated.

The aim of the creditor in such an application is, as a rule, to obtain payment of a debt, or at least part payment. The onus of satisfying the court of these three matters rests on the sequestrating creditor: There is no onus on the debtor to disprove any element.

==== Locus standi ====
Section 9(1) allows proceedings for the compulsory sequestration of a debtor's estate to be instituted by

- a creditor (or his agent) who has a liquidated claim against the debtor for not less than R100; or
- two or more creditors (or their agents) who in aggregate have liquidated claims against the debtor amounting to not less than R200.

The fact that a creditor holds security for his claim does not debar him from applying, even if the value of the security exceeds the amount of the claim.

An agent who applies on behalf of the creditor must be authorised to do so. Lack of authority cannot be cured by ratification once the application has been launched.

A liquidated claim is a monetary claim, the amount of which must be fixed by agreement or judgment.

==== Act of insolvency ====
Although a creditor may have good reason for believing the debtor is insolvent, he will usually not be in a position to prove that the debtor's liabilities exceed his assets. If, however, the creditor can establish that the debtor has committed one or more “act” of insolvency, he may seek an order sequestrating the debtor's estate without having to prove that the debtor is insolvent. Therefore, a debtor's estate may be sequestrated even though he is technically solvent.

An act of insolvency need not be committed vis-à-vis the sequestrating creditor. Section 9(1) gives any creditor of the debtor the right to apply for sequestration once the debtor commits an act of insolvency—whether or not the debtor directed the act at the creditor concerned or intended it to have any bearing on that creditor's affairs.

An act of insolvency committed by a spouse in a marriage in community of property operates as an act of insolvency by both spouses, and is therefore a good basis for sequestration of the joint estate.

An act of insolvency may be proved and relied upon even though it is contained in a communication that would ordinarily be privileged from disclosure, such as an offer marked “without prejudice.”

===== Conduct designated acts of insolvency =====
====== s 8(a): Absence from Republic or dwelling ======
The Act provides that a debtor has committed an act of insolvency “if he leaves the Republic or, being out of the Republic, remains absent from it, or departs from his dwelling or otherwise absents himself, with intent by doing so to evade or delay payment of his debts.”

The creditor must establish the debtor's intention to evade or delay payment of his debts. Proof of departure or absence is not sufficient, because there may be other reasons (employment, for example) why he left.

A factor from which the intention to evade or delay payment may be inferred is that the debtor made an appointment to make a payment and then departed without keeping it. In Abell v Strauss, Abel applied to sequestrate the estate of Strauss, a taxi driver, on the ground that he had committed an act of insolvency in terms of section 8(a), in that he had departed from his dwelling with the intention of evading or delaying the payment of his debts. The court considered that Strauss's frequent absences from his dwelling might be attributed as much to the demands of his occupation as to an intention to avoid payment. In the court's view, it could not be inferred that Strauss had committed the act of insolvency alleged.

In Bishop v Baker, the creditor averred that the debtor had left South Africa with the intention of evading or delaying payment of her debts. She had sailed from Durban to New Zealand, and had sold her property and furniture before doing so. The debtor alleged that she had left because her doctor had advised her to get away to prevent her medical condition from deteriorating further. She had been constantly undergoing medical and surgical treatment since having been bitten by a dog, and was embarrassed by her disfigurement. Furthermore, her daughter lived in New Zealand. The court accepted the debtor's version. It was not satisfied that an “act of sequestration” was proved. The provisional sequestration order was accordingly discharged.

In Estate Salzman v Van Rooyen, the debtor, a company director, left for another town (Cape Town) ostensibly for the purpose of visiting his wife, who had fallen ill there. Prior to his departure, however, he appointed another person as co-director to run the company business, disposed of his office equipment, and terminated the lease of the premises where he had been residing. He gave no address at which he could be contacted in Cape Town and, immediately on arriving there, resigned from his position as director. Thereafter, he ignored letters relating to business matters addressed to him. The court held that the inference was irresistible that he intended to evade payment.

====== s 8(b): Failure to satisfy judgment ======
The Act provides as follows:

If a court has given judgment against him and he fails, upon demand of the officer whose duty it is to execute the judgment, to satisfy it or to indicate to the officer disposable property sufficient to satisfy it, or if it appears from the return made by the officer that he has not found sufficient disposable property to satisfy the judgment.

This subsection creates two separate acts of insolvency:

- where the debtor, upon demand by the sheriff, fails to satisfy the judgment or to indicate disposable property sufficient to satisfy it; and
- where the sheriff, without presenting the writ to the debtor, fails to find sufficient disposable property to satisfy the judgment and states this fact in his return.

The second act applies only if the first cannot be established: that is, only if the writ cannot be served personally on the debtor. If the sheriff, on serving the writ, neglects to demand satisfaction of the writ by the debtor, and thereafter states in his return that he was unable to find sufficient disposable property, no act of insolvency is committed (Nedbank v Norton).

The judgment must be against the debtor in his own name and not, for example, in the name of a firm of which he is the sole proprietor. The judgment does not have to be one obtained by the sequestrating creditor, however; a creditor may sequestrate a debtor on the basis of a nulla bona return on a writ issued at the instance of another creditor, provided the latter has not, in the interim, been paid.

The demand to satisfy the judgment debt must be made of the debtor, or of his duly authorised agent. In other words, a personal service is required; a demand made to some other party, such as the debtor's wife, does not suffice.

“Disposable property” includes any property which may be attached and sold in execution, either movable or immovable.

====== s 8(c): Disposition prejudicing creditors or preferring one creditor ======
The Act provides that a debtor commits an act of insolvency “if he makes, or attempts to make, any disposition of any of his property which has, or would have, the effect of prejudicing his creditors or of preferring one creditor above another.”

This subsection envisages two sets of circumstances:

- an actual disposition of property; and
- an attempted disposition of property

.

If there is an actual disposition, it must have the effect of prejudicing the debtor's creditors or preferring one creditor above another. If there is an attempted disposition, it must be such that it would, if completed, have the same effect.

“Disposition” is wide enough to include both a contract in which the debtor undertakes to dispose of property and the actual subsequent delivery of the property.

Only the effect of the disposition need be considered. It does not matter whether the debtor made the disposition deliberately to favour one of his creditors, or recklessly, without regard for its consequences. The debtor's state of mind in making the disposition is irrelevant.

A debtor commits the act of insolvency where, for example, he refuses to meet one debt while paying another in full, or sells an asset manifestly below its market value while failing to meet debts that have fallen due.

====== s 8(e): Offer of arrangement ======
A debtor commits an act of insolvency, according to the Act, “if he makes, or offers to make, any arrangement with any of his creditors for releasing him wholly or in part from his debts.”

An arrangement or an offer qualifies as an act of insolvency in terms of this subsection only if it is indicative of the debtor's inability to pay his debts.

If the debtor offers, by way of settlement, a lesser amount than that claimed, and denies liability altogether, or disputes the amount of the debt, he does not commit an act of insolvency, because it does not appear from his offer that he cannot pay the debt.

On the other hand, if the debtor offers a lesser sum in settlement and expressly or by implication admits that he owes the full debt, he commits an act of insolvency, because he tacitly acknowledges that he cannot pay the debt (Laeveldse Kooperasie Bpk v Joubert).

The debtor does not have to make the arrangement or offer personally. One made by a third person with his knowledge and permission suffices.

The object of the arrangement or offer must be to release the debtor from liability, wholly or in part. An offer of a certain amount in the rand, subject to the debtor's being allowed an extension of time to pay the balance, does not amount to an act of insolvency.

====== s 8(g): Notice of inability to pay ======
“If he gives notice in writing to any one of his creditors that he is unable to pay any of his debts,” the debtor, according to the Act, commits an act of insolvency.

The notice must be in writing. The debtor does not commit this act of insolvency by informing the creditor orally that he cannot pay his debts, although he does provide the creditor with evidence of actual insolvency.

The words “any of his debts” should be interpreted as meaning that a debtor commits an act of insolvency if he gives notice of inability to pay any single debt.

The court looks to whether a reasonable person in the position of the receiver, having the same knowledge of the relevant circumstances, would have interpreted the document in question to mean that the debtor cannot pay his debts.

Unless the receiver knew, or ought to have known that the document did not truly reflect the debtor's intention, it will not avail the debtor to argue that he made an inappropriate choice of words.

A typical example of this act of insolvency is where a debtor writes to a creditor informing him that he is not in a position to pay the debt for the time being, and offers to pay it in instalments.

====== s 8(h): Inability to pay debts after notice of transfer of business ======
A debtor commits an act of insolvency, in terms of this provision, “if (being a trader) he gives notice in the Gazette in terms of s 34(1) of his intention to transfer his business and is thereafter unable to pay all his debts.”

Section 34(2) provides that, as soon as a notice is published every liquidated liability of the trader in connection with his business which would become due at some future date, falls due forthwith, if the creditor concerned demands payment.

The term “debts” here includes debts which become immediately payable by reason of this subsection.

Proof of inability to pay one debt may be accepted as proof that the debtor is unable to pay all his debts, but evidence that the debtor was unwilling or has refused to pay a particular debt is not enough to establish this act of insolvency.

==== Reason to believe that sequestration will be to the advantage of creditors ====
Before the court may grant a final order of sequestration, it must be satisfied that there is reason to believe that it will be to the advantage of creditors if the debtor's estate is sequestrated.

“Creditors” means all creditors, or at least the general body of creditors. The question is whether or not a “substantial portion” of the creditors, determined according to the value of the claims, will derive advantage from sequestration. Some might not be advantaged—they might even be disadvantaged—but the bulk must not be.

For sequestration to be to the advantage of creditors, it must yield “at the least a not negligible dividend.” The courts have accepted different amounts as “not negligible”—five cents in the Rand considered sufficient in one case, ten cents considered insufficient in another; in Ex Parte Ogunlaja (2011), for the North Gauteng High Court, at least 20 cent in the Rand.

If, after the costs of sequestration have been met, there is no payment to creditors, or only a negligible one, there is no advantage.

To enhance the size of his estate, the debtor may renounce in favour of his creditors the protection afforded by section 82(6) in respect of particular movable assets so that these assets may be sold along with the rest of his property.

The fact that there will be a significant amount for distribution after the costs of sequestration have been satisfied does not necessarily mean that sequestration will be to the advantage of creditors. Sequestration is, in a sense, merely an elaborate means of execution and, because of its costs, an expensive one too.

It is necessary to compare the position of creditors if there is no sequestration with their position if there is a sequestration. Sequestration will only be to the advantage of creditors if it will result in a greater dividend to them than would otherwise be the case—for example, through the setting aside of impeachable transactions, or the exposure of concealed assets—or if it will prevent an unfair division of the proceeds of the assets of some creditors being preferred to others.

The court does not have to be satisfied that sequestration will benefit creditors financially, merely that there is reason to believe that it will: “The facts put before the court must satisfy it that there is a reasonable prospect—not necessarily a likelihood, but a prospect which is not too remote—that some pecuniary benefit will result to the creditors.”

It is not necessary to prove that the debtor has any assets, provided it is shown either that the debtor is in receipt of an income of which substantial portions are likely to become available to creditors in terms of section 23(5), or that there is a reasonable prospect that the trustee, by invoking the machinery of the Act, will unearth or recover assets which will yield a pecuniary benefit for creditors.

The onus of establishing advantage to creditors remains on the sequestrating creditor throughout, even where it is clear that the debtor has committed an act of insolvency.

==== Friendly sequestration ====
There is nothing to prevent a debtor from having his estate sequestrated by an amicable creditor. The debtor may, for instance, arrange with a friend to whom he owes a debt, and whom he is unable to pay, that he (the debtor) will commit an act of insolvency. (He will, for instance, write a letter saying that he cannot meet the debt.) The friend will then apply for compulsory sequestration on the strength of this act of insolvency. An application for compulsory sequestration brought by a creditor who is not at arm's length is generally referred to as “friendly” sequestration.

The mere fact that an application for compulsory sequestration is brought by a creditor who is prepared to co-operate with the debtor, or who is motivated partly by a desire to assist the debtor, does not preclude the granting of a sequestration order. An order should not be refused simply because there is goodwill between the parties.

The court must be mindful, however, that, where debtor and creditor in sequestration proceedings are not at arm's length, there is considerable potential for collusion and malpractice. Collusion consists of an agreement between the parties to suppress facts or manufacture evidence in order to make it appear to the court that one of the parties has a cause of action or a defence. Examples of malpractices that typically arise in friendly sequestrations are

- reliance on a non-existent claim;
- inclusion of protected assets;
- overvaluation of assets;
- underestimation of costs, in order to convince the court that a significant dividend will be payable; and
- repeated extensions of the return date for final sequestration.

A friendly sequestration application may be brought with the sole purpose of obtaining a stay in execution. The debtor resorts to a friendly compulsory sequestration rather than voluntary surrender to achieve the stay because the former procedure is better suited to his purpose. It may be obtained on an urgent basis and without preliminary formalities or advance notice to creditors. It involves a less strenuous onus. The result of the application is, initially, only a provisional order which must be served on the debtor and may be postponed and subsequently discharged at the instance of the sequestrating creditor. A debtor may even use a friendly sequestration as a method of freeing himself entirely from his debts.

The courts have accepted that they must, as a matter of policy, scrutinise every friendly sequestration with particular care to ensure that the requirements of the Act are not subverted, and that the interests of creditors are not prejudiced. In particular, the court should require in each case the following from the sequestrating creditor:

- full details of his claim;
- documentary evidence establishing that he has actually performed as alleged; and
- full details of the debtor's realisable assets.

==== Application for sequestration ====
Prior to the adjudication on the application, the applicant must furnish a copy of the application to the debtor. The court may, in its discretion, dispense with this requirement and make a provisional order of sequestration without advance notice to the debtor if it is satisfied that this would be in the interest of creditors or of the debtor.

One suggestion is that the court would be justified in dispensing with prior notice only in cases of urgency, where there is a reasonable likelihood of irreparable loss to the application if the debtor is forewarned of the impending application.

It is no longer permissible for a court to grant a provisional order ex parte merely because the applicant has clear documentary evidence, such as a nulla bona return.

==== Court’s discretion ====
Even if the court is satisfied that the requirements have been established on a balance of probabilities, it is not bound to grant a final order of sequestration:

- The debtor might produce independent evidence that he is, in fact, solvent.
- The debtor might have counter claim against creditor.
- The creditor might have had ulterior motives. (It is not only the sneakiness of debtors that matters, therefore. The court must uphold justice and fairness on both sides.)

In each case, the court has an overriding discretion, to be exercised upon a consideration of all the circumstances. The court may, therefore, exercise its discretion against sequestration, notwithstanding proof of an act of insolvency and the other requirements.

== Effects of sequestration order ==
The chief effects of a sequestration order are

- to divest the insolvent of all his assets; and
- to deprive the insolvent of full contractual capacity.

Other consequences include criminal liability on the part of the insolvent for certain acts committed both before and during sequestration. The insolvent may also obtain relief from the effects of certain legal proceedings.

=== Deprivation of property ===
The insolvent is divested of all his estate: that is, all the property he owned at the date of sequestration and that he may acquire during the sequestration—except such property as the insolvent is entitled to retain as a separate estate. "Property" in this context is defined to include "movable or immovable property wherever situate in South Africa." It includes a right of action, unless the action is one that the insolvent is permitted to institute. It also includes property that is, or the proceeds of property that are, in the hands of a sheriff under a writ of attachment. The insolvent's property includes contingent interests in property, other than the contingent interests of a fideicommissary heir or legatee.

This estate vests in one or two trustees who are elected by the creditors, and whose appointment is confirmed by the Master of the High Court. The trustee acquires the dominium of the entire estate, but such ownership is merely a nuda proprietas. The trustee does not obtain any beneficial interest in the property. The trustee is, in a sense, the agent of the persons in fact beneficially interested in the estate: namely,

- the creditors; and,
- in the event that there is a surplus after satisfaction of the creditors' claims, the insolvent, who has a residuary interest in the estate.

It is the trustee's duty to collect and liquidate the estate assets, and to distribute the proceeds among the estate creditors, giving preference to the secured creditors and certain preferred creditors, and dividing the balance, if any, termed the "free residue," proportionately among the unsecured or concurrent creditors. If any surplus remains after the costs of sequestration have been paid, and after all creditors have been satisfied, it is returned to the insolvent.

Where the joint estate of spouses married in community of property is sequestrated, both spouses are divested of the joint estate and each of any separate assets falling outside the joint estate.

If the insolvent is married out of community of property and the spouses are not living apart under a judicial order of separation, then on sequestration the solvent spouse's property also vests in the insolvent's trustee as if it were the insolvent's property. The solvent spouse may reclaim such property as he proves to be his own property. Until such property is released by the trustee pursuant to such claim, the solvent spouse does not have the usual powers of ownership. A court may, either at the time of granting the sequestration order or at a later stage, exclude the solvent spouse's property from the operation of the sequestration on certain grounds.

==== Property falling within the estate ====
What falls within the estate? Subject to certain exceptions flowing from the Act, the insolvent estate comprises the following:

- all property of the insolvent at the date of sequestration, including property (or the proceeds thereof) in the hands of a sheriff under a writ of attachment; and
- all property which the insolvent acquires or which accrues to him during the sequestration, including any property that the insolvent recovers for the benefit of the estate where the trustee fails to take the necessary action.

In terms of section 2, “property” means movable or immovable property wherever situate in the Republic, and includes contingent interests in property. Assets situated outside the Republic are not included—even though, if the debtor is domiciled within the jurisdiction of the court, the sequestration order divests him of all his movable property, wherever situated.

Whenever an insolvent has acquired possession of property which is claimed by the trustee, it is deemed to belong to the insolvent estate, unless the contrary is proved. If, however, a person who became a creditor of the insolvent after sequestration alleges that a particular asset does not belong to the estate, and claims a right to the asset, it is deemed not to belong to the estate unless the contrary is proved.

Sequestration of a joint estate makes both spouses “insolvent debtors” for the purposes of the Act, with the consequence that the property of both of them (comprising their shares in the joint estate, as well as separately-owned property) vests in the trustee and is available to meet the claims of creditors. Thus, property inherited by a spouse to a marriage in community of property forms part of the insolvent estate, even if the will contains a provision specifically excluding the property from any community of property.

Property inherited by an insolvent during his insolvency falls into his insolvent estate, notwithstanding a contrary provision in the testator's will. However, if an insolvent refuses to accept property bequeathed to him or an insurance benefit of which he has been nominated as a beneficiary, the property or benefit in question does not vest in his estate. The reason is that the insolvent merely has a competence or power to accept the bequest or nomination, and he acquires no right to the property or benefit until he has accepted. An insolvent may, thus, by repudiating a legacy, inheritance or insurance benefit, ensure that it passes to someone other than the trustee and the creditors of his insolvent estate.

The property of the spouse of the insolvent, where the marriage is out of community of property, also vests in the trustee of the insolvent estate, until it is released by the trustee.

Also forming part of insolvent estate are liquor licenses and rights of action (not personal).

=== Status ===
Sequestration of a debtor's estate imposes on him a form of reduction in status, which curtails his capacity to contract, to earn a living, to litigate and to hold office. The Act does not deprive the debtor of his contractual capacity generally; he retains a general competency to make binding agreements. The insolvent may validly enter into any contract,

- provided that he does not purport to dispose of any of the assets in the insolvent estate; and
- provided that he may not, without the written consent of the trustee, conclude any contract that is likely to affect adversely the insolvent estate.

To protect creditors, the Act imposes certain restrictions on the debtor's capacity to contract. Sequestration, then, does affect contractual capacity where it will affect the insolvent estate by

- disposing of any property in the insolvent estate;
- diminishing the value of his estate in any way; or
- affecting the contribution that the trustee may require the insolvent to make.

==== Prohibited contracts ====
The debtor may not make a contract which purports to dispose of any property of his insolvent estate. Furthermore, he may not, without the written consent of the trustee, enter into a contract which adversely affects his estate or any contribution which he is obliged to make towards his estate. That contribution is what is claimable by the trustee in terms of section 23(5) from moneys earned by the insolvent in the course of his profession, occupation or employment. The contribution becomes due to the trustee only once the Master has expressed the opinion that the moneys in question are not necessary for the support of the insolvent and his dependents. It follows that, prior to the Master's assessment of a contribution, the insolvent need not obtain the trustee's consent to enter into the contract.

If a person avers that a particular contract with an insolvent is invalid for any reason, he must set out the facts on which he bases his allegation.

Where the trustee's consent is not necessary (or where it is, and is given), the contract is valid and binding on the parties. Although the contract is binding, the insolvent may not enforce performance in his favour unless the Act specifically gives him the right to do so. In the absence of an empowering statutory provision, the trustee is the proper person to enforce the claim.

Thus, for example, the insolvent cannot compel payment of money due in terms of a post-sequestration partnership entered into with the trustee's consent, since there is no statutory provision which entitles him to recover for his own benefit money due under a partnership. Only the trustee can demand this payment.

On the other hand, the insolvent may enforce payment for work done after sequestration because section 23(9) expressly gives him the right to recover this remuneration for his own benefit.

A contract made by the insolvent without the trustee's consent, where such consent is necessary, is not void, but it is voidable at the instance of the trustee. This is subject to the qualification that, if an insolvent purports to alienate, for valuable consideration, and without the consent of the trustee of the insolvent estate, any property acquired after sequestration, or right to such property to a person who proves that he was not aware and had no reason to suspect that the estate of the insolvent was under sequestration, the alienation shall nevertheless be valid.

The insolvent may follow any profession or occupation, and enter into any employment—except that he may not, without the written consent of the trustee, carry on, or be employed in, the business of a trader who is a general dealer or manufacturer. The insolvent may not, save under authority of a court, be a director of a company.

If the insolvent enters a contract which purports to dispose of estate property, the contract is voidable at the option of the trustee; it is not void. The position is the same if the insolvent contracts without obtaining his trustee's consent where it is required.

Should the trustee choose not to set aside the contract, or simply to stand by without avoiding it, the contract remains valid and binding on all parties. However, as in the case of a contract which does not require consent, or to which consent has been given, the insolvent cannot sue for performance unless there is a statutory provision giving him the right to enforce for his own benefit performance under that type of contract.

If the trustee elects to set aside a contract, he may recover any performance rendered by the insolvent, but he must restore to the third party any benefits that the insolvent has received under the transaction.

The insolvent may sue or be sued in his own name in any matter relating to status or to any right not affecting his estate, and may claim damages for defamation or personal injury.

==== Earning a livelihood ====
Nobody wants the insolvent to be destitute. The insolvent, therefore, is allowed to follow any profession or occupation, and to enter into any contracts related thereto. The insolvent, however, requires the consent of the trustee in order to carry on the business of a trader or manufacturer. If the trustee refuses this permission, the insolvent may appeal to the Master. Why? Because of the disposition of assets: If your business is buying and selling, the trustee's work is made very difficult.

==== Legal proceedings ====
The following types of proceedings may be brought personally by the insolvent:

- matters relating to status;
- matters which do not affect the insolvent estate;
- claims to recover remuneration for work done;
- a claim for a pension;
- delictual claims for defamation and for personal injury; and
- delicts committed by the insolvent after sequestration.

As for costs, there is a distinction to be made between costs in the Magistrate's Court and costs in the High Court:

- Magistrate's Court proceedings require security for costs.
- High Court proceedings do not, unless the matter appears to be vexatious or reckless. The court has a discretion.

If the insolvent is awarded costs, they are his to dispose of as he so chooses.

==== Holding office ====
An unrehabilitated insolvent is disqualified from being

- a trustee in an insolvent estate;
- a member of parliament, the National Council of Provinces, or a provincial legislature;
- a director of company or managing member of a closed corporation (without the permission of the court);
- a member of the governing board of the National Credit Regulator (for obvious reasons);
- the

business rescue practitioner (for much the same reason);

- a board member of the Land Bank;
- an attorney or estate agent with a fidelity-fund certificate—unless he can show that he is still fit and proper;
- a registered manufacturer or distributor of liquor; and,
- possibly, an executor of a deceased estate, or, again possibly, the trustee of a trust. (What the “possibilities” here refer to is the discretion of the Master.)

=== Acquisition of separate estate ===
During sequestration, the insolvent may acquire certain assets that do not vest in the insolvent estate, such as

- remuneration for work done or professional services rendered;
- a pension;
- damages for defamation or personal injury;
- certain insurance benefits; and
- a share in an accrual.

In that way the insolvent may acquire an estate separate from the sequestrated estate. That separate estate may in turn be sequestrated.

==== Vesting of estate in trustee ====
The function of the trustee is

- to collect the assets in the estate;
- to realise (or better say to sell) them; and
- to distribute the proceeds among the creditors in the order of preference laid down by the Act.

To enable the trustee to do this, the Act provides that the effect of a sequestration order is to divest the insolvent of his estate and vest it in the Master, and thereafter the trustee, once he has been appointed. If a provisional trustee is appointed, the estate vests in him before vesting in the trustee.

The estate remains vested in the trustee until

- the discharge of the sequestration order by the court;
- the acceptance by creditors of an offer of composition made by the insolvent which provides that the insolvent's property will be restored to him; or
- an order for the insolvent's rehabilitation is granted in terms of section 124(3).

If a trustee vacates his office, is removed from office or dies, the estate re-vests in the Master until a new trustee is appointed. If there is a co-trustee, the estate remains vested in him.

=== Criminal liability ===
An insolvent is liable to imprisonment for a number of acts committed before sequestration, which, if committed by a solvent person, would not constitute crimes: for example, failing to keep proper books, or diminishing his assets by gambling, betting or hazardous speculations. Further, an insolvent is criminally liable for certain specified acts committed during sequestration, such as obtaining credit to an amount exceeding R20 without informing the creditor that he is insolvent.

=== Relief to insolvent ===
If the insolvent is in prison for debt when declared insolvent, he may apply to court for release. The court has a discretion in this regard.

In terms of the Abolition of Civil Imprisonment Act, 1977, no court shall have the power to order the civil imprisonment of a debtor for failure to pay a sum of money in terms of any judgment. This Act does not, however, affect the power of a court to grant an order for the committal of any person for contempt of court or to sentence a judgment debtor to imprisonment in terms of any provision of the Magistrates' Courts Act, 1944 for failing to satisfy the judgment.

On sequestration, civil proceedings by or against an insolvent relating to property that falls into the insolvent estate are stayed until the appointment of a trustee. A further consequence of a sequestration order is that the execution on any judgment against the insolvent is stayed unless the court otherwise directs.

== Rehabilitation ==
An insolvent's status as such is terminated by rehabilitation. A court may grant a rehabilitation order on application by the insolvent within a comparatively short time of the sequestration, where the claims have been paid in full or where an offer of composition has been accepted by the creditors and payment has been made of at least 50 cents in the rand on all claims. Otherwise, periods varying from twelve months to five years must have elapsed. These periods vary according to whether or not claims have been proved, whether or not the insolvent's estate has been sequestrated previously, and whether or not the insolvent has been convicted of any fraudulent act of insolvency.

A rehabilitation order has the effect of putting an end to the sequestration of the debtor's estate, of discharging all the insolvent's debts due before sequestration, and of relieving the insolvent of every disability resulting from the sequestration. Rehabilitation does not, however, affect

- the rights of the trustee or of creditors under a composition;
- the powers or duties of the Master or the duties of the trustee in connection with a composition;
- the right of the trustee or creditors to any part of the insolvent's estate which is vested in but has not yet been distributed by the trustee;
- the liability of a surety for the insolvent; or
- the liability of any person to pay any penalty or suffer any punishment imposed under the Act.

Where an insolvent has not been rehabilitated by order of court within ten years from the date of sequestration, the insolvent is deemed to be rehabilitated automatically after that period unless a court orders otherwise before the expiry of the period of ten years.

== Administration orders ==
Administration orders are granted in terms of the Magistrates’ Court Act. They have been described as a modified form of sequestration. This procedure is applicable to debtors with small incomes and few assets, where the costs of sequestration would exhaust the assets in the estate, so that the aim of the order is to assist debtors over a period of financial embarrassment without the need for sequestration of the debtor's estate.

Where a debtor whose debts do not exceed an amount determined by the Minister from time to time, by notice in the Gazette, cannot pay a judgment debt immediately, or is unable to satisfy his debts and has insufficient assets capable of attachment in execution, a magistrate may, on application of the debtor or under section 651 of the Magistrates' Courts Act, make an order, subject to such conditions as the court deems fit, providing for the administration of the debtor's estate and for the payment of his debts in instalments or otherwise.

The administrator appointed must, among other duties, collect payments due to the debtor and distribute those, at least once a quarter, pro rata among the debtor's creditors, subject to any preference claims being paid in the legal order of preference.
