= Yvonne Mokgoro =

South African jurist (1950–2024)

Yvonne Mokgoro GOB
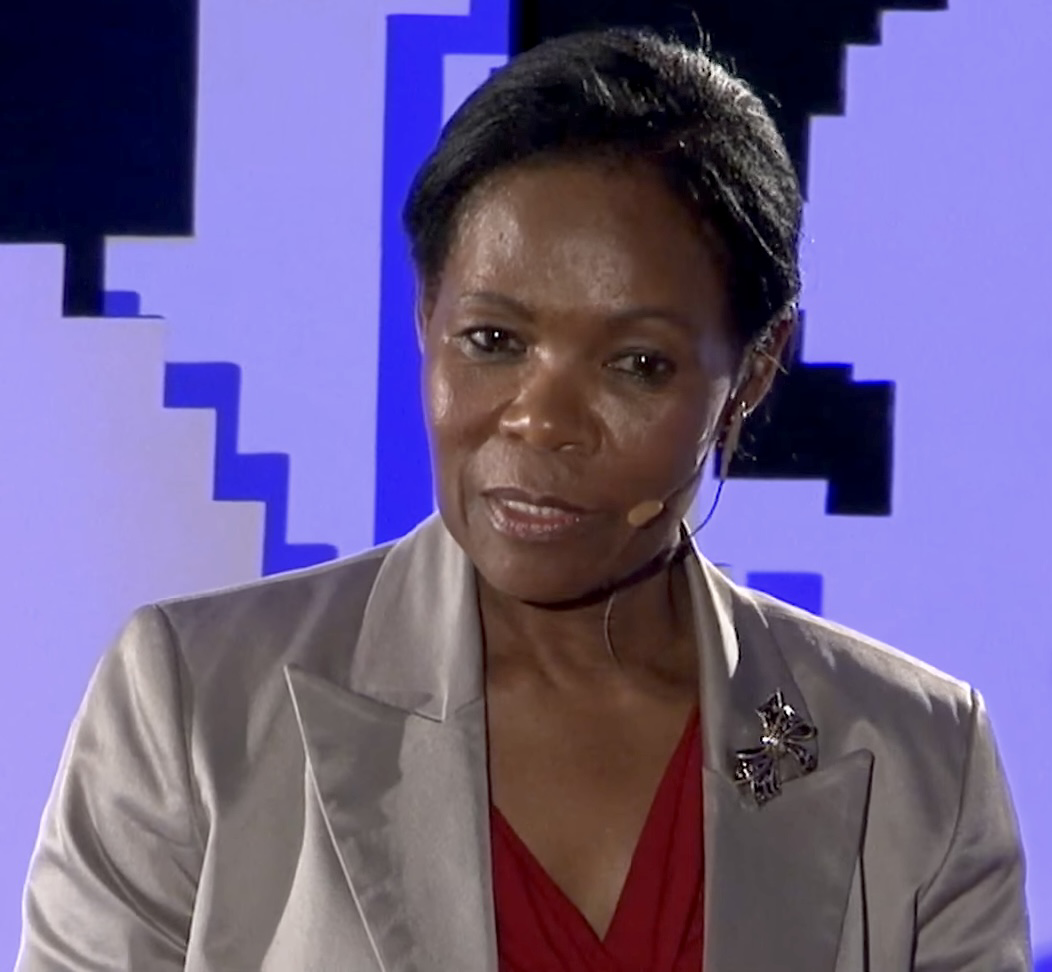
- Mokgoro in 2012

Justice of the Constitutional Court
- In office 13 October 1994 – 11 October 2009
- Appointed by: Nelson Mandela

Personal details
- Born: 19 October 1950 Galeshewe, South Africa
- Died: 9 May 2024 (aged 73)
- Spouse: Job Mokgoro
- Education: St. Boniface High School
- Alma mater: University of Bophuthatswana (LLB, LLM); University of Pennsylvania (LLM)

Jennifer Yvonne Mokgoro GOB (19 October 1950 – 9 May 2024) was a South African jurist who served on the Constitutional Court of South Africa from October 1994 to October 2009. She also chaired the South African Law Reform Commission between 1995 and 2011. She qualified as a lawyer in the former Bophuthatswana and was a legal academic before she was appointed to the bench by President Nelson Mandela.

== Early life and education ==
Mokgoro was born on 19 October 1950 in Galeshewe, a township in Kimberley in the former Cape Province. Her parents had only a primary education, and she was the first of her siblings to complete high school, matriculating in 1970 at the local St. Boniface High School.

Her first jobs were as a nursing assistant, a retail salesperson, and then as a clerk in the Bophuthatswana Department of Justice. In her early 20s, she was arrested for obstruction of justice after she intervened to object when the police arrested a young man for loitering. Although the charge against her was dropped after a brief detention, she was represented by political activist Robert Sobukwe, a family friend who was banished to Kimberley and was one of the few black lawyers in the town; according to Mokgoro, Sobukwe encouraged her to become a lawyer, and she enrolled part-time in legal study shortly afterwards.

Balancing her legal study with her full-time work and young children, Mokgoro attended the University of Bophuthatswana (now the North-West University), where she completed a BJuris in 1982 and an LLB in 1984. On campus, she was active in the South African Students Organisation and African National Congress, both anti-apartheid organisations.

== Legal career and scholarship ==
While studying for her LLB, Mokgoro worked at the Mmabatho Magistrate's Court as a maintenance officer and public prosecutor. After receiving her LLB, however, she was appointed a lecturer in the University of Bophuthatswana's Department of Jurisprudence, where she worked until 1991, rising through the ranks to become an associate professor. At the same time, she completed two LLMs, one at the University of Bophuthatswana in 1987 and another at the University of Pennsylvania Law School in 1990.

From 1992 to 1993, she was an associate professor in law at the University of the Western Cape. After that, she worked briefly as a specialist human rights researcher for the Human Sciences Research Council's Centre for Constitutional Analysis, while also lecturing part-time at the University of Pretoria. Her research and teaching focused on sociological jurisprudence, human rights, customary law, and the effect of law on women and children.

== Constitutional Court: 1994–2009 ==
In October 1994, shortly after the end of apartheid, President Nelson Mandela appointed Mokgoro to the newly established Constitutional Court of South Africa. She was the first black woman to join the bench and, along with Kate O'Regan, was one of two women overall. She served a full 15-year term before retiring in October 2009. Notable judgements penned by Mokgoro during that time included the court's majority judgements in Larbi-Odam v MEC for Education, Jaftha v Schoeman, Khosa v Minister of Social Development, and Geldenhuys v National Director of Public Prosecutions.

Throughout much of her service on the bench, Mokgoro was also the chairperson of the South African Law Reform Commission, serving three consecutive terms in the chair between 1995 and 2011.

== Other activities and retirement ==
While serving on the bench, Mokgoro was the president of Africa Legal Aid, an Accra-based organisation, between 1995 and 2011; she was also the chairperson of the council of the University of Venda between 2002 and 2009, and a member of the International Association of Women Judges and the International Federation of Women Lawyers. After her retirement from the bench in 2009, she held trusteeships at organisations including the Open Society Justice Initiative, the University of Pretoria's Centre for Human Rights, the Nelson Mandela Children's Fund, and the Mandela Rhodes Trust. From 2013 to 2018, she was an official advocate for social cohesion in South Africa, appointed to that position by President Jacob Zuma.

In December 2021, Mokgoro was appointed chairperson of the United Nations Human Rights Council's Racial Justice Body, a new mechanism established to examine systemic racism in law enforcement and criminal justice. With Juan E. Méndez of Argentina and Tracie L. Keesee of the United States, she served a three-year term on the panel.

== Personal life and death ==
At a young age, she married Job Mokgoro, who became an academic and politician and with whom she had five children.

On 3 April 2023, Mokgoro was seriously injured in a car crash in the Northern Cape. When she was discharged from hospital in June, her family announced that she would "step back" from her public engagements in order to focus on her recovery. Mokgoro died on 9 May 2024, at the age of 73.
