= List of judgments of the Constitutional Court of South Africa delivered in 2006 =

The table below lists the judgments of the Constitutional Court of South Africa delivered in 2006.

The members of the court at the start of 2006 were Chief Justice Pius Langa, Deputy Chief Justice Dikgang Moseneke, and judges Tholie Madala, Yvonne Mokgoro, Sandile Ngcobo, Kate O'Regan, Albie Sachs, Thembile Skweyiya, Johann van der Westhuizen and Zak Yacoob. The seat left vacant by the retirement of Arthur Chaskalson in 2005 was filled by the appointment of Bess Nkabinde in January.

Citation	Case name	Heard	Decided	Majority author
[2006] ZACC 1	African Christian Democratic Party v Electoral Commission and Others	23 February 2006	24 February 2006	O'Regan
[2006] ZACC 2	Matatiele Municipality and Others v President of the Republic of South Africa and Others	14 February 2006	27 February 2006	Ngcobo
[2006] ZACC 3	Ex Parte Minister of Social Development and Others	6 March 2006	9 March 2006	Van der Westhuizen
[2006] ZACC 4	Van der Merwe v Road Accident Fund and Another	24 November 2005	30 March 2006	Moseneke
[2006] ZACC 5	Campus Law Clinic (University of KwaZulu-Natal, Durban) v Standard Bank of South Africa Ltd and Another		31 March 2006	The Court
[2006] ZACC 6	Phumelela Gaming and Leisure Limited v Gründlingh and Others	15 November 2005	18 May 2006	Langa
[2006] ZACC 25	Du Toit v Seria		23 May 2006	The Court
[2006] ZACC 7	South African Liquor Traders Association and Others v Chairperson, Gauteng Liquor Board and Others	2 March and 3 May 2006	2 June 2006	O'Regan
[2006] ZACC 8	Magajane v Chairperson, North West Gambling Board and Others	23 February 2006	8 June 2006	Van der Westhuizen
[2006] ZACC 9	AAA Investments (Pty) Ltd v Micro Finance Regulatory Council and Another	28 February 2006	28 July 2006	Yacoob
[2006] ZACC 10	Dikoko v Mokhatla	23 March 2006	3 August 2006	Mokgoro (merits), Moseneke (damages)
[2006] ZACC 11	Doctors for Life International v Speaker of the National Assembly and Others	23 August 2005 and 21 February 2006	17 August 2006	Ngcobo
[2006] ZACC 12	Matatiele Municipality and Others v President of the Republic of South Africa and Others	30 March 2006	18 August 2006	Ngcobo
[2006] ZACC 13	Giddey NO v JC Barnard and Partners	16 May 2006	1 September 2006	O'Regan
[2006] ZACC 14	Concerned Land Claimants Organisation of Port Elizabeth v Port Elizabeth Land and Community Restoration Association and Others		21 September 2006	The Court
[2006] ZACC 15	South African Broadcasting Corporation Limited v National Director of Public Prosecutions and Others	13 September 2006	21 September 2006	Langa, Kondile (acting), Madala, Nkabinde, O'Regan, Van Heerden (acting) and Yacoob
[2006] ZACC 16	Steenkamp NO v Provincial Tender Board, Eastern Cape	11 May 2006	28 September 2006	Moseneke
[2006] ZACC 17	Prophet v National Director of Public Prosecutions	7 March and 10 May 2006	29 September 2006	Nkabinde
[2006] ZACC 18	South African Police Service v Public Servants Association	18 May 2006	13 October 2006	Sachs
[2006] ZACC 19	Lekolwane and Another v Minister of Justice and Constitutional Development	22 August 2006	23 November 2006	The Court
[2006] ZACC 20	Gory v Kolver NO and Others	24 August 2006	23 November 2006	Van Heerden (acting)
[2006] ZACC 21	Minister of Safety and Security v Luiters	17 August 2006	30 November 2006	Langa
[2006] ZACC 22	Sibiya and Others v Director of Public Prosecutions (Johannesburg High Court) and Others		30 November 2006	Yacoob
[2006] ZACC 23	Union of Refugee Women and Others v Director, Private Security Industry Regulatory Authority and Others	29 August 2006	12 December 2006	Kondile (acting)
[2006] ZACC 24	Fraser v ABSA Bank Limited	23 May 2006	15 December 2006	Van der Westhuizen
