= List of Constitutional Court opinions of Albie Sachs =

Albie Sachs served in the Constitutional Court of South Africa from its inception in 1995 until his retirement in 2009.

== Majority opinions ==
No.	Case name	Citation	Notes
1	Prinsloo v Van der Linde	[1997] ZACC 5	Co-written with Ackermann and O'Regan.
2	Mistry v Interim National Medical and Dental Council	[1998] ZACC 10	Dual opinions with Chaskalson; unanimous.
3	August v Electoral Commission	[1999] ZACC 3	Unanimous.
4	S v Baloyi	[1999] ZACC 19	Unanimous.
5	S v Manamela	[2000] ZACC 5	Co-written with Madala and Yacoob.
6	Christian Education South Africa v Minister of Education	[2000] ZACC 11	Unanimous.
7	Saane v Hulme	[2000] ZACC 13	Unanimous.
8	Moseneke v Master of the High Court	[2000] ZACC 27	Unanimous.
9	Booysen v Minister of Home Affairs	[2001] ZACC 20	Unanimous.
10	Minister of Education v Harris	[2001] ZACC 25	Unanimous.
11	Daniels v Campbell	[2004] ZACC 14	
12	Port Elizabeth Municipality v Various Occupiers	[2004] ZACC 7	Unanimous.
13	Minister of Home Affairs v Fourie	[2005] ZACC 19	
14	South African Police Service v Public Servants Association	[2006] ZACC 18	
15	Minister of Safety and Security v Van Niekerk	[2007] ZACC 15	Unanimous.
16	S v M	[2007] ZACC 18	
17	AD v DW	[2007] ZACC 27	Unanimous.
18	President v Quagliani (No. 1)	[2009] ZACC 1	Unanimous.
19	President v Quagliani (No. 2)	[2009] ZACC 9	Unanimous.
20	Biowatch Trust v Registrar, Genetic Resources	[2009] ZACC 14	Unanimous.
21	Bothma v Els	[2009] ZACC 27	Unanimous.
