= List of Constitutional Court opinions of Johann van der Westhuizen =

Johann van der Westhuizen served in the Constitutional Court of South Africa from 1 February 2004 until his retirement on 31 January 2016.

== Majority opinions ==
No.	Case name	Citation
1	Mashavha v President	[2004] ZACC 6
2	S v Jaipal	[2005] ZACC 1
3	Omar v Government	[2005] ZACC 17
4	Ex Parte Minister of Social Development	[2006] ZACC 3
5	Magajane v Chairperson, North West Gambling Board	[2006] ZACC 8
6	Fraser v ABSA	[2006] ZACC 24
7	Shilubana v Nwamitwa (No. 1)	[2007] ZACC 14
8	Shilubana v Nwamitwa (No. 2)	[2008] ZACC 9
9	Merafong Demarcation Forum v President	[2008] ZACC 10
10	Weare v Ndebele	[2008] ZACC 20
11	Gcaba v Minister for Safety and Security	[2009] ZACC 26
12	Nokotyana v Ekurhuleni Metropolitan Municipality	[2009] ZACC 33
13	Road Accident Fund v Mdeyide	[2010] ZACC 18
14	Falk and Another v National Director of Public Prosecutions	[2011] ZACC 26
15	City of Johannesburg Metropolitan Municipality v Blue Moonlight Properties	[2011] ZACC 33
16	Van der Burg v National Director of Public Prosecutions	[2012] ZACC 12
17	National Credit Regulator v Opperman	[2012] ZACC 29
18	Ngewu v Post Office Retirement Fund	[2013] ZACC 4
19	Tulip Diamonds FZE v Minister for Justice and Constitutional Development	[2013] ZACC 19
20	Minister of Justice and Constitutional Development v Masingili	[2013] ZACC 41
21	Loureiro v iMvula Quality Protection	[2014] ZACC 4
22	De Klerk v Griekwaland Wes Korporatief	[2014] ZACC 20
23	Khohliso v S	[2014] ZACC 33
24	Tronox KZN Sands v KwaZulu-Natal Planning and Development Appeal Tribunal	[2016] ZACC 2
