= S v M =

South African legal case

- Court: Constitutional Court of South Africa
- Full case name: M v the State
- Decided: 26 September 2007
- Docket nos.: CCT 53/06
- Citations: [2007] ZACC 18; 2008 (3) SA 232 (CC); 2007 (12) BCLR 1312 (CC); 2007 (2) SACR 539 (CC)

Court membership
- Judges sitting: Moseneke DCJ, Madala J, Mokgoro J, Ngcobo J, O'Regan J, Nkabinde J, Sachs J, Skweyiya J, van der Westhuizen J and Navsa AJ

Case opinions
- When a court passes a criminal sentence on the primary caregiver of a child, section 28(2) of the Constitution, read with section 28(1)(b), obligates the court to consider the impact of the sentence on the child.
- Decision by: Sachs J (Moseneke, Mokgoro, Ngcobo, O'Regan, Skweyiya and van der Westhuizen concurring)
- Concur/dissent: Madala J (Nkabinde and Navsa concurring)

Keywords
- Best interests of the child; children's rights; criminal sentencing; right to family care; section 28 of the Constitution

S v M is a 2007 decision of the Constitutional Court of South Africa with import for children's rights and criminal sentencing. The court held unanimously that the best interests of the child must be considered whenever a child's primary caregiver is handed a criminal sentence. This obligation arises from section 28(2) of the Constitution, which enshrines the paramountcy of the best interests of the child, read with section 28(1)(b) of the Constitution, which enshrines every children's right to family care or appropriate alternative care.

The court's majority judgment was written by Justice Albie Sachs, and the full bench agreed with his exposition of section 28. The majority used this framework to overturn a prison sentence handed to a single mother, instead sentencing her to a period of non-custodial correctional supervision. However, a three-member minority, represented in a minority opinion by Justice Tholie Madala, differed from the majority in its evaluation of the facts of the case and would not have reduced the mother's sentence in this instance.

== Background ==
In 2002, M was sentenced of 38 counts of fraud and four counts of theft in the Wynberg Regional Court in Wynberg, Cape Town. Although she was deemed to be an appropriate candidate for correctional supervision, she was sentenced to four years' direct imprisonment. During an ensuing appeal, the Cape High Court found that she had been wrongfully convicted on a count of fraud and converted her sentence to one year of imprisonment under section 276(1)(i) of the Criminal Procedure Act of 1977. Both the High Court and the Supreme Court of Appeal denied her leave to appeal this sentence, but the Constitutional Court of South Africa agreed to enrol the application for leave to appeal.

In its directions, the courts asked the parties to focus on one narrow element of M's case, the fact that she was the sole caregiver to three minor children. In particular, the legal question to be decided was stated crisply:

What are the duties of the sentencing court in the light of section 28(2) of the Constitution and any relevant statutory provisions when the person being sentenced is the primary caregiver of minor children?

Section 28(2), one of the provisions of the Bill of Rights relating to children's rights, provides that, "A child's best interests are of paramount importance in every matter concerning the child."

The Constitutional Court heard argument on 22 February 2007 and delivered judgment on 26 September 2007. The Centre for Child Law, represented by Ann Skelton, was admitted as amicus curiae.

== Majority judgment ==
No constitutional injunction can in and of itself isolate children from the shocks and perils of harsh family and neighbourhood environments. What the law can do is create conditions to protect children from abuse and maximise opportunities for them to lead productive and happy lives. Thus, even if the State cannot itself repair disrupted family life, it can create positive conditions for repair to take place, and diligently seek wherever possible to avoid conduct of its agencies which may have the effect of placing children in peril. It follows that section 28 requires the law to make best efforts to avoid, where possible, any breakdown of family life or parental care that may threaten to put children at increased risk. Similarly, in situations where rupture of the family becomes inevitable, the State is obliged to minimise the consequent negative effect on children as far as it can.

— Albie Sachs's majority judgment, para. 20

Justice Albie Sachs, writing on behalf of the court's majority, found in M's favour; his judgment was joined by Deputy Chief Justice Dikgang Moseneke and Justices Yvonne Mokgoro, Sandile Ngcobo, Kate O'Regan, Thembile Skweyiya, and Johann van der Westhuizen.

Sachs's judgment opened with a lengthy exposition of the section 28 constitutional children's rights and particularly the principle of the paramountcy of the best interests of the child. Sachs acknowledged that the paramountcy principle had been criticised for providing an indeterminate standard, but he argued that "it is precisely the contextual nature and inherent flexibility of section 28 that constitutes the source of its strength". Nonetheless, it was necessary to "establish an appropriate operational thrust for the paramountcy principle", in terms of which the paramountcy principle can be balanced against other constitutional rights, though such a "thrust" would be applied flexibly and on a case-by-case basis.

In the case of criminal sentences handed to primary caregivers, Sachs found that section 28(2), the paramountcy principle, has to be read alongside section 28(1), which guarantees every child's right "to family care or parental care, or to appropriate alternative care when removed from the family environment". This right is implicated whenever a child's primary caregiver is imprisoned, and the Constitution binds the sentencing court to balance the child's right against the other societal interests served by criminal sentencing – notably, the state's duty to punish criminal misconduct. Per Sachs, the paramountcy principle does not imply that the child's interests override all other interests, but that the child's interests must be considered alongside the others:

...it is not the sentencing of the primary caregiver in and of itself that threatens to violate the interests of the children. It is the imposition of the sentence without paying appropriate attention to the need to have special regard for the children's interests that threatens to do so. The purpose of emphasising the duty of the sentencing court to acknowledge the interests of the children, then, is not to permit errant parents unreasonably to avoid appropriate punishment. Rather, it is to protect the innocent children as much as is reasonably possible in the circumstances from avoidable harm.

In this framework, sentencing courts should continue to be guided by S v Zinn, which remained the authoritative statement on factors to be considered in sentencing: the so-called "Zinn triad" draws attention to the nature of the crime, the circumstances of the offender, and the interests of the community. Although Sachs was opposed to outlining a "formula", he suggested "guidelines" for incorporating section 28 considerations into the application of the Zinn triad:

- A sentencing court should find out whether a convicted person is a primary caregiver whenever there are indications that this might be so... The court should also ascertain the effect on the children of a custodial sentence if such a sentence is being considered.
- If on the Zinn triad approach the appropriate sentence is clearly custodial and the convicted person is a primary caregiver, the court must apply its mind to whether it is necessary to take steps to ensure that the children will be adequately cared for while the caregiver is incarcerated.
- If the appropriate sentence is clearly non-custodial, the court must determine the appropriate sentence, bearing in mind the interests of the children.
- Finally, if there is a range of appropriate sentences on the Zinn approach, then the court must use the paramountcy principle concerning the interests of the child as an important guide in deciding which sentence to impose.

In the current case, the majority held that the Regional Magistrate who sentenced M had not given "sufficient independent and informed attention" to the impact that the sentence would have on M's children. The court therefore upheld M's appeal against her sentence and set it aside. Instead, the court sentenced her to four years' imprisonment, as the Regional Court had, but, unlike the Regional Court, it suspended the sentence for four years. After considering at some length the merits of correctional supervision as an alternative to direct imprisonment, the court additionally placed M under correctional supervision for three years, to include community service and regular counselling; she was also ordered to repay the individuals that she had defrauded.

== Minority judgment ==
Justice Tholie Madala wrote a separate minority judgment in which Justice Bess Nkabinde and Acting Justice Mahomed Navsa concurred. Madala professed himself to be in agreement with Sachs's "philosophical analysis" of the duties of a sentencing court to balancing the child's interests against other societal interests. He also agreed that the sentencing court in M's case had not had sufficient regard to the interests of M's children to satisfy this constitutional requirement. However, when Madala himself applied this approach in M's case, within the framework set out by Sachs, the evidence nonetheless led him to conclude that the four-year sentence was appropriate and should be upheld.

Specifically, Madala argued that the determination of a primary caregiver's sentence should include consideration of:

the ages and special needs of the minor children, the nature and character of the primary caregiver, the seriousness and prevalence of the offence committed and the degree of moral blameworthiness on the part of the accused. In a case where the primary caregiver is a first offender, has committed a relatively minor offence, has shown remorse and contrition and the children are of a tender age requiring special attention, the sentencing officer will be wary to send such a person to prison. Where, as is the situation with M, the primary caregiver is a recidivist who continues to commit crimes of a similar nature even whilst on bail and the children are relatively closer to their teens, it would be folly and a show of 'maudlin sympathy' to impose a non-custodial sentence. In such circumstances the primary caregiver may not escape a custodial sentence... As a court of final instance in all constitutional matters, it is imperative that this Court does not set a precedent which creates the impression that primary caregivers must be given a slap on the back of their wrists in spite of the seriousness of the offences they have committed.

Madala thus emphasised the fact that M had a prior conviction for fraud, which led him to conclude that, "M has not learnt from her previous brushes with the law" and that she lacked "remorse". Likewise, "it is reasonable to conclude that she was motivated by greed rather than need as she was gainfully employed at the time the offences were perpetrated". Finally, he considered the seriousness of fraud as a criminal offence and South Africa's high crime rate. These considerations, among others, led him to conclude that a prison sentence would, in this case, serve societal interests that outweighed the interests of M's children.

== Reception and significance ==
Sachs's judgment was widely admired, and the Guardian reported in 2009 that it was "cited in courts worldwide". It was welcomed in particular for elucidating the content of the paramountcy principle and providing guidance about whether and how the principle was to be balanced against conflicting interests. Similarly, Ann Skelton, who represented the amicus curiae in the proceedings, described it as "the Court's clearest and most detailed explanation to date of the content and scope of children's rights as set out in section 28 of the Constitution"; according to Skelton, the judgment "developed child law significantly", and Sachs's discussion of correctional supervision additionally contributed to the Constitutional Court's emerging jurisprudence on restorative justice. A 2019 survey by Skelton found that S v M was the most quoted of all cases in South African child law.

In the 2011 matter of S v S, the Constitutional Court considered how S v M should be applied in cases where the convicted parent was less unambiguously the sole or primary caregiver to her children; in that case, the majority held that S v M did not apply because the convicted parent was married and lived with her husband. Stephan Terblanche of the University of KwaZulu-Natal argued that, more generally, Sachs's guidelines in S v M were frequently ignored or only half-heartedly applied by courts.

== See also ==
- Prison reform in South Africa
