= Magajane v Chairperson, North West Gambling Board =

South African legal case

- Court: Constitutional Court of South Africa
- Full case name: Magajane v Chairperson, North West Gambling Board and Others
- Decided: 8 June 2006
- Docket nos.: CCT 49/05
- Citations: [2006] ZACC 8; 2006 (10) BCLR 1133 (CC); 2006 (5) SA 250; 2006 (2) SACR 447

Case history
- Appealed from: Isak Metsing Magajane v the Chairperson of the North West Gambling Board and Others (1008/04, 12 December 2004, unreported) in the High Court of South Africa, Bophuthatswana Provincial Division

Court membership
- Judges sitting: Langa CJ, Moseneke DCJ, Madala J, Mokgoro J, Ngcobo J, Nkabinde J, O'Regan J, Sachs J, Skweyiya J, van der Westhuizen J and Yacoob J

Case opinions
- Decision by: Van der Westhuizen J (unanimous)

Magajane v Chairperson, North West Gambling Board and Others is an important case in South African criminal procedure, decided by the Constitutional Court of South Africa on 8 June 2006. The court found that provisions of the North West Gambling Act, 2001 were unconstitutional insofar as they permitted warrantless inspections of private premises for the purposes of obtaining evidence for prosecuting illegal gambling. In a unanimous judgment written by Justice Johann van der Westhuizen, the court held that the relevant provisions imposed an unjustifiable limitation on the constitutional right to privacy.

== Background ==
Isaac Metsing Magajane was the manager of Las Vegas Gold in Lichtenburg in the North West Province. In August 2004, the establishment was subject to an inspection or raid by a team of law enforcement officers; though the team included some members of the South African Police Service, it was led by inspectors of the North West Gambling Board, a provincial agency established in terms of the North West Gambling Act, 2001. Section 65 of the same act empowered board inspectors to enter, search and seize property without a warrant if they suspected that illegal gambling was taking place on unlicensed premises.

Magajane launched an urgent application in the Mmabatho High Court, seeking a declarator that the entry, search and seizure violated the powers bestowed in section 65 of the North West Gambling Act. Alternatively, he sought a declarator that section 65 was inconsistent with the Constitution of South Africa. The High Court dismissed his application with costs in December 2004. However, Magajane appealed to the Constitutional Court of South Africa, which heard his constitutional challenge to the legislation on 23 February 2006.

== Judgment ==
On behalf of a unanimous court, Justice Johann van der Westhuizen upheld Magajane's appeal, finding that sections 65(1) and 65(2) of the North West Gambling Act violated the right to privacy, which was protected in section 14 of the Constitution. Those provisions were declared to be unconstitutional and invalid.

Van der Westhuizen held that warrantless inspections constituted a justifiable limitation on the right to privacy only when the statute authorising the regulatory inspection could not achieve its ends through less invasive means – for example, by requiring a warrant. Thus the court had to consider the applicant's expectation of privacy (per Mistry v Interim National Medical and Dental Council of South Africa) and the purpose of the enabling legislation.

In this case, section 65 served the worthy goal of enforcing the statute's regulation of the gambling industry. However, though the owner or occupier of a gambling business generally had a low reasonable expectation of privacy in the gambling premises, the statute enabled inspections of unlicensed premises in order to serve the aim of collecting evidence for criminal prosecution. Such inspections constituted significant intrusions. Moreover, the provisions were broad enough – and granted inspectors enough discretion – to permit searches in situations in which there is a reasonable expectation of privacy, such as "innocent activity in private homes". Finally, enforcement of the North West Gambling Act could be achieved through more limited means that would be less intrusive on the right to privacy: inspectors should be required to obtain warrants before searching unlicensed premises.

== Significance ==
Magajane is one among a family of cases that is regarded as having erected a significant legal barrier to warrantless searches in South Africa.

== See also ==
- Fourth Amendment to the United States Constitution
- Gaming law

== Bibliography ==
- Annual Survey of South African Law 2006. Pages 46 and 71.
- The Law of South Africa. Second Edition. LexisNexis. Durban. 2008. Volume 11. Durban. 2010. Volume 20. Part 1. Paragraphs 432 and 433 at page 421. Cumulative Supplement 2009. Volume 10(2). Paragraph 320.
- Current Law Case Citator 2007. Page 168.
- Nihal Jayawickrama. The Judicial Application of Human Rights Law. Second Edition. Cambridge University Press. 2017. Page 665.
- Anne Hughes. Human dignity and fundamental rights in South Africa and Ireland. Pretoria University Law Press. 2014. Pages 157, 267 and 449.
- Jean Meiring (ed). "2006". South Africa’s Constitution at Twenty-one. Penguin Books. 2017.
- Justin Collings. Scales of Memory: Constitutional Justice and Historical Evil. Oxford University Press. 2021. Page 259.
- "South Africa" [2006] Bulletin on Constitutional Case-law 300 at 303 and 305
- Kremnitzer, Steiner and Lang. Proportionality in Action. Cambridge University Press. 2020. Pages 200, 241 and 265.
- Niels Petersen. Proportionality and Judicial Activism. Cambridge University Press. 2017. Page 121.
- Niels Petersen. Verhältnismäßigkeit als Rationalitätskontrolle. Mohr Siebeck. 2015. Page 227.
- Christa Rautenbach, "South Africa: Teaching an Old Dog New Tricks?". Groppi and Ponthoreau (eds). The Use of Foreign Precedents by Constitutional Judges. Hart Publishing. 2013. Page 200. Andenæs and Fairgrieve (eds). Courts and Comparative Law. Oxford University Press. 2015. Page 368.
- Dario Milo. Defamation and Freedom of Speech. OUP. 2008. Page 126.
- Information and Communications Technology Law. LexisNexis. 2008. Page 353.
