= International Bioethics Committee =

The International Bioethics Committee (IBC) of UNESCO is a body composed of 36 independent experts from all regions and different disciplines (mainly medicine, genetics, law, and philosophy) that follows progress in the life sciences and its applications in order to ensure respect for human dignity and human rights. It was created in 1993 by Dr Federico Mayor Zaragoza, General Director of UNESCO at that time. It has been prominent in developing Declarations with regard to norms of bioethics that are regarded as soft law but are nonetheless influential in shaping the deliberations, for example, of research ethics committees (or Institutional review boards) and health policy.

== The functions of the International Bioethics Committee (IBC) ==
The functions of the International Bioethics Committee (IBC) are as follows:

-Promoting reflection on ethical and legal issues related to life sciences research and its applications, and encouraging the exchange of ideas and information, especially through education.

-Raising awareness among the public, experts, and policymakers in the public and private sectors involved in the field of bioethics.

-Collaborating with international governmental and non-governmental organizations concerned with bioethical issues, as well as with national and regional bioethics committees and similar entities.

== Universal Declaration on Human Genome and Human Rights ==
In 1993, the IBC was entrusted with the task of preparing an international instrument on the human genome, the Universal Declaration on the Human Genome and Human Rights, which was adopted by the General Conference of UNESCO in 1997 and endorsed by the General Assembly of the United Nations in 1998. The main purpose of this instrument is to protect the human genome from improper manipulations that may endanger the identity and physical integrity of future generations. To this end, it recognizes the human genome as "the heritage of humanity" (Article 1), and declares "contrary to human dignity" practices such as human cloning (Article 11) and germ-line interventions (Article 24). In addition, the Declaration intends to prevent genetic reductionism, genetic discrimination, and any use of genetic information that would be contrary to human dignity and human rights.

== International Declaration on Human Genetic Data ==
In 2003, the IBC issued a second global instrument, the International Declaration on Human Genetic Data, which may be regarded as an extension of the 1997 Declaration. This document sets out a number of rules for the collection, use and storage of human genetic data. It covers, among other issues, informed consent in genetics; confidentiality of genetic data; genetic discrimination; anonymization of personal genetic information; population-based genetic studies; the right not to know one’s genetic make up; genetic counselling; international solidarity in genetic research, and benefit sharing.

== Universal Declaration on Bioethics and Human Rights ==
The last global instrument drafted by the IBC is the Universal Declaration on Bioethics and Human Rights, which has a much broader scope than the two previous documents. It aims to provide a comprehensive framework of principles that should guide biomedical activities, in order to ensure that they are in conformity with international human rights law. The academic Thomas Alured Faunce has analysed this Declaration's non-binding social responsibility, technology transfer and transnational benefit principles which expressly apply to private and public corporations as well as states. He has argued that it has promoted a normative intersection between international human rights law and bioethics as academic disciplines. The Universal Declaration on Bioethics and Human Rights aims to establish the fundamental ethical principles that should guide scientific and medical practices worldwide. These principles, such as respect for human dignity, human rights, and fundamental freedoms, must be respected globally. The declaration also seeks to promote dialogue and the sharing of scientific and technological knowledge among different societies. It integrates bioethics into international human rights law to ensure the application of these rights to bioethical issues.
