= Mistry v Interim National Medical and Dental Council of South Africa =

South African legal case

Mistry v Interim National Medical and Dental Council of South Africa 1998 (4) SA 1127 (CC); 1998 (7) BCLR 880 (CC) is an important case in the South African law of medicine, constitutional law, constitutional litigation and criminal procedure.

In the area of constitutional litigation, the court dealt with an application for a certificate in terms of Rule 18 of the Constitutional Court Rules. And it held that the considerations relevant to deciding whether the certificate should be positive or negative are similar to those which should influence the court in deciding whether or not to grant leave to appeal to Supreme Court of Appeal (SCA): The High Court is required in both instances to consider

- whether or not there are reasonable prospects of success; and
- whether the issues raised are of sufficient substance to be dealt with by the SCA.

It was appropriate, in other words, that an application for a certificate in terms of Rule 18 be dealt with in the same manner as a conventional application for leave to appeal. In both instances, judgment on the application is required.

The case is also important, in this area of the law, for its treatment of the power of the Constitutional Court to suspend a declaration of invalidity, in the interests of justice and good government, pending a correction of the invalid statute by the competent authority. As a general rule, the court held, it will not suspend an order of invalidity, with exceptions to be made only when the reasons are good and persuasive. The party requesting the suspension carries the burden of proof; it must provide the court with reliable information to justify a suspension, indicating at the very least

- what negative consequences there may be for justice and good government of an immediately operational declaration of invalidity;
- why other existing measures would not be an adequate alternative stop-gap;
- what legislation on the subject, if any is in the pipeline, and
- how much time would reasonably be required to adopt the corrective legislation.

== Facts ==
Section 28(1) of the Medicines and Related Substances Control Act gave inspectors of medicines the authority to enter into and inspect any premises, place, vehicle, vessel or aircraft where such inspectors reasonably believed there were medicines or other substances regulated by the Act, and to seize any medicine or books, records or documents found in or upon such premises, place, vehicle, vessel or aircraft which appeared to afford evidence of a contravention of any provision of the Act. In short, this provision gave inspectors sweeping powers to search and seize without a warrant.

== Judgment ==
=== Chaskalson ===
==== Application for leave to appeal ====
As to the application for leave to appeal, Chaskalson P held, and the other members of the court concurred, that the considerations relevant to deciding whether a certificate in terms of Rule 18 of the Constitutional Court Rules should be positive or negative were "in many respects similar" to those which should influence a court in deciding whether or not to grant leave to appeal to the Supreme Court of Appeal. In both instances, the High Court was required to consider

- whether or not there were "reasonable prospects of success;" and
- whether the issues raised were "of sufficient substance" to be dealt with by the SCA.

"It is appropriate, therefore," Chaskalson concluded,

that an application for a certificate in terms of Rule 18 should be dealt with in the same manner as a conventional application for leave to appeal. In both instances a judgment on the application is required.

Having observed that "the purpose of the certificate is to assist this Court in the decision that it has to make as to whether or not leave to appeal should be granted," Chaskalson held that, where the relevant constitutional issues had been fully traversed in the judgment in respect of which the certificate had been given, there might be no need for a detailed judgment on the certificate.

Where, however, "the application for a certificate raises issues which have not been fully canvassed in the judgment, or where the reasoning in the judgment is subjected to challenge which calls for comment, the judgment on the certificate may have to be more comprehensive." Ultimately, what was necessary was that the High Court to which the application had been made should consider the issues identified in Rule 18(e) and give reasons for the findings made. Chaskalson applauded McLaren J for having done as much in the present matter.

=== Sachs ===
Sachs J held for a unanimous court that the existence of safeguards to regulate the way in which State officials may enter the private domains of ordinary citizens is one of the features that distinguish a constitutional democracy from a police state. Although, he wrote, there had been an admirable history of strong statutory controls over the powers of the police to search and seize, yet when it came to racially discriminatory laws and security legislation, vast and often unrestricted discretionary powers were conferred on officials and police.

Furthermore, he observed, generations of systematised and egregious violations of personal privacy had established norms of disrespect for citizens that had seeped generally into the public administration, and had promoted among a great many officials habits and practices inconsistent with the standards of conduct now required by the Bill of Rights.

The provision in the Medicines and Related Substances Control Act was found, accordingly, to be invalid.

==== Suspension of declaration of invalidity ====
Sachs turned next to the power of the Constitutional Court to suspend a declaration of invalidity, "in the interests of justice and good government," pending correction of the constitutional defect in the legislation by Parliament. He held that a party wishing for the court to make such an order had to provide it with "reliable information" to justify its doing so. This information would necessarily depend for its detail on "the nature of the law in question and the character of the defect to be corrected."

As a general rule, however, a government organ or other party wishing to keep an unconstitutional provision alive should indicate, "at least," the following:

- what the negative consequences for justice and good government of an immediately operational declaration of invalidity would be;
- why other existing measures would not be an adequate alternative stop-gap;
- what legislation on the subject, if any, was in the pipeline; and
- how much time would reasonably be required to adopt corrective legislation.

Parties interested in opposing such an order should be given an opportunity to motivate their opposition. Legal representatives should ensure that they have "appropriate and timeous instructions" on the matter; they should "not do their best while on their feet or else rely on a rushed telephone call at the tail-end of the hearing."

In the present matter, counsel for the Minister of Health and Mr Coote (the third and fourth respondents respectively) had requested by letter some days after the conclusion of the hearing that the court receive written evidence as to why it was imperative that the court make a declaration of specified inconsistency, rather than one of general invalidity. No notice was given to the applicant who, on being informed of the request, had indicated strenuous opposition. The request was refused. "These," Sachs held,

are matters that should be addressed at the earliest opportunity. If, for example, it is necessary to adduce evidence, this can be done under the proviso to s 102(1) of the interim Constitution prior to the referral of the matter to this Court. The issues should also be properly canvassed in the written arguments.

"Right at the end of the proceedings," the court's attention had been drawn by counsel for the respondents to the fact that section 28(1)(a) of the Act was due to be amended by the Medicines and Related Substances Control Amendment Act. On this Sachs held as follows:

Since we are not called upon to decide whether the new provisions relating to entry, search and seizure would be consistent with the Constitution and the principles outlined in the present judgment, I will say nothing further on the matter, and simply state that in my opinion there are no grounds upon which this Court could accede to the request by counsel to use its powers under s 98(5) to suspend the effect of a declaration of invalidity pending correction of its defects.

The order of invalidity, therefore, took immediate effect.

==== Retrospective effect ====
As to the power of the court to give retrospective effect to its order of invalidity, Sachs held that a general declaration of invalidity with the retrospective effect would impact negatively on good government by rendering unlawful all searches conducted after the retrospective date specified. This could create considerable uncertainty regarding the validity of proceedings conducted on the basis of evidence obtained as a result of such searches. It could also give rise to delictual claims by persons subjected to searches and seizures after that date, adding further burdens to a health budget already under considerable strain.

==== Obiter ====
Although the provision in the Medicines and Related Substances Control Act was struck down, Sachs J made an obiter comment to the effect that Chapter 2 of the Criminal Procedure Act appeared to be in line with constitutional requirements.

== Sources ==
- LTC Harms Civil Procedure in the Superior Courts 3 ed (2003).
