= Prison reform in South Africa =

South African prison system

This article identifies the historical reform patterns of the South African prison system, focusing on specific actors, social movements, and underlying socio-political factors that precipitated reform before the apartheid struggle and after 1994, transitioning into the current reform challenges facing the South African prison system.

== Prison system, pre-apartheid ==
Lasting colonial influence is ingrained in the South African prison system. The early stages of organized punishment in the country were brought forth by the arrival of European settlers, but imprisonment as punishment did not occur in Africa until the late 1800s. Prisons functioned to suppress and exploit populations that potentially might have posed a threat. The organization of a cohesive ordered prison system in South Africa took place earlier than other African countries, around the early 19th century. This was largely a result of an established economic interest resulting from the Atlantic slave trade and a concentration of African human capital afforded by organized imprisonment. In the early stages of prison development in South Africa, a culture of racial superiority was pervasive. While white prisoners received acceptable living conditions, fair treatment and vocational training in preparation for their release, black prisoners were perceived as "subhuman" and faced subjugation and scrutinisation for their supposed racial inadequacy.

The persistence of colonial influence and this cultural subjugation of racial inferiority through the South African prison system continued into the twentieth century. Until the 1940s, less reform and a greater emphasis on the organization and infrastructural development of South African prisons took place. This occurred amid growing interest in the ideological understanding of modernism and an increased international focus on the developmental potential of Africa. In a period of "rapid industrialization," the 1940s in South African was characterized by considerable urban migration, industrialization and technological development in an age of global war precipitated new transformations of ideological thought as well as new alignments and perceptions of social construction. In Germany, Jewish people and ethnic "others" were subdivided from the population and shipped to concentration camps across Eastern Europe. At the same time, racially-based conceptions of superiority also became widespread among colonial leaders in the African continent.

In South Africa, enduring colonialist concerns arose to comprise what was regarded as the "Native Question," which addressed how to manage Black Africans stereotyped by an image of "the wandering native". The "wandering native" became a caricature in justifying the South African threat of Black criminality. The perception was that an unemployed, unhoused Black African posed a serious threat to South African civil society, and liberal lawmakers devised a solution as to how best to punish him. Supported by the ideological savior-complex commonly known as the "White Man's Burden," prison systemization and reform would take shape in South Africa. Punishment as "an institution" became an outlet for white lawmakers to entrench a form of "social jurisdiction" as a presiding ideal for the modernization of society.

== Prison consolidation, post-World War II ==
To categorize the South African prison system following World War II, Natacha Filippi in "Deviance, Punishment, and Logics of Subjectification during Apartheid," explains that

"prisons were used to a significant extent as a means to protect the white minority against a contagion by pathological colonized populations, to ensure the economic exploitation of colonial subjects, and to assimilate seditious activity with an indigenous crime".

By 1948, the fabric of South African society remained systematically anchored by a discourse of racial discrimination. With South African prisons as the main institution to carry out punishment legitimized by racial superiority. Courts followed suit with "discriminatory verdicts and sentences". In the 1950s, a series of discriminatory laws were passed to enforce the systemization of apartheid. The indecencies that followed represent our current understanding of apartheid today. Apartheid was a regulated system of segregation legitimized by law. These laws emphasized the perceived dangerous nature of an urban black population. White lawmakers then restricted the freedoms of non-white populations. Targeted penal laws on alcoholism, drug dealing, and alleged impulses for violence led to a rise in arrests and incarcerations for Black South Africans.

As Black citizens were imprisoned in a subjective and racially-charged manner, the tense divisiveness of South African civil society became an epicenter for conflict and violence. During this period, Nelson Mandela began his twenty-seven-year prison sentence for unfounded allegations that he had conspired to overthrow the state. The country's external racial conflict intensified in the 1970s following the Township Insurrections, which led to the arrest of thousands under the Terrorism Act, 1967.

== South African prisons during the apartheid era ==
The apartheid prison system was primarily characterized by a "plethora of restraining laws," which increased the prison population, and sentencing of Black South Africans. In South Africa, cultural norms afforded the subjectivity of guilt to the assessment of whites. Black South Africans were adversely affected by this subjective enforcement of the law, and often spent extended years in prison for crimes they had not committed, but which white South Africans had condemned them for.

Within the prison, individuals were segregated based on race, gender, and conduct. It was along these lines that white and non-white prisoners were separated, and their meals, prison tasks, treatment, and punishment were contingent on their outward appearances. Underlying these lines was the sub-categorization of political, insane, and common-law prisoners. All non-white prisoners were considered unredeemable and requiring harsh punishment, while white prisoners were mostly perceived as being capable of institutional self-reform. During apartheid, prisons remained overcrowded and were disproportionately flooded with nonwhite prisoners. In Pollsmoor Prison in the Western Cape, an additional four new prison sectors were constructed to satisfy the overcrowding of inmates during the apartheid period. Political prisoners such as Nelson Mandela were kept separate and completely isolated from the outside world.

== List of post-apartheid reforms ==
List of General Republic-Era Reforms
Act Name	Year
Restitution of Land Rights Act, 1994 (Act No. 22 of 1994)	1994
Land Administration Act, 1995	1995
Promotion of National Unity and Reconciliation Act, 1995 (Act No. 34 of 1995)	1995
South African Citizenship Act, 1994 (Act No. 88 of 1995)	1995
South African Police Service Act, 1995 (Act No. 68 of 1995)	1995
Government Employees Pension Law, 1996	1996
Interim Protection of Informal Land Rights Act, 1996	1996
Land Reform (Labour Tenants) Act, 1996	1996
Higher Education Act, 1997 (Act No. 101 of 1997)	1997
Housing Act, 1997 (Act No. 107 of 1997)	1997
Identification Act, 1997 (Act No. 68 of 1997)	1997
Housing Consumers Protection Measures Act, 1998 (Act No. 95 of 1998)	1998
Employment Equity Act, 1998 (Act No. 55 of 1998)	1998
Further Education and Training Act, 1998 (Act No. 98 of 1998)	1998
Maintenance Act, 1998 (Act No. 99 of 1998)	1998
National Prosecuting Authority Act, 1998	1998
Prevention of Organised Crime Act, 1998 (Act No. 121 of 1998)	1998
Promotion of Equality and Prevention of Unfair Discrimination Act, 2000 (Act No. 4 of 2000)	2000
General and Further Education and Training Quality Assurance Act, 2001 (Act No. 58 of 2001)	2001
Media Development and Diversity Agency Act, 2002 (Act No. 14 of 2002)	2002
Further Education and Training Colleges Act, 2006 (Act No. 16 of 2006)	2006
Government Immovable Asset Management Act, 2007	2007
Legal Aid South Africa Act, 2014 (Act No. 39 of 2014)	2014

As a result of international outcry as well as the efforts from South African organizations such as the Black Sash, political prisoners and nonwhite prisoners gradually saw an equitable allocation of rights following the apartheid era in South Africa. The South African resistance movement gained traction and soon garnered a global following, and the end of apartheid culminated in a wave of transformative reform initiatives in 1994, which targeted the country's various structural inequalities. The unlawful imprisonment of Mandela brought increased scrutiny to the efficacy of the country's fundamental institutions of governance. Particular institutions administering justice and constitutional development, land affairs, education, health services, as well as housing and labor initiatives, were particularly restructured to establish equitable pathways for the Black South Africans who were re-entering a newly desegregated civil society. For South Africa's prison system, international diplomatic forces such as the United Nations and civil rights NGOs undertook particular reform efforts within the country.

=== Kampala Declaration ===
The Kampala declaration was passed to safeguard human rights and invite third-party NGOs as enforcers of equal treatment (Sekhonyane, 2005). By establishing a legal charter of human rights recommendations to African prisoners, tangible reform was observed in South Africa as a result of the Kampala Declaration (Sekhonyane, 2005).

=== Ouagadougou Conference ===
In 2002, the Ouagadougou Conference offered a follow-up analysis of prison reform progress that had been made following the Kampala Declaration (Sekhonyane, 2005). The conference followed with a declaration among African countries to reduce their prison populations and promote a universal African charter regarding prisoner's rights (Sekhonyane, 2005).

=== UN Standard Minimum Rules for the Treatment of Prisoners (Mandela Rules) ===
In 2015, the United Nations adopted over the Mandela Rules, 120 rules that "represent, as a whole, the minimum conditions which are accepted as suitable" for the universal treatment of prisoners.

=== Correctional Services Act 111 of 1998 ===
Section 134 of the Correctional Services Act lists the twenty-one regulations sanctioned by South African prisons to provide for its population:

"CUSTODY OF ALL PRISONERS UNDER CONDlTlONS OF HUMAN DIGNITY"
No.	Regulation	Condition No. 1
1	Admission	"The Head of Prison or any correctional official authorised by him or her must take into safekeeping the money, valuables and any other articles in the possession of a prisoner on admission to the prison or during the period of imprisonment…”
2	Accommodation	"In every prison provision must be made for general sleeping and in-patient hospital accommodation, consisting of single or communal cells or both…”
3	Nutrition	"Each prisoner must be provided with a diet consisting of a minimum protein and energy content of (a) 2 000 kilo calories per day for adult females; (b) 2 500 kilo calories per day for adult males; and (c) 2 800 kilo calories per day for children, between the ages of 13 and 18 years of which at least 0.8 grams per kilogram of body weight per day must be from the protein group…”
4	Clothing and Bedding	"On admission to a prison, a sentenced prisoner must be provided with a complete outfit of clothing and bedding as prescribed by Order and only the clothing issued may be worn, except when otherwise determined by the Commissioner…”
5	Exercise	"The medical officer must certify whether the following categories of prisoners are fit to exercise: (a) a prisoner who is injured, ill or complains that he or she is injured or ill; (b) a prisoner who receives any prescribed medicines and or medical treatment; (c) a prisoner who receives continued or additional medical treatment; and (d) a prisoner who is pregnant…”
6	Health Care	"(a) Primary health care must be available in a prison at least on the same level as that rendered by the State to members of the community. (b) When a prison is built, specifications must set for that part of the facility which will be used for the purposes of health care… “
7	Contact with Community	"The Head of Prison must give special attention to the development and maintenance of good family relationships between prisoners and their family members and other relatives. Death in prison…”
8	Death in Prison	"(a) The Head of Prison must keep a record and report all deaths in prison, such record and report must reflect all the particulars required by Order. (b) A deceased prisoner must be buried by the Head of Prison at a burial place in the magisterial district where he or she was detained, but the Commissioner may, upon written request of the spouse, partner or next of kin allow them to remove and bury the deceased at their own expense. For humanitarian reasons the Commissioner may at the written request of the spouse, partner or next of kin, allow the deceased prisoner to be transported at State expense to another magisterial district. The cost of the burial is to be born by the person requesting the transportation as prescribed by Order…”
9	Development and Support Services	(a) Social work services must be rendered to sentenced prisoners and persons under community corrections who have a need for such services. Those services may be rendered only by a social worker duly registered as such in terms of the Social Work Act, 1978 (Act No. 11 0 of 1978). (b) If the need for social work services arises at a prison or community corrections office where those services are not available, the relevant Head of Prison or Head of Community Corrections, as the case may be, must take the necessary steps to ensure that those services are made available as soon as possible to cater for that need...”
10	Recreation	"Recreational activities as prescribed by Order must be provided in all prisons for the benefit of the mental and physical health of prisoners.”
11	Access to Legal Advice	"A prisoner may consult with his or her legal practitioner in connection with legal matters subject to the conditions determined by the Commissioner…”
12	Reading Material	"A properly organised library containing literature of constructive and educational value, as prescribed by Order, must as far as reasonably practicable, be established and maintained at every prison…”
13	Discipline	"The disciplinary hearing must be conducted as soon as possible, and if practicable within 14 days from the date the accused prisoner was informed of the charge against him or her, such notification may not be less than 7 days before the hearing…”
14	Safe Custody	"The Commissioner determines the security measures applicable at prisons. “
15	Searches	"must be undertaken in the prison hospital, clinic or public hospital depending on the procedure necessary to conduct the search; will not include the administering of vomitories or enemas; and must at all times be witnessed by a correctional official of the same gender as the prisoner, who must record the outcome of the search…”
16	Identification	"The name, age, height, mass, full address, distinctive marks of a prisoner and other particulars as may be required must be recorded in the manner prescribed by Order…”
17	Mechanical Restraints	"If a prisoner is restrained by means of mechanical restraints a correctional official may only use one or more of the following mechanical restraints: (a) handcuffs; (b) leg-irons and-cuffs; (c) belly chains; (d) plastic cable ties; (e) electronically activated high-security transport stun belts; or (f) patient restraints, where applicable…”
18	Non-lethal Incapacitating Devices	"The only non-lethal incapacitating devices that may be used by a correctional official are the following: (a) chemical agents; (b) electronically activated devices; or (c) rubber missiles..."
19	Firearms	"Whenever a firearm is fired. except for the purpose of training, the correctional official must report the incident and the action taken, in the manner prescribed by Order, to the Head of Prison, or the Head of Community Corrections as soon as practicable…”
20	Other Weapons	"Other weapons that may be used are: (a) Baton-type equipment; and (b) Pyrotechnical equipment…”

=== White Papers on Corrections ===
In November 2004, the White Papers were approved to replace the previous prison strategy which was implemented in 1994. It places a large emphasis on the rehabilitation of offenders in South African prisons. This document states the current challenges faced by the Department of Correctional Services regarding the correctional cycle, and lists new financial programs that would be launched to help combat these challenges. These programs consist of Correction, Security, Facilities, Development, and After Care.

Most importantly, the contents in the White Papers have the overarching theme of trying to achieve the goals set in place by the Department of Correctional Services: Human Dignity, Equality, Rights underlying humane treatment of every detainee, The right to health care services and other associated rights, Freedom and security of the person, Children's rights, The right to education, Freedom of religion, Intergovernmental relations, and Values and principles governing Public Administration.

== Modern domestic challenges to prison reform ==
=== Overcrowding ===
A major issue in South African prisons involves the ballooning number of sentenced and un-sentenced prisoners in the country. Coinciding with the end of the apartheid era, prison populations in South Africa increased by "116,846 in January 1995 to 187,036 by the end of 2004," a 60% uptick (Giffard, 2006). Overcrowding in prison populations can be mitigated by the release of unsentenced prisoners awaiting trial, but this does not address the challenges to prison reform posed by overcrowding itself. The prison administration attributes the main reasons for overcrowding to the backlog of court cases, the lack of response from the courts and their reluctance to release prisoners awaiting trial.

With an increase in South African prison populations, prisoners are denied an equal, shared comprehensive access to the limited capacity of health services and government resources afforded to them. According to the World Prison Brief, the occupancy level of South Africa's prisons is at 137.4% of their official capacity (WPB, 2019). While numbers have stabilized over the past five years, it remains unclear "whether the rise in the prison population is due primarily to more criminals being sentenced or the increase in the average length of sentences being served" (IRR, 2012). Pre-trial detention centres and prisons in urban centres such as Johannesburg, Durban and Cape Town are generally the most overcrowded. Some prisons have a low overall population density, while at the same time having units operating well beyond their capacity.

=== Racial discrimination ===
As in the United States, South African prisons are not only overcrowded but also have highly disproportionate racial demographics. According to Africa Check, at the end of 2016, more than 125,000 Black Africans occupied South Africa's prisons in comparison to over 28,500 colored South Africans, 2,500 White South Africans, and 880 Asian/Indian groups (Africa Check, 2018). This means that more than 98% of South Africa's prisons are occupied by persons of color, in contrast to a white population of under 2%. With such high racial stratification within South African prison populations today, the continued precedence for facilities to remain overcrowded is likely. This is evident because coercive administration methods, skewed demographics, and insufficient mitigation efforts have long surrounded the South African prison system. This has contributed to an overall lack of oversight quality and delayed responsiveness for continued reform after the initial strides of the post-apartheid period.

=== Maltreatment of prisoners ===
Five persons who were inmates of Leeuwkop Prison in August 2014, claimed damages in 2022 for supposed injuries sustained in acts of brutal turture. They also claimed that they were unlawfully placed in solitary confinement without bedding and without treatment of their injuries. Their lawyers argued that there was a cover-up of the assaults. According to Lawyers for Human Rights, the case which resorts under the Prevention of Combating and Torture of Persons Act, is the first of its type in South Africa and will set a precedent for accountability of correctional services officials involved in the crime of torture.

Cases of ill-treatment are frequently reported to the National Preventive Mechanism. Civil society organisations report that incidents are not always reported by prisoners for fear of reprisals.

== Bibliography ==
- South Africa, 1998. Correctional Services Act 111 of 1998.
- Chris Giffard, and Lukas Muntingh. "The Effect of Sentencing on the Size of the South African Prison Population." Open Society Foundation for South Africa, October 2006, 87.
- Gopolang Makou, Ina Skosana, and Ruth Hopkins. "FACTSHEET: The State of South Africa's Prisons.” Africa Check, June 12, 2018. https://africacheck.org/factsheets/factsheet-the-state-of-south-africas-prisons/.
- Jeremy Sarkin. “Prisons in Africa: An Evaluation from a Human Rights Perspective.” Sur International Human Rights Journal 9 (March 31, 2009): 22–49.
- Kelly Gillespie. Containing the ‘Wandering Native’: Racial Jurisdiction and the Liberal Politics of Prison Reform in 1940s South Africa. Taylor and Francis 37, no. 3 (September 14, 2011): 499–515.
- “List of South African Legislation." Legislation Database. Kyalami, South Africa: ACTS Online, 2020. https://www.acts.co.za/site_search.
- Makubetse Sekhonyane. March 16, 2005. Prison Reform in Africa: Recent Trends
- “More Prisoners of Just Longer Sentences?" South African Institute of Race Relations, 2012. https://irr.org.za/media/media-releases/05Mar12.More_prisoners.pdf.
- Natacha Philippi. Deviance, Punishment and Logics of Subjectification during Apartheid: Insane, Political and Common-Law Prisoners in a South African Gaol. Taylor and Francis 37, no. 3 (2011): 627–43.
- “Regulation Gazette." Section 134. July 30, 2004. Correctional Services Act 111 of 1998.
- Dullah Omar Institute, 2019. South Africa: Prison Reform Legislation in South Africa. South Africa. Africa Criminal Justice Reform
- World Prison Brief. "South Africa." World Prison Brief Data, 2019. https://www.prisonstudies.org/country/south-africa.
