= Allan Hutchinson =

British-Canadian lawyer (born 1951)

Allan C. Hutchinson, FRSC (born 1951) is a British-Canadian lawyer and legal theorist who is currently a distinguished research professor at Osgoode Hall Law School.
