= Albie Sachs =

South African anti-Apartheid activist (born 1935)

Justice Albert Sachs
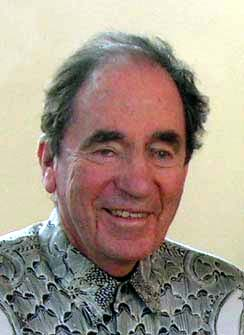

Justice of the Constitutional Court
- In office October 1994 – October 2009
- Nominated by: Judicial Service Commission
- Appointed by: Nelson Mandela

Personal details
- Born: Albert Louis Sachs; 30 January 1935 (age 91)
- Spouses: Stephanie Kemp (m. 1966; div. 1980) Vanessa September (m. 2006)
- Children: 3
- Parents: Emile Solomon "Solly" Sachs; Rachel "Ray" (née Ginsberg) Sachs Edwards
- Education: South African College School; University of Cape Town (BA, LLB); University of Sussex (PhD)
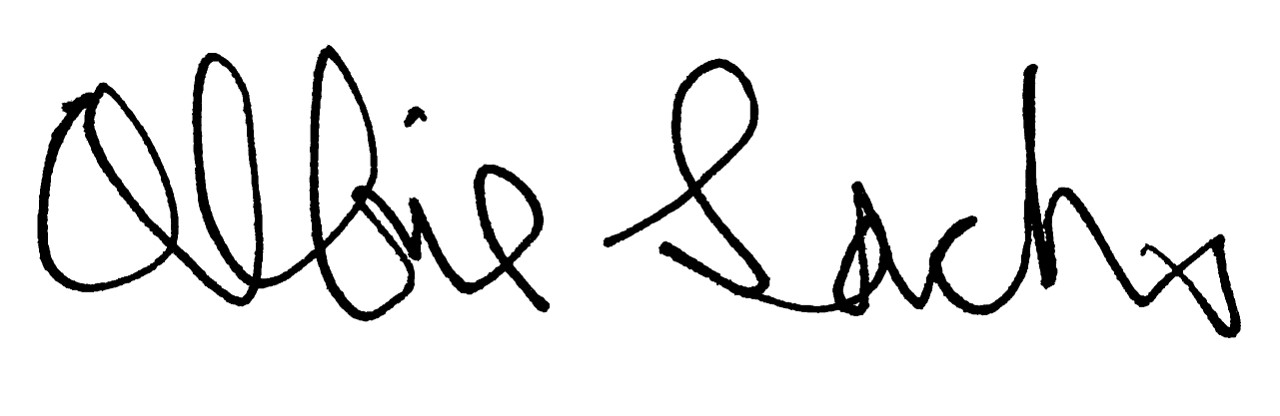
- Signature

Albert Louis Sachs OLS (born 30 January 1935), known as Albie Sachs, is a South African lawyer, activist, writer, and former judge appointed to the first Constitutional Court of South Africa by Nelson Mandela.

== Early life and education ==
Albie Sachs was born in Johannesburg at the Florence Nightingale Hospital to Emile Solomon "Solly" Sachs, General Secretary to the Garment Workers' Union of South Africa, and Rachel "Ray" (née Ginsberg) Sachs (later Edwards). Both his mother and father were Lithuanian Jews who fled to South Africa as children with their parents whom were escaping persecution against Jews in the Russian Empire (now Lithuania). Sachs' parents shared that at the time they left, the attacks against them had become so violent that "Every Easter, the Cossacks would ride into the villages and say, 'The Jews killed Christ, we're going to kill the Jews.' And my grandparents and others were fleeing into the forests and basements of buildings... so they wanted to escape."

Both of his parents were politically active and his father expressed the desire that Sachs "grow up to be a soldier in the fight for liberation." His mother was a member of the South African Communist Party and worked as a typist for its general secretary Moses Kotane. Sachs said that Kotane's presence in his family's life, in particular the way he was admired by Sachs's mother, made it clear to him that racism was absurd, inhuman, and unjust.

His parents separated when he was a toddler and he moved with his mother and younger brother Johnny to a modest beachside home in Cape Town. Sachs excelled in school and was moved forward two grades, in part due to a shortage of schoolteachers in South Africa during World War II. He attended South African College Schools, where he edited the school magazine, for junior and high school before graduating. He started law school at the University of Cape Town at the age of 15, and won a prize for English in his first year. He was admitted to the bar in South Africa and began practicing law at 21, and became an advocate for those being prosecuted under racist and oppressive laws, including people who opposed apartheid.

== Activism and exile ==
On 6 April 1952, white South Africans commemorated 300 years since the arrival of Dutch colonisers, particularly Jan van Riebeeck. Many also celebrated the recent electoral victory of the National Party and the introduction of the word apartheid to the English language. Sachs, then a second-year law student, joined two hundred Black South Africans at a meeting to support the African National Congress (ANC), the National Party's opposition, in a working-class area of Cape Town. The ANC launched their Defiance Campaign Against Unjust Laws the same day. Though Sachs was initially told that the Defiance Campaign was a Black campaign led by Black people, he later led a group of young white South Africans to sit in chairs reserved for Black South Africans at the post office. In 1955, Sachs attended the Congress of the People in Kliptown. More than 2,000 delegates supporting the ANC adopted the Freedom Charter, which envisaged equal rights for all in a future South Africa that "belongs to all that live in it, black and white."

As part of the opposition, Sachs was subject to predawn raids by the security police and governmental restrictions on his activities, including meeting with more than one person at any given time. He was also banned from publishing. He was eventually arrested and detained in solitary confinement under the 90-Day Detention Law. He was released after three months but was promptly rearrested and held for an additional seventy-eight days. He was arrested again in 1966, which he described as the "worst moment of [his] life." He was subjected to a spell of sleep deprivation by a security team whose head had been trained in torture methods by the French Directorate-General for External Security in Algeria. Upon his release, he was given permission to leave South Africa under the condition that he never return.

=== England ===
Sachs left for England accompanied by Stephanie Kemp, a former client and later cellmate. They married, had children, and continued their anti-apartheid work in the London branch of the ANC. His ANC work brought him to different countries in Europe but he was denied entry to the United States, which regarded the ANC as a terrorist organisation. After policy changes, he was able to visit the US, where he attended the Trial of the Chicago 7 at the invitation of the lawyers defending the Black Panthers. Sachs supported Bobby Seale and later met Black Panther leader Huey P. Newton.

Sachs attended Sussex University with financial aid from the Joseph Rowntree Charitable Trust and completed his doctorate in 1970 under Norman Cohn and G. I. A. D. Draper. His thesis, titled Justice in South Africa, was published in both the UK and the USA but was banned in South Africa, with those in possession of it facing prison time. Between 1970 and 1977, Sachs was a lecturer in the law faculty at the University of Southampton, where he wrote Sexism and the Law with historian Joan Hoff-Wilson. He also published The Jail Diary of Albie Sachs, which illustrated his time in detainment, in 1966 and Stephanie on Trial, which covered Kemp's imprisonment and his second arrest, in 1968.

=== Mozambique ===
Sachs moved to the newly independent Mozambique in 1977, where he worked as a law professor at the Eduardo Mondlane University in Maputo and studied Portuguese to fluency. He was later the Ministry of Justice's Director of Research. While in Mozambique, Sachs visited the ANC headquarters in Lusaka, Zambia, at the invitation of Oliver Tambo, where Tambo asked him to draft a code of conduct for the ANC that forbade the use of torture and highlighted the party's democratic principles. The ANC adopted it as a binding policy after it was presented by Sachs at a conference in Kabwe in 1985.

Sachs helped lay the foundations for the future constitution of South Africa by serving as a scribe and provided Tambo with legal support.

=== Assassination attempt and aftermath ===
On 7 April 1988, Sachs opened the door to his car and it exploded. Sachs lost his right arm and vision in his left eye, and a passerby was killed. He was stabilized in Mozambique, then flown to London Hospital to recover. There, he received a letter promising he would be avenged. Sachs decided to seek not revenge, but "soft vengeance." This "soft vengeance" would take the form of getting freedom in a new non-racial and democratic South Africa based on human rights and the rule of law.

After recovering from the attack, Sachs established and became the founding director of the South African Constitutional Studies Centre at the University of London. He then flew to Dublin to work on the first draft of South Africa's Bill of Rights along with Kader Asmal under the direction of the ANC. In early 1989, Sachs went to the US to work with Jack Greenberg at the Columbia School of Law and Louis Henkin at the School of International and Public Affairs.

He attended a Law and Justice Seminar in Aspen, Colorado moderated by Supreme Court Justice Harry Blackmun, whose personal physician spoke about the intersection of his Catholic identity and his opposition to abortion and his belief that his own beliefs should not be forced on others with different beliefs. Despite the physician's staunch objection to abortion, he supported the passing of Roe v Wade. Sachs took from this the idea of the relationship between the sacred and the secular, which would later influence his own judgments.

While in the US, Sachs also learned to use a computer and wrote The Soft Vengeance of a Freedom Fighter, where he reflected on his recovery.

== Return to South Africa ==
Sachs returned to South Africa in 1990 after the unbanning of the ANC and other political organizations and the release of Nelson Mandela. There, he worked at the University of the Western Cape (UWC) in the law faculty with Dullah Omar and was appointed honorary professor at the University of Cape Town after his lecture Perfectibility and Corruptibility. He continued working with the ANC's Constitutional Committee and in 1990 published Protecting Human Rights in South Africa. This book contained the controversial paper Preparing Ourselves for Freedom, which proposed that the ANC stop saying that "culture is a weapon of struggle" by arguing that the sociopolitical impact of culture was too complex and full of ambiguity to be reduced to "a weapon that simply fired in one direction." Sachs was elected to the ANC's National Executive Committee in 1991 ahead of the ANC's first conference in South Africa. He worked with UWC to organized workshops on electoral systems, land rights, regional government, and affirmative action, among other topics. In December 1992, Sachs worked on ANC's team during negotiations for a new constitutional order.

Sachs also served on Working Group Two, which dealt with the nature of the South African State and the process for constitution-making. CODESA negotiations broke down but were later resumed as the Multi-Party Negotiation Process, which led to the drafting of the Interim Constitution. This provided for South Africa's first democratic elections, which would populate its Parliament. Parliamentary members formed the Constitutional Assembly and drafted the final version of the Constitution.

The interim Constitution also provided for the creation of an independent Constitutional Court, which would ensure that fundamental rights would be upheld during the Constitution-making period both to ensure and to certify that the text of the final text Constitution complied with the 34 Principles agreed to during negotiations.

Sachs has been widely credited as the "chief architect" of the post-apartheid 1996 Constitution, a label that he firmly rejects, insisting that the Constitution was the product of large groups of people working over many years and culminating in the intense work of the Constitutional Assembly, of which he was not even a member. He has said that, if one were to do a paternity test on South Africa's Constitution, that Oliver Tambo's DNA would be revealed.

== Constitutional Court and judicial career ==
In 1994, following South Africa's first democratic elections, Sachs resigned from the ANC's National Executive Committee and pursued a position on the country's newly established Constitutional Court. He was selected later that year by Mandela as a founding member of the Court. In addition to his judicial duties, Sachs and Justice Yvonne Mokgoro put together the Court's art collection, which relayed its dedication to humanity and social interdependence in the newly democratic South Africa. His appointment inspired initial controversy, primarily due to his interview with the Judicial Service Commission. Here, Sachs was asked about his role in a report downplaying the ANC's indefinite detention and solitary confinement of Umkhonto we Sizwe commander Thami Zulu. Thami Zulu was killed in Lusaka in 1989, and the ANC never carried out an investigation about who in the ANC had murdered. Sachs received criticism from other politicians and lawyers, which he felt was unfair given his central role in ending torture in ANC camps. Sachs worked on a number of landmark cases, including Minister of Home Affairs v Fourie and the Prisoners' Right to Vote.

=== August v Electoral Commission (1999) ===
After the Electoral Commission of South Africa declared that prisoners would be barred from voting in the general elections, the Court considered whether they were denying a fundamental right. The Court unanimously agreed that withholding the right to vote from prisoners was unconstitutional and would be observed only under an Act of Parliament that was compatible with the Constitution. Sachs wrote: "The universality of the franchise is important not only for nationhood and democracy. The vote of each and every citizen is a badge of dignity and personhood."

=== Christian Education South Africa v Minister of Education (2000) ===
Christian Education South Africa v Minister of Education questioned whether Parliament had unconstitutionally limited religious rights by prohibiting corporal punishment in schools. Sachs argued that corporal punishment infringed on the rights of children, and pointed to Section 12 of the South African Constitution, which extends the rights to freedom, security, and protection from "all forms of violence whether from public or private sources." Sachs wrote that "[B]elievers cannot claim an automatic right to be exempted by their beliefs from the laws of the land. At the same time, the state should, wherever reasonably possible, seek to avoid putting believers to extremely painful and intensely burdensome choices of either being true to their faith or else respectful of the law." Sachs felt that the case would have been enriched had by a children's advocate appointed by the State.

=== Port Elizabeth Municipality v Various Occupiers (2004) ===
In Port Elizabeth Municipality v Various Occupiers, Port Elizabeth officials filed for the eviction of unhoused people living on unused, private land. The Court unanimously agreed that the group should not be evicted in support of the "right not to be arbitrarily deprived of a home." Sachs added, "Ubuntu is a unifying motif of the Bill of Rights, which is nothing if not a structured, institutionalized and operational declaration in our evolving new society of the need for human interdependence, respect and concern."

=== Minister of Home Affairs v Fourie (2005) ===
Sachs wrote the Court's majority judgement in Minister of Home Affairs v Fourie declaring that South Africa's statute defining marriage to be between one man and one woman was unconstitutional for not including same-sex couples. He stated that the Parliament was obligated to amend the Marriage Act to reflect the inclusion written into the Constitution and that the Court itself would make the changes if Parliament did not act within a year. He wrote that "the Constitution acknowledges the variability of human beings [genetic and socio-cultural], affirms the right to be different, and celebrates the diversity of the nation." The Civil Union Act came from this decision and relied more heavily on the gender-neutral "spouse." Justice Kate O'Regan criticised Sachs for not taking immediate action on the changes and assigning that responsibility to Parliament instead.

=== Laugh It Off Promotions CC v South African Breweries International (2005) ===
In Laugh It Off Promotions v South African Breweries, the Court held that the parodied use of a trademark on a t-shirt should not be interdicted, because the detriment to the owners intellectual property rights was small and far outweighed by free speech rights. In a separate concurring judgment Sachs wrote, "Does the law have a sense of humor?... A society that takes itself too seriously risks bottling up its tensions and treating every example of irreverence as a threat to its existence. Humor is one of the great solvents of democracy. It permits the ambiguities and contradictions of public life to be articulated in non-violent forms. It promotes diversity. It enables a multitude of discontents to be expressed in a myriad of spontaneous ways. It is an elixir of constitutional health."

=== Volks v Robinson (2005) and Jane Bwanya v The Master of the High Court, Cape Town (2021) ===
Volks v Robinson looked at whether a law providing for surviving spouses to receive maintenance from a deceased person's estate was unconstitutional on the grounds that it did not include unmarried cohabitants. While the majority of the Court did not find this discriminatory, Sachs strongly disagreed: "[S]hould a person who has shared her home and life with her deceased partner, borne and raised children with him, cared for him in health and in sickness, and dedicated her life to support the family they created together, be treated as a legal stranger to his estate, with no claim for subsistence because they were never married?" The Court's majority decision was overturned in 2021 in Bwanya v Master of the High Court in favour of Sachs' argument.

=== S v M (2007) ===
S v M brought the Court a case wherein a woman, referred to as M, faced jail time for repeated credit fraud, even while out on bail. Sachs initially planned to dismiss the case but, in talking with his colleagues, he learned that M was a single parent of three teenagers living in an area with high levels of gang and drug activity and violence. She was also the owner and operator of two small businesses and was a member of the school governing board. Sachs accepted the case on the grounds of the children's right to parental care. He ruled in their interest, emphasizing that "foundational to the enjoyment of the right to childhood is the promotion of the right as far as possible to live in a secure and nurturing environment free from violence, fear, want and avoidable trauma."

=== Judicial Retirement ===
Sachs retired in October 2009 after fifteen years in the Court. Justices Pius Langa, Yvonne Mokgoro and Kate O'Regan also retired. In 2010, he described his judicial career as "joyous and exhilarating, but also exhausting, complicated and problematic." Sachs has stayed active and in the public eye since his retirement from the Court. The Guardian has described him as "arguably the world's most famous judge."

== Lecturing and consultancy ==
Sachs has remained active in his retirement and travels around the world to lecture or act as a consultant. He works to promote restorative justice, gender equality, and constitutional democracy. He worked with Canadian Supreme Court Justice Claire L'Heureux-Dubé to encourage Supreme Court judges in Sri Lanka and Nepal to approach their roles with greater gender sensitivity. Sachs traveled in his early years as well, speaking to the Northern Irish during The Troubles, Sri Lankans during the Tamil Tiger Rebellion, and Colombians and the Revolutionary Armed Forces of Colombia in support of the Colombian peace process. In 1999, he visited Guyana on behalf of the National Democratic Institute to meet with political and civil society leaders to discuss political accommodation and constitution-making.

In 1997, he was appointed by UNESCO to the International Bioethics Committee to help with drafting the Universal Declaration on the Human Genome and Human Rights He also spent 15 months in Kenya as a commonwealth judge and served on the Kenya Judges and Magistrates Vetting Board. In 2021, he served as a judge at the World Human Rights Moot Court Competition as part of the University of Pretoria's Mandela Day celebration in Geneva.

As of August 2022, Sachs is a trustee for the Constitutional Hill Trust, the Oliver and Adelaide Tambo Foundation, and the Albie Sachs Trust for Constitutionalism and the Rule of Law. He also served on the International Cricket Council's Disciplinary Appeals Board for many years.

== Publications ==
=== Books ===
- The Jail Diary of Albie Sachs - 1966, Harvill Press - ISBN 9780586090572
- Stephanie on Trial - 1968, Harvill Press ISBN 9780352329028
- Justice in South Africa - 1973, University of California Press - ISBN 9780520026247
- Protecting Human Rights in a New South Africa - 1990, Oxford University Press - ISBN 9780195706093
- The Soft Vengeance of a Freedom Fighter - 1990, Grafton - ISBN 9780246136749
- Advancing Human Rights in South Africa - 1992, Oxford University Press - ISBN 9780195708141
- The Free Diary of Albie Sachs - 2004, Random House
- The Strange Alchemy of Life and Law - 2009, Oxford University Press - ISBN 9780199605774
- We, the People: Insights of an Activist Judge - 2016, University of the Witwatersrand Press - ISBN 9781868149988
- Oliver Tambo's Dream: Four Lectures - 2017, African Lives - ISBN 9780620779593

=== Essays ===
- Preparing Ourselves for Freedom: Culture and the ANC Constitutional Guidelines – 1991, TDR - doi:10.2307/1146119
- Tales of Terrorism and Torture: The Soft Vengeance of Justice (in Confronting Torture) - 2018, University of Chicago Press - doi:10.7208/9780226529554-003

=== As a co-author ===
- Sexism and the Law: A Study of Male Beliefs and Legal Bias in Britain and the United States with Joan Hoff-Wilson - 1978, Free Press - ISBN 9780855201265
- Island in Chains: Prisoner 885/63: Ten Years on Robben Island with Indres Naidoo - 1982, Penguin Books - ISBN 9780140060539
- Spring is Rebellious: Arguments about Cultural Freedom with Ingrid de Kok - 1990, Buchu Books - ISBN 9780958305716
- Liberating the Law: Creating Popular Justice in Mozambique with Gita Honwana-Welch - 1990, Zed Books - ISBN 9780862329204

== Honours and awards ==
Year	Award	Awarding Body	Contribution	Ref
1991	Sunday Times CNA Literary Awards	Sunday Times	Soft Vengeance of a Freedom Fighter	
2006	President of South Africa	Order of Luthuli in silver	Excellent contributions	
2006	President of Portugal	Medal of Freedom		
2009	Academy of Achievement	Golden Plate Award		
2009	Institute for Justice and Reconciliation	Reconciliation Award	"For realising reconciliation through his life and work."	
2010	Sunday Times CNA Literary Awards	Sunday Times	Strange Alchemy of Life and Law	
2010	Ford's Theatre Society (presented by Ruth Bader Ginsburg)	Lincoln Medal	Human rights activism	
2014	The Tang Prize Foundation	Tang Prize - Rule of Law	"for his many contributions to human rights and justice globally through an understanding of the rule of law in which the dignity of all persons is respected and the strengths and values of all communities are embraced..."	
2014	University College Dublin	Ulysses Medal	Outstanding global contribution	
2021	President of France	Legion of Honour	Contributions to human rights, racial equality, democracy, and social justice	
2022	Inaugural Lifetime Achievement Award, (presented by Michelle Obama)	Clooney Foundation for Justice, The Albies	Lifetime dedicated to the pursuit of justice	
Unknown	President of Brazil	Order of the Southern Cross		
Unknown	Lincoln's Inn	Honorary Bencher		
Unknown	John Brunner	Martin Luther King Memorial Prize	Island in Chains (with Indres Naidoo)	
Unknown	Harvard Law School Project on Disability (HPOD)	HOPD Award for the Betterment of Humanity		

=== Honorary degrees ===
Sachs holds honorary doctorates from the following universities:

- York University (1994)
- University of Antwerp (2000)
- University of Sussex (2003)
- University of Cape Town (2006)
- University of Edinburgh (2007)
- Ulster University (2008)
- University of York (2010)
- Princeton University (2010)
- University of New South Wales (2010)
- University of Southern California (2011)
- Polytechnic University (Maputo, Mozambique) (2011)
- University of Dundee (2012)
- University of London (2013)
- University of Strathclyde (2013)
- University of Aberdeen (2013)
- University of Witwatersrand (2014)
- University of Cambridge (2014)
- Wayne State University (2017)
- Michigan State University (2018)
- NOVA University of Lisbon
- Columbia University (2019)
- University of Missouri (2019)
- University of Roehampton (2022)
- University of the Free State
- University of Massachusetts Amherst (2022)
- University of Southampton (Unknown date)
- William Mitchell College of Law (Unknown date)

=== Cultural recognition ===
The Jail Diary of Albie Sachs was dramatized by playwright David Edgar for the Royal Shakespeare Company and was televised by the BBC in 1981.

In Allan Hutchinson's 2012 book Laughing at the Gods: Great Judges and How They Made the Common law, Sachs is listed as one of the greatest common law judges in history alongside Lord Mansfield, John Marshall, Oliver Wendell Holmes Jr., James Atkin, Tom Denning, Thurgood Marshall, and Bertha Wilson. Hutchinson believes that Sachs' "life and career redefine what it means to be a lawyer and judge in a society that is grappling with the injustices of its past and ameliorating opportunities of its future."

Abby Ginzberg directed and produced the 2014 documentary Soft Vengeance: Albie Sachs and the New South Africa about Sachs' life, which won a Peabody Award.

The Clooney Foundation for Justice established the Albie Awards to honour activists in different sectors all over the world.

In 2022, Sachs was also featured the Netflix documentary Live to Lead.

== Personal life ==
Sachs married his first wife, Stephanie Kemp, a member of the African Resistance Movement, ANC, and SACP, in 1966. They have two children, Alan and Michael, and divorced in 1980. She remained in London for another 10 years and worked as a physiotherapist specializing in the treatment of children with cerebral palsy before returning to South Africa. Sachs married urban architect Vanessa September in 2006. Their marriage was officiated by Justice Pius Langa. They have one son, Oliver Lukho-u-Thando September Sachs. Sachs describes himself as "a very secular person" who is respectful of others' beliefs and is proud to identify as a Jew. The Jews he identifies most with are Karl Marx, Albert Einstein and Sigmund Freud.

== See also ==
- List of Constitutional Court opinions of Albie Sachs
