= Fraser v ABSA =

South African legal case

- Court: Constitutional Court of South Africa
- Full case name: Trent Gore Fraser v Absa Bank Limited
- Decided: 15 December 2006
- Docket nos.: CCT 66/05
- Citations: [2006] ZACC 24; 2007 (3) SA 484 (CC); 2007 (3) BCLR 219 (CC)

Case history
- Appealed from: ABSA Bank Limited v Fraser and Another [2005] ZASCA 107 in the Supreme Court of Appeal
- Related actions: ABSA Bank Limited v Fraser and Another [2006] ZASCA 31 in the Supreme Court of Appeal

Court membership
- Judges sitting: Langa CJ, Moseneke DCJ, Madala J, O'Regan J, Sachs J, Skweyiya J, van der Westhuizen J and Yacoob J

Case opinions
- Decision by: Van der Westhuizen J (unanimous)

Fraser v ABSA Bank Limited is a decision of the Constitutional Court of South Africa with import for South African criminal procedure. It concerns the interpretation of chapter 5 of the Prevention of Organised Crime Act, 1998, dealing with the restraint and confiscation of property that constitutes the proceeds of crime. It was heard on 23 May 2006 and decided on 15 December 2006 with a unanimous judgment written by Justice Johann van der Westhuizen.

== Background ==
Trent Gore Fraser was arrested in 2003 and charged with racketeering, money laundering and drug-related offences. In November 2004, the High Court of South Africa ordered a provisional restraint order against his property, placing it in the hands of a curator. This order was made in terms of section 26 of the Prevention of Organised Crime Act, 1998 (POCA), which authorised the High Court to issue a restraint order prohibiting a person who has or will be charged with an offence under POCA from dealing in any manner with any property subject to the restraint order.

The High Court also had a discretion in terms of section 26(6) to make provision in the restraint order for the reasonable living and legal expenses of the defendant. Gore applied to the Durban High Court for an order directing the curator to sell the property and use its proceeds for payment of the legal expenses in his criminal trial. Fraser argued that the failure to make such provision violated his right to a fair trial, including the right to legal representation.

ABSA Bank applied to intervene in the proceedings. As a creditor of Fraser, with a four-year-old default judgment against him in its favour, ABSA opposed the application for the provision of legal expenses on the basis that it would be unable to recover its judgment debt were Fraser to succeed.

== Prior actions ==
The High Court confirmed the provisional restraint order, dismissed ABSA's application to intervene, and granted Fraser's application. ABSA applied for and was granted leave to appeal to the Supreme Court of Appeal (SCA).

The SCA reversed the High Court's decision. It granted ABSA's application to intervene and dismissed Fraser's application for provision for legal expenses. Writing for the unanimous bench, Judge of Appeal Dunstan Mlambo held that the legislature could not have intended that a concurrent creditor, who had pursued a claim and obtained a default judgment prior to the issuance of a restraint order, would be prevented from satisfying that judgment simply because the debtor's assets had been restrained. As a consequence of the SCA's decision, ABSA's claim against Fraser was secured. Fraser applied for leave to appeal to the Constitutional Court against the judgment and order of the SCA.

== Constitutional Court ==
=== Jurisdiction ===
Under section 167(3) of the Constitution, the Constitutional Court's jurisdiction was limited to constitutional matters and issues connected with decisions on constitutional matters. In matters other than constitutional matters, the SCA was the highest court in the land. This arrangement was overturned by the Seventeenth Amendment but prevailed at the time of the dispute, and the Constitutional Court's jurisdiction was therefore an open question.

Writing for a unanimous bench, Justice Johann van der Westhuizen held that it was "neither necessary nor desirable" to:

attempt to define the limits of the term 'constitutional matter' rigidly... Philosophically and conceptually, it is difficult to conceive of any legal issue that is not a constitutional matter within a system of constitutional supremacy. All law is after all subject to the Constitution and law inconsistent with the Constitution is invalid.

Nevertheless, van der Westhuizen continued, section 167(3)(b) of the Constitution presupposed that a meaningful line must be drawn between constitutional and non-constitutional matters, and it was the court's responsibility to delineate that line. In this regard, a contention that a lower court reached an incorrect decision "is not, without more, a constitutional matter". Moreover, the Constitutional Court would not assume jurisdiction over a non-constitutional matter "only because an application for leave to appeal is couched in constitutional terms". It was incumbent upon the applicant to demonstrate the existence of "a bona fide constitutional question". As van der Westhuizen cautioned, "An issue does not become a constitutional matter merely because an applicant calls it one."

Although the applicant had not challenged the constitutional validity of any of the provisions of POCA itself or of the restraint order, he claimed that the SCA's interpretation of POCA was constitutionally problematic. Section 39(2) of the Constitution, van der Westhuizen held, "requires more from a Court than to avoid an interpretation that conflicts with the Bill of Rights. It demands the promotion of the spirit, purport and objects of the Bill of Rights." The applicant contended that the SCA had failed to promote the spirit, purport and objects of the Bill of Rights, particularly the right to a fair trial. This, van der Westhuizen found, was a constitutional matter, which meant that the Constitutional Court had jurisdiction to hear it.

=== Leave to appeal ===
Section 167(6) of the Constitution provides for appeals from another court to the Constitutional Court "when it is in the interests of justice and with leave of the Constitutional Court." The Constitutional Court determines whether it is in the interests of justice to grant leave to appeal "through a careful and balanced weighing up of a number of factors." The court held that leave to appeal to it in the present matter should be granted, because the constitutional matter raised was of considerable importance and complexity and because "it cannot be said that there are no prospects of success."

=== Merits ===
The court upheld the SCA's decision to allow ABSA to intervene in the proceedings, but held that the SCA had erred in ruling that ABSA's claim against the applicant was secured against the provision for his reasonable legal expenses. A decision to allow a creditor to intervene does not automatically result in an order to "ring-fence" its claim against competing claims, including the defendant's claim for reasonable legal expenses.

The court's interpretation of POCA was informed by the constitutional protections for fair-trial rights. When a defendant applied in terms of section 26(6) for provision for reasonable legal expenses in a restraint order, the High Court had the discretion to provide for legal expenses. It also had the discretion to permit any creditor who applied to intervene to join the proceedings, and to then grant an order which was fair under all the prevailing circumstances. In doing so the Court had to take into account an accused person's right to legal representation, as well as the interest of the state in preserving the property and the interests of creditors.

Under the circumstances of this case, the court held that it would be fair as well as practical to refer the matter back to the High Court to exercise its discretion in terms of section 26(6) of POCA.

== See also ==
- South African constitutional litigation
