= Port Elizabeth Municipality v Various Occupiers =

South African legal case

Port Elizabeth Municipality v Various Occupiers [2004] ZACC 7 decided by the Constitutional Court in 2004, is an important case in South African law, with significance especially for post-apartheid property rights and constitutional supremacy.

== Facts ==
The case concerned the fate of a small group of people who had been unlawfully occupying some vacant, unused and private land in the jurisdiction of the municipality of Port Elizabeth. At the instance of the landowners and a large number of concerned locals, the municipality applied for their eviction.

It fell to the court to decide whether the eviction could go ahead under the circumstances.

== Judgment ==
The Constitutional Court found that the eviction could not go ahead. Sachs J made reference to the judiciary's "new task," which was to manage "the counterpositioning of conventional rights of ownership against the new, equally relevant, right not to be arbitrarily deprived of a home, without creating hierarchies of privilege." The statute relied upon by the municipality, the Prevention of Illegal Eviction from and Unlawful Occupation of Land Act (PIE), was found to require the courts to "infuse elements of grace and compassion into the formal structures of the law," and confirmed with the Constitution that "we are not islands unto ourselves," and that the courts are "called upon to balance competing interests in a principled way and promote the constitutional vision of a caring society based on good neighbourliness and shared concern." The Bill of Rights in particular is "nothing if not a structured, institutionalised and operational declaration in our evolving new society of the need for human interdependence, respect and concern."

== Significance ==
The court's reasoning "represents a profound commentary on the way in which property law is to be understood in light of the Constitution."

== See also ==
- Property law
- South African property law
