= Universal Declaration on the Human Genome and Human Rights =

UNESCO document outlining ethics of research into the human genome

The Universal Declaration on the Human Genome and Human Rights is a document that was issued by the United Nations Educational, Scientific and Cultural Organization (UNESCO) at its 29th session in 1997. It was unanimously passed by the seventy-seven national delegations in attendance.

The declaration is perhaps best known for its statement against human cloning and abuse of human genome against human dignity.

The first article of the Declaration states that "The human genome underlies the fundamental unity of all members of the human family, as well as the recognition of their inherent dignity and diversity. In a symbolic sense, it is the heritage of humanity", article 2 that "Everyone has a right to respect for their dignity and their rights regardless of their genetic characteristics" and article 10 that "No research or research application concerning the human genome, in particular in the fields of biology, genetics and medicine, should prevail over respect for the human rights, fundamental freedoms and human dignity of individuals or, where applicable, of groups of people". Its article 11 begins with the statement,"Practices which are contrary to human dignity, such as reproductive cloning of human beings, shall not be permitted."

== See also ==
- Common heritage of mankind
