= Johann van der Westhuizen =

South African judge (born 1952)

Inspecting Judge of the Judicial Inspectorate for Correctional Services
- In office 1 April 2016 – 31 December 2019
- Appointed by: Jacob Zuma
- Preceded by: Thembile Skweyiya
- Succeeded by: Edwin Cameron

Justice of the Constitutional Court
- In office 1 February 2004 – 31 January 2016
- Appointed by: Thabo Mbeki
- Succeeded by: Leona Theron

Judge of the High Court
- In office 1 January 1999 – 31 January 2004
- Appointed by: Nelson Mandela
- Division: Transvaal Provincial

Personal details
- Born: Johann Vincent van der Westhuizen; 26 May 1952 (age 74) Windhoek, South West Africa
- Citizenship: South Africa
- Spouse: Sarojini Persaud
- Education: Hoërskool Oos-Moot

Academic background
- Education: University of Pretoria
- Thesis: Noodtoestand as regverdigingsgrond in die strafreg (1979)

Johann Vincent van der Westhuizen (born 26 May 1952) is a South African who served on the Constitutional Court of South Africa from February 2004 to January 2016. He was a professor of law at the University of Pretoria from 1980 to 1999, when he joined the bench as a judge of the High Court of South Africa.

Born to a civil servant stationed in Windhoek, South West Africa, van der Westhuizen attended high school in Pretoria and studied law at the University of Pretoria, where he completed his doctorate in 1980. Thereafter he was a professor at the university's Faculty of Law, serving additionally as the head of the Department of Legal History, Comparative Law and Legal Philosophy from 1980 to 1994 and as the founding director of the influential Centre for Human Rights from 1986 to 1998. During the post-apartheid transition, he was additionally a legal adviser to the bodies that drafted the Interim Constitution and 1996 Constitution.

In January 1999, van der Westhuizen joined the High Court bench as a judge of the Transvaal Provincial Division and an appointee of President Nelson Mandela. He remained in the High Court until February 2004, when President Thabo Mbeki elevated him to the Constitutional Court. After his retirement in January 2016, he served a three-year term as Inspecting Judge of the Judicial Inspectorate for Correctional Services from April 2016 to December 2019.

== Early life and education ==
Van der Westhuizen was born on 26 May 1952 in Windhoek in South West Africa (now Namibia), where he attended the Eros Laerskool. His father, Vincent, was a South African civil servant who, in his spare time, wrote poetry and fiction for popular magazines such as Huisgenoot; in van der Westhuizen's words, he "wrote Apartheid propaganda by day and revolutionary Afrikaans poetry about the red flag of the resistance by night". He described his mother, Anna, as believing that "one must: One, save money; two, obey God; and three, obey the government." However, van der Westhuizen later said that his father inspired his early discomfort with apartheid, which he later found philosophical support for in the writings of philosophers such as John Locke and Immanuel Kant.

The family returned to South Africa during van der Westhuizen's childhood, and he matriculated at the Hoërskool Oos-Moot in Pretoria. He studied law at the University of Pretoria, completing a BA in law cum laude in 1973 and an LLB cum laude in 1975. In 1975, he received the Pretoria Bar Council's Grotius Medal for the best final-year law student. Although he was admitted as an advocate of the Supreme Court of South Africa in 1976, he did not join the bar, instead remaining at his alma mater, where he had lectured in law since his BA graduation in 1973. He continued to serve as a lecturer while studying towards his LLD, which he completed in 1980. His doctoral dissertation, written in Afrikaans, was titled, "Noodtoestand as regverdigingsgrond in die strafreg", on necessity as a defence in criminal law.

== Academic career ==
In 1980, van der Westhuizen was made a professor in the University of Pretoria's Faculty of Law, and he was also appointed as the head of the Department of Legal History, Comparative Law and Legal Philosophy, a position he held until 1994. He was thrice an Alexander von Humboldt Foundation research fellow in Germany in 1982, 1984, and 1990, and he was a fellow of Yale University's Southern Africa Research Program in 1991. In addition, in 1986, he became the founding director of the university's Centre for Human Rights, a position which he retained until he joined the bench.

In parallel with his academic activities, van der Westhuizen joined the Pretoria Bar as an associate member in 1989. In addition to serving as counsel in human rights litigation, he frequently represented film distribution companies in appealing the apartheid government's censorship decisions. He also acted as a consultant and in-house advocate for the Legal Resources Centre and was a member of the board of trustees of Lawyers for Human Rights.

During the negotiations to end apartheid, van der Westhuizen was active in civil society processes to prepare for the post-apartheid transition. He was an adviser to the Multi-Party Negotiating Forum, which adopted the Interim Constitution in 1993, and to the successor Transitional Executive Council; and he subsequently became intimately involved in drafting the final post-apartheid Constitution of 1996, serving as a member both of the Independent Panel of Recognised Constitutional Experts, which advised the Constitutional Assembly, and of the Technical Refinement Team, which oversaw the final drafting and editing process. In 1998, in a joint initiative of the Ministry of Justice and Human Rights Commission, he chaired the committee which drafted the Promotion of Equality Bill, a piece of legislation intended to enact the constitutional right to protection from unfair discrimination; it was ultimately passed as the Promotion of Equality and Prevention of Unfair Discrimination Act, 2000.

== Pretoria High Court: 1999–2004 ==
On 1 January 1999, President Nelson Mandela appointed van der Westhuizen to the bench as a judge of the Transvaal Provincial Division of the High Court of South Africa. He presided in the Pretoria High Court for the next five years. He later said that, during his time there, he "learnt much from the vast experience of the white male judges, appointed before 1994 [the end of apartheid], about the law; court procedure; and farming. I also learnt from a few of them, how people should not be treated and how justice should not be dispensed."

== Constitutional Court: 2004–2016 ==
On 7 January 2004, following consultation with the Judicial Service Commission, President Thabo Mbeki announced that van der Westhuizen would be elevated to the Constitutional Court of South Africa. He joined the apex court on 1 February 2004; he and Thembile Skweyiya filled the vacant seats left by retired justices Laurie Ackermann and Richard Goldstone. The Mail & Guardian characterised van der Westhuizen as a "low profile" member of the court's progressive majority. He wrote judgments in cases across a broad swathe of legal issues, including administrative law, criminal procedure (as in Fraser v ABSA and Magajane v Chairperson, North West Gambling Board), and human rights law.

Van der Westhuizen retired from the judiciary on 29 January 2016 at a special ceremonial session during which he handed down his final opinion, a unanimous judgment in Tronox KZN Sands (Pty) Ltd v KwaZulu-Natal Planning and Development Appeal Tribunal and Others. During the ceremony, he joked that his legacy in the court would be that "I was the first judge to bring The Great Gatsby, President John F. Kennedy, Monty Python, Kris Kristofferson and Bob Dylan into our constitutional jurisprudence. These will henceforth all be authorities to be quoted." In July 2017, after a prolonged delay, President Jacob Zuma appointed Leona Theron to fill van der Westhuizen's seat on the Constitutional Court bench.

== Retirement ==
On 1 April 2016, van der Westhuizen succeeded retired justice Thembile Skweyiya as the Inspecting Judge of the Judicial Inspectorate for Correctional Services. President Cyril Ramaphosa extended his three-year term to 31 December 2019, whereupon he was succeeded as Inspecting Judge by retired justice Edwin Cameron.

In his retirement, van der Westhuizen is an extraordinary professor in the University of Pretoria Faculty of Law and a trustee of the Centre for Human Rights. He also contributes to the Mail & Guardian. In 2021, he was one of six members of Johan Vande Lanotte's Turkey Tribunal, an independent international tribunal on human rights abuses in Recep Tayyip Erdoğan's Turkey.

== Honours ==
On International Human Rights Day in 2013, the University of Pretoria awarded van der Westhuizen an honorary LLD for "his significant contribution to the South African human rights practice and discourse".

== Personal life ==
He is married to Sarojini Persaud, with whom he has three children, one daughter and two sons.

== See also ==
- List of Constitutional Court opinions of Johann van der Westhuizen
