= South African constitutional litigation =

In law, South African constitutional litigation is the area dealing with the rules and principles concerning constitutional matters in the country of South Africa. It includes the jurisdiction of the Constitutional Court of South Africa, the High Court of South Africa, the Supreme Court of Appeal of South Africa, and certain other specialist courts. It also includes the consideration of rules peculiar to these courts that are relevant to constitutional litigation, such as the admission of an amicus curiae, the duty to raise a constitutional matter as early as possible in proceedings, and the duty to join the relevant organ of state in a case involving a constitutional issue.

== Litigating fundamental rights ==
The South African Bill of Rights is "the principal source of substantive constraints on public power in the Constitution." The Bill of Rights instructs the state to use the power that the Constitution of South Africa gives it in ways that do not violate fundamental rights. The state must promote and fulfil those rights. If it fails to do so, it is deemed to have acted unconstitutionally; its actions or laws will be unlawful and invalid. Although the Constitution is mainly concerned with state power and law, a number of provisions of the Bill of Rights place duties on private individuals in certain circumstances.

A fundamental principle of South African law is expressed by the maxim ubi ius ubi remedium (transl. where there is a right, there is a remedy). In other words, the existence of a legal rule implies the existence of an authority with the power to grant a remedy if that rule is infringed. As such, a legal rule is deficient if there is no means of enforcing it and if no sanction attaches to a breach of that rule. Breaches of the Bill of Rights may be remedied by litigation that seeks to directly enforce the principles of set out in the document.

Direct Bill of Rights litigation takes place in several stages. There is an initial procedural stage, followed by several stages dealing with issues of substance. At each distinct stage of the litigation, the court must consider whether the burden of proof is on the applicant or respondent.

=== Summary ===
The stages through which Bill-of-Rights litigation typically proceeds may be summarized as follows:

==== Procedural stage ====
- Does the Bill of Rights apply in the dispute between the parties?
- How does the Bill of Rights apply in the dispute?

As for the first question, it must be determined whether the applicant is entitled to claim the benefits of the Bill of Rights. It must also be determined whether the Bill of Rights applies to the conduct of the respondent, in the sense that the respondent has obligations under the Bill of Rights. Finally, it must be determined whether the cause of action arose in the national territory during the period of application of either the interim or 1996 Bill of Rights.

As for the second question, indirect application must be considered before direct application. If the Bill of Rights is indirectly applied to the issue, the questions of justiciability, jurisdiction and an appropriate remedy are resolved in terms of ordinary legal rules. If directly applied, special constitutional rules apply.

- Is the issue to be decided justiciable?
- Does the applicant in the matter have standing in respect of the particular relief sought?
- Does the court have jurisdiction to grant the relief claimed?

==== Substantive stage ====
If the answer to all three questions is "yes," the court is able to move on to the substantive stage.

- Has the law or conduct of the respondent infringed a fundamental right of the applicant? If so, the court will consider whether the infringement is justifiable. If not, then the application must be dismissed.
- Is the infringement a justifiable limitation of the right in question according to the criteria set out in section 36? If yes, then the conduct of the respondent is not unconstitutional; the application must be dismissed. If no, then the conduct is unconstitutional, and the question of the appropriate remedy must be canvassed.

==== Remedies ====
- What remedy is appropriate in this case?

== Procedural questions in rights litigation ==
Initially, a court hearing a Bill-of-Rights case considers possible procedural issues, including:

- the application of the Bill of Rights to the subject-matter of the litigation;
- the justiciability of the issue to be decided (including the standing of the applicant); and
- the jurisdiction of the court to grant the relief claimed by the applicant.

Often, these procedural aspects of the case will be uncontroversial and the court can proceed directly to the substance of the case.

=== Application and the principle of avoidance ===
Application of the Bill of Rights concerns the issues of whether and how the Bill of Rights applies in a legal dispute. The first of these issues (whether the Bill of Rights applies) raises four questions:

1. Who benefits from the Bill of Rights?
2. Who is bound by the Bill of Rights?
3. Does the Bill of Rights apply to matters arising before its commencement?
4. Does the Bill of Rights apply only in the national territory, or does it have extraterritorial effect?

Answering these questions involves determining the "reach" or "scope" of the Bill of Rights.

Application is concerned not only with whether the Bill of Rights applies, however, but also with how it applies in a legal dispute. The question here is this: What is the relationship between the Bill of Rights and the principles or rules of ordinary law? Currie and de Waal argue that the two application issues should be resolved in the following way:

- The reach of the Bill of Rights (beneficiaries, duties, time and territory) demarcates the types of legal disputes to which the Bill of Rights directly applies. Within this area, the Bill of Rights overrides ordinary law and conduct that is inconsistent with it. In addition, and subject to considerations of justiciability and jurisdiction, the Bill of Rights generates its own set of remedies. This form of application, which is geared towards showing inconsistency between the Bill of Rights and law or conduct, is called the direct application of the Bill of Rights.
- At the same time, the Bill of Rights contains a set of values that must be respected whenever the common law or legislation is interpreted, developed or applied. This form of application, which aims at creating harmony between the Bill of Rights and ordinary law, is called the indirect application of the Bill of Rights. When indirectly applied, the Bill of Rights does not override ordinary law; nor does it generate its own remedies. Instead, law is interpreted or developed in a way that makes it conform to the Constitution. The special constitutional rules relating to the procedural issues of standing and the jurisdiction of the courts are also irrelevant to this form of application. Rather, the Bill of Rights respects the procedural rules, the purpose and remedies of ordinary law, but demands the furtherance of its values through the operation of ordinary law.

Indirect application of the Bill of Rights must be considered before direct application. This is due to the principle of avoidance, which states that constitutional issues should be avoided whenever possible. This principle requires a court first to try to resolve a dispute by applying ordinary legal principles, as interpreted or developed with reference to the Bill of Rights, before applying the Bill of Rights directly to the dispute.

An important implication of the principle of avoidance is that the special rules in the Bill of Rights relating to the standing of litigants and the jurisdiction of the courts apply only when it is impossible to give effect to the values in the Bill of Rights by applying, interpreting or developing the ordinary law. Similarly, constitutional remedies are only relevant when the Bill of Rights is directly applied to an issue. If it is possible to resolve the dispute through indirect application, ordinary procedural rules and remedies apply to the dispute.

However, in order to apply the Bill of Rights indirectly, a court must obviously determine the effect of the provisions of the Bill of Rights. A court cannot interpret or develop the ordinary law with reference to the values contained in the Bill of Rights without knowing what they are. The interpretation of the Bill of Rights and its limitation clause therefore remain important, even when the Bill of Rights is indirectly applied.

=== Justiciability ===
In some cases, an applicant may lack standing to seek a remedy. In other cases, the issue may have become moot or academic and therefore not justiciable. An issue may also be non-justiciable because it is not yet ripe for decision by a court. The Bill of Rights contains special rules relating to these issues when it is directly applied. In such cases, it demands a broader approach to standing. In cases of indirect application, the ordinary legal rules apply.

=== Jurisdiction ===
In cases of indirect application, the ordinary procedural rules apply. The constitutional jurisdiction of the courts and the procedures that must be observed when the Bill of Rights is directly applied to law or conduct are not simply technical issues, but are of paramount importance for the protection of fundamental rights in practice. It is important to know in which forum to challenge an alleged violation of a right, since not all courts have the same jurisdiction in constitutional matters. If the court does not have the jurisdiction to grant the relief claimed, it must dismiss the application, whatever its merits may be.

== Substantive questions in rights litigation ==
At the substantive stage of Bill-of-Rights litigation, the court is concerned with the substance of the applicant's allegation that a right has been infringed by law, or by the conduct of the other party. The court must assess the merits of this allegation. This assessment primarily involves the interpretation of the provisions of the Constitution in general, and the Bill of Rights in particular.

In determining whether or not a right has been unjustifiably infringed, the court undertakes what is "essentially a two-stage exercise": it must determine whether a guaranteed right has been violated by the impugned law or conduct, and, if it has, it must determine whether that violation is justifiable in terms of other constitutional considerations. If the court finds that a violation of a right is not a justifiable limitation, it will have to consider the proper remedy to deal with the unconstitutional infringement of a fundamental right.

The approach of the court to onus in respect of these stages is set out by Ackermann J in the following extract from Ferreira v Levin NO:

The task of determining whether the provisions of [an] Act are invalid because they are inconsistent with the guaranteed rights here under discussion involves two stages, first, an enquiry as to whether there has been an infringement of the [...] guaranteed right; if so, a further enquiry as to whether such infringement is justified under [...] the limitation clause. The task of interpreting the [...] fundamental rights rests, of course, with the Courts, but it is for the applicants to prove the facts upon which they rely for the claim of infringement of the particular right in question. Concerning the second stage, [it] is for the legislature or the party relying on the legislation to establish this justification [in terms of the limitation clause], and not for the party challenging it, to show that it was not justified.

This description focuses on the difference in onus relating to the questions of interpretation and limitation. The applicant has to show that an infringement of a right has taken place. This requires the applicant to prove the facts on which he relies. The respondent then has to show that an infringement is a justifiable limitation of the right in terms of section 36.

=== Interpretation ===
The court must determine whether or not the Bill of Rights protects a particular interest of the applicant. It must then determine whether or not the law that has been challenged or the conduct of the respondent impairs that interest, thereby trespassing in an area protected by the Bill of Rights. In other words, the "threshold enquiry" for a rights-based challenge is

aimed at determining whether or not the enactment in question constitutes a limitation on one or other guaranteed right. This entails examining (a) the content and scope of the relevant protected right(s) and (b) the meaning and effect of the impugned enactment to see whether there is any limitation of (a) by (b). Subsections (1) and (2) of section 39 of the Constitution give guidance as to the interpretation of both the rights and the enactment, essentially requiring them to be interpreted so as to promote the value system of an open and democratic society based on human dignity, equality and freedom. If upon such analysis no limitation is found, that is the end of the matter. The constitutional challenge is dismissed there and then.

=== Limitation ===
If the court determines that a law, or the conduct of the respondent, impairs a fundamental right, a second stage of enquiry ensues: the so-called "limitations exercise". The court must consider whether the infringement is nevertheless a justifiable limitation of the right in question: "In essence this requires a weighing-up of the nature and importance of the right(s) that are limited together with the extent of the limitation as against the importance and purpose of the limiting enactment."

Fundamental rights and freedoms are not absolute: "Their boundaries are set by the rights of others and by the legitimate needs of society. Generally, it is recognized that public order, safety, health and democratic values justify the imposition of restrictions on the exercise of fundamental rights." In the South African Constitution, a general limitation clause, section 36, sets out specific criteria for the restriction of the fundamental rights in the Bill of Rights. The clause is general because it applies in the same way to all the rights in the Bill of Rights. In this regard the Constitution differs from, for example, the United States Constitution, which does not contain a limitations clause at all. The German Bill of Rights does not have a general limitations clause, but it does contain specific limitations clauses attached to most of the fundamental rights.

Not all laws or conduct that infringe fundamental rights are unconstitutional. Sometimes a law may be a justifiable limitation on a particular fundamental right. This means that, although the law or conduct infringes the right, the infringement (which is called a limitation) is justifiable. While infringing conduct itself cannot validly limit a fundamental right, the challenged conduct may be authorized by law. If the law passes the limitations test, the conduct it authorizes will survive a constitutional challenge. The question, ultimately, which falls for determination by this balancing exercise is whether or not a balance can be struck. If not—if, that is, there is no proportionality—the limitation will not be found to be reasonable and justifiable in an open and democratic society.

In the case of the death penalty, for example, the purposes served by such a penalty—at least, the purposes as considered by the Constitutional Court in S v Makwanyane—are deterrence, prevention, and retribution. In serving these purposes, however, the impugned right is obliterated completely; its essential content, according to the Constitutional Court, is negated. There is, in other words, no proportionality between means and end.

One consequence of the inclusion of a general limitation clause in the Bill of Rights is that the process of considering the limitation of fundamental rights must be distinguished from that of interpretation of the rights. If it is argued that conduct or a provision of the law infringes a right in the Bill of Rights, it will first have to be determined whether that right has in fact been infringed, and thereafter whether the infringement is justified. The question of whether an infringement of a right is a legitimate limitation of that right "frequently involves a far more factual enquiry than the question of interpretation." Appropriate evidence must be led to justify the limitation of a right in accordance with the criteria laid down in section 36. A court cannot determine in the abstract whether the limitation of a right is "reasonable" or "justifiable in an open and democratic society based on human dignity, equality and freedom." This determination requires "evidence, such as sociological or statistical data," on the impact that the legislative restriction has on society.

=== Remedies ===
Should a court find that a right has been infringed, and that the infringement does not satisfy the test for a valid limitation of a right, the question of the appropriate remedy for the infringement arises. Constitutional remedies are only available when the Bill of Rights is directly applied. In cases of indirect application, ordinary legal remedies are used to give effect to the fundamental values in the Bill of Rights.

The question of who bears the onus when considering the appropriate relief for unconstitutional legislation or conduct is "more complicated" than is the onus at other stages of litigation. When the Bill of Rights is indirectly applied, an ordinary legal remedy is granted, and the ordinary legal rules apply in respect of the burden of proof. When the Bill of Rights is directly applied, the remedy that flows from a finding of inconsistency between the Bill of Rights, on the one hand, and law or conduct, on the other, is invalidation by the court of the offending law or conduct. A party proposing a variation of this form of relief in terms of section 172(l)(b)(i) or (ii) must justify the request. Since section 172 allows a court to limit or suspend the effects of a declaration of invalidity, the respondent will in most cases be called upon to justify such a request. However, a court may also grant relief in addition to the declaration of invalidity, as in the case of an interdict or constitutional damages. In most cases, the applicant will request such relief, and will therefore bear the burden of persuasion.

== Application of the Bill of Rights ==
The South African Bill of Rights applies directly to a legal dispute when

- a right of a beneficiary of the Bill of Rights has been infringed by
- a person or entity on whom the Bill of Rights has imposed the duty not to infringe the right
- during the period of operation of the Bill of Rights
- in the national territory.

In addition, even if the Bill of Rights does not apply directly to a dispute because one or more of the elements above is not present, it may apply indirectly. This is because all of South African law must be developed, interpreted and applied in a way that conforms to the Bill of Rights.

A conceptual distinction, then, must be made between two forms of application of the Bill of Rights:

1. Indirect application: The Constitution and the Bill of Rights establish an "objective normative value system," a set of values that must be respected when interpreting, developing, or applying the common law or legislation. This form of application is called the "indirect" application of the Bill of Rights. When indirectly applied, the Bill of Rights does not override ordinary law or create its own remedies. Rather, the Bill of Rights respects the rules and remedies of ordinary law, but demands furtherance of its values mediated through the operation of ordinary law.
2. Direct application: In disputes in which the Bill of Rights applies as directly applicable law, it overrides ordinary law and any conduct inconsistent with it. To the extent that ordinary legal remedies are inadequate or do not give proper effect to the fundamental rights, the Bill of Rights creates its own remedies. The methodology for the conduct of direct-rights litigation is applicable.

This distinction was of "decisive significance" under the interim Constitution, but it has "comparatively less significance" under the 1996 Constitution. This is because of changes made to the jurisdictional and application scheme by the 1996 Constitution. Nevertheless, the form of application has important consequences, so the distinction between direct and indirect application "continues to play a role in constitutional litigation."

The application of the Bill of Rights has been "one of the most troublesome issues in South African constitutional law." The principal reason for the difficulty is that, since 1994, South Africa has had two Constitutions that have treated the issue differently. Much of the relevant jurisprudence, particularly relating to the application of the Bill of Rights to the common law, was decided under the interim Constitution and does not always bear precisely on the altered jurisdictional and application schemes of the 1996 Constitution.

=== Interim Constitution ===
The narrowest conception of a bill of rights is that it is a "charter of negative liberties." This means that it is intended to protect individuals against state power by listing rights that cannot be violated by the state, either by means of law or through the conduct of state actors. This is the "vertical" relationship—between individuals and the state. A bill of rights that has solely vertical application will place duties on the state not to violate the rights of individuals. It will not place any similar duties on individuals.

According to the Constitutional Court, in Du Plessis v De Klerk, the Bill of Rights in Chapter 3 of the interim Constitution conformed to this traditional model, in so far as it had no direct application to so-called "horizontal" disputes: that is, to disputes between private litigants governed by the common law. "Constitutional rights under Chapter 3," the court held, "may be invoked against an organ of government but not by one private litigant against another." This was principally because of the absence of the word "judiciary" in section 7, the application section of the interim Constitution, which provided that the Bill of Rights "shall bind all legislative and executive organs of state at all levels of government." The omission meant that the Bill of Rights placed duties to uphold constitutional rights only on the legislative and executive organs of state. Individuals were not directly bound by the Bill of Rights. Nor was the judiciary, which had the task of adjudicating and enforcing the rights and duties of individuals.

However, while the interim Bill of Rights did not apply directly to horizontal cases, it did have indirect application. The Bill of Rights applied to "all law in force," including all pre- and post-1994 legislation and the un-codified common law (provisions of the common law which had not been incorporated into legislation). Even if individuals were not directly bound by the Bill of Rights, the courts had to interpret legislation, and develop the common law, so that the ordinary law recognised and protected the rights in the Bill of Rights. In Du Plessis v Klerk, the Constitutional Court held that the Bill of Rights in the Interim Constitution "may and should have an influence on the development of the common law as it governs relations between individuals." This was provided for in section 35(3) of the interim Constitution: "In the interpretation of any law and the application and development of the common law and customary law, a court shall have due regard to the spirit, purport and objects of" the Bill of Rights. "In private litigation," held the court, "any litigant may nonetheless contend that a statute (or executive act) relied on by the other party is invalid as being inconsistent with the limitations placed on legislature and executive under Chapter 3." Accordingly, "as Chapter 3 applies to common law, governmental acts or omissions in reliance on the common law may be attacked by a private litigant as being inconsistent with Chapter 3 in any dispute with an organ of government."

In Du Plessis, the Constitutional Court also decided a crucial jurisdictional issue. The court's conclusion that the Constitution distinguished between direct and indirect application of the Bill of Rights was bolstered by the close fit between this distinction and the "two-track" jurisdictional scheme of the interim Constitution, which distinguished between "constitutional matters" and other matters, the former being the preserve of the Constitutional Court, and the latter the preserve of the Appellate Division. The development of the common law was a non-constitutional matter, and therefore remained within the jurisdiction of the court that had overseen the development of the common law for the past century: the Appellate Division of the Supreme Court. "The development of the common law," held the court in Du Plessis, "is within the jurisdiction of the Appellate Division, but not of the Constitutional Court."

=== 1996 Constitution ===
With the Du Plessis decision in mind, and concerned that confining the Bill of Rights to direct vertical application amounted to the toleration of private violations of rights, the Constitutional Assembly created a different application and jurisdictional scheme in the 1996 Constitution. To provide for direct horizontal application, two textual changes were made. The first was the addition of the word "judiciary" in section 8(1), missing from the application provisions of the interim Constitution. The second was the imposition of a duty on individuals, in section 8(2), to uphold the rights of other individuals: "A provision of the Bill of Rights binds a natural or a juristic person if, and to the extent that, it is applicable, taking into account the nature of the right and the nature of any duty imposed by the right."

The 1996 Constitution also made significant changes to the powers of the courts to enforce the Constitution. The "two-track" jurisdictional scheme of the interim Constitution was replaced by a unified scheme in which the High Courts, Supreme Court of Appeal and the Constitutional Court shared jurisdiction over constitutional matters. This scheme required revision of the holding in Du Plessis that the application of the Constitution to the common law was a non-constitutional matter. Under the 1996 Constitution, the Constitutional Court held in the Pharmaceutical Manufacturers case, "there are not two systems of law, each dealing with the same subject matter, each having similar requirements, each operating in its own field with its own highest court. There is only one system of law. It is shaped by the Constitution which is the supreme law, and all law, including the common law, derives its force from the Constitution and is subject to constitutional control."

While clearly envisaging direct horizontal application in applicable cases, the 1996 Bill of Rights also requires the courts to apply the Bill of Rights indirectly, in similar terms to section 35(3) of the interim Constitution. This is section 39(2): "When interpreting any legislation, and when developing the common law or customary law, every court, tribunal or forum must promote the spirit, purport and objects of the Bill of Rights."

To summarise, the 1996 Constitution, like its predecessor, distinguishes two forms of application of the Bill of Rights:

1. Direct application entails the imposition of duties by the Bill of Rights on specified actors: A breach of such a duty is a violation of a constitutional right.
2. Indirect application occurs where there is a provision of ordinary law (legislation, common law or customary law) that mediates between the Bill of Rights and the actors who are subject to that law. The duty of the courts is to ensure that the ordinary law conforms to the values to which the Bill of Rights, by conferring the rights and duties that it does, gives effect.

Like its predecessor, the 1996 Constitution provides for direct vertical application of the Bill of Rights but, unlike its predecessor, does not confine itself to this form of direct application. Section 8(2) clearly envisages direct application of the Bill of Rights in the horizontal relationship in certain circumstances.

=== Manner of application in legal disputes ===
Under the 1996 Constitution, there is only one system of law. The Constitution applies to all law, informing its interpretation and development by the courts and determining its validity. This means that the parallel systems of "constitutional" law and "non-constitutional" law (and "constitutional" and "non-constitutional litigation") developed under the interim Constitution are no longer theoretically sustainable. Nevertheless, the distinction between the direct and indirect methods of application of the Constitution to the law has not been abandoned and "continues to have some practical significance at least in so far as the common law is concerned."

=== Jurisdiction ===
We have seen that, under the interim Constitution, the distinction between the direct and indirect application of the Bill of Rights had important jurisdictional implications. The interim Constitution distinguished between constitutional matters and other matters and provided that the Constitutional Court could hear only the former and the Appellate Division only the latter. In Du Plessis, the Constitutional Court held that indirect application of the Bill of Rights to the common law was not a constitutional matter, and therefore was within Appellate Division jurisdiction. The main task of the Constitutional Court was to test the validity of the law and state conduct against the Constitution. In order to trigger the jurisdiction of the Constitutional Court, it was, therefore, necessary to show that the Bill of Rights applied directly to the challenged law or conduct. Whenever the Bill of Rights merely applied indirectly to a dispute, the Appellate Division and not the Constitutional Court was primarily responsible.

Under the unitary jurisdictional system established by the 1996 Constitution, all superior courts have the power to apply the Constitution directly and indirectly to the common law. This means that the jurisdictional motivation for distinguishing between direct and indirect application no longer holds for common-law disputes. However, since decisions of the High Courts and the Supreme Court of Appeal declaring certain forms of legislation invalid must be confirmed by the Constitutional Court, "it remains important for jurisdictional reasons," whether legislation is directly tested against the Bill of Rights, or whether it is merely interpreted with reference to the Bill of Rights.

=== Purpose and effect ===
The purpose of the direct application is to determine whether there is, on a proper interpretation of the law and the Bill of Rights, any inconsistency between the two. The purpose of the indirect application is to determine whether it is possible to avoid, in the first place, any inconsistency between the law and the Bill of Rights by a proper interpretation of the two.

Direct application of the Bill of Rights generates a constitutional remedy, whereas indirect application does not. The reason for this is that direct application is aimed at exposing inconsistency between the Bill of Rights and law or conduct. If there is, the court then declares that law or conduct constitutionally invalid. The effect of such a declaration, according to Ackermann J and Sachs J in Du Plessis, is to restrict the legislature's options in amending the law or enacting a similar law. Much depends of course on the terms of the court's order and its reasoning and the application of the doctrine of stare decisis, but as a general rule direct application rules out certain possibilities as constitutionally impermissible, whereas an indirect application merely proposes the construction of the law that conforms to the Constitution. Although there is, therefore, a difference in principle between direct and indirect application, the problem alluded to by Ackermann J and Sachs J also depends on the extent to which a court is prepared to "pronounce on the meaning" of the Constitution: "Courts generally avoid making extensive pronouncements on what the Constitution demands the common law to be, whether they apply the Bill of Rights directly or indirectly." The preferred approach is to give narrow rulings limited to the facts before the court: "Such orders will preserve considerable space for the legislature to reform the common law." Direct application, however, "inevitably rules out certain options." When a law or conduct is ruled to be inconsistent with the Constitution, it can no longer form part of the law. The scope of the limitation on the legislature's discretion will therefore depend on the extent of the court's ruling.

That said, there is little practical difference between the two forms of application when it comes to the common law. This is because, although notionally methodologically distinct, direct and indirect application of the Bill of Rights end up at the same point: the need to develop rules of the common law in conformity with the Bill of Rights.

"There are," observe Currie and De Waal, "only a few common-law cases where the method of application is likely to make a substantive difference to the result." These are cases in which a plaintiff cannot find a cause of action in the existing common law. Since the common law does not provide a right, it will be necessary to invoke directly a right in the Bill of Rights.

=== Sequencing ===
The principle of avoidance, articulated by the Constitutional Court in Zantsi v Council of State, Ciskei, (Note: Zantsi v Council of State, Ciskei and Others 1995 (4) SA 615 (CC).) holds that courts should not adjudicate constitutional questions that are not decisive for the dispute under consideration. When applying the Bill of Rights in a legal dispute, the principle of avoidance is "of crucial importance." As already stated, the Bill of Rights always applies in a legal dispute. It is usually capable of direct or indirect application and, in a limited number of cases, of indirect application only. The availability of direct application is qualified by the principle that the Bill of Rights should not be applied directly in a legal dispute unless it is necessary to do so. The principle has "a number of important consequences."

Even when the Bill of Rights applies directly, a court must apply the provisions of ordinary law to resolve the dispute, especially in so far as the ordinary law is intended to give effect to the rights contained in the Bill of Rights. Many recent statutes, such as the Labour Relations Act 66 of 1995 and the Equality and Administrative Justice Acts are intended to implement the Bill of Rights. They must first be applied, and if necessary interpreted generously to give effect to the Bill of Rights, before a direct application is considered.

The same applies to disputes governed by the common law. The ordinary principles of common law must first be applied, and if necessary developed with reference to the Bill of Rights, before a direct application is considered.

When the Bill of Rights is directly applied in disputes governed by legislation, conduct must be challenged before law. In other words, the implementation of the statute must be challenged before the provisions of the statute itself.

However, "to complicate matters further," the principle that constitutional issues should be avoided is not an absolute rule. It does not require that litigants may only directly invoke the Constitution as a last resort. As with many legal principles, its force depends on the circumstances of the case. Where the violation of the Constitution is clear and directly relevant to the matter, and there is no apparent alternative form of ordinary relief, it is not necessary to waste time and effort by seeking a non-constitutional way of resolving a dispute. This will often be the case when the constitutionality of a statutory provision is placed in dispute because, apart from a reading down, there are no other remedies available to a litigant affected by the provision. On the other hand, the principle of avoiding constitutional issues is particularly relevant when the interest of an applicant in the resolution of a constitutional issue is not clear, and where the issue is not ripe for decision, or when it has become academic or moot.

== Direct and indirect application ==
=== Standing ===
Legal rights are a correlative relationship. If Armand has a legal right to something, this postulates that Theo has a legal duty to Armand to uphold that right. Armand is therefore the beneficiary of the right and Theo is the duty-bearer in respect of the right. The first application issue to confront when considering the reach of the Bill of Rights is to identify the beneficiaries and the duty-bearers of the rights in the Bill of Rights.

Section 8(4) of the Bill of Rights provides that juristic persons, as well as natural persons, are entitled to certain constitutional rights "to the extent required by the nature of the rights and the nature of that juristic person". Much of the debate about the meaning of the guidelines contained in section 8(4)—that is, "the nature of the right" and "the nature of the juristic person"—is made "irrelevant," write Currie and De Waal, by the courts' approach to standing in constitutional litigation. A person has standing to challenge the constitutionality of laws or conduct,

1. provided that he alleges that a fundamental right is infringed or threatened; and
2. provided that he has, in terms of the categories listed in section 38, a sufficient interest in obtaining a remedy.

The first enquiry is objective: It is sufficient to show that a right in the Bill of Rights is violated by a law or conduct; it is not necessary to show that a right of the applicant has been violated. This approach allows anyone with a sufficient interest to rely on the objective inconsistency between the Bill of Rights and a law or conduct. For example, it will seldom be necessary for juristic persons to invoke section 8(4), which sometimes extends the protection of the right to the juristic person itself. Laws, and many forms of state and private conduct, inevitably impact on the activities of both natural and juristic persons. Provided that a juristic person has a sufficient interest of its own, or, if it is an association, a sufficient interest of its members, it may challenge such laws or conduct on the basis of fundamental rights that do not necessarily benefit the juristic person. For example, a law which prohibits the sale of wine on Sunday may be challenged by a company on the basis of the right to freedom of religion, provided that the company has a sufficient interest in the outcome of the litigation. It is not necessary in such a case for the company to show that the right to freedom of religion benefits juristic persons.

It is only when a law or conduct impacts solely on the activities of juristic persons that it will not be possible to follow this course of action. Then there can be no objective inconsistency between the Bill of Rights and the law or conduct, unless section 8(4) extends protection of the relevant right to juristic persons. For example, when a special tax on companies is challenged, a person challenging the tax will have to do so on the basis of a right that benefits juristic persons.

=== Direct horizontal and vertical application ===
Traditionally, a bill of rights confines itself to regulating the "vertical" relationship between the individual and the state. This is not a relationship of equality. The state is far more powerful than any individual. If not protected by a bill of rights against abuse of the state's powers, the individual would be "in an extremely vulnerable position." The 1996 Bill of Rights performs this traditional task of protecting individuals against the state by imposing a duty on all branches of the state to respect its provisions. The 1996 Bill of Rights goes further than is traditional, however. The Bill of Rights is not confined to protecting individuals against the state. In certain circumstances, the Bill of Rights directly protects individuals against abuses of their rights by other individuals, by providing for the direct horizontal application of the Bill of Rights.

The direct application of the duties under the Bill of Rights is governed by section 8. Broadly speaking, section 8(1) deals with direct vertical application. It describes the circumstances in which law and conduct of the state may be challenged for being inconsistent with the Bill of Rights. Section 8(2), on the other hand, deals with direct horizontal application.

The Bill of Rights also applies indirectly on both the vertical and horizontal axes. Indirect application means that, instead of the Bill of Rights' directly imposing duties and conferring rights, rights and duties are instead imposed by the common law or legislation. In turn, the development and interpretation of the common law and legislation is influenced by the Bill of Rights.

==== Direct vertical application: duties of state actors ====
Section 8(1) provides that the South African legislature, executive, judiciary and other organs of state are bound by the Bill of Rights. An applicant may therefore challenge the conduct of any of these state institutions as a breach of their duties under the Bill of Rights.

===== Legislatures =====
The term "legislature" refers to the institutions that exercise the legislative authority of the Republic: Parliament, the provincial legislatures and the municipal councils. The primary duty of all of these bodies, and their principal form of conduct, is legislating. The output of the legislative process—legislation of the central, provincial and local governments, as well as any form of delegated legislation—must comply with the Bill of Rights. This is because, in the words of section 8(1), the Bill of Rights "applies to all law."

As far as conduct of the legislatures other than law-making is concerned, the implication of section 8(1) is that legislatures and their committees and functionaries are bound by the Bill of Rights when they perform non-legislative functions, such as the determination of internal arrangements, proceedings, rules and procedures. In De Lille v Speaker of the National Assembly, the High Court stated:

The National Assembly is subject to the supremacy of the Constitution. It is an organ of state and therefore it is bound by the Bill of Rights. All its decisions and acts are subject to the Constitution and the Bill of Rights. Parliament can no longer claim supreme power subject to limitations imposed by the Constitution. It subject in all respects to the provisions of our Constitution [... T]he nature and exercise of parliamentary privilege must be consonant with the Constitution. The exercise of parliamentary privilege which is clearly a constitutional power is not immune from judicial review. If a parliamentary privilege is exercised in breach of a constitutional provision, redress may be sought by an aggrieved party from law courts whose primary function is to protect rights of individuals.

===== Executive =====
The Bill of Rights binds the "executive [...] and all organs of state." This means that conduct of the executive and organs of state can be tested against any of the provisions of the Bill of Rights, with the exception of section 33, which can only be applied to conduct of the executive and organs of state that amounts to "administrative action." Although the executive and organs of state are primarily responsible for executing the law, it must be kept in mind that the Bill of Rights also binds these actors when they make law. All delegated legislation may therefore be directly tested against the Bill of Rights for this reason, and for the reason that the Bill of Rights applies to "all law."

The "executive" may be taken to refer to the party-political appointees who collectively head the government, whether at the national or provincial level. At the national level of government, for example, the executive consists of the President, the Deputy President, the Ministers and the Deputy Ministers. On this definition, "it is difficult to envisage conduct of the 'executive' that would not also amount to conduct of an 'organ of state' as defined in s 239."

===== Organs of state =====
The phrase "organ of state" is defined in section 239 of the Constitution. In terms of this definition, the conduct of organs of state may be divided into three categories:

1. conduct of any department of state or administration in the national, provincial or local spheres of government;
2. conduct of any other functionary or institution exercising a power or performing a function in terms of the Constitution or a provincial constitution; and
3. conduct of any functionary or institution exercising a public power or performing a public function in terms of any legislation.

A court or a judicial officer is specifically excluded from the definition.

The first category refers to any department of state or administration in the national, provincial or local spheres of government. When read in context, the implication of this provision is that state departments (or the administration) are bound by the Bill of Rights whether they exercise a power in terms of legislation or act in another capacity. State departments will therefore be bound by the Bill of Rights when, for example, they decide whether to enter into contracts.

By providing that the exercise of a power or the performance of a function in terms of the Constitution, or of a provincial constitution, amounts to conduct of an organ of state, section 239 makes it clear that the exercise of constitutional executive powers (previously referred to as "prerogative powers") may be challenged for consistency with the Bill of Rights.

Finally, a functionary or an institution qualifies as an "organ of state" in terms of s 239 when it exercises a public power or performs a public function in terms of legislation. This provision means, first, that the functionary or the institution must derive powers from a statute or perform a function in terms of a statute (as opposed to merely being incorporated pursuant to a statute, such as all companies and close corporations are). Secondly, it means that the nature of the power or function (and not the nature of the functionary or institution) must be "public." The phrase "public power" is used in section 239 of the Constitution, but it is not defined there. It has gained wide currency in the constitutional jurisprudence, but definition or theorisation of the concept are seldom ventured, "because of its difficulty and abstraction." The concept is best understood as occupying similar terrain to the concept of "public law." Like public law, which operates in distinction to private law, public power operates "in necessary but sometimes fuzzy distinction to an opposite—private power." Currie and De Waal propose the following understanding of public power:

Public power is power with a state-like dimension—either because it derives from the state or because it does what the state typically does—exercise power in a general and public-regarding way. The term therefore connotes use of the state's lawfully derived powers of regulation and compulsion. It is to be distinguished from exercises of what can be called private power—the domain of voluntary obligations.

===== Judiciary =====
When the members of the judiciary (judges and magistrates) act in a judicial capacity—that is to say, when they adjudicate legal disputes—they are required to conduct themselves in a manner that complies with the Bill of Rights. Some provisions of the Bill of Rights, such as section 35(5), which provides for the exclusion of evidence in certain circumstances, are indeed specifically directed at the conduct of the judiciary when presiding over criminal trials. When members of the judiciary perform administrative actions, they are also bound to comply with the administrative-justice right in section 33.

The difficult issue is to determine the extent to which the judiciary is bound when it makes law. Every court decision may be considered to become part of the common law and add to the common law (unless and until it is overturned by a higher court or the legislature). If this is so, "it can be argued that no court may give legal effect to private conduct that is inconsistent with the Bill of Rights." This means that, for practical purposes, private persons will then always be bound to the Bill of Rights, because they will be unable to seek the assistance of the courts to enforce their unconstitutional conduct.

However, this argument has been rejected by the Constitutional Court, on the basis that it would make section 8(2) and (3) redundant. The 1996 Constitution specifically provides that private individuals are directly bound by the Bill of Rights in some instances, not in every instance. This means, in effect, that common-law rules and principles may only be directly tested against the Bill of Rights in so far as they are relied upon by actors who are directly bound by the Bill of Rights. Whenever such an actor, private or state, is bound, the Bill of Rights becomes directly applicable law which overrides the common law in so far as it is inconsistent with the Bill of Rights. In disputes between private parties regulated by common law, the extent to which the Bill of Rights applies to private conduct therefore determines its reach or direct application to the common law.

==== Direct horizontal application: duties of private actors ====
Like its predecessor, the 1996 Constitution provides for direct vertical application of the Bill of Rights but, unlike its predecessor, is not confined to this form of direct application. Section 8(2) clearly envisages direct application of the Bill of Rights in the horizontal relationship in certain circumstances, and therefore "points unequivocally toward a much broader conception of direct application." The 1996 Constitution also still permits, however, in section 39(2) (as the Interim Constitution did in section 35(3)), indirect application of the Bill of Rights in horizontal cases. The presence of section 39(2), as Kentridge AJ stated, "prophetically," in Du Plessis v De Klerk, "makes much of the vertical-horizontal debate irrelevant." Since Du Plessis, the courts have routinely approached the issue of the effect of the Bill of Rights on the common law indirectly. The invitation of section 8(2)—to apply rights directly in horizontal situations—was "snubbed."

For a while, therefore, direct horizontality, "this deliberate innovation in the Constitution," threatened "to become a dead letter." As Iain Currie and Johan de Waal observe, "Certainly, one attraction of indirect application was that courts did not have to confront the opacity and apparent circularity of s 8 (the Bill of Rights was to be applied to private actors 'where applicable')." Whatever the reasons, indirect horizontality provided the default form of application by which the courts approached the common law. The trouble with this was that, besides rendering section 8(2) of the Constitution "irrelevant," the "model of indirect application or, if you will indirect horizontality," as Kentridge AJ pointed out in Du Plessis, "seems peculiarly appropriate to a judicial system which, as in Germany, separates constitutional jurisdiction from ordinary jurisdiction." But, under the 1996 Constitution, and in a deliberate alteration of the position under the interim Constitution, South Africa no longer separates constitutional jurisdiction from ordinary jurisdiction. Moreover, indirect application suggests that there is a body of common law that is "conceptually separate from the Constitution, exercising a mediating influence between the actors to whom it applies and the Constitution. This," write Currie and De Waal, "is difficult to accommodate" in the remodelled constitutional system in which there is "only one system of law."

The question of direct application was definitively settled by O'Regan J in Khumalo v Holomisa, "an extremely significant decision," where she held that "the right to freedom of expression is of direct horizontal application" to the law of defamation. By implication and in principle, that holding extends to other areas of private law. This case, the Constitutional Court's first use of the direct-horizontality provisions of the 1996 Constitution,

might be read as bringing to end the long reign of indirect application of the Bill of Rights to the common law. It holds (although admittedly not in so many words) that the Bill of Rights must be applied directly to the common law wherever appropriate. It should be directly applied, in other words, in many (perhaps most) of the horizontal cases that have previously been treated as indirect application cases (ie, cases involving private litigants relying on common-law provisions).

Khumalo, writes Stu Woolman, "committed the Constitutional Court to the proposition that common-law rules—whether challenged in disputes between the state and private parties or in disputes between private parties—were subject to the direct application of the Bill of Rights."

However, despite Khumalo, indirect horizontal application "has proven to be extremely robust and remains the preferred judicial method for dealing with rights claims in the horizontal dimension."

In its only other encounter with direct horizontality, in Barkhuizen v Napier, the Constitutional Court declined to apply the Bill of Rights directly to a challenge to a time-limitation clause in an insurance contract. An insurance company had rejected an insurance claim on the grounds that, at the time of the accident, the vehicle was being used for business purposes, despite its being insured for private use only. Two years after the rejection of the claim, the insured issued summons against the insurance company for the insured amount. The summons was met with a special plea that a term of the insurance policy required any summons to be served within ninety days of the rejection of the claim. In his replication, the insured argued that the term requiring him to issue a summons within ninety days was a breach of section 34 of the Constitution.

This gave the Constitutional Court the opportunity to consider what it termed the "proper approach" to the determination of constitutional validity of contractual clauses concluded between private parties. The High Court had considered the matter as an instance of direct application of section 34 to the contract, and had held that the impugned term of the contract was in conflict with the right. The clause, it held, was a law of general application, because it was underpinned by the principle of pacta sunt servanda. This analysis permitted the High Court to consider whether the limitation of section 34 by the contract was a justifiable limitation of the right. It was held not to be; the clause was declared invalid.

The Constitutional Court expressed "grave doubt" about this approach, which entailed "testing the validity of a contractual term directly against a provision in the Bill of Rights." Instead, the approach ordinarily to be adopted entailed indirect application via the principle that contracts that are contrary to public policy are unenforceable. This principle must be understood to be "deeply rooted in our Constitution and the values that underlie it." This meant that

what public policy is and whether a term in a contract is contrary to public policy is now to be determined by reference to the values that underlie our constitutional democracy as given expression by the provisions of the Bill of Rights. Thus a term in a contract that is inimical to the values enshrined in our Constitution is contrary to public policy and therefore unenforceable [...]. This approach leaves space for the doctrine of pacta sunt servanda to operate, but at the same time allows courts to decline to enforce contractual terms that are in conflict with the constitutional values even though the parties may have consented to them.

The view of Currie and De Waal is that Barkhuizen "largely renders s 8(2) nugatory." The Constitution applies to all law and, in the case of the common law ("the courts' own law"), the default approach of the courts is to assess its constitutionality and to develop it where necessary by way of the indirect application methodology set out below. "The only remaining reason" to deploy direct horizontal application would be to take advantage of the holding of the Supreme Court of Appeal in Afrox Healthcare v Strydom, to the effect that courts in direct-application cases are not bound by pre-1994 decisions. See also in this regard Barkhuizen v Napier (especially its consideration of pacta sunt servanda) and Fraser v ABSA.

=== Indirect application ===
Section 39(2) of the Constitution provides that, "When interpreting any legislation, and when developing the common law or customary law, every court, tribunal or forum must promote the spirit, purport and objects of the Bill of Rights." This gives rise to the so-called indirect application of the Bill of Rights, in which the Bill of Rights is not used to ascertain the constitutionality of some impugned conduct or law, but instead is used to interpret and develop the statutory law and common law that is applicable to the dispute. In the indirect approach, the influence of the Bill of Rights is therefore mediated through those other laws. Because of the principle of avoidance, a court will generally apply the Bill of Rights "indirectly" before, if necessary, applying it "directly", so that, where possible, legal disputes will be decided in terms of existing principles and rules (though properly interpreted or developed with reference to constitutional values).

==== Indirect application to legislation ====
Section 39(2) has far-reaching implications for statutory interpretation. Per Investigating Directorate: Serious Economic Offences v Hyundai Motors, "all statutes must be interpreted through the prism of the Bill of Rights", including the fundamental constitutional values in section 1, in the "spirit of transition and transformation [that] characterises the constitutional enterprise as a whole". (Note: Investigating Directorate: Serious Economic Offences and Others v Hyundai Motor Distributors (Pty) Ltd and Others In re: Hyundai Motor Distributors (Pty) Ltd and Others v Smit NO and Others 2001 (1) SA 545 (CC).) One consequence of this approach is that, in any case where more than one interpretation of a statutory provision is possible, the court must prefer the interpretation that "best" promotes the Bill of Rights. (Note: Wary Holdings (Pty) Ltd v Stalwo 2009 (1) SA 337 (CC) .) Disputes over the constitutionality of legislation may therefore be resolved if the state can establish that a constitutionally compliant reading of the statute is available.

==== Indirect application to common law ====
When it comes to the common law, the principle supports the courts' routine practice of developing the common law in conformity with the Bill of Rights (indirect application) in preference to assessing whether the common law is in conflict with the Bill of Rights (direct application). As already stated, legislation is approached by first interpreting it with the Constitution in mind, prior to any direct application of the Constitution (and any finding of unconstitutionality). In the case of the common law, the approach is similar but not identical, the difference lies in the remedial powers of the courts. If impugned legislation is found to limit a right, and if the limitation does not satisfy the justification standard in section 36, the court provides a remedy by declaring the legislation unconstitutional and, where possible, ameliorating the constitutional defect through reading in or notional or actual severance. "In that event," according to Moseneke J in S v Thebus, "the responsibility and power to address the consequences of the declaration of invalidity resides, not with the courts, but pre-eminently with the legislative authority." The Constitutional Court was unanimous on this issue.

== Temporal application ==
=== The constitution that applies ===
An unconstitutional law becomes invalid the moment the Constitution comes into effect. This is the effect of the supremacy clause of the Constitution: All law and conduct inconsistent with the Constitution is invalidated by it. When making an order of invalidity, a court simply declares invalid what has already been made invalid by the Constitution. This means that an unconstitutional law in force at the time of commencement of the interim Constitution is invalidated by the interim Constitution with effect from 27 April 1994: "If the law is challenged in litigation brought during the period of operation of the 1996 Constitution, the invalidity of the law should be assessed in terms of the interim Constitution."

The doctrine described above is known as "objective constitutional invalidity." It means that an applicant will always have a choice between the interim and 1996 Constitutions when challenging old-order (pre-1994) laws. In other words, "nothing prevents an applicant whose cause of action arose after the commencement of the 1996 Constitution came into force from arguing that an old-order law was invalidated by the interim Constitution." For example, in Prince v President, Cape Law Society, the Constitutional Court held, in litigation brought under the 1996 Constitution, that the requirement in the Supreme Court Act that eleven judges of appeal sit in cases in which the validity of an Act of Parliament was in question was inconsistent with the interim Constitution. According to the Constitutional Court, the quorum requirement in the Supreme Court Act was in conflict with the interim Constitution, which expressly provided that the Appellate Division lacked jurisdiction to enquire into the constitutional validity of legislation. To the extent that the Supreme Court Act provided that the Appellate Division had jurisdiction to adjudicate the constitutionality of Acts of Parliament, it was invalid. Moreover, it had been invalid since the moment of commencement of the interim Constitution on 27 April 1994.

"Clearly," write Currie and De Waal, "there is no difficulty with the application of the rule in Prince if the interim Constitution and 1996 Constitution contain substantively identical provisions." If law in force at the time of commencement of the interim Constitution violates that Constitution, it is invalid with effect from April 27, 1994, and will remain an invalid violation of the 1996 Constitution, notwithstanding the repeal of the interim Constitution by its successor. Prince, however, confronts the situation of a law invalidated by a provision of the interim Constitution that has no equivalent in its successor. The 1996 Constitution granted the SCA the constitutional jurisdiction that it had been denied under the interim Constitution, including jurisdiction to adjudicate on the constitutional validity of Acts of Parliament. This mean that section 12(1)(b) was resuscitated, as the Constitutional Court stated:

Once section 12(1)(b) became invalid because of its inconsistency with the interim Constitution, it could not be validated simply by the fact that under the Constitution the SCA now has constitutional jurisdiction. Section 168(2) of the Constitution which stipulates that the quorum of the SCA shall be determined by an Act of Parliament must therefore, in the absence of the proviso in section 12(l)(b), refer, at present, to section 12(1) of the Supreme Court Act which determines that the ordinary quorum of that Court shall be five judges. This result is consistent with the new constitutional order. Section 12(l)(b) of the Supreme Court Act was enacted at a time when the SCA was the highest court of appeal. That is no longer the case. Its decisions on the constitutionality of an Act of Parliament or conduct of the President have no force or effect unless confirmed by this Court. Its powers in this regard are therefore no different from those conferred upon the High Court.

Currie and De Waal criticize this explanation as "evasive" and "far from clear." Despite this, "it is probably safe to say that, as a general rule, a law invalidated by the interim Constitution remains invalid after its repeal, notwithstanding any substantive difference that there might be in the provisions of the two Constitutions." This, they argue, is "the logical implication" of item 2 of Schedule 6 of the 1996 Constitution: "All law that was in force when the new Constitution took effect, continues in force." Repeal of the interim Constitution does not deprive it of the legal effect that it had while it was in force. One effect was the automatic invalidation of all inconsistent law. Such law is therefore not in force at the time of the transition to the 1996 Constitution and cannot be resuscitated by it.

"Where the interim Constitution is more protective than the final," observes Currie and De Waal, "the implications of Prince may be significant." For example, an applicant may choose to attack an old-order law for inconsistency with the right to freedom of economic activity, rather than relying on the narrower right to professional freedom.

"Logically speaking," the doctrine of objective invalidity means that in the case of old-order legislation, invalidity must first be assessed in terms of the interim Constitution, notwithstanding that the cause of action may have arisen during the operation of the 1996 Constitution. "This, however, does not happen in practice." In Ex parte Women's Legal Centre: In re Moise v Greater Germiston Transitional Local Council (Moise II), the court dealt with an application to amend the order that it had made earlier, in Moise v Greater Germiston Transitional Local Council (Moise I). In Moise I, the court had confirmed the declaration of invalidity by a High Court of section 2(1)(a) of the Limitation of Legal Proceedings (Provincial and Local Authorities) Act. The point made by the applicants in Moise II was that the Limitation Act was pre-constitutional legislation. It was found by the High Court to be a violation of the right of access to court in s 34 of the 1996 Constitution. Section 22 of the Interim Constitution also contained a right of access to court in all relevant respects identical to the one in s 34: "One would therefore have expected, in the light of the Prince decision, that the subsection had become invalid at the moment of commencement of the interim Constitution."

The Constitutional Court dismissed the application for an amendment on the basis that the consistency of the Limitation Act with the interim Constitution had not been raised or canvassed in the High Court: "Arguably, and if properly raised, a court should consider whether a law should be declared [invalid] with reference to the interim Constitution if it survives a challenge under the 1996 Constitution."

The rules and principles stated above apply to the Bill of Rights and not to the other provisions of the Constitution.

=== Non-retrospectivity rule ===
Neither the interim nor the 1996 Constitution is retrospective in its operation. A law is a retrospective if it states that, at a past date, the law shall be taken to have been that which it was not, so as to invalidate what was previously valid or vice versa. Neither the interim nor the 1996 Constitution reaches backward so as to invalidate actions taken under laws valid at the time, even if those laws were contrary to fundamental rights. The corollary also holds: The Constitution cannot retrospectively validate actions that were unlawful in terms of pre-1994 law. Also, the Constitution does not interfere with rights that vested before it came into force.

The rule that the Constitution does not apply retrospectively affects challenges to violations of human rights that occurred before the commencement of the Constitution. Put another way, the rule means that a litigant can only seek constitutional relief for a violation of human rights by conduct that occurred after commencement. As already stated, the implication of the doctrine of objective constitutional invalidity is that on the date of the Constitution's commencement, laws that are inconsistent with the Constitution cease to have legal effect. But this does not mean that acts performed and things done under such (unconstitutional) laws before the Constitution came into force are also invalid. Since the Constitution does not operate retrospectively, they remain valid. An applicant who complains about such actions will not be allowed to challenge the constitutionality of the enabling laws. The constitutional validity of the enabling law becomes irrelevant since the conduct authorized by the law remains valid.

The rule of non-retrospectivity only limits the "reach" of the Bill of Rights. In other words, it covers only the direct application of the Bill of Rights; it does not prevent the courts from applying the Bill of Rights indirectly to the law when developing the common law or interpreting a statute, even if the dispute arose before the commencement of the Constitution. This is because the post-constitutional development of the common law, or reading down of statutes with reference to the Constitution, does not result in the Constitution's working retroactively. "It is sometimes said," the court noted in Du Plessis v De Klerk, "that 'judge-made law' is retrospective in its operation." Currie and De Waal contend that it is "always" so. It must be added, however, that the Constitutional Court has not explicitly decided that the rule of non-retrospectivity does not hold for the indirect application of the Bill of Rights.

In Du Plessis v De Kierk, the Constitutional Court expressly "left open" the question of whether a litigant could rely on section 35(3) of the interim Constitution in respect of a common-law claim which arose prior to the date on which the interim Constitution came into force. Kentridge AJ nevertheless remarked that "it may be that a purely prospective operation of a change in the common law will be found to be appropriate when it results from the application of a constitutional enactment which does not itself have retrospective operation."

However, in Gardener v Whitaker, Kentridge AJ "seemed to condone the indirect application of the Bill of Rights to the law of defamation" in relation to alleged defamation that took place before the commencement of the interim Constitution.'04 Similarly, in Key v Attorney-General a search and seizure of documents had been completed before the interim Constitution came into force. This meant that the statutory provisions authorizing the search and seizure could not be attacked as violations of the Constitution. Kriegler J nevertheless stated that if the evidence obtained by way of the search and seizure was tendered in criminal proceedings against the applicant, he would be entitled to raise Constitution-based objections to its admissibility. While the non-retrospectivity rule prevented the applicant in Key from challenging the provisions of the Investigation of Serious Economic Offences Act before or during the trial, a discretion to exclude otherwise admissible evidence could be developed by indirectly applying the Bill of Rights.

In Masiya v Director of Public Prosecutions, the Constitutional Court accepted that retrospective consequences would ordinarily follow from the development of the common law in terms of section 39(2) of the Constitution. However, it held that, on the exceptional facts at issue—the development of the common-law definition of rape to include anal rape of a woman—the retrospective development would offend the principle of legality. Legality, noted the court, included the principle of foreseeability. The rules of criminal law had to be clear so that individuals know which conduct is proscribed by law. The definition was accordingly held to apply only to conduct taking place after the judgment.

=== Application to matters pending at the date of commencement ===
Court proceedings that commenced prior to the coming into effect of the interim or 1996 Constitutions, but which had not yet been finalized when those Constitutions took effect, are governed by item 17 of Schedule 6, which provides that court proceedings that commenced before the coming into effect of the 1996 Constitution, but after the coming into effect of the interim Constitution, must be decided in terms of the interim Constitution unless the interests of justice require otherwise. Proceedings that commenced before the coming into effect of the interim Constitution must be dealt with in accordance with the law in force at the time, unless the interests of justice require otherwise.

=== Stare decisis ===
"One of the most important" limitations on the power to develop the common law via the indirect application of the Constitution is the doctrine of stare decisis. Govender v Minister of Safety and Security held that section 49(l)(b) of the Criminal Procedure Act was not unconstitutional, but, in a subsequent decision, the Transkei High Court, in S v Walters, confronted with the precedent of the SCA decision in Govender, held that it did not have to follow it. Appeal-court decisions on the constitutional validity of legislation, according to Jafta AJP, "rank in the same level" as High Court decisions. The reason is that both decisions had no force unless confirmed by the Constitutional Court. Since, in the view of Jafta AJP, the SCA's decision on section 49(1)(b) in Govender was clearly wrong, it did not have to be followed by the High Court. The subsection was struck down to the extent that it permitted the use of force to prevent a suspect from fleeing.

The High Court's approach to the issue was repudiated by the Constitutional Court in the confirmation proceedings:

The trial court in the instant matter was bound by the interpretation put on section 49 by the SCA in Govender. The judge was obliged to approach the case before him on the basis that such interpretation was correct, however much he may personally have had his misgivings about it. High courts are obliged to follow legal interpretations of the SCA, whether they relate to constitutional issues or to other issues, and remain so obliged unless and until the SCA itself decides otherwise or [... the Constitutional Court] does so in respect of a constitutional issue.

But this holding, Kriegler J emphasized, applied only to the binding effect of decisions of higher tribunals "delivered after the advent of the constitutional regime and in compliance with the requirements of section 39 of the Constitution." The extent of application of stare decisis to pre-1994 decisions (if this is what "the advent of the constitutional regime" means), and to direct applications of the Constitution, was not decided.

The subsequent decision of the Supreme Court of Appeal in Afrox v Strydom "fills the gap left open by the Constitutional Court." As regards the binding effect of the pre-constitutional authority of the appeal court, there are three distinct situations that can arise:

1. Direct application of the Constitution to the common law: "The High Court is convinced that the relevant rule of the common law is in conflict with a provision of the Constitution." In such situations, pre-Constitutional authority is not binding on a High Court.
2. Pre-constitutional decisions of the appeal court based on open-ended considerations such as boni mores or public interest: In such situations, the High Court may depart from earlier authority if convinced, taking the values of the Constitution into account, that it no longer reflects the boni mores or the public interest.
3. The third situation is that of an indirect application of the Constitution to the common law, by way of section 39(2). Even if convinced that the rule must be developed to promote the spirit, purport, and objects of the Bill of Rights, a High Court is obliged to follow the authority of pre-constitutional decisions of the appeal court.

Currie and De Waal put Afrox and Walters together in the following way:

- Post-constitutional decisions of higher courts are binding, whether they are on constitutional issues or not.
- Pre-1994 decisions of higher courts on the common law are binding, except in cases of direct conflict with the Constitution or in cases involving the development of open-ended standards such as Boni mores.

The distinction between direct and indirect application is, therefore "crucial to the impact of the Afrox decision." Section 39(2), the SCA holds, does not authorise lower courts to depart from higher authority, whether pre-or post-constitutional. The subsection must be read with section 173, recognizing the inherent jurisdiction of the High Courts to develop the common law. It is that power that is exercised when the courts develop the common law in accordance with section 39(2). But the power has always been constrained by the doctrine of stare decisis: "There is nothing to indicate that the Constitution has changed this."

The Afrox and Walters decisions have been strongly criticized. There is, however, "a significant omission from the Afrox decision." The SCA in Afrox "seems to confine itself to the first type of indirect application only" – the development of the common law – neglecting statutory interpretation in line with the spirit of the Bill of Rights. This may be taken to mean that "post-Afrox High Courts still possess the jurisdiction to depart from pre-constitutional statutory interpretations of the AD." Currie and De Waal argue that "a great deal also turns on the distinction between direct and indirect application."

== Territorial application ==
"Though it is obvious," write Currie and De Waal, that the Constitution applies throughout the national territory, "it is less obvious whether it has any extraterritorial application." The question was considered by the Constitutional Court in Kaunda v President of the Republic of South Africa. The case arose from an incident in which the applicants, all South African citizens, had been arrested in Zimbabwe on charges that they had plotted to stage a coup in Equatorial Guinea. The applicants sought relief in the form of an order directing the South African government to seek assurances from the governments of Zimbabwe and Equatorial Guinea that the death penalty would not be imposed on the applicants. The basis of the application was a contention that the applicants' constitutional rights to a fair trial, to dignity, life and freedom and security of the person were being infringed in Zimbabwe, and were likely to be infringed if they were extradited to Equatorial Guinea. The state's duty to protect the rights of the applicants (stemming from section 7(2)) required them to be provided with diplomatic protection.

This argument, Chaskalson CJ held for the majority of the court, required acceptance of the proposition that "the rights nationals have under our Constitution attach to them when they are outside of South Africa, or that the state has an obligation under section 7(2) to 'respect, protect, promote, and fulfill' the rights in the Bill of Rights which extends beyond its borders." According to the court, to the extent that the Constitution provides the framework for the governance of South Africa, it is territorially bound and has no application beyond the borders of the Republic. As for the Bill of Rights, although foreigners are entitled to require the South African state to respect, protect and promote their rights, they lose the benefit of that protection when they leave the national territory. The argument of the applicant, to the effect that section 7(2) places a more extensive obligation on the state to respect, protect and promote the rights of South Africans when they are in foreign countries, was rejected. The bearers of the rights in the Bill of Rights are people in South Africa. The Bill of Rights does not have general application beyond the national territory.

Section 7(1) does not deal withstanding, but rather with the definition of the class of beneficiaries of the rights in the Bill of Rights. It therefore does not bar a foreign litigant who has a protectable interest in this country from seeking to protect that interest before a South African court.

== Bibliography ==
=== Books ===
- Currie, Iain, and De Waal, Johan. The Bill of Rights Handbook. Juta, 2013.
- Currie, Iain, et al. The New Constitutional and Administrative Law: Constitutional law. Vol. 1. Juta, 2010.
- Woolman, Stu, and Michael Bishop. Constitutional conversations. PULP, 2008.

=== Papers and journal articles ===
- Woolman, Stuart Craig (2007). "The Amazing, Vanishing Bill of Rights". South African Law Journal. 124: 762. hdl:2263/5294. ISSN 0258-2503. S2CID 142759137.
- Woolman, S; Brand, D (2003). "Is there a Constitution in this Courtroom? Constitutional Jurisdiction after Afrox and Walters". SA Public Law. 18. hdl:20.500.12144/30751. ISSN 0258-6568.
