= ATAS =

ATAS may refer to:

- Academic Technology Approval Scheme
- Academy of Television Arts & Sciences
- AIM-92 Stinger, a.k.a. Air-to-Air Stinger, a missile
- Association of Top Achiever Scouts

== See also ==
- Al-Attas (disambiguation)
- ATAŞ (Refinery)
