= Doctor of Philosophy =

Postgraduate academic degree

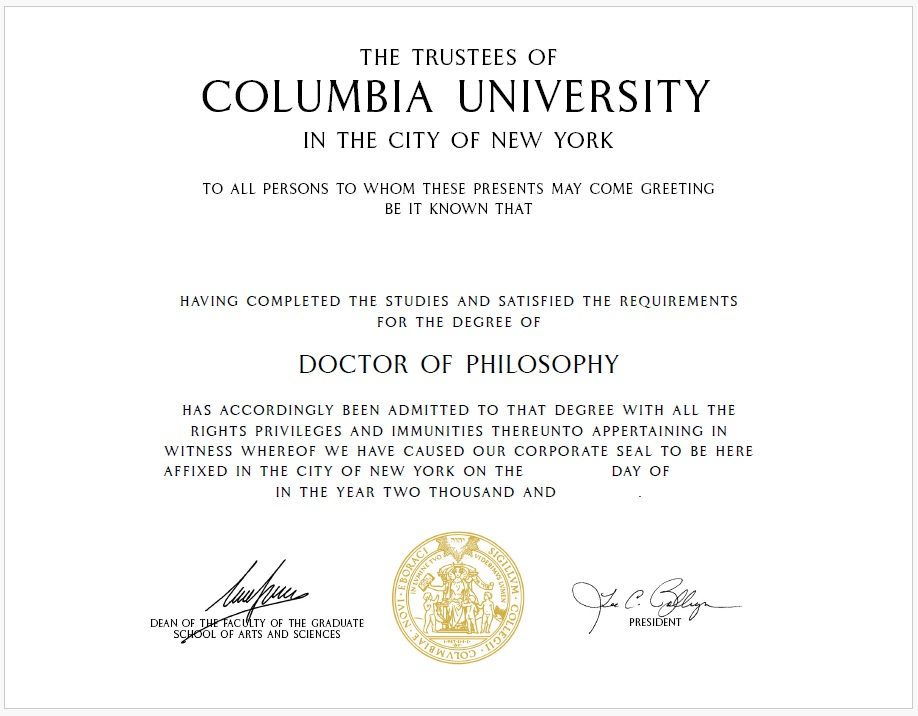
- Doctor of Philosophy degree certificate of Columbia University
- Acronym: PhD
- Type: Postgraduate education
- Duration: 3 to 8 years
- Prerequisites: Bachelor's degree Master's degree (varies by country and institution)

A Doctor of Philosophy (PhD, DPhil; Latin: philosophiae doctor or doctor in philosophia) is a terminal degree that usually denotes the highest level of academic achievement in a given discipline and is awarded following a course of graduate study and original research. The name of the degree is most often abbreviated PhD (or, at times, as Ph.D. in North America) and is pronounced as three separate letters (/ˌpiːeɪtʃˈdiː/ PEE-aych-DEE).

PhDs are awarded for programs across the whole breadth of academic fields. Since it is an earned research degree, those studying for a PhD are required to produce original research that expands the boundaries of knowledge, normally in the form of a dissertation, and, in some cases, defend their work before a panel of other experts in the field. In many fields, the completion of a PhD is typically required for employment as an academic, researcher, or scientist.

== Definition ==
In the context of the Doctor of Philosophy and other similarly titled degrees, the term "philosophy" does not refer to the field or academic discipline of philosophy, but is used in a broader sense in accordance with its original Greek meaning, which is "love of wisdom". In most of Europe, all fields (including history, philosophy, social sciences, mathematics, and natural philosophy – later known as natural science) other than theology, law, and medicine (the so-called professional, vocational, or technical curricula) were traditionally known as philosophy, and in Germany and elsewhere in Europe the basic faculty of liberal arts was known as the "faculty of philosophy".

A PhD candidate must submit a project, thesis, or dissertation often consisting of a body of original academic research, which is in principle worthy of publication in a peer-reviewed journal. In many countries, a candidate must defend this work before a panel of expert examiners appointed by the university. Universities sometimes award other types of doctorate besides the PhD, such as the Doctor of Musical Arts (DMA) for music performers, Doctor of Juridical Science (SJD) for legal scholars and the Doctor of Education (EdD) for studies in education. In 2005 the European University Association defined the "Salzburg Principles", 10 basic principles for third-cycle degrees (doctorates) within the Bologna Process. These were followed in 2016 by the "Florence Principles", seven basic principles for doctorates in the arts laid out by the European League of Institutes of the Arts, which have been endorsed by the European Association of Conservatoires, the International Association of Film and Television Schools, the International Association of Universities and Colleges of Art, Design and Media, and the Society for Artistic Research.

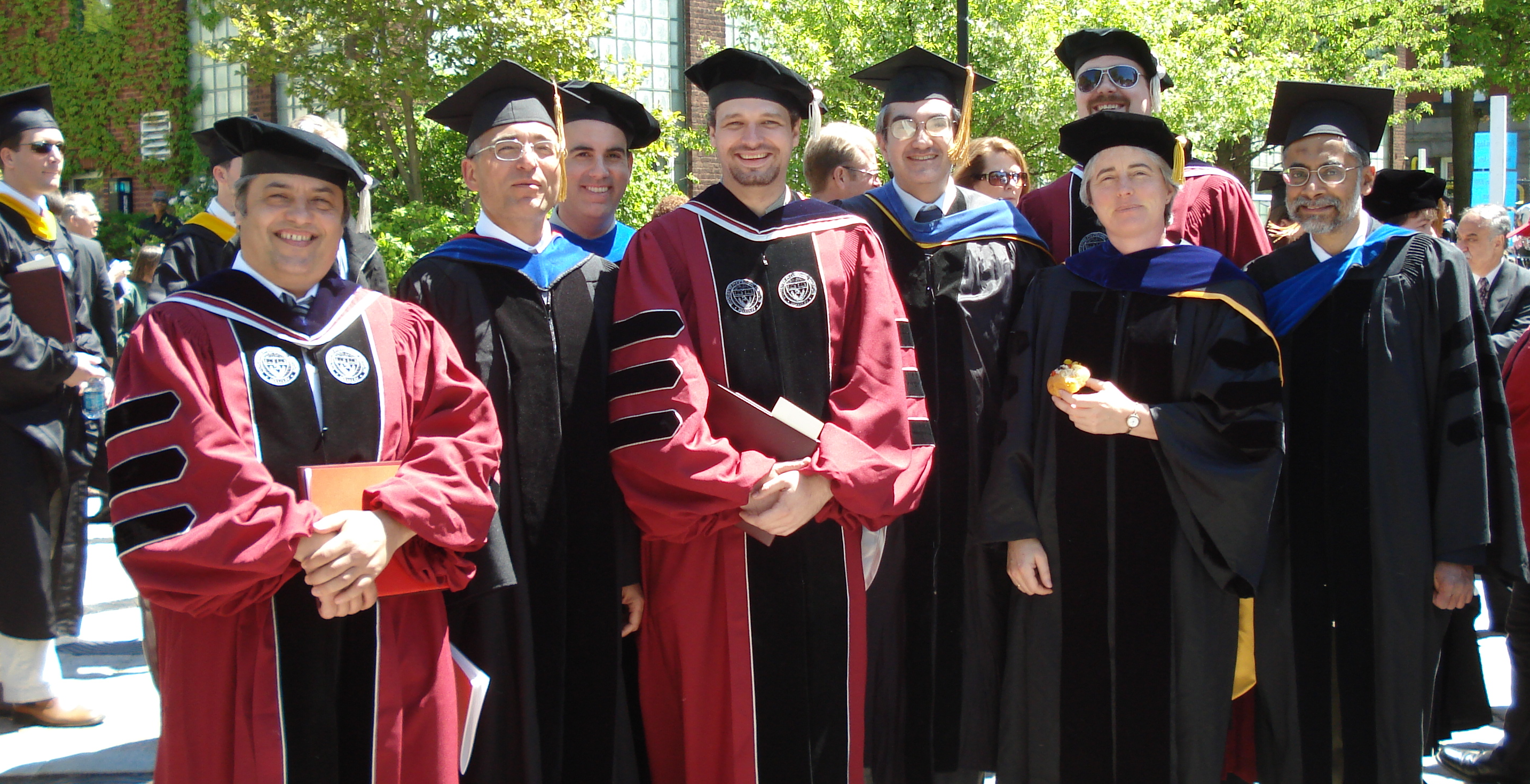
A group of new PhD graduates with their professors at Worcester Polytechnic Institute in Worcester, Massachusetts

The specific requirements to earn a PhD degree vary considerably according to the country, institution, and time period, from entry-level research degrees to higher doctorates. During the studies that lead to the degree, the student is called a doctoral student or PhD student or a research scholar; a student who has completed any necessary coursework and related examinations and is working on their thesis/dissertation is sometimes known as a doctoral candidate or PhD candidate. A student attaining this level may be granted a Candidate of Philosophy degree at some institutions or may be granted a master's degree en route to the doctoral degree. Sometimes this status is also colloquially known as "ABD", meaning "all but dissertation". PhD graduates may undertake a postdoc in the process of transitioning from study to academic tenure.

Individuals who have earned the Doctor of Philosophy degree use the title Doctor (often abbreviated "Dr" or "Dr."), although the etiquette associated with this usage may be subject to the professional ethics of the particular scholarly field, culture, or society. Those who teach at universities or work in academic, educational, or research fields are usually addressed by this title "professionally and socially in a salutation or conversation". Alternatively, holders may use post-nominal letters such as "Ph.D.", "PhD", or "DPhil", depending on the awarding institution. It is, however, traditionally considered incorrect to use both the title and post-nominals together, although usage in that regard has been evolving over time.

== History ==
=== Medieval and early modern Europe ===
The first doctoral degree was awarded at the University of Paris around 1150. In the universities of Medieval Europe, study was organized in four faculties: the basic faculty of arts, and the three higher faculties of theology, medicine, and laws (canon law and civil law). The doctorates in the higher faculties were quite different from the current PhD degree in that they were awarded for advanced scholarship, not original research. No dissertation or original work was required, only lengthy residency requirements and examinations.

All of these faculties awarded intermediate degrees (bachelors of arts, theology, laws and medicine) and final degrees. Initially, the titles of master and doctor were used interchangeably for the final degrees—the title Doctor was merely a formality bestowed on a Teacher/Master of the art—but by the late Middle Ages the terms Master of Arts and Doctor of Theology/Divinity, Doctor of Law, and Doctor of Medicine had become standard in most places (though in the German and Italian universities the term Doctor was used for all faculties).

Besides these degrees, there was the licentiate. Originally this was a license to teach, awarded shortly before the award of the master's or doctoral degree by the diocese in which the university was located, but later it evolved into an academic degree in its own right, in particular in the continental universities.

The full course of studies might, for example, lead in succession to the degrees of Bachelor of Arts, Licentiate of Arts, Master of Arts, or Bachelor of Medicine, Licentiate of Medicine, or Doctor of Medicine, but before the early modern era, many exceptions to this existed. Most students left the university without becoming masters of arts, whereas regulars (members of monastic orders) could skip the arts faculty entirely.

=== Educational reforms in Germany ===
This situation changed in the early 19th century through the educational reforms in Germany, most strongly embodied in the model of the University of Berlin, founded in 1810 and controlled by the Prussian government. The arts faculty, which in Germany was labelled the faculty of philosophy, started demanding contributions to research, attested by a dissertation, for the award of their final degree, which was labelled Doctor of Philosophy (abbreviated as Ph.D.)—originally this was just the German equivalent of the Master of Arts degree. Whereas in the Middle Ages the arts faculty had a set curriculum, based upon the trivium and the quadrivium, by the 19th century it had come to house all the courses of study in subjects now commonly referred to as sciences and humanities. Professors across the humanities and sciences focused on their advanced research.

These reforms proved extremely successful, and fairly quickly the German universities started attracting foreign students, notably from the United States. The American students would go to Germany to obtain a PhD after having studied for a bachelor's degree at an American college. So influential was this practice that it was imported to the United States, where in 1861 Yale University started granting the PhD degree to younger students who, after having obtained the bachelor's degree, had completed a prescribed course of graduate study and successfully defended a thesis or dissertation containing original research in science or in the humanities. In Germany, the name of the doctorate was adapted after the philosophy faculty started being split up − e.g. Dr. rer. nat. for doctorates in the faculty of natural sciences − but in most of the English-speaking world the name "Doctor of Philosophy" was retained for research doctorates in all disciplines.

The PhD degree and similar awards spread across Europe in the 19th and early 20th centuries. The degree was introduced in France in 1808, replacing diplomas as the highest academic degree; into Russia in 1819, when the Doktor Nauk degree, roughly equivalent to a PhD, gradually started replacing the specialist diploma, roughly equivalent to the MA, as the highest academic degree; and in Italy in the 1980s, when PhDs gradually started replacing the Laurea as the highest academic degree.

=== History in the United Kingdom ===
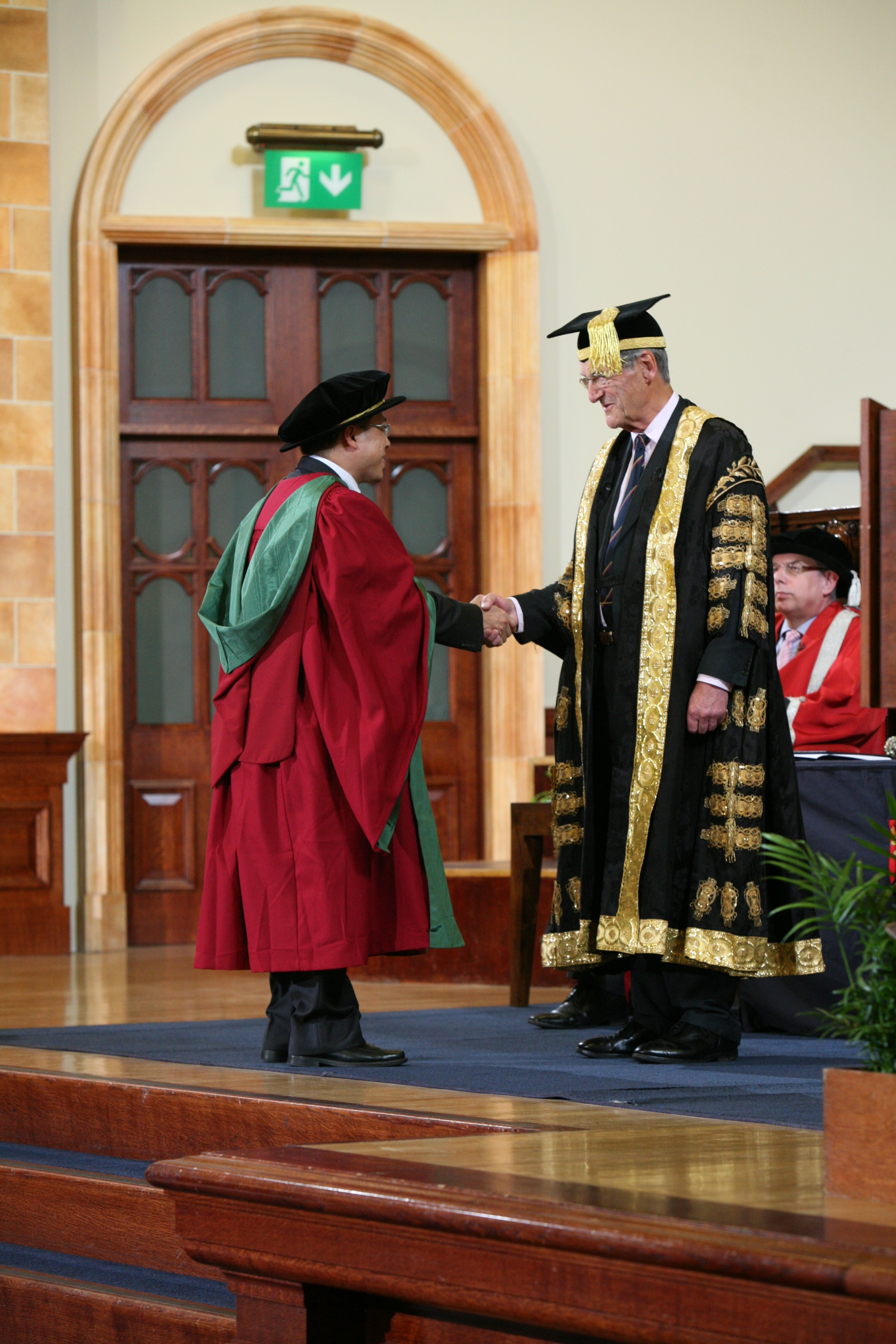
A new PhD graduate from the University of Birmingham, wearing a doctor's bonnet, shakes hands with the chancellor.

Research degrees first appeared in the UK in the late 19th century in the shape of the Doctor of Science (DSc or ScD) and other such "higher doctorates". The University of London introduced the DSc in 1860, but as an advanced study course, following on directly from the BSc, rather than a research degree. The first higher doctorate in the modern sense was Durham University's DSc, introduced in 1882.

This was soon followed by other universities, including the University of Cambridge establishing its ScD in the same year and the University of London transforming its DSc into a research degree in 1885. These were, however, very advanced degrees, rather than research-training degrees at the PhD level. Harold Jeffreys said that getting a Cambridge ScD was "more or less equivalent to being proposed for the Royal Society."

In 1917, the current PhD degree was introduced, along the lines of the American and German model, and quickly became popular with both British and foreign students. The slightly older degrees of Doctor of Science and Doctor of Literature/Letters still exist at British universities; together with the much older degrees of Doctor of Divinity (DD), Doctor of Music (DMus), Doctor of Civil Law (DCL), and Doctor of Medicine (MD), they form the higher doctorates, but apart from honorary degrees, they are only infrequently awarded.

In English (but not Scottish) universities, the Faculty of Arts had become dominant by the early 19th century. Indeed, the higher faculties had largely atrophied, since medical training had shifted to teaching hospitals, the legal training for the common law system was provided by the Inns of Court (with some minor exceptions, see Doctors' Commons), and few students undertook formal study in theology. This contrasted with the situation in the continental European (and Scottish) universities at the time, where the preparatory role of the Faculty of Philosophy or Arts was to a great extent taken over by secondary education: in modern France, the Baccalauréat is the examination taken at the end of secondary studies. The reforms at the Humboldt University transformed the Faculty of Philosophy or Arts (and its more recent successors such as the Faculty of Sciences) from a lower faculty into one on a par with the Faculties of Law and Medicine.

Similar developments occurred in many other continental European universities, and at least until reforms in the early 21st century, many European countries (e.g., Belgium, Spain, and the Scandinavian countries) had in all faculties triple degree structures of bachelor (or candidate) − licentiate − doctor as opposed to bachelor − master − doctor; the meaning of the different degrees varied from country to country, however. To this day, this is also still the case for the pontifical degrees in theology and canon law; for instance, in sacred theology, the degrees are Bachelor of Sacred Theology (STB), Licentiate of Sacred Theology (STL), and Doctor of Sacred Theology (STD), and in canon law: Bachelor of Canon Law (JCB), Licentiate of Canon Law (JCL), and Doctor of Canon Law (JCD).

=== History in the United States ===
Until the mid-19th century, advanced degrees were not a criterion for professorships at most colleges. That began to change as the more ambitious scholars at major schools went to Germany for one to three years to obtain a PhD in the sciences or humanities. Graduate schools slowly emerged in the United States. In 1852, the first honorary PhD in the nation was given at Bucknell University in Lewisburg, Pennsylvania to Ebenezer Newton Elliott. Nine years later, in 1861, Yale University awarded three PhDs: to Eugene Schuyler in philosophy and psychology, Arthur Williams Wright in physics, and James Morris Whiton Jr. in classics.

Over the following two decades, Harvard University, New York University, Princeton University, and the University of Pennsylvania, also began granting the degree. Major shifts toward graduate education were foretold by the opening of Clark University in 1887, which offered only graduate programs, and the Johns Hopkins University, which focused on its PhD program. By the 1890s, Harvard, Columbia, Michigan and Wisconsin were building major graduate programs, whose alumni were hired by new research universities. By 1900, 300 PhDs were awarded annually, most of them by six universities. It was no longer necessary to study in Germany. However, half of the institutions awarding earned PhDs in 1899 were undergraduate institutions that granted the degree for work done away from campus. Degrees awarded by universities without legitimate PhD programs accounted for about a third of the 382 doctorates recorded by the US Department of Education in 1900, of which another 8–10% were honorary. The awarding of PhD as an honorary degree was banned by the Board of Regents of the University of the State of New York in 1897. This had a nation-wide impact, and after 1907, less than 10 honorary PhDs were awarded in the United States each year. The last authenticated PhD awarded honoris causa was awarded in 1937 to Bing Crosby by Gonzaga University.

At the start of the 20th century, U.S. universities were held in low regard internationally and many American students were still traveling to Europe for PhDs. The lack of centralised authority meant anyone could start a university and award PhDs. This led to the formation of the Association of American Universities by 14 leading research universities (producing nearly 90% of the approximately 250 legitimate research doctorates awarded in 1900), with one of the main goals being to "raise the opinion entertained abroad of our own Doctor's Degree."

In Germany, the national government funded the universities and the research programs of the leading professors. It was impossible for professors who were not approved by Berlin to train graduate students. In the United States, by contrast, private universities and state universities alike were independent of the federal government. Independence was high, but funding was low. The breakthrough came from private foundations, which began regularly supporting research in science and history; large corporations sometimes supported engineering programs. The postdoctoral fellowship was established by the Rockefeller Foundation in 1919. Meanwhile, the leading universities, in cooperation with the learned societies, set up a network of scholarly journals. "Publish or perish" became the formula for faculty advancement in the research universities. After World War II, state universities across the country expanded greatly in undergraduate enrollment, and eagerly added research programs leading to masters or doctoral degrees. Their graduate faculties had to have a suitable record of publication and research grants. Late in the 20th century, "publish or perish" became increasingly important in colleges and smaller universities.

== Requirements ==
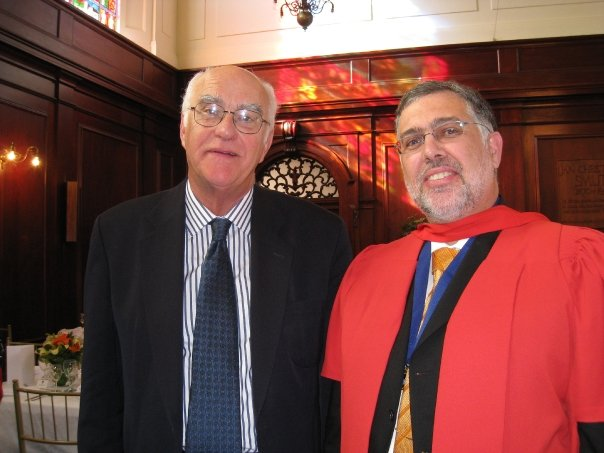
A South African PhD graduate (on the right, wearing a ceremonial gown)

Detailed requirements for the award of a PhD degree vary throughout the world and even from school to school. It is sometimes required for the student to hold an Honours degree or a Master's degree with high academic standing, in order to be considered for a PhD program. In Canada, India, Sweden and Denmark, for example, many universities require coursework in addition to research for PhD degrees. In other countries (such as the UK) there is generally no such condition, though this varies by university and field. Some individual universities or departments specify additional requirements for students not already in possession of a bachelor's degree or equivalent or higher. In order to submit a successful PhD admission application, copies of academic transcripts, letters of recommendation, a research proposal, and a personal statement are often required. Most universities also invite for a special interview before admission.

A candidate must submit a project, thesis, or dissertation often consisting of a body of original academic research, which is in principle worthy of publication in a peer-reviewed context. Moreover, some PhD programs, especially in science, require one to three published articles in peer-reviewed journals. In many countries, a candidate must defend this work before a panel of expert examiners appointed by the university; this defense is open to the public in some countries, and held in private in others; in other countries, the dissertation is examined by a panel of expert examiners who stipulate whether the dissertation is in principle passable and any issues that need to be addressed before the dissertation can be passed.

Some universities in the non-English-speaking world have begun adopting similar standards to those of the anglophone PhD degree for their research doctorates (see the Bologna process).

A PhD student or candidate is conventionally required to study on campus under close supervision. With the popularity of distance education and e-learning technologies, some universities now accept students enrolled into a distance education part-time mode.

In a "sandwich PhD" program, PhD candidates do not spend their entire study period at the same university. Instead, the PhD candidates spend the first and last periods of the program at their home universities and in between conduct research at another institution or field research. Occasionally a "sandwich PhD" will be awarded by two universities.

It is possible to broaden the field of study pursued by a PhD student by the addition of a minor subject of study within a different discipline.

== Value and criticism ==
A career in academia generally requires a PhD, although in some countries it is possible to reach relatively high positions without a doctorate. In North America, professors are increasingly being required to have a PhD, and the percentage of faculty with a PhD may be used as a university ratings measure.

The motivation may also include increased salary, but in many cases, this is not the result. Research by Bernard H. Casey of the University of Warwick, UK, suggests that, over all subjects, PhDs provide an earnings premium of 26% over non-accredited graduates, but notes that master's degrees already provide a premium of 23% and a bachelor's 14%. While this is a small return to the individual (or even an overall deficit when tuition and lost earnings during training are accounted for), he claims there are significant benefits to society for the extra research training. However, some research suggests that overqualified workers are often less satisfied and less productive at their jobs. These difficulties are increasingly being felt by graduates of professional degrees, such as law school, looking to find employment. PhD students may need to take on debt to undertake their degree.

A PhD is sometimes felt to be a necessary qualification in certain areas of employment, such as in foreign policy think-tanks: U.S. News & World Report wrote in 2013 that "[i]f having a master's degree at the minimum is de rigueur in Washington's foreign policy world, it is no wonder many are starting to feel that the PhD is a necessary escalation, another case of costly signaling to potential employers". Similarly, an article on the Australian public service states that "credentialism in the public service is seeing a dramatic increase in the number of graduate positions going to PhDs and masters degrees becoming the base entry level qualification".

The Economist published an article in 2010 citing various criticisms against the state of PhDs. These included a prediction by economist Richard B. Freeman that, based on pre-2000 data, only 20% of life science PhD students would gain a faculty job in the U.S., and that in Canada 80% of postdoctoral research fellows earned less than or equal to an average construction worker ($38,600 a year). According to the article, only the fastest developing countries (e.g. China or Brazil) have a shortage of PhDs. In 2022, Nature reported that PhD students' wages in biological sciences in the US do not cover living costs.

The U.S. higher education system often offers little incentive to move students through PhD programs quickly and may even provide incentives to slow them down. To counter this problem, the United States introduced the Doctor of Arts degree in 1970 with seed money from the Carnegie Foundation for the Advancement of Teaching. The aim of the Doctor of Arts degree was to shorten the time needed to complete the degree by focusing on pedagogy over research, although the Doctor of Arts still contains a significant research component. Germany is one of the few nations engaging these issues, and it has been doing so by reconceptualising PhD programs to be training for careers, outside academia, but still at high-level positions. This development can be seen in the extensive number of PhD holders, typically from the fields of law, engineering, and economics, at the very top corporate and administrative positions.

Mark C. Taylor opined in 2011 in Nature that total reform of PhD programs in almost every field is necessary in the U.S. and that pressure to make the necessary changes will need to come from many sources (students, administrators, public and private sectors, etc.). Other articles in Nature have also examined the issue of PhD reform.

Freeman Dyson, then professor emeritus at the Institute for Advanced Study in Princeton, was opposed to the PhD system and did not have a PhD degree.

PhD students’ well-being have been studied by researchers, and relevant theoretical framework and guidelines have been proposed. Research has revealed findings on PhD students’ well-being. A study of USA nationwide clinical and counseling psychology PhD students reflects that the rates of mental and physical health symptomatology are higher than the population, and more than 30 percent of the sample experience anxiety, depression, both, or physical symptoms. Another study of a UK sample of both academics and PhD students found that, for both PhD students and academics, the positive impact of research work demand is positively correlated with mental health.

Different types of demands faced by PhD students have been identified: challenge demands (such as research complexity) are deemed positive as they motivate PhD students to accomplish their goals, while hindrance demands (such as program ambiguity) are demands that cause stress. It was also argued that demands that are placed on PhD students should be balanced by the resources provided for them to succeed. These resources include contextual resources, including institutional, supervisory, and social support (like friends and family), as well as internal resources such as intrinsic motivation. Similarly, a multilevel or multifaceted structure of support has been proposed by other scholars.

Some guidelines on PhD students’ well-being were provided. Potential suggestions for PhD students’ well-being include distributing teaching load fairly to the students, being transparent about program completion requirements, weekly supervisory meetings, supervisory emotional support, and training for supervisors to support students’ psychological needs.

== Degrees by country ==
The UNESCO, in its International Standard Classification of Education (ISCED), states that: "Programmes to be classified at ISCED level 8 are referred to in many ways around the world such as PhD, DPhil, D.Lit, D.Sc, LL.D, Doctorate or similar terms. However, programmes with a similar name to 'doctor' should only be included in ISCED level 8 if they satisfy the criteria described in Paragraph 263. For international comparability purposes, the term 'doctoral or equivalent' is used to label ISCED level 8."

=== National variations ===
In German-speaking nations, most Eastern European nations, successor states of the former Soviet Union, most parts of Africa, Asia, and many Spanish-speaking countries, the corresponding degree to a Doctor of Philosophy is simply called "Doctor" (Doktor), and the subject area is distinguished by a Latin suffix (e.g., "Dr. med." for Doctor medicinae, Doctor of Medicine; "Dr. rer. nat." for Doctor rerum naturalium, Doctor of the Natural Sciences; "Dr. phil." for Doctor philosophiae, Doctor of Philosophy; "Dr. iur." for Doctor iuris, Doctor of Laws).

=== Argentina ===
==== Admission ====
In Argentina, the admission to a PhD program at public Argentine University requires the full completion of a Master's degree or a Licentiate degree. Non-Argentine Master's titles are generally accepted into a PhD program when the degree comes from a recognized university.

==== Funding ====
While a significant portion of postgraduate students finance their tuition and living costs with teaching or research work at private and state-run institutions, international institutions, such as the Fulbright Program and the Organization of American States (OAS), have been known to grant full scholarships for tuition with apportions for housing.

Others apply for funds to CONICET, the national public body of scientific and technical research, which typically awards more than a thousand scholarships each year for this purpose, thus guaranteeing many PhD candidates remain within the system.

==== Requirements for completion ====
Upon completion of at least two years' research and coursework as a graduate student, a candidate must demonstrate truthful and original contributions to their specific field of knowledge within a frame of academic excellence. The doctoral candidate's work should be presented in a dissertation or thesis prepared under the supervision of a tutor or director and reviewed by a Doctoral Committee. This committee should be composed of examiners that are external to the program, and at least one of them should also be external to the institution. The academic degree of Doctor, respective to the correspondent field of science that the candidate has contributed with original and rigorous research, is received after a successful defense of the candidate's dissertation.

=== Australia ===
==== Admission ====
Admission to a PhD program in Australia requires applicants to demonstrate capacity to undertake research in the proposed field of study. The standard requirement is a bachelor honours degree with either first-class or upper second-class honours. Research master's degrees and coursework master's degrees with a 25% research component are usually considered equivalent. It is also possible for research master's degree students to "upgrade" to PhD candidature after demonstrating sufficient progress.

==== Scholarships ====
PhD students are sometimes offered a scholarship to study for their PhD degree. The most common of these was the government-funded Australian Postgraduate Award (APA) until its dissolution in 2017. It was replaced by Research Training Program (RTP), awarded to students of "exceptional research potential", which provides a living stipend to students of approximately A$34,000 a year (tax-free). RTPs are paid for a duration of 3 years, while a 6-month extension is usually possible upon citing delays out of the control of the student. Some universities also fund a similar scholarship that matches the APA amount. Due to a continual increase in living costs, many PhD students are forced to live under the poverty line. In addition to the more common RTP and university scholarships, Australian students have other sources of scholarship funding, coming from industry, private enterprise, and organisations.

==== Fees ====
Australian citizens, permanent residents, and New Zealand citizens are not charged course fees for their PhD or research master's degree, with the exception in some universities of the student services and amenities fee (SSAF) which is set by each university and typically involves the largest amount allowed by the Australian government. All fees are paid for by the Australian government, except for the SSAF, under the Research Training Program. International students and coursework master's degree students must pay course fees unless they receive a scholarship to cover them.

==== Requirements for completion ====
Completion requirements vary. Most Australian PhD programs do not have a required coursework component. The credit points attached to the degree are all in the product of the research, which is usually an 80,000-word thesis that makes a significant new contribution to the field. Recent pressure on higher degree by research (HDR) students to publish has resulted in increasing interest in PhD by publication as opposed to the more traditional PhD by dissertation, which typically requires a minimum of two publications, but which also requires traditional thesis elements such as an introductory exegesis, and linking chapters between papers. The PhD thesis is sent to external examiners who are experts in the field of research and who have not been involved in the work. Examiners are nominated by the candidate's university, and their identities are often not revealed to the candidate until the examination is complete. A formal oral defence is generally not part of the examination of the thesis, largely because of the distances that would need to be travelled by the overseas examiners; however, since 2016, there is a trend toward implementing this in many Australian universities. At the University of South Australia, PhD candidates who started after January 2016 now undertake an oral defence via an online conference with two examiners.

=== Canada ===
==== Admission ====
Admission to a doctoral programme at a university in Canada typically requires completion of a Master's degree in a related field, with sufficiently high grades and proven research ability. In some cases, a student may progress directly from an Honours Bachelor's degree to a PhD program; other programs allow a student to fast-track to a doctoral program after one year of outstanding work in a Master's program (without having to complete the Master's).

An application package typically includes a research proposal, letters of reference, transcripts, and in some cases, a writing sample or Graduate Record Examinations scores. A common criterion for prospective PhD students is the comprehensive or qualifying examination, a process that often commences in the second year of a graduate program. Generally, successful completion of the qualifying exam permits continuance in the graduate program. Formats for this examination include oral examination by the student's faculty committee (or a separate qualifying committee), or written tests designed to demonstrate the student's knowledge in a specialized area (see below) or both.

At English-speaking universities, a student may also be required to demonstrate English language abilities, usually by achieving an acceptable score on a standard examination (for example the Test of English as a Foreign Language). Depending on the field, the student may also be required to demonstrate ability in one or more additional languages. A prospective student applying to French-speaking universities may also have to demonstrate some English language ability.

==== Funding ====
While some students work outside the university (or at student jobs within the university), in some programs students are advised (or must agree) not to devote more than ten hours per week to activities (e.g., employment) outside of their studies, particularly if they have been given funding. For large and prestigious scholarships, such as those from NSERC and Fonds québécois de la recherche sur la nature et les technologies, this is an absolute requirement.

At some Canadian universities, most PhD students receive an award equivalent to part or all of the tuition amount for the first four years (this is sometimes called a tuition deferral or tuition waiver). Other sources of funding include teaching assistantships and research assistantships; experience as a teaching assistant is encouraged but not requisite in many programs. Some programs may require all PhD candidates to teach, which may be done under the supervision of their supervisor or regular faculty. Besides these sources of funding, there are also various competitive scholarships, bursaries, and awards available, such as those offered by the federal government via NSERC, CIHR, or SSHRC.

==== Requirements for completion ====
In general, the first two years of study are devoted to completion of coursework and the comprehensive examinations. At this stage, the student is known as a "PhD student" or "doctoral student." It is usually expected that the student will have completed most of their required coursework by the end of this stage. Furthermore, it is usually required that by the end of eighteen to thirty-six months after the first registration, the student will have successfully completed the comprehensive exams.

Upon successful completion of the comprehensive exams, the student becomes known as a "PhD candidate." From this stage on, the bulk of the student's time will be devoted to their own research, culminating in the completion of a PhD thesis or dissertation. The final requirement is an oral defense of the thesis, which is open to the public in some, but not all, universities. At most Canadian universities, the time needed to complete a PhD degree typically ranges from four to six years. It is, however, not uncommon for students to be unable to complete all the requirements within six years, particularly given that funding packages often support students for only two to four years; many departments will allow program extensions at the discretion of the thesis supervisor or department chair. Alternative arrangements exist whereby a student is allowed to let their registration in the program lapse at the end of six years and re-register once the thesis is completed in draft form. The general rule is that graduate students are obligated to pay tuition until the initial thesis submission has been received by the thesis office. In other words, if a PhD student defers or delays the initial submission of their thesis they remain obligated to pay fees until such time that the thesis has been received in good standing.

=== China ===
In China, doctoral programs can be applied directly after obtaining a bachelor's degree or applied after obtaining a master's degree. Those who directly apply for a doctoral program after a bachelor's degree usually need four to five years to obtain a doctorate and will not be awarded a master's degree during the period.

The courses at the doctoral level are mainly completed in the first and second years, and the remaining years are spent doing experiments/research and writing papers. At most universities, the maximum duration of doctoral study is 7 years. If a doctoral student does not complete their degree within 7 years, it is likely that they can only obtain a study certificate without any degree.

China has thirteen statutory types of academic degrees, which also apply to doctorates. Despite the naming difference, all these thirteen types of doctoral degrees are research and academic degrees that are equivalent to PhD degrees. These thirteen doctorates are:

- Doctor of Philosophy (for the discipline of philosophy)
- Doctor of Economics
- Doctor of Law
- Doctor of Education
- Doctor of Literature
- Doctor of History
- Doctor of Science
- Doctor of Engineering
- Doctor of Agriculture
- Doctor of Medicine (equivalent to a PhD in medical sciences)
- Doctor of Military
- Doctor of Management
- Doctor of Fine Arts.

In international academic communication, Chinese doctoral degree recipients sometimes translate their doctoral degree names to PhD in Discipline (such as PhD in Engineering, Computer Science) to facilitate peer understanding.

=== Colombia ===
==== Admission ====
In Colombia, the PhD course admission may require a master's degree (Magíster) in some universities, specially public universities. However, it could also be applied for a direct doctorate in specific cases, according to the jury's recommendations on the thesis proposal.

==== Funding ====
Most of postgraduate students in Colombia must finance their tuition fees by means of teaching assistant seats or research works. Some institutions such as Colciencias, Colfuturo, CeiBA, and Icetex grant scholarships or provide awards in the form of forgivable loans.

==== Requirements for completion ====
After two or two and a half years, it is expected that the research work of the doctoral candidate be submitted in the form of oral qualification, where suggestions and corrections about the research hypothesis and methodology, as well as on the course of the research work, are performed. The PhD degree is only received after a successful defense of the candidate's thesis is performed (four or five years after the enrollment), most of the time also requiring the most important results having been published in at least one peer-reviewed high-impact international journal.

=== Finland ===
In Finland, the degree of filosofian tohtori (abbreviated FT) is awarded by traditional universities, such as University of Helsinki. A Master's degree is required, and the doctorate combines approximately 4–5 years of research (amounting to 3–5 scientific articles, some of which must be first-author) and 60 ECTS points of studies. Other universities such as Aalto University award degrees such as tekniikan tohtori (TkT, engineering), taiteen tohtori (TaT, art), etc., which are translated in English to Doctor of Science (D.Sc.), and they are formally equivalent. The licentiate (filosofian lisensiaatti or FL) requires only 2–3 years of research and is sometimes done before an FT.

=== France ===
==== History ====
Before 1984 three research doctorates existed in France: the State doctorate (doctorat d'État, the old doctorate introduced in 1808), the third cycle doctorate (doctorat de troisième cycle, created in 1954 and shorter than the State doctorate) and the diploma of doctor-engineer (diplôme de docteur-ingénieur created in 1923), for technical research. After 1984, only one type of doctoral degree remained, called "doctorate" (Doctorat). The latter is equivalent to the PhD.

==== Admission ====
Students pursuing the PhD degree must first complete a master's degree program, which takes two years after graduation with a bachelor's degree (five years in total). The candidate must apply to a doctoral research project associated with a doctoral advisor (Directeur de thèse or directeur doctoral) with a habilitation throughout the doctoral program.

The PhD admission is granted by a graduate school (in French, "école doctorale"). A PhD candidate may follow some in-service training offered by the graduate school while continuing their research in a laboratory. Their research may be carried out in a laboratory, at a university or in a company. In the first case, the candidates can be hired by the university or a research organisation. In the last case, the company hires the candidate and they are supervised by both the company's tutor and a lab's professor. Completion of the PhD degree generally requires 3 years after the master's degree but it can last longer in specific cases.

==== Funding ====
The financing of PhD research comes mainly from funds for research of the French Ministry of Higher Education and Research. The most common procedure is a short-term employment contract called doctoral contract: the institution of higher education is the employer and the PhD candidate the employee. However, the candidate can apply for funds from a company, which can host them at its premises (as in the case where PhD candidates do their research at a company). In another possible situation, the company and the institute can sign a funding agreement together so that the candidate still has a public doctoral contract but is works at the company on a daily basis (for example, this is particularly the case for the (French) Scientific Cooperation Foundation). Many other resources come from some regional/city projects, some associations, etc.

=== Germany ===
==== Admission ====
In Germany, admission to a doctoral program is generally on the basis of having an advanced degree (i.e., a master's degree, diplom, magister, or staatsexamen), mostly in a related field and having above-average grades. A candidate must also find a tenured professor from a university to serve as the formal advisor and supervisor (Betreuer) of the dissertation throughout the doctoral program. This supervisor is informally referred to as Doktorvater or Doktormutter, which literally translate to "doctor's father" and "doctor's mother" respectively. The formal admission is the beginning of the so-called Promotionsverfahren, while the final granting of the degree is called Promotion.

The duration of the doctorate depends on the field. A doctorate in medicine may take less than a full-time year to complete; those in other fields, two to six years. Most doctorates are awarded with specific Latin designations for the field of research (except for engineering, where the designation is German), instead of a general name for all fields (such as the PhD). The most important degrees are:

- Dr. rer. nat. (rerum naturalium; natural and formal sciences, i.e. physics, chemistry, biology, mathematics, computer science and information technology, or psychology);
- Dr. phil. (philosophiae; humanities such as philosophy, philology, history, and social sciences such as sociology, political science, or psychology as well);
- Dr. iur. (iuris; law);
- Dr. oec. (oeconomiae; economics);
- Dr. rer. pol. (rerum politicarum; economics, business administration, political science);
- Dr. theol. (theologiae; theology);
- Dr. med. (medicinae; medicine);
- Dr. med. dent. (medicinae dentariae; dentistry);
- Dr. med. vet. (medicinae veterinariae; veterinary medicine);
- Dr. rer. med. (rerum medicarum; medical science; a researcher, not a physician);
- Dr.-Ing. (engineering).

Over fifty such designations exist, many of them rare or no longer in use. As a title, the degree is commonly written in front of the name in abbreviated form, e.g., Dr. rer. nat. Max Mustermann or Dr. Max Mustermann, dropping the designation entirely. However, leaving out the designation is only allowed when the doctoral degree is not an honorary doctorate, which must be indicated by Dr. h.c. (from Latin honoris causa).

While most German doctorates are considered equivalent to the PhD, an exception is the medical doctorate, where "doctoral" dissertations are often written alongside undergraduate study. The European Research Council decided in 2010 that those doctorates do not meet the international standards of a PhD research degree. There are different forms of university-level institution in Germany, but only professors from "Universities" (Univ.-Prof.) can serve as doctoral supervisors – "Universities of Applied Sciences" (Fachhochschulen) are not entitled to award doctorates, although some exceptions apply to this rule.

==== Structure ====
Depending on the university, doctoral students (Doktoranden) can be required to attend formal classes or lectures, some of them also including exams or other scientific assignments, in order to get one or more certificates of qualification (Qualifikationsnachweise). Depending on the doctoral regulations (Promotionsordnung) of the university and sometimes on the status of the doctoral student, such certificates may not be required. Usually, former students, research assistants or lecturers from the same university, may be spared from attending extra classes. Instead, under the tutelage of a single professor or advisory committee, they are expected to conduct independent research. In addition to doctoral studies, many doctoral candidates work as teaching assistants, research assistants, or lecturers.

Many universities have established research-intensive Graduiertenkollegs ("graduate colleges"), which are graduate schools that provide funding for doctoral studies.

==== Duration ====
The typical duration of a doctoral program can depend heavily on the subject and area of research. Usually, three to five years of full-time research work are required. The average time to graduation is 4.5 years.

In 2014, the median age of new PhD graduates was 30.4 years.

=== India ===
In India, a master's degree is usually required to gain admission to a doctoral program. Direct admission to a PhD program after graduating to BTech may also be granted by the IITs, the IIITs, the NITs, and the Academy of Scientific and Innovative Research. In some subjects, completing a Master of Philosophy (MPhil) is a prerequisite to obtaining funding/fellowship for a PhD.

According to new rules prescribed by the UGC, universities must conduct Research Eligibility Tests in ability and the selected subject. After clearing these tests, the shortlisted candidates are required to appear for an interview with the available PhD supervisor and give presentations of their research proposal (plan of work or synopsis). During study, candidates must submit progress reports and after successful completion of the coursework, are required to give a pre-submission presentation and finally defend their thesis in an open defense viva-voce. It is mandatory in India to qualify for the National Eligibility Test to apply for a professorship, lectureship or Junior Research Fellowship (NET for LS and JRF) conducted by the National Testing Agency (NTA).

=== Italy ===
==== History ====
The Dottorato di ricerca (research doctorate), abbreviated to "Dott. Ric." or "PhD", is an academic title awarded at the end of a course of not less than three years, admission to which is based on entrance examinations and academic rankings in the Bachelor of Arts ("Laurea", a three-year diploma) and Master of Arts ("Laurea Magistrale" a two-year diploma). While the standard PhD follows the Bologna process, the MD–PhD programme may be completed in two years.

The first institution in Italy to create a doctoral program (PhD) was Scuola Normale Superiore di Pisa in 1927 under the historic name "Diploma di Perfezionamento". Further, the research doctorates or PhD (Dottorato di ricerca) in Italy were introduced by law and Presidential Decree in 1980, referring to the reform of academic teaching, training and experimentation in organisation and teaching methods.

The Superior Graduate Schools in Italy (Scuola Superiore Universitaria), also called Schools of Excellence (Scuole di Eccellenza) such as Scuola Normale Superiore di Pisa and Sant'Anna School of Advanced Studies still keep their reputed historical "Diploma di Perfezionamento" PhD title by law and MIUR Decree.

==== Admission ====
Doctorate courses are open, without age or citizenship limits, to all those who already hold a "laurea magistrale" (master degree) or similar academic title awarded abroad which has been recognised as equivalent to an Italian degree by the Committee responsible for the entrance examinations.

The number of places on offer each year and details of the entrance examinations are set out in the examination announcement.

=== Poland ===
In Poland, a doctoral degree (Pol. doktor), abbreviated to PhD (Pol. dr) is an advanced academic degree awarded by universities in most fields and by the Polish Academy of Sciences, regulated by the Polish parliament acts and the government orders, in particular by the Ministry of Science and Higher Education of the Republic of Poland. Students with a master's degree or equivalent are accepted to a doctoral entrance exam. The title of PhD is awarded to a scientist who has completed a minimum of three years of PhD studies (Pol. studia doktoranckie; not required to obtain PhD), finished a theoretical or laboratory scientific work, passed all PhD examinations; submitted the dissertation, a document presenting the author's research and findings, and successfully defended the doctoral thesis. Typically, upon completion, the candidate undergoes an oral examination, always public, by a supervisory committee with expertise in the given discipline.

=== Scandinavia ===
The doctorate was introduced in Sweden in 1477 and in Denmark–Norway in 1479 and awarded in theology, law, and medicine, while the magister's degree was the highest degree at the Faculty of Philosophy, equivalent to the doctorate.

Scandinavian countries were among the early adopters of a degree known as a doctorate of philosophy, based upon the German model. Denmark and Norway both introduced the Dr. Phil(os). degree in 1824, replacing the Magister's degree as the highest degree, while Uppsala University of Sweden renamed its Magister's degree Filosofie Doktor (fil. dr) in 1863. These degrees, however, became comparable to the German Habilitation rather than the doctorate, as Scandinavian countries did not have a separate Habilitation.

The degrees were uncommon and not a prerequisite for employment as a professor; rather, they were seen as distinctions similar to the British (higher) doctorates (DLitt, DSc). Denmark introduced an American-style PhD, the ph.d., in 1989; it formally replaced the Licentiate's degree and is considered a lower degree than the dr. phil. degree; officially, the ph.d. is not considered a doctorate, but unofficially, it is referred to as "the smaller doctorate", as opposed to the dr. phil., "the grand doctorate." Holders of a ph.d. degree are not entitled to style themselves as "Dr." Currently Denmark distinctions between the dr. phil. as the proper doctorate and a higher degree than the ph.d., whereas in Norway, the historically analogous dr. philos. degree is officially regarded as equivalent to the new ph.d. Today, the Norwegian PhD degree is awarded to candidates who have completed a supervised doctoral programme at an institution, while candidates with a master's degree who have conducted research on their own may submit their work for a Dr. Philos. defence at a relevant institution. PhD candidates must complete one trial lecture before they can defend their thesis, whereas Dr. Philos. candidates must complete two trial lectures.

In Sweden, the doctorate of philosophy was introduced at Uppsala University's Faculty of Philosophy in 1863. In Sweden, the Latin term is officially translated into Swedish filosofie doktor and commonly abbreviated fil. dr or FD. The degree represents the traditional Faculty of Philosophy and encompasses subjects from biology, physics, and chemistry, to languages, history, and social sciences, being the highest degree in these disciplines. Sweden currently has two research-level degrees, the Licentiate's degree, which is comparable to the Danish degree formerly known as the Licentiate's degree and now as the ph.d., and the higher doctorate of philosophy, Filosofie Doktor. Some universities in Sweden also use the term teknologie doktor for doctorates awarded by institutes of technology (for doctorates in engineering or natural science related subjects such as materials science, molecular biology, computer science etc.). The Swedish term fil. dr is often also used as a translation of corresponding degrees from e.g. Denmark and Norway.

=== Singapore ===
Singapore has six universities offering doctoral study opportunities: National University of Singapore, Nanyang Technological University, Singapore Management University, Singapore Institute of Technology, Singapore University of Technology and Design, and Singapore University of Social Sciences.

=== South Africa ===
The first doctoral degree in South Africa was issued in 1899 by the University of the Cape of Good Hope (now University of South Africa or UNISA) and the first PhDs were conferred in the 1920s by the University of Cape Town and the University of the Witwatersrand. Owing to the influence of British colonialism, South African higher education bears profound similarities to the modern UK universities system. South Africa boasts twenty-six state universities, all of which offer doctoral degrees. Presently, only two private institutions offer accredited PhDs, including the South African Theological Seminary and St. Augustine College of South Africa. Typically, South African colleges and universities abbreviate Doctor of Philosophy with either PhD or DPhil.

==== Admission ====
South African PhD programs require both a four-year undergraduate and a relevant graduate degree. Certain PhD programs require preexisting knowledge of research languages or field experience. Some programs require applicants undergo an interview or provide references, a curriculum vitae, and letters of recommendation. Typically, PhD applicants must furnish a provisional research proposal which discloses the basic trajectory of their area of interest. English competency is a universal requirement.

==== Structure and duration ====
Akin to PhD programs in the UK and in the Netherlands, South African PhD programs consist of a research thesis or dissertation produced under the supervision of a subject-matter expert. South African PhD programs are designed to result in a substantial piece of scholarship that has undergone critical evaluation through peer review. Unlike PhD programs in many other African countries or the US, South African PhD programs rarely involve coursework and are undertaken through rigorous and semi-independent research. Most South African PhD programs are designed to be completed within three to six years.

=== Spain ===
In Spain, doctoral degrees are regulated by Real Decreto (royal decree) 99/2011 from the 2014/2015 academic year. They are granted by a university on behalf of the king, and the PhD diploma has the force of a public document. The Ministry of Science keeps a national registry of theses called TESEO.

All doctoral programs are of a research nature. The studies should include original results and can take a maximum of three years, although this period can be extended under certain circumstances to five years.

The student must write their thesis presenting a new discovery or original contribution to science. If approved by her or his thesis director (or directors), the study will be presented to a panel of three to five distinguished scholars. Any doctor attending the public presentations is allowed to challenge the candidate with questions on their research. If approved, they will receive the doctorate. Four grades can be awarded: no apto (unsatisfactory), aprobado (approved), notable (notable) and sobresaliente (outstanding). Cum laude (with honour) can be added to degrees graded outstanding if all five members of the tribunal agree.

The social standing of doctors in Spain was evidenced by the fact that Philip III let PhD holders to take seat and cover their heads during an act in the University of Salamanca in which the king took part so as to recognise their merits. This right to cover their heads in the presence of the king is traditionally reserved in Spain to grandees and dukes. The concession is remembered in solemn ceremonies held by the university by telling doctors to take seat and cover their heads as a reminder of that royal leave.

Spanish doctoral degree holders are reciprocally recognized as equivalent in Germany and Spain under the Bonn Agreement of November 14, 1994.

=== Ukraine ===
In Ukraine, starting in 2016, in Ukraine Doctor of Philosophy (PhD, Ukrainian: Доктор філософії) is the highest education level and the first science degree. PhD is awarded in recognition of a substantial contribution to scientific knowledge, origination of new directions and visions in science. A PhD degree is a prerequisite for heading a university department in Ukraine. Upon completion of a PhD, a PhD holder can elect to continue their studies and get a post-doctoral degree called "Doctor of Sciences" (DSc. Ukrainian: Доктор наук), which is the second and the highest science degree in Ukraine.

=== United Kingdom ===
==== Admission ====
In the United Kingdom, universities admit applicants to PhD programs on a case-by-case basis; depending on the university, admission is typically conditional on the prospective student having completed an undergraduate degree with at least upper second-class honours or a postgraduate master's degree but requirements can vary even within institutions. For example, the University of Edinburgh requires a minimum of a 2:1 honours degree (or international equivalent) for a PhD in clinical psychology, while its business school requires a master's degree with an average of 65% in the taught components and a distinction-level dissertation.

For students who are not from English-speaking countries, UK Visas and Immigration requires universities to assess English proficiency. Many do this using IELTS tests, although the requirements may vary depending on the institution. 143 UK universities require applicants to undergo IELTS before admission, with minimum acceptable scores ranging from 4 to 6.5 and above. However, some universities are willing to accept students without IELTS.

Students are first accepted onto an MPhil or MRes programme and may transfer to PhD regulations upon satisfactory progress, this is sometimes referred to as APG (Advanced Postgraduate) status. This is typically done after one or two years and the research work done may count towards the PhD degree. If a student fails to make satisfactory progress, they may be offered the opportunity to write up and submit for an MPhil degree, e.g. at King's College London and the University of Manchester. In many universities, the MPhil is also offered as a stand-alone research degree.

PhD students from outside the EU/EEA or other exempt countries are required to comply with the Academic Technology Approval Scheme (ATAS), which involves undergoing a security clearance process with the Foreign Office for courses in sensitive areas where research could be used for weapons development. This requirement was introduced in 2007 due to concerns about overseas terrorism and weapons proliferation.

==== Funding ====
In the United Kingdom, funding for PhD students is sometimes provided by government-funded Research Councils (UK Research and Innovation – UKRI) or the European Social Fund, usually in the form of a tax-free bursary which consists of tuition fees together with a stipend. Tuition fees are charged at different rates for "Home/EU" and "Overseas" students, generally £3,000–£6,000 per year for the former and £9,000–14,500 for the latter (which includes EU citizens who have not been normally resident in the EEA for the last three years), although this can rise to over £16,000 at elite institutions. Higher fees are often charged for laboratory-based degrees. As of 2022/23, the national indicative fee for PhD students is £4,596, increasing annually, typically with inflation; there is no regulation of the fees charged by institutions, but if they charge a higher fee they may not require Research Council funded students to make up any difference themselves.

As of 2022/23, the national minimum stipend for UKRI-funded students is £16,062 per year, increasing annually typically with inflation. The period of funding for a PhD project is between three and four years, depending on the research council and the decisions of individual institutions, with extensions in funding of up to twelve months available to offset periods of absence for maternity leave, shared parental leave, adoption leave, absences covered by a medical certificate, and extended jury service. PhD work beyond this may be unfunded or funded from other sources. A very small number of scientific studentships are sometimes paid at a higher rate – for example, in London, Cancer Research UK, the ICR and the Wellcome Trust stipend rates start at around £19,000 and progress annually to around £23,000 a year; an amount that is tax and national insurance free. Research Council funding is distributed to Doctoral Training Partnerships and Centres for Doctoral Training, who are responsible for student selection, within the eligibility guidelines established by the Research Councils. The ESRC (Economic and Social Science Research Council), for example, explicitly state that a 2.1 minimum (or a master's degree) is required.

Many students who are not in receipt of external funding may choose to undertake the degree part-time, thus reducing the tuition fees. The tuition fee per annum for part-time PhD degrees are typically 50–60% of the equivalent full-time doctorate. However, since the duration of a part-time PhD degree is longer than a full-time degree, the overall cost may be the same or higher. The part-time PhD degree option provides free time in which to earn money for subsistence. Students may also take part in tutoring, work as research assistants, or (occasionally) deliver lectures, at a rate of typically £12–14 per hour, either to supplement existing low income or as a sole means of funding.

==== Completion ====
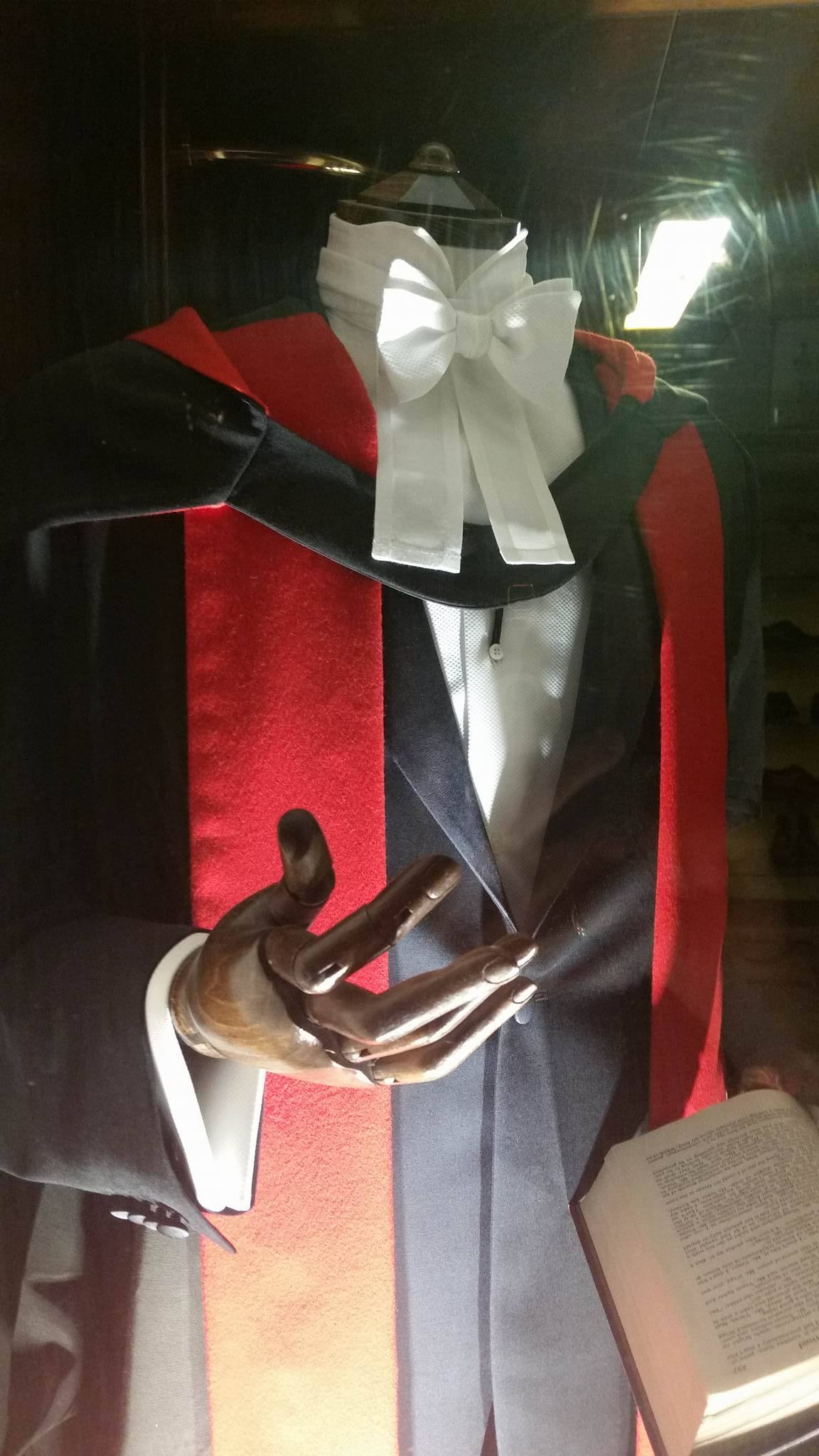
A PhD gown at the University of Cambridge. Reflecting the status of the PhD as a lower doctorate, it uses a black Master's gown with scarlet facings rather than the scarlet Doctor's gown of the higher doctorates at Cambridge.

There is usually a preliminary assessment to remain in the program and the thesis is submitted at the end of a three- to four-year program. These periods are usually extended pro rata for part-time students. With special dispensation, the final date for the thesis can sometimes be extended for additional years, for a total of up to six or seven. For full-time PhDs, a four-year time limit has now been fixed and students must apply for an extension to submit a thesis past this point. Since the early 1990s, British funding councils have adopted a policy of penalising departments where large proportions of students fail to submit their theses in four years after achieving PhD-student status (or pro rata equivalent) by reducing the number of funded places in subsequent years. Inadvertently, this leads to significant pressure on the candidate to minimise the scope of projects with a view on thesis submission, regardless of quality, and discourage time spent on activities that would otherwise further the impact of the research on the community (e.g., publications in high-impact journals, seminars, workshops). Furthermore, supervising staff are encouraged in their career progression to ensure that the PhD students under their supervision finalise the projects in three rather than the four years that the program is permitted to cover. These issues contribute to an overall discrepancy between supervisors and PhD candidates in the priority they assign to the quality and impact of the research contained in a PhD project.

There has recently been an increase in the number of Integrated PhD programs available, such as at the University of Southampton. These courses include a Master of Research (MRes) in the first year, which consists of a taught component as well as laboratory rotation projects. The PhD must then be completed within the next three years. As this includes the MRes all deadlines and timeframes are brought forward to encourage completion of both MRes and PhD within four years from commencement. These programs are designed to provide students with a greater range of skills than a standard PhD, and for the university, they are a means of gaining an extra years' fees from public sources.

==== Other doctorates ====
The University of Oxford abbreviates their Doctor of Philosophy degree "DPhil" (while still using PhD to refer to the degree generically), while other British universities use the standard abbreviation "PhD". These are stylistic conventions, and the degrees are in all other respects equivalent.

In the United Kingdom, PhD degrees are distinct from other doctorates, most notably the higher doctorates such as DLitt (Doctor of Letters) or DSc (Doctor of Science), which may be granted on the recommendation of a committee of examiners on the basis of a substantial portfolio of submitted (and usually published) research. However, some UK universities still maintain the option of submitting a thesis for the award of a higher doctorate.

Recent years have seen the introduction of professional doctorates, which are the same level as PhDs but more specific in their field. Most tend not to be solely academic, but combine academic research, a taught component or a professional qualification. These are most notably in the fields of engineering (EngD), educational psychology (DEdPsych), occupational psychology (DOccPsych), clinical psychology (DClinPsych), health psychology (DHealthPsy), social work (DSW), nursing (DNP), public administration (DPA), business administration (DBA), and music (DMA). A more generic degree also used is DProf or ProfD. These typically have a more formal taught component consisting of smaller research projects, as well as a 40,000–60,000-word thesis component, which together are officially considered equivalent to a PhD degree.

=== United States ===
In the United States, the PhD degree is the highest academic degree awarded by universities in most fields of study. There are more than 282 universities in the United States that award the PhD degree, and those universities vary widely in their criteria for admission, as well as the rigor of their academic programs.

==== Requirements ====
Typically, PhD programs require applicants to have a bachelor's degree in a relevant field, and, in many cases in the humanities, a master's degree, reasonably high grades, several letters of recommendation, relevant academic coursework, a cogent statement of interest in the field of study, and satisfactory performance on a graduate-level exam specified by the respective program (e.g., GRE, GMAT).

==== Duration, age structure, statistics ====
Depending on the specific field of study, completion of a PhD program usually takes four to eight years of study after the bachelor's degree; those students who begin a PhD program with a master's degree may complete their PhD degree a year or two sooner. As PhD programs typically lack the formal structure of undergraduate education, there are significant individual differences in the time taken to complete the degree. Overall, 57% of students who begin a PhD program in the US will complete their degree within ten years, approximately 30% will drop out or be dismissed, and the remaining 13% of students will continue on past ten years.

The median age of PhD recipients in the US is 32 years. While many candidates are awarded their degree in their 20s, 6% of PhD recipients in the US are older than 45 years.

The number of PhD diplomas awarded by US universities has risen nearly every year since 1957, according to data compiled by the US National Science Foundation. In 1957, US universities awarded 8,611 PhD diplomas; 20,403 in 1967; 31,716 in 1977; 32,365 in 1987; 42,538 in 1997; 48,133 in 2007, and 55,006 in 2015.

==== Funding ====
PhD students at US universities typically receive a tuition waiver and some form of annual stipend. Many US PhD students work as teaching assistants or research assistants. Sometimes graduate schools encourage their students to seek outside funding; many are supported by fellowships they obtain for themselves or by their advisers' research grants from government agencies such as the National Science Foundation and the National Institutes of Health. Many Ivy League and other well-endowed universities provide funding for the entire duration of the degree program or for most of it, especially in the forms of tuition waivers/stipends.

=== USSR, Russian Federation and former Soviet Republics ===
==== Candidate of Science degree awarded by the State Higher Attestation Commission ====
In Russia, the degree of Candidate of Sciences (Russian: кандидат наук, Kandidat Nauk) was the first advanced research qualification in the former USSR (it was introduced there in 1934) and some Eastern Bloc countries (Czechoslovakia, Hungary) and is still awarded in some post-Soviet states (Russian Federation, Belarus, and others). According to "Guidelines for the recognition of Russian qualifications in the other European countries," in countries with a two-tier system of doctoral degrees (like Russian Federation, some post-Soviet states, Germany, Poland, Austria and Switzerland), should be considered for recognition at the level of the first doctoral degree, and in countries with only one doctoral degree, the degree of Candidate of Sciences should be considered for recognition as equivalent to this PhD degree.

Since most education systems only have one advanced research qualification granting doctoral degrees or equivalent qualifications (ISCED 2011, par.270), the degree of Candidate of Sciences (Kandidat Nauk) of the former USSR countries is usually considered to be at the same level as the doctorate or PhD degrees of those countries.

According to the Joint Statement by the Permanent Conference of the Ministers for Education and Cultural Affairs of the Länder of the Federal Republic of Germany (Kultusministerkonferenz, KMK), German Rectors' Conference (HRK) and the Ministry of General and Professional Education of the Russian Federation, the degree of Candidate of Sciences is recognised in Germany at the level of the German degree of Doktor and the degree of Doktor Nauk at the level of German Habilitation. The Russian degree of Candidate of Sciences is also officially recognised by the Government of the French Republic as equivalent to French doctorate.

According to the International Standard Classification of Education, for purposes of international educational statistics, Candidate of Sciences belongs to ISCED level 8, or "doctoral or equivalent", together with PhD, DPhil, DLitt, DSc, LLD, Doctorate, or similar. It is mentioned in the Russian version of ISCED 2011 (par.262) on the UNESCO website as an equivalent to PhD belonging to this level. In the same way as PhD degrees awarded in many English-speaking countries, Candidate of Sciences allows its holders to reach the level of the Docent. The second doctorate (or post-doctoral degree) in some post-Soviet states called Doctor of Sciences (Russian: доктор наук, Doktor Nauk) is given as an example of second advanced research qualifications or higher doctorates in ISCED 2011 (par.270) and is similar to Habilitation in Germany, Poland and several other countries. It constitutes a higher qualification compared to PhD as against the European Qualifications Framework (EQF) or Dublin Descriptors.

About 88% of Russian students studying at state universities study at the expense of budget funds. The average stipend in Russia (as of August 2011) is $430 a year ($35/month). The average tuition fee in graduate school is $2,000 per year.

==== PhD degree awarded by university ====
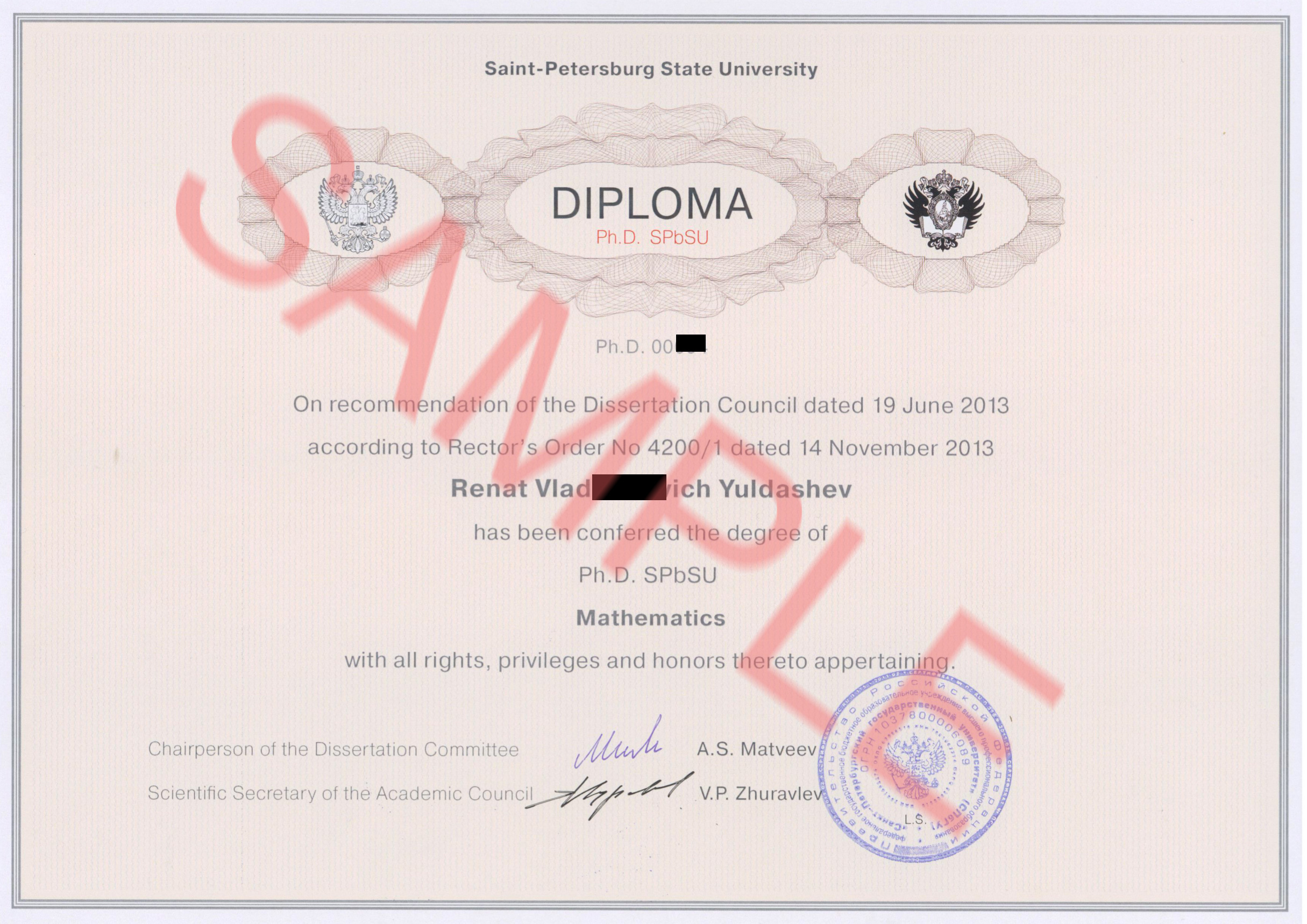
PhD SPbSU certificate

On 19 June 2013, for the first time in the Russian Federation, defenses were held for the PhD degree awarded by universities, instead of the Candidate of Sciences degree awarded by the State Supreme Certification Commission. Renat Yuldashev, the graduate of the Department of Applied Cybernetics of the Faculty of Mathematics and Mechanics of St. Petersburg State University, was the first to defend his thesis in field of mathematics according to new rules for the PhD SPbSU degree.

For the defense procedure in the field of mathematics, it was used the experience of joint Finnish-Russian research and educational program organized in 2007 by the Faculty of Information Technology of the University of Jyväskylä and the Faculty of Mathematics and Mechanics of St. Petersburg State University: co-chairs of the program — N. Kuznetsov, G. Leonov, P. Neittaanmäki, were organizers of the first defenses and co-supervisors of dissertations.

== Models of supervision ==
At some universities, there may be training for those wishing to supervise PhD studies. There is much literature available, such as Delamont, Atkinson, and Parry (1997). Dinham and Scott (2001) have argued that the worldwide growth in research students has been matched by the increase in the number of what they term "how-to" texts for both students and supervisors, citing examples such as Pugh and Phillips (1987). These authors report empirical data on the benefits to a PhD candidate from publishing; students are more likely to publish with adequate encouragement from their supervisors.

Wisker (2005) has reported that research into this field distinguishes two models of supervision: The technical-rationality model of supervision, emphasising technique; and the negotiated order model, which is less mechanistic, emphasising fluid and dynamic change in the PhD process. These two models were first distinguished by Acker, Hill and Black (1994; cited in Wisker, 2005). Considerable literature exists on the expectations that supervisors may have of their students (Phillips & Pugh, 1987) and the expectations that students may have of their supervisors (Phillips & Pugh, 1987; Wilkinson, 2005) in the course of PhD supervision. Similar expectations are implied by the Quality Assurance Agency's Code for Supervision (Quality Assurance Agency, 1999; cited in Wilkinson, 2005).

== PhD in the workforce ==
PhD graduates represent a relatively small, elite group within most countries — around 1.1% of adults among OECD countries. Slovenia, Switzerland and Luxembourg have higher numbers of PhD Graduates per capita as illustrated here. For Slovenia, this is because MSc degrees before Bologna Process are ranked at the same level of education as PhD. Without the MSc, Slovenia has 1.4% PhD graduates, which is comparable to the average in OECD and EU-23 countries.

== International PhD equivalent degrees ==
- Afghanistan: دکتورا
- Albania: Doktorature.(Dr.)
- Algeria: Doctorat, دكتوراه
- Argentina: Doctorado (Dr.)
- Armenia: գիտությունների թեկնածու
- Austria: Doktor (Dr., plural: DDr.)
- Australia: Doctor of Philosophy (PhD)
- Azerbaijan: Fəlsəfə doktoru (Dr.)
- Bangladesh: Doctorate
- Belarus: кандидат наук
- Belgium (Dutch-speaking): Doctor (dr. or PhD)
- Belgium (French-speaking): Doctorat (dr. or PhD)
- Bosnia and Herzegovina: Doktor nauka
- Brazil: Doutorado (DSc)
- Bulgaria: Доктор
- Burma: ပါရဂူ
- Canada: Doctor of Philosophy (PhD)
- China: 博士 (Bó shì)
- Chile: Doctorado
- Colombia: Doctorado
- Costa Rica: PhD or Doctorado (Dr.)
- Croatia: Doktor znanosti (dr. sc.)
- Cuba: Doctorado (DrC)
- Czech Republic: kandidát věd (CSc.) was used until 1998, since 1998 doktor (Ph.D.) is used; doktorát (degree)
- Denmark: Licentiate, Magister, PhD (the doctorates are higher degrees)
- Dominican Republic: Doctorado
- Ecuador: Doctorado
- El Salvador: Doctorado
- Egypt: Doctorat, دكتوراه
- Estonia: Doktor (Dr)
- Ethiopia: ዶክተር, Doctor (PhD, Dr.)
- Finland: Filosofian tohtori and any degree of tohtori
- France: Doctorat
- Georgia: დოქტორი
- Germany: Doktor
- Greece: Διδακτορικό
- Hong Kong: 博士 (Doctor)
- Hungary: Doktor (Dr.)
- India: Doctorate
- Indonesia: Doktor (Dr.)
- Iran: دکتری تخصصی, دکترای تخصصی, Doktor (دکتر), (پی‌اچ‌دی (PhD))
- Iraq: دكتوراه (Duktorah)
- Ireland: an Doctúireacht
- Israel: דוקטורט ("doctorat")
- Italy: Dottorato di ricerca (Dott. Ric. or Ph.D.)
- Japan: 博士 (hakase)
- Jordan: دكتوراه (Doctorah)
- Korea: 박사 (baksa)
- Kuwait: دكتوراه (Dektoraah)
- Kurdistan: دکتۆرا (Doctorah)
- Kyrgyzstan (Илим доктору)
- Latin America: Doctorado/Doctorate
- Latvia: Zinātņu doktors
- Lebanon: دكتوراه (doktorah)
- Lithuania: Daktaras
- Macau: 博士 (Doutoramento)
- North Macedonia: Докторат
- Malaysia: Doktor Falsafah
- Mauritius: Doctor of Philosophy (PhD)
- Mexico: Doctorado
- Mongolia: Эрдэмтэн
- Morocco: Doctorat
- Mozambique: Doutoramento
- Nepal: Doctor
- Netherlands: Doctor (dr. or PhD)
- New Zealand: Doctor of Philosophy (PhD)
- Nigeria: Doctor of Philosophy (PhD)
- Norway: Magister, Licentiate, doctorates (traditionally considered higher degrees), PhD
- Pakistan: Doctor
- Palestine: دكتوراه (doktorah)
- Paraguay: PhD or Doctorado (Dr.)
- Peru: Doctorado
- Philippines: Doktor
- Poland: Doktor
- Portugal: Doutorado
- Romania: Doctorat
- Russia: кандидат наук (PhD), ru: доктор наук (Sc.D.)
- Saudi Arabia: دكتوراه
- Singapore: Doctor
- Serbia: Доктор наука
- Slovakia: Doktor filozofie (PhD)
- Slovenia: Doktor znanosti
- Somalia: Dhaqtarka Falsafada
- South Africa: Doctor of Philosophy (PhD, Doctor)
- Spain: Doctorado
- Sweden: Filosofie doktor (fil.dr., FD)
- Switzerland: Doctorat (Dr)
- Syria: دكتوراه (doktorah)
- Taiwan: 博士 (Mandarin: Bo-shi; Taiwanese: Phok-sū)
- Thailand: ดุษฎีบัณฑิต
- Tunisia: دكتوراه (doktorah)
- Turkey: Doktora
- Uganda: Doctor of Philosophy (PhD)
- United Arab Emirates: دكتوراه (doktorah)
- United Kingdom: Doctor of Philosophy (PhD, doctor, the abbreviation DPhil is used by the University of Oxford)
- United States: Doctor of Philosophy (PhD)
- Ukraine: Доктор філософії (PhD)
- Uruguay: Doctorado
- Uzbekistan: Falsafa doktori (PhD)
- Vatican City State: Doctor of Sacred Theology (STD) or Doctor of Canon Law (JCD)
- Venezuela: Doctorado
- Vietnam: Tiến sỹ
- Yemen: دكتوراه (doktorah)

== See also ==
- History of higher education in the United States
- List of fields of doctoral studies in the United States
- Doctor of Professional Studies
- Piled Higher and Deeper, a comic strip
- Terminal degree
- Doctor of Philosophy by publication
