= South African insurance law =

Regulating the insurance industry

Insurance in South Africa describes a mechanism in that country for the reduction or minimisation of loss, owing to the constant exposure of people and assets to risks (be they natural or financial or personal). The kinds of loss which arise if such risks eventuate may be either patrimonial or non-patrimonial.

A general definition of insurance is supplied in the case of Lake v Reinsurance Corporation Ltd, which describes it as a contract between an insurer and an insured, in terms of which the insurer undertakes to render to the insured a sum of money, or its equivalent, on the occurrence of a specified uncertain event in which the insured has some interest, in return for the payment of a premium.

The law of insurance in South Africa consists of

- rules peculiar to insurance (like the rules on insurable interest, subrogation and double insurance);
- rules applicable to all contracts (like the rules on offer and acceptance, and contracts in favour of third parties); and
- general contractual rules that have undergone changes in the insurance context (like the rules on insurance warranties).

Broadly speaking, the law of insurance in South Africa is concerned with

- the conclusion and consequences of insurance contracts;
- general aspects of law of damages;
- the rules on insurance intermediaries;
- insurance tax law; and
- insurance company or supervision law.

== History ==
Early Roman-Dutch law dealt mainly with marine insurance.

In 1879, the Cape Colony passed the General Law Amendment Act, introducing English law to govern “every suit, action and cause having reference to fire, life and marine insurance” in the Cape. In the Transvaal and Natal, English law was not incorporated by legislation; Roman-Dutch law remained applicable in principle, and was never officially displaced, but the influence of English law was felt also in these regions.

In 1977, the Pre-Union Statute Law Revision Act repealed the Cape General Law Amendment Act. This repeal was interpreted by the Appellate Division, in the leading case on the sources of South African insurance law, Mutual & Federal v Oudtshoorn Municipality, to mean that the Roman-Dutch law of insurance was restored.

South African insurance law is governed mainly by Roman-Dutch law as its common law. Nevertheless, the courts have consistently regarded English law as having strong persuasive authority whenever Roman-Dutch authority is lacking or insufficient. In respect of contracts concluded after the Pre-Union Statute Law Revision Act took effect, English law no longer has any binding authority in any part of South Africa, but it has been argued that, "judging from trade usages prevailing in the South African insurance industry, it may be assumed that the principles of English insurance law are still being adhered to."

== Legislative Framework ==
The following legislation is of special importance to South African insurance law:

- the Long-term Insurance Act;
- the Short-term Insurance Act;
- the Insurance Laws Amendment Act;
- the Financial Services Board Act; and
- the Financial Advisory and Intermediary Services Act.

== Classification of insurance ==
Classification is often merely a matter of convenience, but there may be compelling reasons for it; it may even reflect a difference in underlying legal principles. Various criteria may be applied in classifying contracts of insurance. The most important are

- the nature of the interest insured;
- the nature of the event insured against;
- the way in which the amount recoverable under the contract is determined; and
- the way in which any profits of the insurer are dealt with.

It is possible, and often desirable, for one and the same insurance contract to combine different classes of insurance.

=== Indemnity versus capital insurance ===
The most fundamental distinction between various insurance contracts is that between indemnity insurance and what is usually called non-indemnity insurance, but which is here referred to as "capital insurance."

==== Indemnity insurance ====
In the case of indemnity insurance, the contract between the parties provides that the insurer must indemnify the insured for patrimonial loss suffered as the proximate result of the occurrence of the event insured against. It is uncertain whether the event insured against (like fire or theft, for example) will actually occur, but it obviously must before loss can be quantified.

In the context of indemnity insurance, examples of insurable interests include

- real rights;
- personal rights;
- legal liability; and
- the factual expectation of damage.

The purpose of the contract of indemnity insurance is to restore the insured to his position quo ante. Nothing more than patrimonial indemnity may be recovered, as is illustrated by the rules on over-insurance and double insurance. The insured is not entitled to make a profit out of his loss. It is accordingly said that the principle of indemnity governs indemnity insurance.

==== Capital insurance ====
In the case of capital or non-indemnity insurance, the insurer undertakes to pay to the insured a specified amount, or periodical amounts, upon the happening of the event insured against: for example, R5,000 if the insured dies or loses a limb. This is generally non-patrimonial loss. On the face of it, the contract does not purport to indemnify the insured against patrimonial loss.

According to traditional perceptions, the interests amenable to capital insurance are limited in number. The best examples of insurable interests are the unlimited interest a person has

- in his own life;
- in his health of mind; and
- in his health of body and limbs.

A person may also have a moral or emotional interest in the life, health and body of his spouse.

Capital insurance, then, depends on an event that invariably relates to the person of the insured or a third party.

The types of events which are open to capital insurance are likewise limited in number. Typical events are

- death, including the death of an unborn child;
- the continuation of life;
- birth; and
- accidents causing bodily injury.

Insurance against other events must therefore take the form of indemnity insurance. A contract operating on the person of the insured or third party is not necessarily a contract of capital insurance, however, because it could have been the intention of the parties to conclude a pure contract of indemnity insurance.

In the case of capital insurance, there is certainty that event insured against will occur (whereas in the case of indemnity insurance there is no such certainty), but the timing is uncertain. The amount is determined at time of the issuing of the policy, and is not related to loss suffered.

==== Differences and similarities ====
The difference between indemnity and capital insurance must be taken to lie in the nature of the interest that is the object of the insurance:

- In indemnity insurance, the interest must of necessity be of a patrimonial nature; otherwise no financial loss or damage can be caused through its impairment.
- By contrast, the interest that serves as the object of a capital-insurance contract must be regarded as non-patrimonial in substance.

The law determines which interests may be insured in terms of an indemnity-insurance contract. The same holds good for capital insurance.

Important consequences are attached to the distinction between indemnity and capital insurance. Capital insurers, for example, are not entitled to claim a proportionate contribution by other insurers, or to demand subrogation of the insured's rights in respect of the loss. By the same token, the doctrine of imputation of benefits does not apply to capital insurance.

=== Short- and long-term insurance ===
A distinction between short-term and long-term insurance is embodied in the definitions under the Insurance Acts.

Long-term insurance business means the business of providing policy benefits under defined long-term policies. In terms of section 1 of the Long-term Insurance Act, “long-term policy” means an assistance policy, a disability policy, a fund policy, a health policy, a life policy or a sinking fund policy, or a contract comprising a combination of any of those policies. It also includes a contract whereby any such contract is varied. (See also the definition of “Health Policy” to distinguish from short-term insurance.)

Short-term insurance business refers to the business of providing policy benefits under defined short-term policies. Under the terms of section 1 of the Short-term Insurance Act, “short-term policy” means an engineering policy, a guarantee policy, a liability policy, a miscellaneous policy, a motor policy, an accident and health policy, a property policy or a transportation policy, or a contract comprising a combination of any of those policies. The definition also includes a contract whereby any such contract is renewed or varied.

The division of insurance business into short- and long-term insurance business is for administrative purposes. Most short-term insurance is indemnity insurance, but short-term insurance is not restricted to indemnity insurance, since an "accident and health policy" belongs to the class of capital insurance. Long-term insurance, by the same token, is not confined to capital insurance, because "fund insurance" appears to be a case of indemnity insurance.

"In the final analysis," writes Reinecke, "the real difference between long-term and short-term insurance is not clear."

== Formation of the insurance contract ==
The basis of contractual liability, where the parties to a contract do not misunderstand each other, is consensus ad idem animo contrahendi. In those exceptional cases in which the parties misunderstand each other and only apparent consent exists, liability appears to rest on the reasonable reliance by the contracting party on the existence of consensus. This is known in contract law as the reliance theory. Such consent may be termed “constructive consent.” Of course, there is always room also for the application of the doctrine of estoppel, if a litigant can satisfy its more stringent requirements, and if he wishes to avail himself of this remedy in order to hold a party bound to the appearance of consensus he has created. For a contract as such to exist, however, actual or constructive consent must be achieved. This is brought about by offer and acceptance.

These general principles of the law of contract in South Africa also hold good for contracts of insurance, and must be applied to such contracts.

It is sometimes maintained that a contract of insurance comes into existence as soon as the parties have agreed upon every material term of the contract they wish to make, such as

- the person or property to be insured;
- the event insured against;
- the period of insurance; and
- the amount of the premium.

This suggests that the parties need not agree on terms other than material terms. For their contract to qualify as one of insurance, the parties must agree on the essentials of insurance. If they do not reach specific agreement, there can be no contract of insurance (although another type of contract may come into existence).

For the contract to be valid, however, the parties must in fact agree on every term each of them regards as being a non-severable part of the proposed contract. This requirement is subject only to the ordinary rules creating contractual liability despite the absence of consensus. As a rule, the parties to a contract of insurance do not apply their minds to each specific term; they contract on the basis of the insurer's usual terms for the particular type of risk to be insured against.

The contract of insurance comes into being only when consensus is reached. Until then, the anticipated contract does not provide cover, although the eventual contract may operate retrospectively. Pending the conclusion of their negotiations, the parties often conclude interim insurance to cover the proposer during the period prior to the final decision on the main contract. Interim-insurance cover is provided by means of a contract, and therefore also rests on consensus.

Many facets of insurance business, including the conclusion of contracts, are transacted through insurance agents representing the respective parties. If, during the conclusion of the contract, a party is represented by an agent with authority to enter into the contract on behalf of his principal, the intention and acts of the agent must be taken into consideration in deciding whether a contract has come into existence.

=== Essential elements of an insurance contract ===
In British Oak Insurance v Atmore, the locus classicus, the essentialia of a contract of insurance were enumerated as follows:

- the person or property insured;
- the risk insured against;
- the amount payable by the insurer on the occurrence of the event insured against;
- the premium; and
- the period of the insurance cover.

No specific formalities are required, but the regulations to the Short Term Insurance Act contain certain requirements for the purposes of issuing a policy.

The policy document normally contains the contract.

== Concepts in insurance law ==
=== Proposal ===
In general, insurers do not make binding offers to insure; rather, they invite the public (by invoking the aid of intermediaries or otherwise) to apply for insurance. The actual offer to contract is accordingly made by the proposed insured, almost invariably on a printed form issued by the insurer and completed or signed by the proposer.

As formulated by insurers, this proposal form does not usually leave much room for bargaining between the parties. What bargaining there is usually is confined to matters which cannot be settled in advance, such as the amount of the insurance, the period of insurance and special circumstances relating to the risk. Occasionally the proposed insured may request a deletion or addition: for example, by way of endorsements, to be effected in respect of the insurer's standard form of contract.

The premium is not normally recorded in the proposal form. Most other terms of the proposed contract are also not expressly stated, the intention being to contract on the usual terms of the insurer. In determining the usual terms of the insurer, evidence of other policies issued by the insurer is admissible. Once a reference to the usual terms is included in the contract, the insured actually agrees to them; he cannot afterwards be heard to say that he did not have the opportunity to ascertain the exact content of the terms.

The proposal form invariably contains a series of questions put by the insurer which must be answered to obtain information necessary for calculating the risk. Apart from being a formal offer, the proposal form is therefore also a written record of representations made by the proposer. Generally, the proposer is required

- to warrant the truth of his answers; and
- to accept them as the basis of the proposed contract.

There is a duty of disclosure, in other words.

The proposal is normally incorporated into the formal insurance contract by reference.

Although the above procedure represents the general position, consent may be achieved in any way the parties choose. For example,

- an offer to take out insurance may be made by tendering a premium; or
- an insured may offer to renew an existing contract by paying a premium without completing a fresh proposal form.

If a proposal form submitted to the insurer has not been authorised by the prospective insured, it may not serve as an offer by him. A policy issued by the insurer in response to such an unauthorised offer may, however, itself constitute an offer to be accepted by the proposed insured.

It is also possible that the proposal by the prospective insured is not acceptable to the insurer as it stands, but that the insurer is willing to contract on other terms. In such a case, a counteroffer may be made by the insurer. It may also happen that the insurer makes the offer from the outset, as in the case of coupon insurance or interim insurance.

=== Acceptance ===
Acceptance of an offer is an express or tacit statement of intention in which the offeree signifies his unconditional assent to the offer. In principle, the offeror must be notified of the offeree's decision to accept the offer. The insurer, as offeree, usually accepts the offer by sending to the proposer a policy accompanied by a covering letter which explains that the proposal has been accepted.

Dispatching the policy is in itself sufficient to communicate acceptance. A demand for the premium by the insurer, and, in exceptional circumstances, receipt of the premium, may also operate as an acceptance. A firm acceptance of a proposal may even be contained in an interim cover note, although such a note is generally an acceptance of a proposal for temporary cover only.

=== Policy ===
Contracts of insurance need not be in writing to be valid, but the standard practice is to reduce them to writing. A document expressing the terms of a contract of insurance is called a "policy."

=== Premium ===
A “premium” is primarily a sum of money. According to one Roman-Dutch authority, a premium may also consist in something other than money. If this were indeed the position, "it is rather strange that there was no discussion of the contingency that the premium may be defective."

It has also been suggested, for modern law, that the definition of "premium" should be widened so as to encompass something other than money: "Although there is no objection in principle to the enforceability of such contracts, it is doubtful whether there is any need to bring a contract involving a non-monetary 'premium' under the umbrella of insurance." No judicial preference has as yet been expressed. The term “premium” is defined in insurance legislation, but the definition there does not shed any light on the nature of a premium.

=== Interim insurance ===
It sometimes takes a considerable time to finalise the preliminaries for the conclusion of a contract of insurance. In order to protect the proposed insured during the interval before the issue of a final policy, the parties frequently resort to temporary or interim insurance to cover the proposer immediately but for a limited period of time. This is common practice in the case of short-term insurance contracts, but it may be invoked in all other forms of insurance.

Although limited in duration, interim insurance is nothing less than a fully-fledged contract of insurance. This being so, the proposed insured must observe the usual duty of good faith towards his insurer. Similarly, the contract must comply with all the requirements for the validity of insurance contracts in general.

The contract of interim insurance is separate from and independent of the final contract of insurance following on the conclusion of an interim contract, although it may share some or most of the terms of the final contract. If a claim arises during the currency of the interim contract, it must be considered in terms of the interim contract itself, not in terms of the final contract. This may be of importance where only the final contract, not the interim contract, is voidable because of a misrepresentation or other unlawful conduct, and also where the terms of the two contracts differ.

Granting insurance cover by way of interim insurance does not oblige the insurer to provide permanent cover. By the same token, the person enjoying interim cover is not compelled to accept permanent cover from the insurer merely because he has accepted interim cover.

==== Cover notes ====
The interim insurance contract is usually embodied in a document which is commonly known as a “cover note,” but other expressions--“protection note,” “interim policy,” “temporary policy” and, inappropriately, “interim receipt”—occur as well.

Temporary insurance is sometimes granted in terms of a reminder to renew an existing insurance contract, and can be encountered in various other types of documents. Whether a document recording the terms of an interim contract of insurance may be regarded as the exclusive memorial of such a contract depends on the intention of the parties.

A cover note may not normally be regarded as a “policy” in the ordinary sense of the word. Nonetheless, the definitions of the various “policies” in the Long-term Insurance Act, and in the Short-term Insurance Act, are wide enough to include cover notes and all other like documents recording insurance cover.

== Insurable interest ==
The insured must prove that an insurable interest existed in order to prove loss. The test is whether the insured will incur financial loss, or will fail to derive an anticipated financial benefit, if the event insured against occurs. In principle, the object of insurance must be in existence at the time of the occurrence of the peril insured against. If the insured has no interest at the time of the occurrence of the event insured against, he cannot suffer any loss or damage. Since the function of insurable interest is to determine whether the insured has suffered a loss, the insured's interest, by virtue of the terms of the contract, must exist at the time of the materialisation of the peril insured against. If the insured does not possess an interest at that crucial time, there is no object secured by the insurance. Consequently, the insured can bring no claim under the contract for loss suffered.

If the insured does not have an insurable interest in the object, the contract will be void and unenforceable, and regarded essentially as a gamble or wager. The purpose of the requirement of insurable interest is to distinguish insurance from wagering. The basic principle of insurance is to protect against loss; it is not concerned with the creation of opportunities for speculative gain. In the formative days of insurance law, things were quite different; insurance was in fact often indistinguishable from gambling. Excesses led in the Sixteenth and Seventeenth Centuries to the outright banning of life insurance, for example, in France, the Dutch Republic and Sweden. The more reasonable course, requiring an insurable interest as a prerequisite for the purchase of insurance, was pioneered in England, making insurance more than a mere game of chance, improving the repute of the insurance industry (formerly frowned upon as an aleatory contract), and gaining wider acceptance for it. As we have seen, South Africa formally imported the doctrine of insurable interest from England, but in 1977 the legislature repealed the colonial ordinances which had achieved this. The Appellate Division, in Mutual and Federal v Oudtshoorn Municipality, took their repeal to mean that the Roman-Dutch law of insurance is now the common law for insurance.

"There is no South African statute which lays down the need for a so-called insurable interest," and Roman-Dutch law had no discrete doctrine of insurable interest. It could be said to be implied, however, by the fact that Roman-Dutch law defined a contract of insurance as one which transfers a risk threatening the patrimony of the insured. Roman law also banned wagers.

Whether or not an indirect economic interest is enough to constitute an insurable interest, as opposed to a mere wager, will depend on the facts of each case.

In Littlejohn v Norwich Union Fire Insurance Society, a husband had taken out fire insurance in his own name over the contents of a shop owned by his wife. (They were married out of community of property.) The court found that he had an insurable interest, because he would obviously be in a worse position, in patrimonial terms, after his wife's property was burnt.

In Phillips v General Accident Insurance, the court held that a husband had an insurable interest in his wife's jewellery, even though he was under no obligation to replace it.

In Refrigerated Trucking v Zive NO, the owner of a vehicle was found to have an insurable interest in sustaining insurance for liability incurred by persons who drove his vehicles with his consent.

In Lorcom Thirteen v Zurich Insurance, the bases for Lorcom's insurable interest in the “Buccaneer” fishing vessel were as follows:

- Lorcom was the sole shareholder of the owner of the vessel.
- In terms of a purchase agreement, Lorcom would become the owner on “effective date:” that is, upon full payment.
- Lorcom had the right of use of the vessel.
- Lorcom held the fishing permit.

Below are some further examples of insurable interest:

1. An owner of property has an insurable interest to the full value of that property.
2. A person who has a right to performance has an insurable interest in that claim (to insure against the risk of non-performance).
3. A person who does not own property, but who possesses it in good faith (believing that he is the owner of that property), has an insurable interest to the full value of that property.
4. A person has an insurable interest in restricting increases in liabilities. For example, directors of a company may take out indemnity insurance in respect of the negligent decisions they may make.
5. A person has an unlimited interest in his own life and bodily integrity.
6. An insurer may take out insurance on the life of a spouse for an unlimited amount.
7. Parents and children are allowed to take out insurance on each other's lives, subject to some limitations: no more than R10,000 if the child is under six years old, and no more than R30,000 for children under fourteen.
8. Shareholders, directors and partners are allowed to take out “key-man” insurance on the lives of their co-shareholders or partners, as the case may be.

== Duration of insurance contracts ==
Insurance contracts may endure for a definite or indefinite period. Usually the duration is stipulated in the insurance contract or policy document. The contract may terminate or be cancelled, as the case may be,

- by giving the requisite notice for cancellation;
- upon payment (as in the case of an endowment policy or life insurance);
- in the event of total destruction of property, for which the insurer has paid;
- if the insured exercises an election to renew a contract, thus giving rise to a new contract; and
- if premiums are not paid timeously, in which case the policy will lapse.

== Duty to disclose material facts ==
The doctrine of disclosure is based on the general doctrine of good faith. Usually there is a “declaration” at the end of the proposal form that the answers to the questions in the proposal form are the basis of the policy. The proposer is usually required to warrant the truth of the answers. The proposal is incorporated by reference into the formal policy.

The insurer has a right to avoid liability on the contract if the proposer misrepresents a material fact, or if he fails to disclose a material fact. In other words, a breach of the duty of good faith renders the contract voidable at the instance of the insurer, after he has been notified of the non-disclosure.

Both positive and negative misrepresentation are recognised as grounds for avoiding the insurance contract.

=== Positive misrepresentation ===
To be unlawful or wrongful, the statement which constitutes a positive misrepresentation must be wholly false, or at least inaccurate. Whether a statement is false or inaccurate will, in the final analysis, have to be judged according to the convictions of the community. This is the general criterion for establishing wrongfulness.

If the statement is wholly false and thus completely untrue, the issue is relatively simple. If, for example, a proposer for motor-vehicle insurance states in answer to a question in a proposal form that he has not been involved in an accident during the past three years, whereas in fact he has, the statement is obviously wholly false. The same may be said of a statement in a proposal for fire insurance that the premises to be insured are occupied by a particular person, whereas they are not; or that no proposal for similar insurance has been declined in the past, whereas in fact it has.

The position is not always so straightforward. A statement may, for instance, be inaccurate because it is incomplete and so mislead the other party to the contract by the suppression of a part of the true facts. Thus, in answer to the question of whether or not a proposal or insurance has ever been declined or cancelled, a proposer may state that no proposal has ever been declined, thereby telling the truth, but omitting to say that a contract has been cancelled. This is a substantially inaccurate statement, in spite of the fact that it is literally and completely true as far as the declining of a proposal is concerned.

If, in answer to the question of whether or not proposals have been made to other insurers, a proposer answers, “Yes, to the XYZ Company,” while he has also submitted proposals to a number of other insurance companies, the answer may be said to be partially true but substantially inaccurate. Likewise, a simple and unqualified request for particulars of previous losses, claims or insurance contracts means in principle that all such particulars are to be furnished. A proposer is expected to answer questions not only accurately, but as completely as is reasonable according to the convictions of the community.

=== Negative misrepresentation ===
A negative misrepresentation, or a misrepresentation per omissionem, is a wrongful failure by one of the parties to a contract of insurance to disclose, during the course of the negotiations preceding the contract, certain facts within his knowledge. As a result, the other party is induced to enter into the contract, or to agree to specific terms thereof, whereas he would not have done so had those facts been disclosed. The failure may be accompanied by fault; it may even be completely innocent.

It is the nature of the act or conduct involved which distinguishes this type of misrepresentation from positive misrepresentation. Although it may also by typified as a statement of fact, the act creating the wrong impression is not a positive one; it is negative, in that it fails to remove an existing wrong impression by not disclosing facts which would remove that impression. The failure or omission may take the form of active concealment—that is, it may be intention—or inadvertent non-disclosure, which means that it may be negligent or even innocent.

=== Difference ===
The distinction between a positive misstatement and a negative non-disclosure is not always clearcut. In many instances, the same conduct may qualify as both. A failure to state all the material facts in answer to a question may amount to both a negative and a positive misrepresentation, inasmuch as the incomplete answer may create the impression that all the facts have been furnished.

=== Utmost good faith ===
In modern case law and literature, insurance contracts have been classified as contracts “of the utmost good faith” (contracts uberrimae fidei). In general, contracts of this type have been said to impose a duty on the contracting parties to display the utmost good faith towards one another

- during the course of their negotiations preceding the contract; and also (albeit exceptionally, and in circumstances less clearly defined)
- during the existence of the contract itself.

The duty of utmost good faith (or its companion, an exceptionally high degree of good faith) appears in the case law and literature in connection with contracts which are typified by a relationship of close trust between the contracting parties.

The notion of utmost good faith, and the view that the insurance contract, or for that matter any other contract, may be a contract of the utmost good faith, was rejected in Mutual and Federal v Oudtshoorn Municipality. Acknowledging that the origin of the phrase “uberrima fides” was doubtful, but noting that it apparently made its appearance in English law in 1850, the court was “unable to find any Roman-Dutch authority in support of the proposition that a contract of marine insurance is a contract uberrima fidei”. The court rejected the expression as “alien, vague [and] useless [... and] without any particular meaning in law,” explaining

- that “there is no magic in the expression;”
- that “there are no degrees of good faith;”
- that “it is entirely inconceivable that there could be a little, more or most (utmost) good faith;” and
- that “there is no room for uberrima fides as a third category of faith in our law.”

Despite these remarks, and despite the fact that the House of Lords has subsequently, with reference to them, noted that “the concept of uberrima fides does not appear to have derived from civil law and [that] it has been regarded as unnecessary in civilian systems,” Reinecke observes that "old habits die slowly," and that insurance contracts are still occasionally referred to as "contracts of the utmost good faith." This usage, he urges, "must be deprecated," at least insofar as it suggests that the distinction between utmost good faith and good faith involves a difference of principle rather than merely one of degree.

=== Good faith ===
Contracts of insurance, like all other types of contract, are therefore contracts of good faith. The feature of good faith is not an essential or distinguishing feature of the insurance contract.

Despite rejecting the notion of utmost good faith, the court in M&F v Oudtshoorn did not set out the content of the requirement of good faith as it pertains to insurance contracts. Accordingly, past authority which dealt with the content of the notion of utmost good faith must still be consulted for guidance, while bearing in mind that, in principle, any duty concerned is not a duty of exceptional good faith, but simply one of good faith.

The facts of M&F v Oudtshoorn were these: A light aircraft collided with pole carrying electric power lines just outside the boundary of the Oudtshoorn aerodrome. The owner of the aircraft successfully sued the Municipality for the value of the aircraft. The Municipality tried to recover the amount from its insurers (Mutual and Federal), but the insurers successfully resisted the claim: When the policy had been negotiated, the Municipality had failed to disclose the close proximity of the aerodrome to pole and power lines, which constituted a hazard to aircraft using the aerodrome at night.

The court held that there is a duty on the insured and the insurer to disclose to each other, prior to the conclusion of the contract of insurance, every fact relative and material to the risk or to the assessment of the premium. The duty of disclosure relates to material facts, of which parties had actual or constructive knowledge prior to the conclusion of the contract of insurance. Breach of the duty of disclosure amounts to mala fides or fraud, and the aggrieved party may avoid contract.

=== Materiality test ===
A representation relating to material facts cannot be wrongful. The test for materiality is, in principle, an objective test. In M&F v Oudtshoorn, the Appellate Division formulated it thusly: whether or not, having regard to the circumstances, the undisclosed information is reasonably relevant to the risk, or to the assessment of the premium. In other words, are the facts of such a nature that knowledge of them would, objectively seen, probably influence a represent in deciding whether or not to conclude the contract, and on what terms to do so? The question, then, is a question of the effect of the non-disclosure: Would disclosure influence

- the decision of an insurer to accept a risk;
- the terms of risk acceptance; and
- the amount of the premium?

If the answer is in the affirmative, the undisclosed information or facts are material. The court applies a version of the reasonable-person test: that is, whether a reasonable person would have regarded the particular facts as relevant to the decision of an insurer concerning the assessment and underwriting of the risk. Some decisions use the standard of the reasonable insurer, others the reasonable proposer. Reinecke argues that the two are not incompatible: "A single combined test for materiality would be whether, according to the opinion of a reasonable person in the position of the particular proposer for instance, the facts in point are likely to influence the decision of a reasonable insurer when it comes to assessing the risk."

According to M&F v Oudtshoorn, the "reasonable man test" is applied to determine whether or not, from the point of view of the reasonable man, or of the average prudent person, the undisclosed facts or information is reasonably relative to the risk or the assessment of the premium. The test, then, refers to those facts which are objectively and reasonably related to an insurer's decision when all the circumstances of the case are taken into account.

In terms of section 59(1)(b) of the Long-Term Insurance Act, and section 53(1)(b) of the Short-Term Insurance Act,

The representation or non-disclosure shall be regarded as material if a reasonable, prudent person would consider that the particular information constituting the representation or which was not disclosed, as the case may be, should have been correctly disclosed to the insurer so that the insurer could form its own view as to the effect of such information on the assessment of the relevant risk.

It is, according to the Appellate Division in President Versekeringsmaatskappy v Trust Bank, a matter of perspective. The question is not whether a reasonable person would regard the information as affecting the risk, but whether a reasonable person would have considered that the information should be disclosed so that the insurer could take it into account and come to its own decision concerning the risk.

=== Content of the duty ===
The contract is voidable at the instance of the insurer if the insurer can prove

- that the non-disclosed fact was material;
- that it was within the knowledge of the insured; and
- that it was not communicated to the insurer.

The duty to disclose includes

- answering all questions on the proposal form correctly; and
- disclosing all material facts.

=== Knowledge ===
It has been said that the duty in question "is a duty to disclose, and you cannot disclose what you do not know," and that the "obligation to disclose, therefore, necessarily depends on the knowledge you possess." This implies that the duty imposed is merely to disclose facts already within that party's knowledge; apparently, on this dictum, it does not include an obligation to collect information so as to become able to disclose it.

South African law, however, long appeared to favour the view that only material facts within one's actual or personal knowledge were included in the duty of disclosure. In M&F v Oudtshoorn, however, the court stated in passing that constructive knowledge—that is to say, knowledge which is imputed or presumed—is also included in the duty of disclosure.

Knowledge is constructive, and is imputed to an insured,

- if he ought to have had that knowledge—that is, if he ought to have known of it—in the ordinary course of business;
- if he would have ascertained or acquired that knowledge if he had made such inquiries as a reasonable business person would make; and
- if his employee acquired actual knowledge of facts in the course of his employment, and was under a duty to communicate this knowledge to the insured.

Reinecke considers that "this broad view of the duty of disclosure may arguably extend it unjustifiably and impose an unreasonable burden on the insured."

In Anderson Shipping v Guardian National Insurance, a vehicle owned by Anderson Shipping was involved in an accident with another vehicle, whose owners claimed damages from Anderson Shipping. The driver of Anderson Shipping's vehicle had previously been found guilty of driving under the influence of alcohol. Guardian National Insurance denied liability on the basis that Anderson Shipping had failed to disclose that its procedure for employing drivers did not require applicants to produce their drivers' licenses for inspection.

The question to be answered was whether Anderson Shipping had constructive knowledge of the undisclosed fact. It was argued

- that Anderson Shipping could have ascertained the fact if it had made such enquiries as reasonable business prudence required it to make; and
- that the knowledge of Anderson Shipping's operations manager, who had hired Anderson Shipping's drivers, had to be imputed to Anderson Shipping.

The court rejected both arguments and held

- that ordinary business prudence merely required Anderson Shipping to ascertain whether its system of hiring drivers was working satisfactorily, and that it was not incumbent on Anderson Shipping to carry out a detailed investigation as to the manner in which the system operated; and
- that, although Anderson Shipping's operations manager knew that his system of employing drivers did not require the production of a driver's license in every case, he was merely an agent to employ drivers, and was therefore under no duty to communicate this knowledge to Anderson Shipping.

Although, then, the Appellate Division in Anderson Shipping v General National Insurance refrained from deciding the point, it assumed that an insured (at least, a corporate insured like Anderson Shipping) should be deemed to know every circumstance which, in the ordinary course of business, ought to be known by it.

=== Material facts ===
Information that could affect the insurer's decision—whether or not to enter into the contract of insurance, or to charge a higher premium—may include the following:

- that the subject matter is exposed to a higher degree of danger than normal;
- that the liability of the insurer is greater than normal;
- that the insured may cause harm to occur through his own conduct;
- that the value of the insurer's rights of subrogation would be reduced; and
- that the insured is in financial difficulty and may have trouble paying the insurance premiums.

The insurance record of the proposer may also be salient.

=== Non-material facts ===
Non-material facts include

- any circumstance that reduces the risk;
- any circumstance that is known, or presumed to be known, by the insurer;
- any circumstance that is not necessary to disclose as a result of an express or implied warranty; and
- any circumstances regarding which the insurer has waived its right to disclosure.

In Qilingele v South African Mutual Life, an applicant for life insurance did not want to undergo a medical examination. To avoid it, he applied for three separate life-insurance policies with three insurance companies for small amounts which, when added together, would otherwise have required him to undergo a medical examination. Asked in a proposal form whether any other insurance company was considering offering him life cover, he falsely answered, “No.” The applicant also signed a warranty that he had not made any other application to any other insurer.

The court considered whether the falsehood of the misrepresentation was such that it probably would have affected the assessment of the risk undertaken by the particular insurer. This was done by comparing an assessment of the risk on the basis of facts distorted by the misrepresentation with what the assessment would have been on the facts had they been truly stated. The court found that the disparity would be significant if the insurer, had it known the truth,

- probably would have outright declined to undertake the particular risk; or
- probably would have undertaken the risk on different terms.

In Fine v General Accident Fire & Life Assurance, one question on the proposal form was this: “Has the insurance now proposed been declined in any other office?” The proposer answered, “No”—even though a fire policy over the same property had been issued, and subsequently cancelled, by another insurance company. The statement that the proposed insurance was literally correct, but the insurance company repudiated the claim based on a breach of the duty to disclose material facts. The court held that the cancellation of a previous policy is indeed a material fact that the insured should disclose, since it might well influence the insurer in deciding whether or not it will take the insurance risk, and at what premium.

In Commercial Union v Lotter, the buyer of a luxury motor vehicle did not disclose to the insurer that the vehicle had been stolen from another country. When the vehicle was stolen again, the insurance company repudiated the claim. The court upheld the company's repudiation on the basis that material facts had not been disclosed. The insurance company argued that its right of subrogation was diminished by the fact that the vehicle in question was a stolen vehicle when the insurance policy was taken out: The insured had no title to the vehicle, so the insurance company could not sue a negligent third party, in terms of its right of subrogation, for the full costs of repairing any damage to the vehicle.

In Santam v Van Schalkwyk, a father in Kroonstad lent his son in Florida the deposit for a motor vehicle. The father took out an insurance policy, the car was subsequently stolen, and the insurer repudiated due to father's failure to disclose

- that the vehicle had been bought by the son;
- that the vehicle was used exclusively by the son; and
- that the vehicle was kept in Florida, not in Kroonstad.

The court held that a proposer has a legal duty to disclose to his insurer all facts within his knowledge which a reasonable person would consider material to the assessment of the risk or the premium. On the facts, and in the opinion of a reasonable person, the undisclosed information would have impacted the risk assessment. Expert evidence was led to show that the risk of theft was much greater in Florida than in Kroonstad.

In Mutual & Federal v Da Costa, an insured vehicle was described as a “1991 model Mercedes-Benz 230E”, when in fact it was a built-up vehicle consisting of a combination of a 1998 model Mercedes-Benz 200 and a 1990 model Mercedes-Benz 230. Da Costa claimed indemnification under his insurance policy, but Mutual & Federal argued that it was liable under the policy only for a car that matched the description contained in the policy; the mismatch, according to the insurance company, amounted to a material misrepresentation or non-disclosure.

The SCA found that, without any evidence on materiality, a court could assume that a misstatement of the year of manufacture of a motor vehicle is per se a material misstatement. The SCA did allow for an exception, however: A misstated fact will be taken as a material fact, without any evidence having been led on the point, if the “facts speak for themselves.” The court held that the present dispute was not such a case, and therefore found for Da Costa.

In AA Mutual Life v Singh, the policy in question was a ten-year endowment policy, coupled with life cover. AA advertised the policy as including “free life cover [...] available free of medical evidence [...] no medical questions whatsoever.” AA instructed its brokers to market the policy on this basis, and to sell it to applicants who were actively engaged in their usual occupations and fit enough to lead normal lives. AA's broker told Singh, the insured in casu, that she did not have to disclose anything about her health, and that the proposal form which she signed did not require her to provide medical details. AA subsequently sought to avoid liability on the ground that the insured had failed to disclose that she was suffering from cervical cancer. The court held that AA had waived any right which it had to have the insured's state of health disclosed.

== Warranties ==
Insurance warranties are strict contractual undertakings by the insured

- that, in the case of affirmative warranties, certain representations are accurate;
- that, in the case of promissory warranties, certain duties will be performed.

No particular formal or technical wording is required to establish a warranty. There are, however, a few general requirements. In order to establish that a term in an insurance contract is an insurance warranty, it must be proved

- that the term was intended to form part of the contract (in other words, that it was not a “mere representation”); and
- that the term is in the nature of a strict undertaking, with the debtor agreeing to be bound, come what may.

Both these requirements for an insurance warranty may be reconciled with the requirements laid down by the law of contract for other, non-insurance warranties.

According to English insurance law, a term will qualify as an insurance warranty only if it is a "vital term," entailing a right to cancel. English law in this respect is at variance with the South African law of contract, according to which non-vital terms may also qualify as warranties. Nevertheless, it is the English view that has been received in the South African case law on insurance.

A term may be "vital," first and foremost, because of the importance of its subject matter. If the subject matter of a term in an insurance contract is material to the assessment of the risk, it will be regarded as a vital term, and may, therefore, qualify as a warranty. Breach of a vital term will amount to a serious form of positive malperformance, justifying cancellation of the contract.

=== Affirmative Warranties ===
In the case of affirmative warranties, the insured warrants the truth of a representation relating to the present or the past. Affirmative warranties may be sub-divided into

- warranties of fact;
- warranties of knowledge; and
- warranties of opinion.

Warranties of fact have the effect of warranting that a state of affairs either does or does not exist, irrespective of insured's knowledge thereof.

A warranty of knowledge is a guarantee that, to the insured's knowledge, a state of affairs does or does not exist. Forgetfulness would not necessary excuse the insured; he must apply his mind.

Warranties of opinion should be distinguished from warranties of fact and knowledge. In the case of warranties of opinion, the insured provides estimates or other information typical of an opinion. Where a proposer for insurance in respect of a stack of hay stated that the stack was estimated to yield a certain quantity of wheat and chaff, and warranted his answers, the court held that he did not warrant that the stack would in fact yield the quantities stated, and that the insured did not commit a breach of warranty if his estimate was fair and reasonable. The insured, in other words, did not warrant the existence of certain facts, or his knowledge concerning such facts; he gave a warranty only in respect of his opinion.

It is not always easy to determine whether a warranty relates to a state of affairs (and thus to a fact), or to the insured's opinion about certain matters. Ultimately, it depends on how the question is construed. A tendency identified on the part of English courts has been to treat questions apparently eliciting the insured's opinion as demanding statements of fact; the same appears true of local decisions.

=== Promissory warranties ===
Promissory warranties are also known (more correctly, since all warranties are promissory, involving as they do a promise or obligation to perform) as “continuing warranties.” They are undertakings by the insured pertaining to his future conduct during the period of the insurance policy. In Cole v Bloom, the insurer avoided liability in respect of a policy containing a promissory warranty that all doors, windows and roofs of a salesman's vehicle (used to convey samples) would be closed and locked when the vehicle was left unattended.the courts apply the strict approach when it comes to promissory warranties as they are not governed by the statute of Insurance Act.

=== Breach of warranties ===
Breach of a warranty amounts to breach of contract. The burden of proof lies with the insurer. Breach of warranty is irreversible; it cannot be undone by subsequent conduct. It is important to distinguish between relative and absolute warranties. This amounts to an issue of interpretation.

=== Relative warranties ===
Relative warranties are general in their content; they are not specific statements of what is required of the insured. The “reasonable person” is used as a yardstick to measure the insured's conduct in relation to an alleged breach of warranty. An example of a general warranty is the "iron-safe clause", which is frequently included in fire-insurance policies. In terms of an iron-safe clause, the insured warrants that he will keep a complete set of books, showing a true and accurate record of all business transactions and stock-in-hand, and that the books will be locked in a fire-proof safe or removed to another building at night and at all times when the premises are not open for business. In Kliptown Clothing v Marine & Trade Insurance the plaintiff, a retail general dealer, obtained a burglary policy from the defendant. Subsequently, the plaintiff suffered burglaries. In an action claiming a declaration that the defendant was obliged to make good the loss, Marine & Trade Insurance pleaded breach by the plaintiff of a warranty

that the insured keeps, and during the whole of the currency of the policy shall keep, a complete set of books, accounts and stock sheets or stock books, showing a true and accurate record of all business transactions and stock in hand, and that such books, accounts and stock sheets or stock books shall be locked in a fire-proof safe or removed to another building at night and at all times when the premises are not actually open for business.

Marine & Trade Insurance alleged

- that there was no (or alternatively no complete or accurate) record of the articles or goods sold by the plaintiff, or of the cost thereof;
- that the plaintiff had failed to keep stock sheets or stock books showing a true and accurate record of stock in hand; and
- that the plaintiff had failed to keep a true or accurate record of all business transactions.

The Appellate Division held that the warranty meant

- that the insured had guaranteed that his practice was, and would continue to be, to keep a complete set of books, annual accounts and annual stock sheets or stock books;
- that he was not obliged, because of the insurance, to bring into existence such books, etc., at any earlier date or in any different form, whether in respect of contemporaneity or in respect of the details recorded, than was required by proper accountancy practice; and
- that he was not obliged to keep, in a safe or at all, any records other than those expressly mentioned in the warranty.

As the defendant had failed to prove either a general breach of the warranty arising out of what the plaintiff had failed to keep in a safe, or a particular breach based on the recording in the books of the purchase of certain articles, the court found for the plaintiff.

=== Absolute warranties ===
Absolute warranties provide a specific or express indication of what is required of the insured, who must comply exactly; if he does not, breach of the warranty will occur. “Substantial performance” is not enough; there must be exact performance. In Jordan v New Zealand Insurance, for example, the plaintiff had stated, in the proposal form for the insurance of a motor car, his age at his next birthday as twenty-two, when in fact it would be twenty-three. The court held that there was no room for the contention that the incorrectness of the answer was not material; nor was there any room for the application of the doctrine of "substantial performance" in considering the truthfulness or otherwise of the answers.

=== Insured’s defences against breach of warranty ===
The insured may have the following defences against a claim that he has breached a warranty:

- The insurer may have waived compliance with the warranty.
- The insurer may be estopped from relying on breach of warranty.
- There may have been a change in circumstances that has the effect that the warranty is no longer relevant or applicable.
- The warranty may not be lawful.

=== Remedies for breach of warranty ===
In principle, the same remedies exist for breach of warranty as exist for breach of any contract. One must, however, distinguish the effects of breach of warranty from those of breach of contract through misrepresentation:

- Cancellation of the contract on the basis of a breach of warranty does not render the entire contract a nullity. Depending on divisibility, cancellation merely extinguishes a vested claim of the insured, or even the insurer's basic obligation to indemnify the insured. Accordingly, the insurer may still rely on terms unaffected by the cancellation: an arbitration clause, for example.
- In the case of a reliance on misrepresentation, on the other hand, the insurer avoids entire contract, and accordingly cannot rely on any of its terms.

=== Problems ===
The strict common-law approach, which requires exact performance of an undertaking that has not necessarily been established as a “material” aspect of the contract (and risk assessment), and entitles the insurer to cancel a contract on the basis of a breach of warranty despite the fact that the representation complained of concerns an immaterial inaccuracy, or a matter with no bearing at all on the risk insured against, has led to absurd results in some cases. Jordan v New Zealand, discussed above, is one such example: Jordan stated that his age at his next birthday would be twenty-two, whereas in fact it would be twenty-three. Since this statement was warranted, the insurer was entitled to repudiate liability, in spite of what most would regard as the immateriality of the inaccuracy, and where, in fact, it "was actually to the advantage of the insurer."

=== Statutory Curtailment ===
As a result of such absurd results, and the potential for more, statutory reform introduced certain curtailments regarding remedies for breach of warranties. Section 63 of the Insurance Act (the governing legislation at the time) was amended in 1969. The effect of the amendment was that the insurer was not permitted to set aside a contract on the grounds of breach of an affirmative warranty unless the insurer could prove that the correctness of the statement (or representation or warranty) was material to the assessment of the risk at the time the policy was issued or renewed. The purpose of the amendment was to protect the insured against repudiations by insurers based on inconsequential inaccuracies or trivial misstatements in insurance proposal forms, even if they were warranted to be true.

In 1989, the Insurance Act of 1943 was repealed. Its section 63(3) was re-enacted, without any amendment as to substance, in section 59(1)(a) of the Long-term Insurance Act and section 53(1)(a) of the Short-term Insurance Act, which provided

- that the policy shall not be invalidated;
- that the obligation of the long-term insurer shall not be excluded or limited; and
- that the obligations of the policyholder shall not be increased,

on account of any representation or failure to disclose information made to the insurer which is not true, whether or not the representation or disclosure has been warranted to be true and correct, unless that representation or non-disclosure is such as to be likely to have materially affected the assessment of the risk under the policy concerned at the time of its issue or at the time of any renewal or variation thereof.

==== Intention of the legislature ====
The Act tries to prevent insurers from exploiting warranties made by the insured in order to avoid paying out on claims. The Act is intended to ensure that an insurer will have no remedy on account of an immaterial incorrect representation, whether that representation was warranted or not.

==== Effect of the statutory reform ====
The insurer is now still liable to pay out on a claim if the breach of warranty relates only to inconsequential inaccuracies. The insurer is not liable, however, if the breach of warranty relates to facts that are material to the risk. The test for misrepresentation will apply:

- For misrepresentation by omission, the assessment of the risk is based on the objective standard of the "reasonable person."
- For misrepresentation by commission, or positive misrepresentation, the assessment of the risk is based on the subjective standard of the particular insurer.

==== Scope of the amendments ====
Instead of “warranties”, the Acts use the expressions “representations,” “non-disclosure” and “failure to disclose”. The meaning of these words is important:

- A “representation” is a statement, made to the insurer, before the contract is entered into. It is not a term of the contract; it does not become part of the contract.
- “Non-disclosure” or “failure to disclose” is also a pre-contractual omission to provide information.

If, then, the warranty is not based on a “representation”, or “failure to disclose” or “non-disclosure”, the insurer will still be able to avoid liability under the contract.

As a general rule, the words “representation”, “failure to disclose” and “non-disclosure” refer to existing facts as well as to future events.

The controversy of granting damages for misrepresentation of a future event has generally been removed by statutory reform. The question of materiality is of assistance here.

== Subrogation ==
Subrogation is the right of the insurer, having indemnified the insured in terms of the policy, to receive the benefit of all the rights of the insured against third parties. The insurer may take charge of litigation against third parties liable for loss to the insured. The proceedings are in the name of the insured, with the insurer as dominus litis. Subrogation, then, is essentially a right of recourse without transfer of rights.

The objectives of subrogation are as follows:

- to prevent the insured from receiving double satisfaction (that is, from recovering both from the insurance company and from a third party in respect of the same loss); and
- to enable the insurance company to recoup what was paid out to the insured. By affording the insurer a right of redress, the cost of insurance to the public is kept down, since the insurer may recoup its loss from a source other than premium income. This, indeed, is the main purpose of subrogation.
- to make sure the 3rd negligent party does not go scott-free.

=== Requirements ===
The following are the requirements of subrogation:

- A valid insurance contract must be in existence.
- The insurer must have indemnified the insured.
- The loss of the insured must have been fully compensated by the insurer.
- The right must be capable of being subrogated.

=== Rights of the insurer ===
The insurer has a right of recourse against a third party for loss where the insurer has paid the insured the cover for such loss. The insurer may institute a claim against the third party on behalf of the insured as dominus litis.

The insurer also has a right to information and assistance from the insured, together with a right to preservation of the claim, which usually takes the form of a clause in insurance contracts which requires the insured to take the necessary steps to protect the insurer's right to subrogation (even if the requirements for subrogation have not yet been met in full).

In Commercial Union v Lotter, the court held that the fact that the insured vehicle was a stolen vehicle compromised the appellant's right of subrogation. Having satisfied the claim of the insured, the insurer was entitled to be placed in the insured's position in respect of all rights and remedies against other parties which were vested in the insured in relation to the subject-matter of the insurance. In a case such as the present, however, where the insured vehicle was a stolen one, an action instituted by Commercial Union (against a negligent third party who had damaged the vehicle) could be successfully resisted on the basis that Lotter (and thus Commercial Union under its right of subrogation) had no title in the vehicle.

=== Difference between subrogation and cession ===
Subrogation allows the insured to retain his personal right. This is not the case with cession, which involves a transfer of the right in terms of an actual agreement.

The effect of this difference or distinction is that, if the insured waives his right to claim against a third-party wrongdoer, the insurer would not be able to claim against the wrongdoer, as the latter is absolved of duty to pay. With cession, in contrast, the insurer acquires all of the rights of the insured to proceed against the third party, and has to sue in its own name.

== Reinstatement ==
If a reinstatement clause exists, and if loss occurs, the insurer has the option either

- of indemnifying the insured in money; or
- of replacing or repairing the damaged property. This is what is known as "reinstatement".

This election lies entirely with the insurer; the insured has no say in the matter. If the insurer elects reinstatement, it has the further option either

- of replacement of the object with a similar object; or
- of restoration of the object to its condition before accident or risk occurred. If the insurer elects to restore an object, it would appear also to have the right to choose who will undertake the restoration or repairs.

When the insurer decides to reinstate, it must notify the insured, after which the election is binding; the insurer may not thereafter change its mind. Notice is to be given within the time allowed by the contract, or within a reasonable time:

- If notice is not given in terms of the contract, or within a reasonable time, the insurer must indemnify the insured with money.
- If notice is given, but the insurer is in mora (i.e. has delayed), the insurer is in breach of its duty to reinstate, and therefore in breach of contract (as debtor). The usual contractual remedies apply.

The insured has a duty to cooperate with the insurer in order to effect the reinstatement. Failure to cooperate would amount to breach of contract (as creditor).

Reinstatement may therefore be described as "direct compensation", because the purpose of reinstatement is to put the insured in the same or similar position as before the loss occurred.

== Reinsurance ==
One insurance company may purchase insurance from another insurance company for the purposes of risk management. Reinsurance has the effect of transferring the risk—that is to say, the "insured risk"—from the insurer to the reinsurer. This allows the insurer to increase its policy limits, taking on a higher risk, since the risk is partly carried by the reinsurer.

The two main categories of reinsurance arrangements are

1. facultative reinsurance; and
2. treaty reinsurance.

Within these two categories, furthermore, there are two main kinds of coverage:

1. proportional reinsurance; and
2. non-proportional reinsurance.

Both facultative and treaty reinsurance can be written on a proportional or non-proportional basis. Both these bases occur in a variety of often highly involved permutations.

=== Facultative reinsurance ===
Facultative reinsurance is the reinsurance of a particular risk under a single policy (for a single or specific risk). It is facultative in the sense that the reinsurer has the choice to accept or reject the particular risk in question. This type of reinsurance arrangement is "cumbersome," writes Reinecke, because a separate negotiation is required for each separate risk which an insurer wishes to pass on to a reinsurer.

=== Treaty reinsurance ===
Treaty reinsurance is an arrangement between the insurer and the reinsurer in terms of which the latter agrees to take over all or part of the former's risk of a particular class or description for a specified period of time.

=== Proportional reinsurance ===
Proportional reinsurance, which may arise in both facultative and treaty reinsurance, refers to a pro rata sharing of risks and losses, and premiums and income, between the primary insurer and the reinsurer.

=== Non-proportional reinsurance ===
In the case of non-proportional reinsurance (or "excess" reinsurance), the reinsurer bears that part of insurer's loss which exceeds an agreed threshold, while the insurer retains the risk or loss below the threshold, or else reinsures this with a different reinsurer.

=== Terms and benefit details ===
In respect of the terms and benefit details contained in the reinsurance agreement, the same principles apply as for ordinary insurance contracts.

=== Retrocession ===
Reinsurance companies may also themselves purchase reinsurance. This is known as "retrocession". The "retrocessionair" grants reinsurance to the "retrocedent".

== Under-insurance ==
Under-insurance occurs where the sum insured is less than the amount of the loss that the insured would suffer if the risk should materialise. For example, a house is insured for R100,000, but its market value is R150,000. A person in such circumstances may only recover loss

- that is actually suffered; and
- up to the sum that is insured.

== Over-insurance ==
Over-insurance occurs when the sum insured is greater than the loss that the insured would suffer if the risk materialises. For example, a house is insured for R200,000, but the cost to rebuild I would be R150,000. Even here, the insured may not recover more than the loss he actually suffers.

== Double Insurance ==
It is possible to insure the same interest against the same risk with two or more insurers. Double insurance does not amount to over-insurance, unless the total of all the insurances is more than the total value of the interest.

If loss occurs, the insured may choose to recover his entire loss from one insurer, or a proportionate share from each insurer, as long as the total amount claimed is not greater than the loss actually suffered.

=== Contribution ===
Most policies have a “contribution clause,” which means that, if an insurer pays more than its proportionate share to the insured, the insurer has a right to reclaim a contribution from the other insurers. This is because the insurer has the right to pay only its proportionate share of the loss.

Insurance contracts often contain clauses to the effect that the insured must disclose other existing or subsequent policies. In the absence of such a clause, the insured is under no obligation to disclose policies that he may have with other insurance companies.

==== Requirements ====
The following are the requirements for the insurer's right to contribution:

- The insurer claiming contribution must have discharged its liability to the insured.
- The insurer claiming contribution must have paid more than its proportionate share of the loss. This applies both to total and to partial loss.
- Payment by the insurer claiming contribution must have been in respect of an interest which was the object of double-insurance at the time of the loss.

==== Determining proportionate loss ====
Where the insurance contracts in a situation of double insurance are virtually identical in all material respects (including the amount insured), loss is to be apportioned equally between the insurers.

Where the contracts differ only as to the amounts insured, all the amounts must be added up and compared with the amount of the loss. Each insurer is then liable for such a proportion of the loss as the amount underwritten by it bears to the aggregate amount insured by all the contracts.

Where the contracts differ substantially, there may be complications. One contract may, for example, insure the common object amongst other objects, without apportioning to it a specific amount. Average clauses may also be present.

The law is silent on the rules governing the apportionment of loss. In practice, negotiation between the parties is necessary.

== Prescription of Claims ==
In general, civil claims prescribe after three years from when the debt arose.

Most policies contain time-bar clauses, requiring the insured to claim within a fixed period of time after the loss insured against has occurred. If an insurer repudiates liability for a claim, the insured has a specific time period within which to issue summons against the insurer, failing which the insurer will be released from liability: that is to say, the claim against the insurer will prescribe.

The purpose of time-bar clauses is to provide legal certainty for the insurer. An insurer has an interest in knowing, within a reasonable time after repudiating a claim, whether it will face litigation or not.

In Barkhuizen v Napier, a short-term insurance policy contained a time-bar clause to the effect that the insurer would not be liable under a claim unless summons was served within ninety days of repudiation of the claim. Summons was served two years after the claim was rejected by the insurer. The Constitutional Court upheld the time-bar clause, but opened the door for these clauses to be scrutinised in future on the basis that they could unfairly discriminate against the insured's right of access to the courts.

“Fairness, justice and reasonableness” is the yardstick by which to determine whether or not a contractual term (including a time-bar clause) should be upheld if such term infringes a constitutional right. In Bredenkamp v Standard Bank, for example, the Supreme Court of Appeal was confronted with a clause in a contract between banker and client entitling the banker unilaterally to cancel the contract for no cause at all, and without hearing the client. The banker subsequently cancelled the contract on the ground that the client posed a risk to the bank's reputation. The court found, relying on Barkhuizen, that the question of the fairness of exercising contractual rights does not arise when it involves no public-policy considerations or constitutional values. The cancellation was therefore not unfair, and the clause was enforceable.

Furthermore, the court in Barkhuizen held that consideration must be given to those special circumstances when a time-bar clause cannot be complied with by the insured.

== See also ==
- Insurance
- South African law
