= Short rate =

Short rate may refer to:

- Short rate cancellation (insurance), a penalty method of calculating return premium of an insurance policy
- Short rate table, used to calculate the earned premium for such a policy
- Short-rate model (interest), a mathematical model that describes the future evolution of interest rates by describing the future evolution of the short rate
