= Huda al-Attas =

Yemeni journalist and author

Huda al-Attas (هدى العطاس) is a Yemeni journalist and author.

== Biography ==
She was born in 1971 in Dawʿan in the Hadhramaut. She is best known for her short stories, for which she has won a number of awards, including the Al-Afif prize in 1997. Her first collection of stories hājis rūḥ wa hājis jasad was published in Aden in 1995. Since then she has published two more collections.

In addition to her short stories, Huda is also a regular writer of columns and articles in Yemeni newspapers, many of them focusing on women's issues. She has worked in the arts faculty at the University of Aden. In 2001, she was elected to the governing body of the Yemeni Writers' Union, alongside fellow female author Ibtisam al-Mutawakkil.

Huda is a representative of the Southern Movement (Al-Hirak) in Arabic) and a leading figure in the south calling for justice and demanding government of Yemen to address southern grievances and the right for self determination.

Huda's work has been translated into Italian and two of her stories appeared in a 2009 anthology of contemporary Yemeni writing entitled Perle dello Yemen.
