= Al-Attas =

Attas or al-Attas or Alatas may refer to:

- Ali Alatas, former Foreign Minister of Indonesia
- Haidar Abu Bakr al-Attas, Prime Minister of Yemen
- Syed Muhammad Naquib al-Attas, Muslim scholar
- Syed Hussein Alatas, Malaysian academic, sociologist and politician and the older brother of Syed Muhammad Naquib al-Attas
- Syed Farid al-Attas, Malaysian sociologist and the son of Syed Hussein Alatas
- Hamida al-Attas, mother of Osama bin Laden
- Jai Al-Attas, co-founder and co-owner of Australian independent label Below Par Records
- Huda al-Attas, Yemeni journalist and author
- Hamid al-Attas, Indonesian Streamer and Food Critic
