= Barkhuizen v Napier =

South African legal case

- Court: Constitutional Court of South Africa
- Full case name: Barkhuizen v Napier
- Decided: 4 April 2007
- Docket nos.: CCT 72/05
- Citations: [2007] ZACC 5; 2007 (5) SA 323 (CC); 2007 (7) BCLR 691 (CC)

Case history
- Prior action: Napier v Barkhuizen [2005] ZASCA 119 in the Supreme Court of Appeal

Court membership
- Judges sitting: Langa CJ, Moseneke DCJ, Madala J, Mokgoro J, Ngcobo J, Nkabinde J, O'Regan J, Sachs J, Skweyiya J, van der Westhuizen J and Yacoob J

Case opinions
- Decision by: Ngcobo J (Madala J, Nkabinde J, Skweyiya J, van der Westhuizen J and Yacoob J concurring)
- Concur/dissent: O'Regan J Langa CJ
- Dissent: Sachs J Moseneke DCJ (Mokgoro J concurring)

Keywords
- Application of Constitution to law of contract; insurance law; time bar clause

Barkhuizen v Napier is an important case in South African contract law. It was heard in the Constitutional Court of South Africa on 4 May 2006 and decided on 4 April 2007. The judges were Chief Justice Pius Langa, Deputy Chief Justice Dikgang Moseneke, and Justices Tholie Madala, Yvonne Mokgoro, Sandile Ngcobo, Bess Nkabinde, Kate O'Regan, Albie Sachs, Thembile Skweyiya, Johann van der Westhuizen, and Zak Yacoob.

== Facts ==
When the applicant (the insured) instituted action in the High Court against the respondent (the insurer) on a short-term insurance contract, the insurer raised a special plea that it had been released from liability under the contract, since the applicant had failed to institute the action within the time period specified in the contract, namely ninety days from the date of repudiation of the claim. The applicant replicated that the time-limitation clause was unconstitutional and unenforceable because it violated his right under the Constitution to have the matter determined by a court.

The High Court upheld the applicant's contention, declaring the time-limitation clause to be inconsistent with the Constitution and dismissing the special plea. However, on appeal, the Supreme Court of Appeal held that section 34 of the Constitution did not prevent time-bar provisions in contracts that were entered into freely and voluntarily, but that it could not be determined on the evidence whether the clause under consideration had been entered into freely and voluntarily. The SCA accordingly upheld the appeal (and the special plea).

The applicant then approached the Constitutional Court for leave to appeal against the decision of the Supreme Court. Before the Constitutional Court, the respondent contended inter alia that the provisions of section 34 had no application to constitutional challenges to contractual terms.

== Judgment ==
The Constitutional Court held that public policy has to be determined with reference to the Constitution, so that a contractual term which violates the Constitution is by definition contrary to public policy and therefore unenforceable. The proper approach to constitutional challenges to contractual terms is to determine whether the term challenged is contrary to public policy as evidenced by South Africa's constitutional values, in particular those found in the Bill of Rights. Section 34, therefore, not only reflected the foundational values that underlie the constitutional order, but also constituted public policy. The court determined that the proper approach to the present matter was to determine whether the time-limitation clause violated section 34 of the Constitution and was thus contrary to public policy.

As a matter of public policy, the court held

1. that, subject to considerations of reasonableness and fairness, time-limitation clauses in contracts are permissible; and
2. that the right to seek judicial redress (as guaranteed by section 34) may be limited in circumstances where
  1. it is sanctioned by a law of general application; and
  2. the limitation is reasonable and justifiable.

It approved the words of Judge of Appeal Edwin Cameron that,

the courts will invalidate agreements offensive to public policy, and will refuse to enforce agreements that seek to achieve objects offensive to public policy. Crucially, in this calculus 'public policy' now derives from the founding constitutional values of human dignity, the achievement of equality and the advancement of human rights and freedoms, non-racialism and non-sexism.

While it is therefore necessary to recognise the doctrine of pacta sunt servanda, the courts may decline the enforcement of a time-limitation clause if its implementation would result in unfairness or would be unreasonable for being contrary to public policy.

The test for reasonableness, the court found, was whether or not the clause afforded the claimant an adequate and fair opportunity to seek judicial redress. If a contractual term provides only for an impossibly short time for the dispute to be referred to a court of law, it is contrary to public policy and unenforceable.

As to the requirement of fairness, the court laid out a two-part test:

1. whether the clause itself is unreasonable; and, if not,
2. whether it should be enforced in light of the circumstances that prevent compliance.

The first part entails a weighing-up of the principle of pacta sunt servanda and the right of all persons to seek judicial redress. The second part entails proof by the claimant that he has good reason for his non-compliance with the time-limitation clause. In that regard, the relative equality or inequality of the bargaining positions of the parties is a relevant consideration.

In the present case,

1. the ninety-day time limitation was not manifestly unreasonable;
2. nor was it manifestly unfair: There was no evidence that the contract had not been freely concluded between parties in equal bargaining positions or that the clause was not drawn to the applicant's attention. In the circumstances, enforcement of the clause would not be contrary to public policy.

The difficulty in the present case was that the applicant had not furnished the reasons for his non-compliance with the time-limitation clause. Without those facts, the court was unable to say whether the enforcement of the clause against the applicant would be unfair and therefore contrary to public policy. The Court was compelled to conclude, then, that enforcement of the clause would not be unjust to the applicant. It followed that the special plea was well taken. The appeal was dismissed.

== See also ==
- South African contract law
