= ATAŞ oil terminal =

Former oil refinery

ATAŞ, short for "Anadolu Tasfiyehanesi Anonim Şirketi" (literally: Anatolian Refinery Joint-stock Company), is a former oil refinery company in Mersin, southern Turkey. Currently, the facility is used as an oil storage and terminal.

== Oil refinery ==
ATAŞ was established in 1958 following a special agreement between the Turkish government and the foreign oil companies Mobil, Royal Dutch Shell, BP and Caltex. Caltex later sold its share to Mobil. Currently, the main shareholder is Petrol Ofisi A.Ş with 68%. Other partners are Shell & Turcas Petrol (27%) and Turcas (5%).

The refinery was built by the Swiss contractor Foster Wheeler AG. It was put into operation on 30 April 1962. The company's headquarters as well as its facilities are located in Akdeniz district of Mersin at 36°49′50″N 34°41′51″E. to the east of the city center. Its annual production was 3.2 million tonnes. On 7 June 2004, ATAŞ gave up refining crude oil. With the shutdown of the refinery after 42-year of production, households and industry facilities in 24 provinces of the Mediterranean and Southeastern Anatolia regions faced fuel oil shortage. Temporary supply from the 485 km (301 mi) far away Tüpraş Kırıkkale Oil Refinery caused an increase in oil prices around 11%.

== Oil terminal ==
The facility was converted after investments into a large-scale storage and terminal for fuel oil, diesel oil and gasoline. It underwent a renovation between 2004 and 2006 carried out by Foster Wheeler, the original contractor in the 1960s. The terminal on the Mediterranean Sea coast is suitable for docking of high-capacity tankers. The storage capacity of ATAŞ terminal is 570,000 m^{3} (20,000,000 cu ft).

Beginning in 2015, the municipality of Akdeniz ilçe (district) has been making efforts to convert the campus of ATAŞ Terminal, which boast over 30 ha (74 acres) and became inactive after the closure of the refinery, into a public park for social and cultural events by preserving its historical characteristic.
