= Ibtisam al-Mutawakkil =

Yemeni poet (born 1970)

Ibtisam al-Mutawakkil (born 1970) is a Yemeni poet born in Sana'a. She is best known for her 1998 poetry collection Shadha al-jamr (The Scent of Embers). She pursued postgraduate studies in Arabic language and literature at Sana'a University and in Morocco. In 2008, she taught Arabic literature at Sana'a University.
