= Pro rata =

Latin phrase meaning "in proportion"

Pro rata is an adverb or adjective meaning in equal portions or in proportion. The term is used in many legal and economic contexts. The hyphenated spelling pro-rata for the adjective form is common, as recommended for adjectives by some English-language style guides. In American English, this term has been vernacularized as prorated or pro-rated.

== Meanings ==
More specifically, pro rata means:

- In proportionality to some factor that can be exactly calculated
- To count based on an amount of time that has passed out of the total time
- Proportional ratio

Pro rata has a Latin etymology, from pro, according to, for, or by, and rata, feminine ablative of calculated (rate or change).

== Examples ==
When liability for a toxic tort or a defective product concerns many manufacturers, the liability under tort law is allocated pro rata. Examples in law and economics include the following, noted below:

=== Partnership liability ===
Each of several partners "is liable for [her or his] own share or proportion only, they are said to be bound pro rata. An example ... may be found in the liability of partners; each is liable ... only pro rata in relation to between themselves."

=== Bankruptcy law ===
When a debtor files for bankruptcy, and "the debtor is insolvent, creditors generally agree to accept a pro rata share of what is owed to them. If the debtor has any remaining funds, the money is divided proportionately among the creditors, according to the amount of the individual debts." "A creditor of an insolvent estate is to be paid pro rata with creditors of the same class."

=== Worker's pay and benefits ===
A worker's part-time work, overtime pay, and Annual leave time are typically calculated on a pro rata basis.

Under US Federal regulations, a government worker has the right such that: "When an employee's service is interrupted by a non-leave earning period, leave is earned on a pro rata basis for each fractional pay period that occurs within the continuity of employment."

The American Federation of Teachers (AFT), a US labor union, argues that all part-time or adjunct instructors should get pro-rata pay for teaching college courses. This is an important issue, as of 2010, for part-time faculty.

Irish secondary school teachers are entitled to pro rata pay for part-time work.

Under British employment law, "Regulations state that, where appropriate, the pro rata principle should be applied to any comparison ... to be given ... holiday."

Likewise, in Tasmania, Australia, the law clearly grants workers the privilege of part-time benefits for leave of absence. This is granted under the Long Service Leave Act 1976.

=== Investment laws ===
In corporate practice, "a pro-rata dividend means that every shareholder gets an equal proportion for each share he or she owns."

In banking, "Pro-rating also refers to the practice of applying interest rates to different time frames. If the interest rate was 12% per annum, you could pro-rate this number to be 1% a month (12%/12 months)."

=== Venture capital ===
In venture capital, it can refer to the Pro-Rata Participation right and mean "the right to continue to participate in future rounds so that you can maintain your ownership."

=== Insurance ===
In insurance, pro rata is used to determine risk based on the time the insurance policy is in effect. It may also be used to describe proportional liability when more than one person is responsible for a loss or accident.

=== Insurance cancellation method ===
Calculation of return premium of a cancelled insurance policy is often done using a cancellation method called pro rata. First, a return premium factor is calculated by taking the number of days remaining in the policy period divided by the number of total days of the policy. This factor is then multiplied by the policy premium to arrive at the return premium. This calculation is referred to as a "wheel calculation".

=== College tuition ===
When a college student withdraws, colleges may refund tuition payments on a pro rata basis.

=== Aviation ===
In the United States, a private pilot may pay no less than the pro rata share of the total price of the flight when carrying passengers.

=== Automobile ===
Pro-Ration (pro rata) means if the battery fails anytime within the first two years of service, it is replaced for free. After those first two years, a pro-rated fee is assessed for the replacement. However, the pro-ration (pro rata) is typically calculated from the date the battery was sold.

== See also ==
- Employee Retirement Income Security Act
- Legal liability
- Pro rata cancellation
- Pro rata condition of averages
- Vesting
