= Academic Technology Approval Scheme =

Scheme of the British government

The Academic Technology Approval Scheme (ATAS) is a British government program for certifying foreign students from outside the EU for entry into the United Kingdom to study or conduct research in specific sensitive technology-related fields. These particular students must obtain an ATAS certificate as a prerequisite for getting a British visa.

The ATAS was introduced on 1 November 2007 to help prevent sensitive knowledge from being shared outside the UK. It does this by checking that applicants are not connected to weapons of mass destruction (WMD) programs or advanced military technologies that could be used to develop or deliver such weapons.

Applicants go through a screening process to validate their reason for coming to the UK. According to the Foreign and Commonwealth Office, the checks are intended to screen out students who may pose a risk to national security. The ATAS focuses on subjects such as chemistry, engineering, physics, biophysics, metallurgy, and microbiology.

Under the earlier "Voluntary Vetting Scheme", some universities, such as the University of Bristol, voluntarily reported students they considered suspicious, often from certain countries, to the government. After ATAS was introduced, universities including the University of Cambridge, which had previously declined to participate, were required to cooperate with the authorities.

== Controversies ==
Significant processing delays within the ATAS scheme have drawn criticism for causing prospective students to defer or drop out of their programmes. In January 2026, Wendy Chamberlain brought the issue to the House of Commons, stating that the delays were detrimental to the country's "ability to be a world leader in research and development".
