= Cancellation (insurance) =

Ending of an insurance policy

Cancellation of an insurance policy before the end of the policy period has the effect of ending the insurance coverage on the date of the cancellation. This can result in a partial return premium which can be calculated in different ways depending on the method specified in the policy.

There are three typical calculation methods: pro-rate, or using a penalty method such as short period rate (old short rate), and short period rate (90% pro rata). The return premium is generally calculated using a wheel calculator, a type of circular slide rule or an online version. The return premium is calculated by calculating the unearned premium and then subtracting any unpaid premium and penalty for early cancellation.

== Refund methods ==
Three different calculation methods are commonly used. Cancellation methods are typically calculated using an online wheel calculator, a type of circular slide rule.

=== Pro rata ===
A non-penalty method of calculating the return premium of a canceled policy. A return premium factor is calculated by taking the number of days remaining in the policy period divided by the number of total days of the policy. This factor is multiplied by the written premium to arrive with the return premium.

=== Short Period Rate (old short rate) ===
A penalty method of calculating the return premium often used when the policy is canceled at the insured's request. It uses a table of factors that results in penalties that can be lower or higher than short rate (90% pro rata) depending upon the date of cancellation.

=== Short Period Rate (90% pro rata) ===
A penalty method where the penalty is 10% of the unearned premium.

== Policy term ==
The policy term is the period that an insurance policy provides coverage. Many policies have a one-year term (365 days) but other terms both longer and shorter are used. Policy terms can be for any length of time and can be for a short period when the period of risk is also short or can be for multi-year periods.

== See also ==
- Pro rata
- Travel insurance
