= List of Constitutional Court opinions of Kate O'Regan =

Kate O'Regan served in the Constitutional Court of South Africa from its inception in 1995 until her retirement in 2009.

== Majority opinions ==
No.	Case name	Citation	Notes
1	S v Bhulwana; S v Gwadiso	[1995] ZACC 11	Unanimous.
2	Besserglik v Minister of Trade, Industry and Tourism	[1996] ZACC 8	Unanimous.
3	Scagell v Attorney-General, Western Cape	[1996] ZACC 18	Unanimous.
4	Tsotetsi v Mutual and Federal Insurance Company	[1996] ZACC 19	Unanimous.
5	Prinsloo v Van der Linde	[1997] ZACC 5	Co-written with Ackermann and Sachs.
6	ANC v Minister of Local Government and Housing, KwaZulu-Natal	[1998] ZACC 2	Unanimous.
7	Fedsure Life Assurance v Greater Johannesburg Transitional Metropolitan Council	[1998] ZACC 17	Co-written with Chaskalson and Goldstone.
8	Premier v Association of Governing Bodies of State Aided Schools	[1998] ZACC 20	Unanimous.
9	South African National Defence Union v Minister of Defence	[1999] ZACC 7	
10	Veerasamy v Engen Refinery	[2000] ZACC 7	Unanimous.
11	Dawood v Minister of Home Affairs	[2000] ZACC 8	Unanimous.
12	Department of Education, Eastern Cape v Ed-U-College	[2000] ZACC 23	Unanimous.
13	Fredericks v MEC for Education and Training, Eastern Cape	[2001] ZACC 6	Unanimous.
14	S v Bierman	[2002] ZACC 7	Unanimous.
15	Khumalo v Holomisa	[2002] ZACC 12	Unanimous.
16	National Union of Metal Workers of South Africa v Bader Bop	[2002] ZACC 30	Unanimous.
17	Satchwell v President	[2003] ZACC 2	Unanimous.
18	S v Basson	[2004] ZACC 13	Co-written with Ackermann, Madala, Mokgoro, Moseneke, and Ngcobo.
19	Bato Star Fishing v Minister of Environmental Affairs and Tourism	[2004] ZACC 15	Dual opinions with Ngcobo; unanimous.
20	Mabaso v Law Society of the Northern Provinces	[2004] ZACC 8	Unanimous.
21	Rail Commuters Action Group v Transnet	[2004] ZACC 20	Unanimous.
22	K v Minister of Safety and Security	[2005] ZACC 8	Unanimous.
23	African Christian Democratic Party v Electoral Commission	[2006] ZACC 1	Unanimous.
24	South African Liquor Traders Association v Chairperson, Gauteng Liquor Board	[2006] ZACC 7	Unanimous.
25	Giddey v JC Barnard and Partners	[2006] ZACC 13	Unanimous.
26	South African Broadcasting Corporation v National Director of Public Prosecutions	[2006] ZACC 15	Co-written with Langa, Kondile, Madala, Nkabinde, Van Heerden and Yacoob.
27	South African National Defence Union v Minister of Defence	[2007] ZACC 10	Unanimous.
28	S v Shaik	[2008] ZACC 7	Unanimous.
29	Richter v Minister of Home Affairs	[2009] ZACC 3	Unanimous.
30	Lufuno Mphaphuli & Associates v Andrews	[2009] ZACC 6	
31	Mazibuko v City of Johannesburg	[2009] ZACC 28	Unanimous.
