= List of judgments of the Constitutional Court of South Africa delivered in 2002 =

The table below lists the judgments of the Constitutional Court of South Africa delivered in 2002.

The members of the court at the start of 2002 were Chief Justice Arthur Chaskalson, Deputy Chief Justice Pius Langa, and judges Lourens Ackermann, Richard Goldstone, Johann Kriegler, Tholie Madala, Yvonne Mokgoro, Sandile Ngcobo, Kate O'Regan, Albie Sachs and Zak Yacoob. Justice Kriegler retired in November and Dikgang Moseneke was appointed in his place.

Citation	Case name	Heard	Decided	Majority author
[2002] ZACC 1	Prince v President of the Law Society of the Cape of Good Hope	17 May 2001	25 January 2002	Chaskalson, Ackermann and Kriegler
[2002] ZACC 2	Bel Porto School Governing Body and Others v Premier of the Western Cape and Another	8 May 2001	21 February 2002	Chaskalson
[2002] ZACC 3	Islamic Unity Convention v Independent Broadcasting Authority and Others	22 November 2001	11 April 2002	Langa
[2002] ZACC 4	Van der Walt v Metcash Trading Limited	21 February 2002	11 April 2002	Goldstone
[2002] ZACC 32	South African Municipal Workers Union v City of Cape Town and Others		9 May 2002	The Court
[2002] ZACC 5	First National Bank of SA Limited t/a Wesbank v Commissioner for the South African Revenue Services and Another; First National Bank of SA Limited t/a Wesbank v Minister of Finance	28 August 2001	16 May 2002	Ackermann
[2002] ZACC 6	Ex Parte Minister of Safety and Security and Others, in re: S v Walters and Another	15 November 2001	21 May 2002	Kriegler
[2002] ZACC 7	S v Bierman		11 June 2002	O'Regan
[2002] ZACC 8	S and Others v Van Rooyen and Others	10 September 2001	11 June 2002	Chaskalson
[2002] ZACC 9	National Director of Public Prosecutions and Another v Mohamed NO and Others	21 May 2002	12 June 2002	Ackermann
[2002] ZACC 10	S v Singo	12 March 2002	12 June 2002	Ngcobo
[2002] ZACC 11	Uthukela District Municipality and Others v President of the Republic of South Africa and Others	14 May 2002	12 June 2002	du Plessis (acting)
[2002] ZACC 12	Khumalo and Others v Holomisa	7 May 2002	14 June 2002	O'Regan
[2002] ZACC 13	In re: Certain Amicus Curiae Applications, Minister of Health and Others v Treatment Action Campaign and Others	2 May 2002	5 July 2002	The Court
[2002] ZACC 14	MEC for Health, KwaZulu-Natal v Premier of Kwazulu-Natal: In re Minister of Health and Others v Treatment Action Campaign and Others	6 May 2002	5 July 2002	The Court
[2002] ZACC 16	Minister of Health and Others v Treatment Action Campaign and Others (No 1)	3 April 2002	5 July 2002	The Court
[2002] ZACC 15	Minister of Health and Others v Treatment Action Campaign and Others (No 2)	2 May 2002	5 July 2002	The Court
[2002] ZACC 17	Van der Spuy v General Council of the Bar of South Africa	16 May 2002	18 July 2002	Langa
[2002] ZACC 18	Satchwell v President of the Republic of South Africa and Another	26 February 2002	25 July 2002	Madala
[2002] ZACC 19	Beyers v Eleven Judges of the Constitutional Court		10 September 2002	The Court
[2002] ZACC 20	Du Toit and Another v Minister of Welfare and Population Development and Others	9 May 2002	10 September 2002	Skweyiya (acting)
[2002] ZACC 33	United Democratic Movement v President of the Republic of South Africa and Others (No 1)	6–8 August 2002	4 October 2002	The Court
[2002] ZACC 21	United Democratic Movement v President of the Republic of South Africa and Others (No 2)	3–4 2002	4 October 2002	The Court
[2002] ZACC 34	President of the Republic of South Africa and Others v United Democratic Movement	6–8 August 2002	4 October 2002	The Court
[2002] ZACC 22	S v Jordan and Others	5 March 2002	9 October 2002	Ngcobo
[2002] ZACC 23	Ex Parte Mercer and Another		28 October 2002	The Court
[2002] ZACC 24	African National Congress v United Democratic Movement and Others	11 November 2002	19 November 2002	Chaskalson
[2002] ZACC 25	Swartbooi and Others v Brink and Another	12 November 2002	21 November 2002	Yacoob
[2002] ZACC 26	Phoebus Apollo Aviation CC v Minister of Safety and Security	5 November 2002	28 November 2002	Kriegler
[2002] ZACC 27	National Education Health & Allied Workers Union v University of Cape Town and Others	17 September 2002	6 December 2002	Ngcobo
[2002] ZACC 28	Democratic Alliance and Another v Masondo NO and Another	14 November 2002	12 December 2002	Langa
[2002] ZACC 29	Geuking v President of the Republic of South Africa and Others	21 November 2002	12 December 2002	Goldstone
[2002] ZACC 30	National Union of Metal Workers of South Africa and Others v Bader Bop (Pty) Ltd and Another	19 September 2002	13 December 2002	O'Regan
[2002] ZACC 31	Bannatyne v Bannatyne and Another	7 November 2002	20 December 2002	Mokgoro
