= S v Jordan =

South African legal case

- Court: Constitutional Court of South Africa
- Full case name: The State v Jordan and Others
- Decided: 9 October 2002
- Docket nos.: CCT 31/01
- Citations: [2002] ZACC 22; 2002 (6) SA 642; 2002 (11) BCLR 1117

Case history
- Appealed from: S v Jordan and Others 2002 (1) SA 797 (T); 2001 (10) BCLR 1055 (T); 2002 (1) SACR 17 (T) in the High Court of South Africa, Transvaal Provincial Division

Court membership
- Judges sitting: Chaskalson CJ, Langa DCJ, Ackermann J, Goldstone J, Kriegler J, Madala J, Ngcobo J, O’Regan J, Sachs J, du Plessis AJ and Skweyiya AJ

Case opinions
- Decision by: Ngcobo J (Chaskalson, Kriegler, Madala, du Plessis and Skweyiya concurring)
- Dissent: O'Regan and Sachs JJ (Langa, Ackermann and Goldstone concurring)

S v Jordan and Others is a decision of the Constitutional Court of South Africa which confirmed the constitutionality of statutory prohibitions on brothel-keeping and prostitution. It was handed down on 9 October 2002 with a majority judgment by Justice Sandile Ngcobo.

Hearing a challenge to provisions of the Sexual Offences Act, 1957, the court held unanimously that it is constitutional to criminalise brothel-keeping. However, the bench split six-to-five on the constitutionality of section 20(1)(aA) of the Act, which criminalises prostitution. Writing on behalf of the minority, Justices Kate O'Regan and Albie Sachs argued that the prostitution prohibition discriminated indirectly but unfairly against women, while the majority dismissed this view on the grounds that both men and women are barred from conducting sex work.

== Background ==
The applicants, three women, were arrested in 1996 at their workplace, a brothel in Pretoria. Charged in the Magistrate's Court, they were convicted of contraventions of the Sexual Offences Act, 1957 – the brothel's owner and receptionist were convicted of keeping a brothel, an offence under section 2, and a sex worker was convicted of conducting indecent sexual acts for reward, an offence under section 20(1)(aA). In particular, the sex worker had been paid R250 to administer a pelvic massage to an undercover policeman.

Though the women did not dispute their involvement in sex work, they appealed their convictions to the High Court of South Africa, contending that the relevant provisions of the Sexual Offences Act are unconstitutional. In August 2001, the High Court's Transvaal Provincial Division found in the appellants' favour on the prostitution provision, finding that it is unconstitutional to criminalise prostitution. However, the challenge to the brothel-keeping provisions was dismissed.

The matter went to the Constitutional Court of South Africa, which was charged with confirming the invalidity of the prostitution provision; in addition, the first and second women appealed the unfavourable finding on the brothel-keeping provisions. The state opposed both applications, represented by Wim Trengove SC; the appellants were represented by David Unterhalter SC, and their applications were supported by several amici curiae. Argument was heard from 5 to 6 March 2002, and judgment was handed down on 9 October 2002.

== Judgment ==
=== Brothel-keeping ===
Unlike the High Court, the Constitutional Court decided the constitutionality question with reference to the Interim Constitution, which had prevailed at the time of the offence, rather than with reference to the 1996 Constitution. On this basis, the court agreed unanimously to uphold the High Court's finding that the prohibition on brothel-keeping is constitutionally compliant, thereby dismissing the appeals of the first and second appellants.

=== Prostitution ===
However, the bench divided six-to-five on the constitutionality of the prohibition on prostitution. The minority judgment was co-written by Justices Kate O'Regan and Albie Sachs, with the concurrence of Deputy Chief Justice Pius Langa and Justices Laurie Ackermann and Richard Goldstone. Although the minority dismissed the appellants' arguments from the rights to human dignity, freedom of person, privacy, and economic activity, respectively, the minority was persuaded by the argument that the prostitution provision indirectly brought about unfair discrimination, in violation of the right to equality in Section Nine of the Constitution. O'Regan and Sachs held that insofar as the law makes the prostitute (typically a woman) the primary offender and her patron (typically man) nothing more than an accomplice, it reinforces sexist double standards and perpetuates gender stereotypes in a manner inconsistent with the constitutional commitment to gender equality. On these grounds, the minority would have confirmed the High Court's order that section 20(1)(aA) of the Sexual Offences Act is unconstitutional and invalid.

However, writing for the six-person majority, Justice Sandile Ngcobo argued that the criminalisation of prostitution is not discriminatory because the law criminalises prostitution by men as well as by women. Moreover, the majority agreed with the minority (though for slightly different reasons) that the appellants' other constitutional arguments failed. It therefore held that the prohibition is constitutional; the court therefore declined to confirm the High Court's order and instead set it aside, dismissing the women's applications and reinstating their criminal sentences. Ngcobo's opinion was joined by Chief Justice Arthur Chaskalson, Justices Johann Kriegler and Tholie Madala, and Acting Justices Ben du Plessis and Thembile Skweyiya.

== Reception ==
The majority judgment was unpopular among many feminist activists and some legal commentators. Ntombizozuko Dyani-Mhango observed that the majority judgment's deference to the political branches was characteristic of Ngcobo's jurisprudence.

== See also ==
- Decriminalisation of sex work
- Prostitution in South Africa
