= Dawood v Minister of Home Affairs =

South African legal case

- Court: Constitutional Court of South Africa
- Full case name: Dawood and Another v Minister of Home Affairs and Others; Shalabi and Another v Minister of Home Affairs and Others; Thomas and Another v Minister of Home Affairs and Others
- Decided: 7 June 2000
- Docket nos.: CCT 35/99
- Citations: [2000] ZACC 8; 2000 (3) SA 936; 2000 (8) BCLR 837

Case history
- Prior actions: Dawood and Another v Minister of Home Affairs and Others; Shalabi and Another v Minister of Home Affairs and Others; Thomas and Another v Minister of Home Affairs and Others 2000 (1) SA 997 (C) in the High Court of South Africa, Cape of Good Hope Provincial Division

Court membership
- Judges sitting: Chaskalson P, Langa DP, Goldstone J, Kriegler J, Madala J, Mokgoro J, Ngcobo J, O’Regan J, Sachs J, Yacoob J and Cameron AJ

Case opinions
- Decision by: O'Regan J (unanimous)

Dawood and Another v Minister of Home Affairs and Others; Shalabi and Another v Minister of Home Affairs and Others; Thomas and Another v Minister of Home Affairs and Others is an important decision in South African constitutional law and immigration law. It was delivered in the Constitutional Court of South Africa on 7 June 2000. In a unanimous judgment written by Justice Kate O'Regan, the court held that the constitutional right to dignity contained implicit protections for the right to family life and the institution of marriage.

In particular, provisions of the Aliens Control Act, 1991 were found to be inconsistent with the right to dignity insofar as they permitted immigration officials wide discretion to refuse residence permits to the foreign spouses of South Africans, thereby undermining the ability of married couples to cohabitate. The court held that when Parliament grants government officials such powers and others that touch on constitutional rights, it must lay down proper guidelines for exercising those powers in compliance with the Constitution.

== Background ==
The six applicants were three married couples of mixed nationality: in each case, a South African had married a foreign spouse. Each foreign spouse sought to obtain an immigration permit which would permit them to reside permanently in South Africa in terms of the Aliens Control Act, 1991. They laid suit in the High Court of South Africa against the Minister of Home Affairs and proximate state officials, challenging the constitutionality of the immigration process as governed by that Act; their applications were heard together in the High Court's Cape Provincial Division.

Acting Judge Belinda van Heerden granted their applications, finding that section 25(9)(b) of the Aliens Control Act was unconstitutional and invalid. Although van Heerden noted that section 25(9) was not drafted clearly, she interpreted it as establishing a general rule that the Immigrants Selection Board (the state agency empowered to grant immigration permits) may grant immigration permanents only when the applicant is not in South Africa. Section 25(9)(a) created an exception to that general rule for applicants who possessed a valid work permit, and section 25(9)(b) created a further exception for spouses and dependents who possessed a valid temporary residence permit. Thus section 25(9)(b) permitted the foreign spouses to reside in South Africa while awaiting permanent immigration status, but only if and while they possessed a valid temporary residence permit. This created a situation in which mixed-nationality couples could be denied the right to cohabitate, because immigration officials retained the discretion to deny temporary residence permits to foreign spouses. Such a situation infringed unjustifiably on the constitutional right to dignity, which van Heerden held encompassed the right of spouses to cohabitate.

The Constitutional Court of South Africa was called upon to confirm the High Court's declaration of constitutional invalidity.

== Judgment ==
=== Withdrawal of government opposition ===
Though the applicants were represented by counsel including Wim Trengove, instructed by the Legal Resources Centre, the state respondents did not appear during the Constitutional Court's hearings: shortly before the hearing, they notified the court that they intended to withdraw their opposition to the applicants' application for confirmation. Writing on behalf of a unanimous court, Justice Kate O'Regan chastised the respondents. She described their withdrawal as "inconvenient and discourteous", and their lack of representation as "much more serious" insofar as the court required the state's input in formulating any ancillary orders, even if the application itself was unopposed. In the South African constitutional scheme, which "recognises the separation of powers, holds high the rule of law and enjoins all organs of State to protect the Constitution", the Constitutional Court has "the special and onerous responsibility" to determine the constitutionality of legislation, and the evidence and argument of government is indispensable in fulfilling this responsibility.

=== Merits ===
The court held that, although the right to family life is not expressly mentioned in the South African Bill of Rights, it is implicitly protected by the section 10 right to human dignity. The right to dignity encompasses the right to enter into and sustain permanent intimate relationships, including marriage relationships, which are of defining significance for many people. The right to dignity is therefore limited by any legislation that prohibits the formation of marriage relationships and, moreover, by any legislation that significantly impairs the ability of spouses to honour their obligations to one another. A central aspect of marriage, O'Regan found, is cohabitation and the right and duty of spouses to live together, and enforced separation may strain and even destroy the marriage relationship. Legislation which significantly impairs the ability of spouses to cohabitate therefore constitutes a limitation on the right to dignity.

O'Regan agreed with the High Court that the Aliens Control Act impaired the ability of spouses to cohabitate. Section 25(9)(b) provided that, while awaiting a determination on their permanent immigration status, foreign spouses were permitted to reside in South Africa only if they had valid temporary residence permits, and section 26, which dealt with the award and extension of such permits, provided immigration officials with broad discretion to deny such permits to foreign spouses. If they were refused a temporary residence permit or the extension thereof, foreign spouses would be forced to leave South Africa, and the South African spouse would be forced either to follow them abroad or – particularly if they were poor – remain behind alone.

There may be, O'Regan conceded, constitutionally acceptable reasons for refusing the grant or extension of a temporary residence permit to a foreign spouse, but such reasons were not identified in the Act. This absence of explicit criteria introduced an element of arbitrariness that was inconsistent with the constitutional protection of the right to marry and establish a family. The legislature must identify the policy considerations that would render it justifiable to refuse a temporary residence permit. It must take care to limit the risk of an unconstitutional exercise of the discretionary powers it confers, as it has a constitutional obligation to "respect, promote, protect and fulfil the rights in the Bill of Rights".

Section 25(9)(b) was therefore found to be invalid, the invalidation being suspended for two years. In the meantime, the Constitution Court instructed immigration officials to take into account the constitutional rights of foreign spouses (and of other persons exempted under section 25(9)) when considering such individuals' applications for the granting or extension of temporary residence permits. Such individuals should be issued temporary residence permits unless good cause exists to refuse – for example, where even the temporary issue or extension of a permit would constitute a real threat to the public.

== See also ==
- Constitutional litigation in South Africa
- South African nationality law
