= Khumalo v Holomisa =

South African legal case

- Court: Constitutional Court of South Africa
- Full case name: Fred Khumalo and Others v Bantu Holomisa
- Decided: 14 June 2002
- Docket nos.: CCT 53/01
- Citations: [2002] ZACC 12; 2002 (5) SA 401; 2002 (8) BCLR 771

Case history
- Appealed from: High Court of South Africa, Transvaal Provincial Division – Holomisa v Khumalo and Others 2002 (3) SA 38 (T)

Court membership
- Judges sitting: Chaskalson CJ, Langa DCJ, Ackermann J, Goldstone J, Kriegler J, Madala J, Ngcobo J, O'Regan J, Sachs J, Du Plessis AJ, and Skweyiya AJ

Case opinions
- The Constitution does not entail in any circumstances that the common law of delict must require a plaintiff in a defamation action to plead that the defamatory statement is false.
- Decision by: O'Regan J (unanimous)

Khumalo and Others v Holomisa is a landmark decision in the South African law of delict. It was decided by the Constitutional Court of South Africa on 21 May 2002. Handing down judgment for a unanimous court, Justice Kate O'Regan held that the existing common law of defamation is consistent with the Bill of Rights. The case emanated from a challenge by members of the press, who argued, in the main, that falsity should be an element of the delict of defamation in suits brought by public officials. However, the court rejected this argument, finding that existing common law does not impose an undue limitation on freedom of expression.

In the law of defamation, Khumalo was significant for measuring the common law against the Constitution, for affirming the link between common-law personality rights and the constitutional right to dignity, and for upholding the reasonableness defence against defamation, which was developed by the Supreme Court of Appeal in National Media v Bogoshi. In constitutional law more broadly, the judgment was significant for its interpretation of section 8 of the Constitution and particularly of provisions on the application of the Bill of Rights to private persons and therefore to private disputes.

== Background ==
The case emanated from a defamation lawsuit lodged by Bantu Holomisa, a prominent national politician, in the Transvaal High Court. His suit was a response to allegations published in the Sunday World newspaper that he was under police investigation for involvement in a gang of bank robbers; the first respondent was Fred Khumalo, the editor of the Sunday World.

In the course of this dispute, Khumalo and the other respondents raised a constitutional issue in an exception to Holomisa's pleading. High Court Judge Johann van der Westhuizen dismissed the exception but granted the respondents leave to appeal his decision on the exception. The Constitutional Court of South Africa heard the matter on 7 May 2002 and delivered judgment on 14 June 2002.

== Argument ==
The exception raised by Khumalo and his associates (the appellants in the Constitutional Court) concerned the constitutionality of the existing common law on defamation. In particular, at South Africa common law, as in English law, the elements of the delict of defamation do not include the falsity of the defamatory statement. Once the plaintiff establishes that the defendant has published a defamatory statement, the truth of the statement may become part of the plaintiff's defence, going to the lawfulness of publication, but a plaintiff may well succeed in a defamation claim without asserting or establishing that the defamatory statement was false.

By contrast, the appellants held that the plaintiff should, in certain circumstances, be required to establish the falsity of the defamatory statement. This requirement should apply when the action related to a defamatory statement about "matters of public interest, alternatively to matters of political importance, alternatively to the fitness of a public official for public office, alternatively to the fitness of a politician for public office"; alternatively, its scope could be narrowed even further to apply only to such action when brought by a politician or public official. As precedent for imposing such an obligation on the plaintiff, the appellants cited the United States Supreme Court in New York Times Co. v Sullivan, which established the actual malice standard. In any case, in matters invoking the public interest, the appellants contended that existing defamation law – and its low bar for claims – imposed an unjustifiable limitation on the right to freedom of expression, which was guaranteed in section 16 of the Constitution.

== Judgment ==
Writing for a unanimous court, Justice Kate O'Regan granted the applicants leave to appeal. However, she dismissed the appeal, holding that the applicants had not shown that the existing common law of defamation is inconsistent with the Constitution.

=== Horizontal application ===
Somewhat unusually, the appellants sought to apply the section 16 constitutional right to a private dispute between two non-state parties, which would ordinarily be governed by the common law. Though not often resorted to, section 8(2) of the Constitution does indeed provide that the Bill of Rights may bind natural or juristic persons, and, in terms of section 8(3), that the courts may develop the common law when applying the Bill of Rights to private persons. In this regard, O'Regan found:

In this case, the applicants are members of the media who are expressly identified as bearers of constitutional rights to freedom of expression. There can be no doubt that the law of defamation does affect the right to freedom of expression. Given the intensity of the constitutional right in question, coupled with the potential invasion of that right which could be occasioned by persons other than the state or organs of state, it is clear that the right to freedom of expression is of direct horizontal application in this case as contemplated by section 8(2) of the Constitution. The first question we need then to determine is whether the common law of defamation unjustifiably limits that right. If it does, it will be necessary to develop the common law in the manner contemplated by section 8(3) of the Constitution.

=== The common law ===
O'Regan's analysis of existing common law turned on the recognition that "the law of defamation lies at the intersection of the freedom of speech and the protection of reputation or good name". In the latter regard, the actio iniuriarum arises from injury to reputation (fama) and injury to dignitas. Per O'Regan, these personality rights have a constitutional grounding, above all in the constitutional value of (and section 10 right to) human dignity, which "values both the personal sense of self-worth as well as the public’s estimation of the worth or value of an individual". Likewise, human dignity is closely linked to the section 14 right to privacy. Thus, by seeking "to protect the legitimate interest individuals have in their reputation", the law of defamation supported the protection of the constitutional value of human dignity. Thus:

In deciding whether the common law rule complained of by the applicants does indeed constitute an unjustifiable limitation of section 16 of the Constitution, sight must not be lost of other constitutional values and in particular, the value of human dignity. To succeed, the applicants need to show that the balance struck by the common law, in excluding from the elements of the delict a requirement that the defamatory statement published be false, an appropriate balance has been struck between the freedom of expression, on the one hand, and the value of human dignity on the other.

In response to such argument, the applicants had contended that plaintiffs could not assert a strong constitutional interest in protecting their reputations against the publication of truthful statements – that is, per O'Regan, "no person can argue a legitimate constitutional interest in maintaining a reputation based on a false foundation". Yet the same consideration also cuts against the freedom of expression argument: "the constitutional protection of freedom of expression has at best an attenuated interest in the publication of false statements."

Turning to freedom of expression, O'Regan acknowledged that, in leaving the burden of proof of falsity to the defendant, the common law of defamation may have a chilling effect on the publication of information and therefore on freedom of expression. This would be problematic had not the Supreme Court of Appeal recently ruled in National Media v Bogoshi that reasonableness is a defence to defamation: under Bogoshi, the publication in the press of false defamatory statements is not unlawful if such publication was reasonable in the circumstances. Indeed, the evaluation of a reasonableness defence can take into account such constitutionally significant factors as the right to dignity, right to privacy, and the crucial role of the press in open democracy. The availability of reasonableness defence, along with the established "truth in public benefit" defence, substantially mitigated any chilling effect, because, "it will only be where defendants establish neither that the statement was true and its publication in the public interest, nor that the publication was reasonable in all the circumstances, that they will be held delictually liable."

Thus O'Regan concluded that the existing common law struck an appropriate balance between the constitutional interests of the plaintiff and the defendant respectively. Because of "the difficulty of establishing the truth or falsehood of defamatory statements", it would not be in keeping with the Constitution to burden either the plaintiff or the defendant with the onus of proving a statement to be true or false. The Bogoshi reasonableness defence protected the defendant from being burdened with such an onus, and, likewise, existing common law protected the plaintiff from the same.

== Significance ==
In South African constitutional law, the Khumalo judgment was significant primarily because it was the first case in which, in the summation of Justice Dikgang Moseneke, the Constitutional Court "upheld direct application of a provision of the Bill of Rights to a common law rule". Other commentators argued that it should not properly be classified as a case of direct or horizontal application. In any case, however, the judgment was significant for providing precedent in which the court applied section 8(2) of the Constitution to disputes between private parties, providing for the possibility that litigants may challenge the constitutionality of the common law on the grounds that it permits a non-state actor to infringe on their constitutional interests.

However, in subsequent years, the Khumalo approach did not gain in popularity; instead, the Constitutional Court preferred to apply constitutional rights to private disputes indirectly, by deploying their section 39(2) power to develop the common law in line with the spirit of the Bill of Rights. Indeed, in Barkhuizen v Napier, Justice Sandile Ngcobo wrote on behalf of the court that the indirect method is the "proper" method when the Bill of Rights applies to contractual disputes. Stu Woolman said that, in endorsing Ngcobo's approach, the court had "flatly contradicted itself"; likewise, he criticised the Masiya v Director of Public Prosecutions judgment (in which O'Regan joined) for choosing "to ignore" the precedent of Khumalo.
