= S v Bhulwana; S v Gwadiso =

South African legal case

- Court: Constitutional Court of South Africa
- Full case name: State v Bhulwana; State v Gwadiso
- Decided: 29 November 1995
- Docket nos.: CCT12/95; CCT11/95
- Citations: [1995] ZACC 11, 1996 (1) SA 388; 1995 (12) BCLR 1579 (CC)

Case history
- Prior actions: Referrals from Supreme Court of South Africa, Cape of Good Hope Provincial Division: S v Bhulwana [1994] ZAWCHC 1; S v Gwadiso [1995] ZAWCHC 2

Court membership
- Judges sitting: Chaskalson P, Ackermann J, Didcott J, Kriegler J, Langa J, Madala J, Mokgoro J, O'Regan J, Sachs J and Ngoepe AJ

Case opinions
- Decision by: O'Regan J (unanimous)

In S v Bhulwana; S v Gwadiso, the Constitutional Court of South Africa established the unconstitutionality of a reverse onus provision applying to the offence of drug dealing under the Drugs and Drug Trafficking Act, 1992. Under section 21(1)(a)(i) of the Act, accused persons found in possession of over 150 grams of dagga were presumed guilty of dealing in dagga unless their innocence was proved in court. Handing down a unanimous judgment on 29 November 1995, Justice Kate O'Regan held that this provision violated the presumption of innocence and therefore the constitutional right to a fair trial.

== Background ==
The applicants, Godzana Bhulwana and Joe Gwadiso, were both arrested in 1994 after being found in possession of dagga: Bhulwana in Kleinmond in possession of 850 grams, and Gwadiso in Grabouw with 445 grams. Both were convicted in the magistrates' court of dealing in dagga. At the time of their convictions, section 21(1)(a)(i) of the Drugs and Drug Trafficking Act, 1992, provided that in their situations – in which the accused faced a charge of dealing and had been found in possession of dagga exceeding 115 grams – "it shall be presumed, until the contrary is proved, that the accused dealt in such dagga".

On automatic review, each case came separately before the Cape Provincial Division of the Supreme Court of South Africa. Hearing Bhulwana's case, Judge Robin Marais held that the evidence against Bhulwana would not have been sufficient to convict him in the absence of the presumption contained in section 21(1)(a). The correctness of Bhulwana's conviction therefore dependended on the constitutionality of the presumption, and Marais believed that the presumption was prima facie unconstitutional. He therefore referred the constitutionality question to the Constitutional Court of South Africa, using the referral mechanism in section 102(1) of the Interim Constitution. Hearing Gwadiso's case, Judge Jeanette Traverso agreed with Marais's reasoning and found that Gwadiso's conviction was similarly reliant on the section 21(1)(a) presumption. She therefore followed Marais in referring the case to the Constitutional Court. The Constitutional Court conjoined the matters for hearing on 12 September 1995.

== Judgment ==
On 29 November 1995, Justice Kate O'Regan handed down judgment on behalf of a unanimous bench. The court's determination centred on the requirements of the right to the presumption of innocence, which was enshrined in section 25(3)(c) of the Interim Constitution as a component of an accused person's fair trial rights. O'Regan deferred to the exposition of the presumption of innocence in S v Zuma, the Constitutional Court's first judgment, in which Acting Justice Sydney Kentridge had adjudicated a challenge to a similar provision of the Criminal Procedure Act, 1977. Following Kentridge, O'Regan held that:

...the presumption of innocence is an established principle of South African law which places the burden of proof squarely on the prosecution. The entrenchment of the presumption of innocence in section 25(3)(c) must be interpreted in this context. It requires that the prosecution bear the burden of proving all the elements of a criminal charge. A presumption which relieves the prosecution of part of that burden could result in the conviction of an accused person despite the existence of a reasonable doubt as to his or her guilt. Such a presumption is in breach of the presumption of innocence and therefore offends section 25(3)(c). Section 21(1)(a)(i) is such a presumption.

O'Regan therefore held that the reverse onus provision of section 21(1)(a)(1) clearly breached the constitutional right to the presumption of innocence. In terms of a test outlined in Justice Arthur Chaskalson's judgment in S v Makwanyane, she proceeded to conduct a balancing exercise to evaluate whether that breach was proportionate and justifiable in terms of section 33 of the Constitution. The state asserted that the purpose of the reverse onus was to assist in controlling the illegal drug trade by facilitating more dealing convictions and heavier sentences for those convicted. Yet O'Regan did not find this to provide sufficient justificatory grounds: there was "no logical connection between the fact proved (possession of 115g) and the fact presumed (dealing)", and, "although the need to suppress illicit drug trafficking is an urgent and pressing one, it is not clear how, if at all, the presumption furthers such an objective". She therefore held that the reverse onus of section 21(1)(a)(1) constituted an unjustifiable and therefore unconstitutional infringement of the constitutional right to presumption of innocence.

The court declared that section 21(1)(a)(i) of the Drugs and Drug Trafficking Act was inconsistent with the Interim Constitution and invalid with effect from the date of the judgment. In terms of the court's order, the declaration of invalidity would apply retroactively to all criminal trials in which the trial court's verdict was entered after the Constitution came into force and which were currently pending review, pending appeal, or eligible for appeal. Bhulwana and Gwadiso's reviews were referred back to the Cape Provincial Division for determination in accordance with the declaration of invalidity.

== Significance ==
Delivered during the Constitutional Court's first year of operation, the judgment developed the court's jurisprudence with respect to the application of the rights-balancing exercise, and legislative remedies with retrospective effect, as well as criminal procedure broadly. Some commentators noted with interest the court's apparently permissive stance on dagga possession, though for others this stance reflected the court's "strong aversion against reverse onus provisions", of which Bhulwana and Zuma provided early indications.
