= Satchwell v President of the Republic of South Africa =

South African legal case

- Court: Constitutional Court of South Africa
- Full case name: Satchwell v President of the Republic of South Africa and Another
- Decided: 25 July 2002
- Citations: [2002] ZACC 18, 2002 (9) BCLR 986 (CC), 2002 (6) SA 1 (CC)

Case history
- Appealed from: Transvaal Provincial Division
- Subsequent actions: [2003] ZACC 2 (17 March 2003), Constitutional Court

Court membership
- Judges sitting: Chaskalson CJ, Langa DCJ, Ackermann, Goldstone, Kriegler, Madala, Ngcobo, O'Regan & Sachs JJ, Du Plessis & Skweyiya AJJ

Case opinions
- Decision by: Madala

Satchwell v President of the Republic of South Africa and Another is a 2002 decision of the Constitutional Court of South Africa which determined that the same-sex life partner of a judge was entitled to the same financial benefits available to the opposite-sex spouse of a judge. The case, which challenged the Judges' Remuneration and Conditions of Employment Act, 1989, was brought by Kathy Satchwell, an openly lesbian judge of the Transvaal Provincial Division (now known as the Gauteng Division) of the High Court.

The court ruled unanimously that the law violated the equality clause of the Bill of Rights, which forbids unfair discrimination on the basis of sexual orientation. The judgment therefore amended the law to extend the spousal benefits to same-sex partners who had undertaken "reciprocal duties of support". Although the holding, strictly speaking, was limited to judges and their partners, it was seen as having a wider effect, with the director of the Lesbian and Gay Equality Project describing it as "yet another step toward the formal legal recognition of same-sex relationships".

In 2003 it was realised that a new version of the act (the Judges' Remuneration and Conditions of Employment Act, 2001) had been passed and, due to a drafting error, still included the former discriminatory language. The Constitutional Court granted an order applying the reasoning of its earlier ruling to the new act.
