= Denise Ackermann =

- Born: Denise Margaret du Toit; 1939 (age 86–87)
- Citizenship: South African
- Occupations: Theologian, Author, Academic
- Known for: Feminist Theology
- Spouse: Laurie Ackermann
- Children: 3

Academic background
- Education: Doctor of Theology (DTh)
- Alma mater: University of the Western Cape
- Influences: Liberation Theology, African Feminist theology

Academic work
- Era: 20th- 21st century theology
- Institutions: University of Western Cape, Stellenbosch University
- Main interests: Feminist theology, social justice, gender equality, practical theology

Denise Margaret Ackermann (née du Toit, born 1939) is a South African feminist theologian, scholar, and activist known for her contributions to feminist theology, liberation theology, and public theology in Africa.

She is Emeritus Professor of the Department of Religion and Theology, University of the Western Cape in Belleville, South Africa, and has been a visiting professor of practical theology at the University of Stellenbosch.

She is recognized for developing a theology of praxis that connects Christian faith with social justice, gender equality, and political transformation in the context of apartheid and post-apartheid South Africa.

She has written on racism and apartheid, women's issues, and the AIDS crisis in Africa. Her books include After the Locusts: Letters from a Landscape of Faith (2003), Tamar's Cry: Re-reading an Ancient Text in the Midst of an HIV/AIDS Pandemic (2002), and Women Hold Up Half the Sky: Women in the Church in South Africa (co-authored 1991).

Ackermann’s work has played a major role in shaping African feminist theology, and she has contributed significantly to the Circle of Concerned African Women Theologians, an international network that promotes African women’s voices in theological scholarship. Through her academic work, activism, and publications, she has influenced debates on gender justice, church reform, and Christian responses to social suffering in Africa and beyond.

== Early life ==
Denise Margaret Ackermann (née du Toit) was born in South Africa in 1939. She grew up during the apartheid era, a system of racial segregation that shaped the political and social environment of the country. Her father served as a diplomat in the South African government or as a South African ambassador, and she spent part of her early life exposed to international contexts.

Despite growing up in a privileged white family during apartheid, Ackermann later became critical of the system and engaged in theological and social reflection on injustice, suffering, oppression, and reconciliation.

She married Laurie Ackermann in 1958, a South African legal scholar and former judge of the Constitutional Court of South Africa. The couple had three children and lived for many years in Cape Town.

== Education ==
Ackermann entered theological education later in life and often described herself as a “latecomer to academic theology.” Her academic work developed during a time when feminist theology was emerging globally.

She earned a Doctor of Theology (DTh) from the University of the Western Cape in 1990. Her doctoral research examined the experiences of women involved in the Black Sash movement, a group of white South African women who protested against apartheid laws. This was one of the first feminist theology doctorates in South Africa. Her thesis used feminist theology to analyze women’s participation in social justice activism.

Her academic formation combined elements of practical theology, liberation theology, and feminist theological reflection, which became central themes in her later scholarship.

== Career ==
Ackermann became a leading scholar in South African theological education and held several important academic roles. She served as Professor of Christianity and Society at the University of the Western Cape, where she taught and supervised research in feminist theology, ethics, and public theology. She also worked as a visiting professor of practical theology at Stellenbosch University, contributing to research on gender, justice, and theology in African contexts.

Internationally, Ackermann served as a Procter Fellow at Episcopal Divinity School in Cambridge, Massachusetts, in the United States. She also participated in global theological discussions through the Anglican Communion and other ecumenical forums where she served as theological adviser to Archbishop Njongonkulu Ndungane at the Lambeth Conference of the Anglican Communion in 1998.

Her academic work focused on the relationship between faith, gender justice, and social transformation, especially in societies affected by violence and inequality.

== Circle of Concerned African Women Theologians ==
Ackermann has been actively involved in the Circle of Concerned African Women Theologians, a network founded to encourage African women to write and develop theology from their own experiences. Her work has helped open academic and ecclesial spaces for women’s voices in theological scholarship across Africa.

She is particularly known for developing ideas about; feminist practical theology, healing and reconciliation in post-conflict societies and the relationship between faith and social justice.

== Theological Thoughts ==
=== Feminist Theology ===
Ackermann is widely regarded as one of the pioneers of feminist theology in South Africa. Her work challenges patriarchal structures within both church and society and emphasizes the equal dignity and humanity of women. She argues that theological reflection must take women’s experiences seriously, particularly the experiences of suffering, marginalization, and resistance.

=== Theology of Praxis ===
A central theme in Ackermann’s work is the idea that theology must be lived and practiced. She describes theology as: “critical reflection on faith and practice.” For Ackermann, faith cannot remain abstract or theoretical. Instead, Christian belief must lead to concrete action that promotes justice, healing, and reconciliation.

=== Liberation and Justice ===
Her work is strongly influenced by liberation theology and the struggle against apartheid. She has written extensively about:

- social injustice
- violence against women
- HIV/AIDS in Africa
- reconciliation in post-apartheid society
- the role of the church in public life

Through these themes, she promotes a theology that responds directly to human suffering and social inequality.

=== Activism and Public Engagement ===
Ackermann’s theological work is closely connected with social activism. She studied and supported the Black Sash movement, an organization of women who protested apartheid policies through peaceful demonstrations and advocacy. Her engagement with social movements helped shape her understanding that theology must be rooted in real human struggles. She has also contributed to international theological conversations on gender, justice, and the role of religion in society.

== Awards and Recognition ==
Denise Ackermann is regarded as one of the most influential South African feminist theologians of the late twentieth and early twenty-first centuries. Her work has contributed significantly to the development of feminist theology in Africa and has influenced theological discussions on justice, gender equality, and reconciliation.

Her writings continue to be studied in universities and seminaries, particularly in fields such as African theology, feminist theology, and public theology.

== Selected works ==
- Ackermann, D. (1993). Meaning and power: Some key terms in feminist liberation theology. Scriptura: Journal for Biblical, Theological and Contextual Hermeneutics, 44, 19-33.
- Ackermann, D. M. (1998). Becoming fully human: An ethic of relationship in difference and otherness. Journal of Theology for Southern Africa, (102), 13.
- Ackermann, Denise M. (2002). Tamar’s Cry: Re-reading an Ancient Text in the Midst of the HIV/AIDS Pandemic.
- Ackermann, D. (2002). Tamar's cry: Re-reading an ancient text in the midst of an HIV/AIDS pandemic. CIIR.
- Ackermann, Denise M. (2003). After the Locusts: Letters from a Landscape of Faith. Cape Town: David Philip.
- Ackermann, D. (2005). Engaging stigma: An embodied theological response to HIV and AIDS: The challenge of HIV/AIDS to Christian theology. Scriptura: Journal for Contextual Hermeneutics in Southern Africa, 89(1), 385-395.
- Ackermann, D. (2008). Rosemary Radford Ruether: Themes from a feminist liberation story. Scriptura: Journal for Contextual Hermeneutics in Southern Africa, 97(1), 37-46.
- Ackermann, D. M. (2013). On being a theologian for" others". Dutch Reformed Theological Journal= Nederduitse Gereformeerde Teologiese Tydskrif, 54(sup-5), 6-15.
- Ackermann, D. M. (2014). Surprised by the man on the borrowed donkey: ordinary blessings. Lux Verbi.

=== Edited works ===
- Ackermann, Denise M. (ed.) (1998). Liberating Faith Practices: Feminist Practical Theologies in Context.
- Ackermann, Denise M., Draper, Jonathan A., & Mashinini, Emma (eds.) (1991). Women Hold Up Half the Sky: Women in the Church in Southern Africa.
