= Kate O'Regan =

Justice of the Constitutional Court of South Africa from 1994 to 2009

The Honourable Kate O'Regan
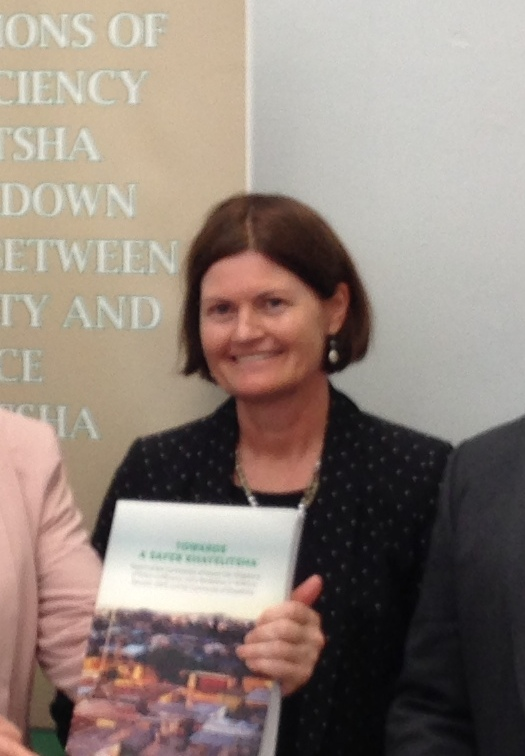
- O'Regan (2014)

Deputy Chief Justice of South Africa
- Acting; February 2008 – May 2008

Justice of the Constitutional Court of South Africa
- In office November 1994 – 11 October 2009
- Nominated by: Judicial Service Commission
- Appointed by: Nelson Mandela

Personal details
- Born: 17 September 1957 (age 69) Liverpool, England
- Spouse(s): Alec Freund, SC
- Children: 2
- Education: University of Cape Town; University of Sydney; London School of Economics

Catherine "Kate" O'Regan (born 17 September 1957) is a former judge of the Constitutional Court of South Africa. From 2013 to 2014 she was a commissioner of the Khayelitsha Commission and is now the inaugural director of the Bonavero Institute of Human Rights at the University of Oxford.

== Early life ==
O'Regan was born in Liverpool, England, into a large Catholic family of Irish immigrants. She moved to Cape Town when she was seven. Her mother was a dentist and her father was a doctor.

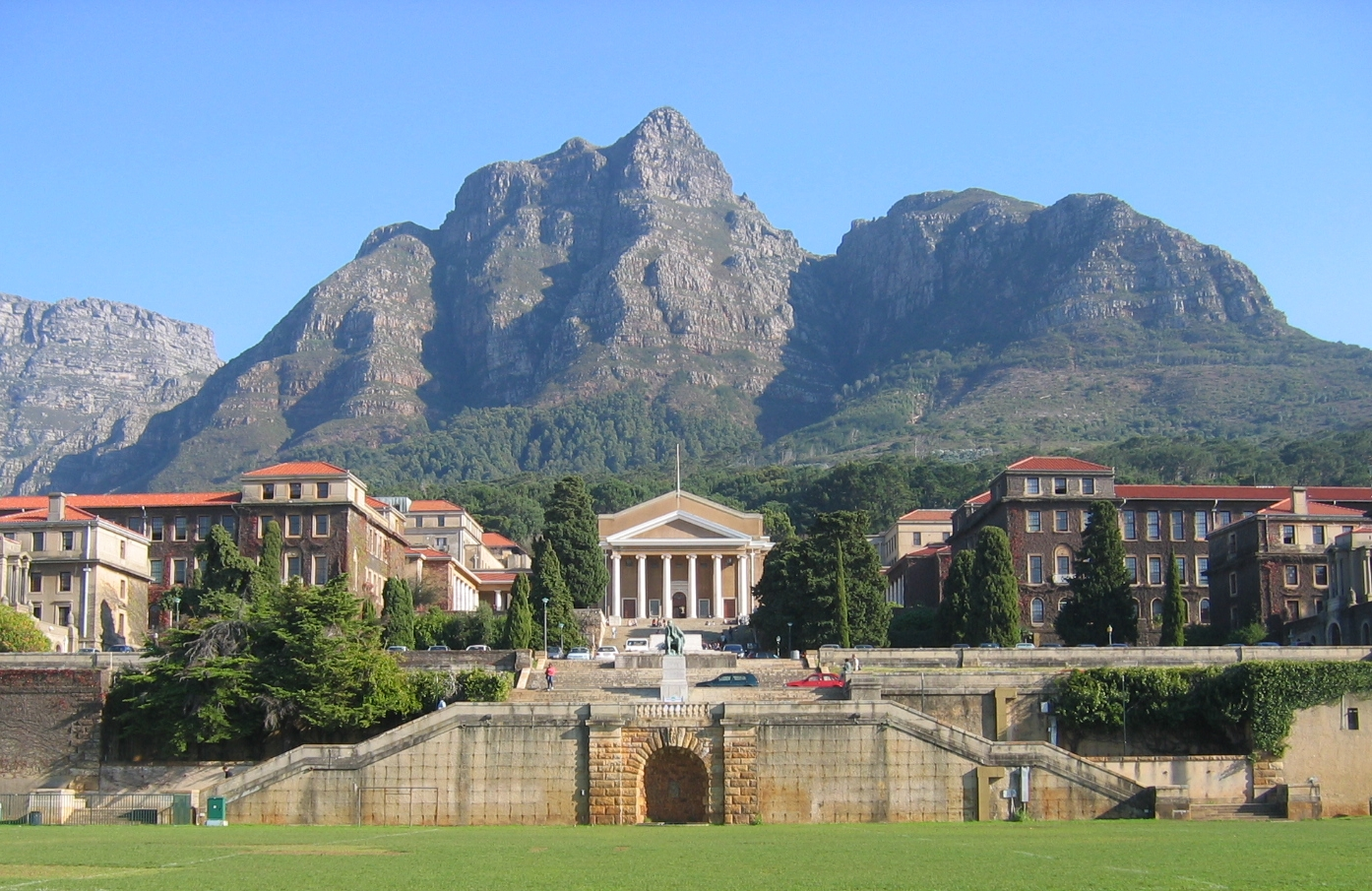
The upper campus of the University of Cape Town, where O'Regan studied for five years, worked as a lecturer at the start of her career, and is now an honorary professor.

O'Regan studied at the University of Cape Town from 1975 to 1980, earning a B.A. and LL.B. She was taught briefly by Arthur Chaskalson, who had recently founded the Legal Resources Centre, and ran UCT's legal aid project, working with Mahomed Navsa of the University of the Western Cape. After earning an LLM from the University of Sydney, she returned to South Africa and began her articles of clerkship at Bowman Gilfillan. She stayed on at Bowman for two years under John Brand, specialising in labour law and land rights and representing COSATU, NUM, NUMSA and the Black Sash.

In 1985, O'Regan went to London to do a PhD at the London School of Economics on interdicts restraining strikes. On her return to South Africa in 1988, she worked at the Labour Law Unit and then became an associate professor at the University of Cape Town. She was a founder member of the Law, Race and Gender Research project and the Institute for Development Law at UCT; advised the African National Congress (of which she was a non-active member from 1991) on land claims legislation, working with Geoff Budlender, Aninka Claassens and Derek Hanekom; and served as a trustee of the Legal Resources Centre Trust. She co-edited No Place to Rest: Forced Removals and the Law in South Africa and contributed to A Charter for Social Justice: A Contribution to the South African Bill of Rights Debate.

== Judicial career ==
In 1994, O'Regan was appointed to the newly formed Constitutional Court of South Africa by Nelson Mandela. Aged only 37, O'Regan's appointment was surprising even to her. She and Yvonne Mokgoro were the only female judges on the Court for its first 13 years.

O'Regan's first majority judgment was S v Bhulwana; S v Gwadiso, where the Court for the first time suspended an order of constitutional invalidity. In 1998, she co-authored Fedsure Life Assurance Ltd v Greater Johannesburg Transitional Metropolitan Council, the Court's founding judgment on the rule of law and legality review. The first major judgment of which she was the sole author was Premier, Mpumalanga, still the leading authority on the doctrine of legitimate expectations (on which O'Regan also wrote in Ed-U-College, again in the context of the government's withdrawal of school subsidies). O'Regan's judgment in Dawood v Minister of Home Affairs, delivered in 2000, established for the first time that the right to family life is constitutionally protected and that the conferral of broad discretionary powers on government officials can be unconstitutional. But by far her most-cited contribution to administrative law is her 2004 judgment in Bato Star v Minister of Environmental Affairs and Tourism, which sets out South African law's approach to reasonableness review and judicial deference.

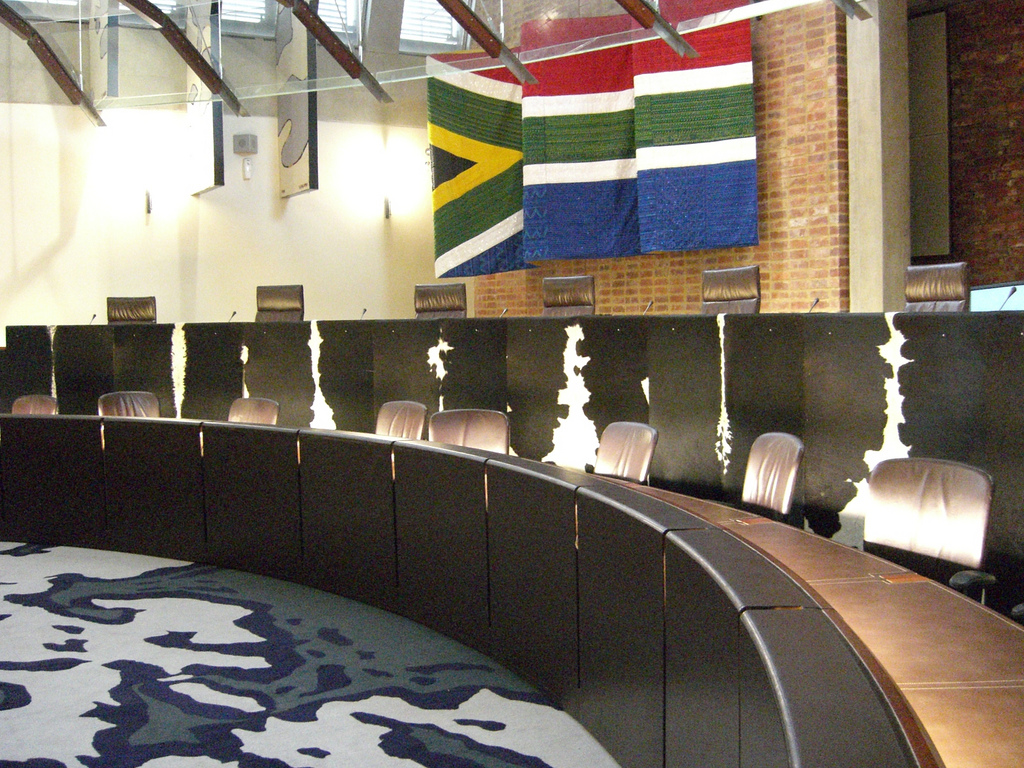
The courtroom of the Constitutional Court of South Africa

O'Regan's judgment in ACDP v Electoral Commission, dealing with the African Christian Democratic Party's application to contest the 2006 local government elections, introduced the doctrine of substantial compliance into South African law. Her judgment in Richter v Minister of Home Affairs, also on political rights, extended the right to vote to South African citizens living abroad.

O'Regan wrote several judgments on labour law, in which she had specialised as an attorney and academic. She wrote two judgments—one in 1999 and one in 2007—in the ongoing litigation between the South African National Defence Union and the South African National Defence Force, as well as NUMSA v Bader Bop, a judgment dealing with the subject of her PhD thesis: the right to strike. Her 2001 judgment on the relationship between administrative law and labour law, Fredericks v MEC for Education and Training, Eastern Cape, has effectively been overturned—to almost unanimous disapproval by commentators. In Sidumo v Rustenburg Platinum Mines Ltd, O'Regan wrote separately to emphasise, in agreement with the majority judgment of Navsa AJ, her law-clinic colleague of thirty years earlier, that administrative law applies to labour law disputes.

In the law of delict, O'Regan's contribution has been significant. In 2002, she wrote Khumalo v Holomisa, one of the Court's first judgments on defamation law and arguably its only judgment applying the Bill of Rights directly to private parties. In 2004, she delivered the Metrorail judgment, which holds that Metrorail has a duty to ensure the safety of commuters on its trains and is regarded as an "exemplar" by international commentators for its protection of the right to personal security. And in 2005, most famously, O'Regan gave judgment in K v Minister of Safety and Security, finding the state liable to compensate a plaintiff who was raped by a police officer. The judgment's radical expansion of the test for vicarious liability, following Bazley v Curry and Lister v Hesley Hall Ltd, was celebrated by women's rights groups but criticised by some academics. It has been approved and applied by the Court subsequently. The judgment is also still cited for its approach to the development of the common law and the use of comparative law. Finally, in Steenkamp NO v Provincial Tender Board, another case on the delictual liability of public authorities, O'Regan co-wrote a dissent (with Langa CJ) that would have held the state liable for pure economic loss caused to the winner of an unlawfully awarded tender.

In discrimination law, O'Regan co-authored Prinsloo v Van der Linde, which established the connection between the right to equality and dignity, and penned a unanimous judgment in the 2003 follow-up to Satchwell v President of the Republic of South Africa. Better known are her two dissents. In Minister of Home Affairs v Fourie, she strongly criticised the majority for referring the regulation of same-sex marriage to Parliament rather than providing immediate relief. And her dissent in the earlier S v Jordan (co-authored with Sachs J) held that the criminalisation of sex work (and not its solicitation) unfairly discriminates on the basis of gender and is therefore unconstitutional.

O'Regan's fifteen-year term ended in October 2009. Her last judgment for the Court, Mazibuko v City of Johannesburg, on the right to water, proved highly controversial. For some, it was a perceptively restrained summation of the Court's socio-economic rights jurisprudence; for others, it was a "disappointing" and "profoundly conservative" failure by the Court to come to the aid of South Africa's poorest communities.

Nevertheless, O'Regan was hailed on her retirement as a "stalwart" of the Court, "among its most industrious, as well as progressive, members". In the view of Johann Kriegler, her long-standing colleague, she was "the most outstanding success of the Constitutional Court". Edwin Cameron has said she is "one of the finest minds ever appointed as a judge in South Africa". After O'Regan retired, along with Pius Langa, Yvonne Mokgoro and Albie Sachs, these four founding members of the Court were replaced by President Jacob Zuma's first raft of senior judicial appointees. This significant change in the Court's composition was seen by some as marking the start of its decline.

=== Acting DCJ ===
From February to May 2008, O'Regan acted as Deputy Chief Justice in the absence of Dikgang Moseneke. It was during this period that John Hlophe allegedly approached judges Chris Jafta and Bess Nkabinde to influence their decision in litigation involving Jacob Zuma.

=== Dalai Lama controversy ===
In March 2009, the South African government refused a visa to the Dalai Lama to attend a peace conference. This perceived capitulation by the ruling African National Congress to pressure from China was widely condemned, including by then Minister of Health Barbara Hogan. O'Regan also spoke out, publicly agreeing with Hogan and expressing her "dismay" that "human rights does not seem to enter into the picture of some foreign affairs decisions that are made". O'Regan was heavily criticised by the government and the Black Lawyers Association, which threatened to lay a misconduct complaint against her for "concern[ing] herself with politics".

== Other positions and awards ==
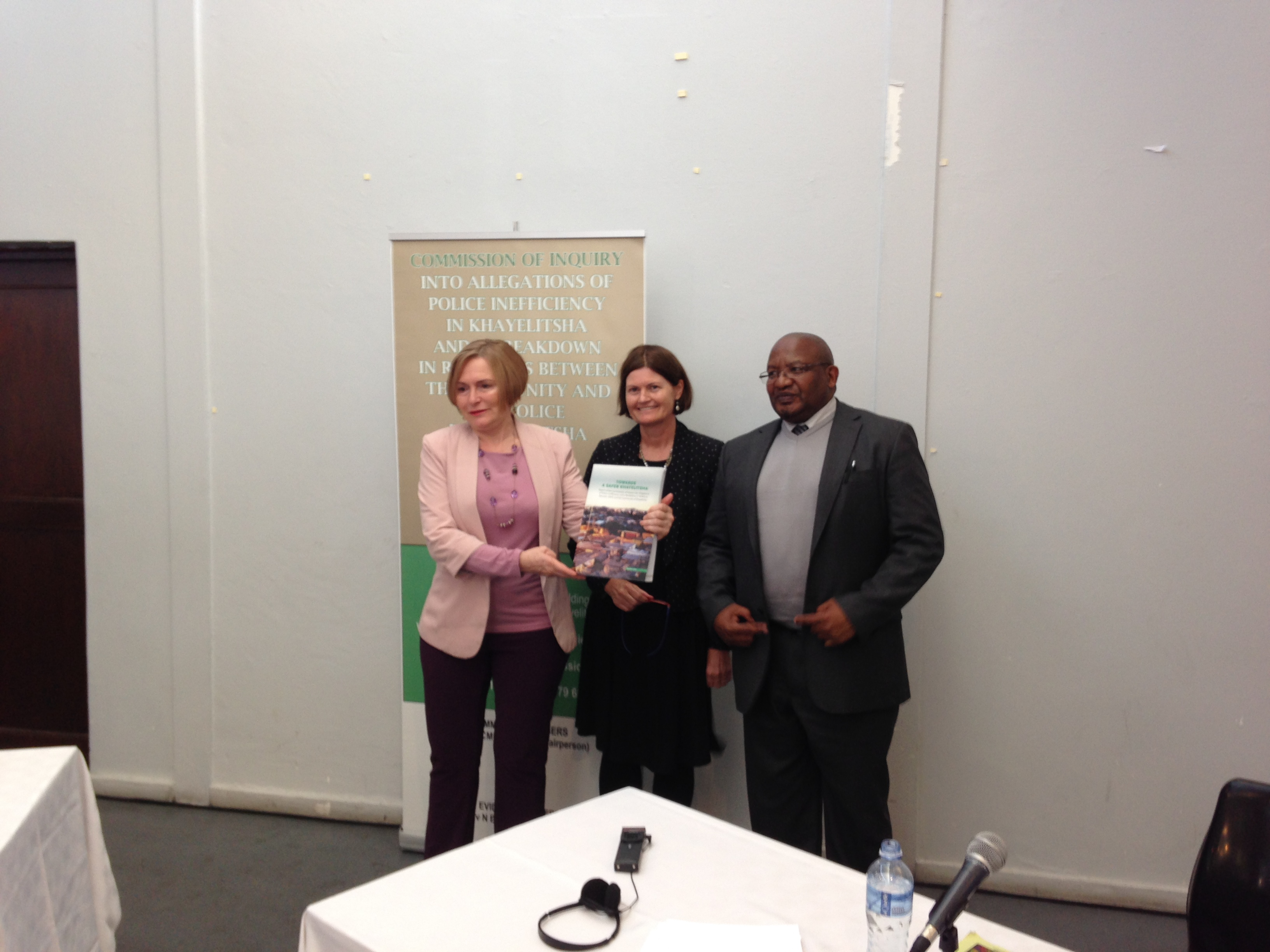
O'Regan (centre) officially hands the Khayelitsha Commission's report to Premier Helen Zille.

O'Regan is an honorary professor at the University of Cape Town and a professor at the University of Oxford, where she serves as the inaugural director of the Bonavero Institute of Human Rights, and was a Hauser Global Visiting Professor at New York University. She has four honorary doctorates (from the University of KwaZulu-Natal, University of Cape Town, London School of Economics and University of South Africa), is an honorary bencher of Lincoln's Inn and was elected an honorary foreign member of the American Academy of Arts and Sciences.

O'Regan served an ad hoc judge of the Supreme Court of Namibia. In addition, she served as the president of the International Monetary Fund Administrative Tribunal and a member of the World Bank Sanctions Board. She was the inaugural chairperson, from 2008 to 2012, of the United Nations Internal Justice Council. She is on the board of several human rights NGOs, including Corruption Watch, the Council for the Advancement of the South African Constitution, the Bingham Centre for the Rule of Law, the Equal Rights Trust and the Southern African branch of the Open Society Foundations. Since 2005, she has been closely involved with the establishment of the Southern African Legal Information Institute, a web-based law reporting system that is part of the Free Access to Law Movement.

In 2013, O'Regan was appointed by Premier Helen Zille as a commissioner, with Vusi Pikoli, of the Khayelitsha Commission, tasked with investigating the alleged breakdown of policing in Khayelitsha township. The Commission released its report in August 2014.

O'Regan consistently criticised the slow pace of gender transformation in the South African judiciary.

== Personal life ==
O'Regan is married to advocate Alec Freund SC. They have two children.

== See also ==
- List of Constitutional Court opinions of Kate O'Regan
