= Mazibuko v City of Johannesburg =

South African legal case

- Court: Constitutional Court of South Africa
- Full case name: Mazibuko and Others v City of Johannesburg and Others
- Decided: 8 October 2009
- Docket nos.: CCT 39/09
- Citations: [2009] ZACC 28; 2010 (3) BCLR 239 (CC); 2010 (4) SA 1 (CC)

Case history
- Prior actions: City of Johannesburg and Others v Mazibuko and Others [2009] ZASCA 20 in the Supreme Court of Appeal; Mazibuko and Others v City of Johannesburg and Others [2008] ZAGPHC 491 in the High Court of South Africa, Witwatersrand Local Division

Court membership
- Judges sitting: Moseneke DCJ, Cameron J, Mokgoro J, Ngcobo J, Nkabinde J, O'Regan J, Sachs J, Skweyiya J and van der Westhuizen J

Case opinions
- Decision by: O'Regan J (unanimous)

Mazibuko and Others v City of Johannesburg and Others is a landmark decision of the Constitutional Court of South Africa concerning the content of the constitutional right of access to water. It was decided on 8 October 2009 in a unanimous judgment, the last written by Justice Kate O'Regan before her retirement.

== Background ==
The applicants were five indigent residents of the township of Phiri in Soweto, which is governed by the City of Johannesburg Metropolitan Municipality. Until 2004, households in Soweto had access to an unlimited supply of water, for which they were charged at a flat rate on the basis of a deemed consumption of 20 kilolitres of water per household per month. However, according to the City of Johannesburg and its water services company, Johannesburg Water, average household water consumption in Soweto was in fact about 67 kilolitres per month, far in excess of deemed consumption, though it was not clear what proportion of the excess was consumed by residents and what proportion was lost to leakage from corroded pipes. In addition, many residents did not pay the flat-rate consumption charges, leading to a serious revenue shortfall.

To address this situation, Johannesburg Water developed the Operation Gcin'amanzi (Zulu for "Operation Conserve Water") plan, which was implemented as a pilot project in Phiri in 2004. Under the plan, the City installed pre-payment meters in households. The flat-rate pricing system was discontinued; instead, each household received a free monthly allowance of six kilolitres of water, and any consumption over that amount had to be pre-paid for.

The applicants challenged the constitutionality both of the installation of prepaid meters and of the six kilolitre limit on free basic water. They contended that six kilolitres did not fulfil their "right to have access to sufficient water", in terms of section 27(1)(b) of the Constitution, nor the state's obligation, in terms of section 27(2), to "take reasonable legislative and other measures, within its available resources, to achieve the progressive realisation" of that right. The installation of prepaid meters allowed the state to inhibit residents' access to water, and prepaid meters – unlike meters that dispensed water on credit – did not protect residents' access to water against administrative errors and household emergencies: among the applicants, Lindiwe Mazibuko's water had been disconnected erroneously for several months in 2004, and two children died in a house fire on Vusimuzi Paki's property after he was unable to access tap water with which to distinguish the blaze. Moreover, insofar as households in the majority-white suburbs of Johannesburg were permitted to install credit meters as an alternative to prepaid meters, the compulsory installation of prepaid meters in Phiri was unfair and discriminatory.

== Prior actions ==
Represented by Wim Trengove SC, the applicants applied in the High Court of South Africa to sue the City of Johannesburg, Johannesburg Water, and the national Minister for Water Affairs and Forestry. The Centre on Housing Rights and Evictions was admitted as amicus curiae. On 30 April 2008, Tsoka J of the Witwatersrand Local Division found in favour of the applicants, setting aside the six kilolitre limit on the free basic water allowance; the City of Johannesburg was ordered to provide the applicants, and all similarly situated residents of Phiri, with a free basic water allowance of 50 litres per person per day (about twice the prevailing allowance). The prepaid water system in Phiri was additionally declared unconstitutional and unlawful.

The City appealed the decision to the Supreme Court of Appeal, where its appeal was partly upheld on 25 March 2009 by Hurt AJA and Judges of Appeal Piet Streicher, Kenneth Mthiyane, Chris Jafta, and Mandisa Maya. Writing for the unanimous bench, Streicher agreed with the High Court that the prevailing free basic water allowance was insufficient to fulfil the state's obligations under section 27(1) of the Constitution. However, he held that 42 litres of water per day was "sufficient" water in terms of section 27(1). The High Court's order was therefore replaced with an order declaring that the city was obliged, to the extent that it was reasonable to do so, to provide 42 litres of water per day to each Phiri resident who could not afford to pay for such water. The city was ordered to reformulate its free water policy in light of this declaration, and in the interim it was ordered to provide each indigent Phiri resident with a free allowance of 42 litres per day. The Supreme Court also found that the use of prepaid meter was unlawful in terms of the city's prevailing Water Service By-Laws.

The applicants appealed the Supreme Court's decision to the Constitutional Court of South Africa, seeking a substantial reinstatement of the High Court's more favourable order; the City of Johannesburg and Johannesburg Water applied to cross-appeal the decision. The Constitutional Court heard arguments on 2 September 2009, and judgment was handed down on 8 October 2009.

== Judgment ==
In a judgment written by Justice Kate O'Regan, the Constitutional Court was unanimous in dismissing the applicants' appeal and upholding the city's cross-appeal, thereby setting aside the orders of both lower courts and affirming the lawfulness of the city's prevailing policy in Phiri. In contradistinction to the lower courts, the Constitutional Court declined to entertain arguments about the objective minimum quantity of water that qualified as "sufficient" for the purposes of section 27(1)(b). Instead, the Constitutional Court assessed the constitutionality of the city's policy by submitting it to reasonableness review.

This approach arose from O'Regan's finding that it was not appropriate for the courts to delineate the normative content of the section 27 right to water viz. a specific determination of a minimum amount of water that the state was obligated to ensure for all residents. As the court had found in Government v Grootboom (on the right to housing) and Minister of Health v Treatment Action Campaign (on the right of access to healthcare services), the government had a positive constitutional obligation to promote residents' socioeconomic rights, but the scope of that obligation was delineated not by a fixed "minimum core" of socioeconomic entitlement but instead by the section 27(2) requirement that the state should take "reasonable" measures, "within its available resources". Moreover, the judiciary was not well placed, either practically or constitutionally (under the separation of powers and demands of democratic accountability), to "investigate social conditions in the light of available budgets and to determine what targets are achievable in relation to social and economic rights" at any given time; that task should rest with the legislature and executive.

Thus turning to a reasonableness review, the court found that the City of Johannesburg's policy in Phiri was reasonable and lawful; both the six kilolitre free basic water allowance and the introduction of prepaid metres were compliant with section 27 of the Constitution, with the Water Services Act, 1997, and with the city's own bylaws.

== Reception and significance ==
In the summation of Wits academic Marius Pieterse, Mazibuko has been derided for its "limited conception of the role of socio-economic rights litigation, as well as for its formalist reasoning and its normatively sparse, institutionally deferent and procedurally-fixated employ of the reasonableness inquiry". Although some commentators agreed with the court that its Mazibuko ruling followed from precedent in Grootboom and Treatment Action Campaign, others viewed it as a retreat from the court's more progressive and activist stance in those cases; Judge Dennis Davis viewed it as a deviation from Grootboom's "open ended and flexible" model of reasonableness review, and Pierre de Vos described its interpretation of Treatment Action Campaign as "rather innovative" and "rather unconvincing". Indeed, Pieterse viewed Mazibuko – along with Residents of Joe Slovo Community v Thubelisha Homes and others – as part of a "second wave" of Constitutional Court jurisprudence on socioeconomic rights, defined by its increased concern with judicial deference to the political branches.
