= K v Minister of Safety and Security =

South African legal case

K v Minister of Safety and Security is an important case in the South African law of delict and South African constitutional law. It was heard by the Constitutional Court on May 10, 2005, with judgment handed down on June 13. Langa CJ, Moseneke DCJ, Madala J, Mokgoro J, O'Regan J, Sachs J, Skweyiya J, Van der Westhuizen J and Yacoob J presided. W. Trengove SC (with him K. Pillay) appeared for the applicant; PF Louw SC (with him JA Babamia) appeared for the respondent. The applicant's counsel was instructed by the Women's Legal Centre, Cape Town. The respondent's attorney was the State Attorney, Johannesburg.

The first question addressed in this case was ambit of the courts' duty to develop the common law in accordance with the spirit, purport and objects of the Bill of Rights as intended in section 39(2) of Constitution. The purpose of that section, it was determined, is to ensure that the normative value system created by the Constitution permeates the common law. The courts are bound by section 39(2) not only when contemplating a radical departure from existing common-law rules, but also when an incremental development thereof in issue.

The second and more central question was the constitutionality of the common-law principles underlying the vicarious liability of an employer for the delictual acts of his employee. The court distinguished between the principles themselves and their application. The traditional notion of the application of these principles as matter of fact untrammelled by considerations of law or normative principles was found to be constitutionally untenable. The application of the principles was accordingly in need of development to conform to the normative framework of the Constitution. This meant no more than that a court must bear in mind constitutional norms when deciding whether the case before it is in principle one in which the employer should be held liable. The principles themselves, as embodied in the present two-stage test, focusing on the subjective question as to the state of mind of the employee, together with the objective question as to whether there is a sufficient link between the conduct of the employee and the employer's enterprise, were found to be consistent with constitutional norms.

The particular question to be decided in this matter was the liability of the Minister of Safety and Security for criminal acts committed by police officers while on duty. The police officers in question had been found guilty of rape. To determine whether or not the Minister was vicariously liable, the court used a two-stage common-law test for liability, developed in light of the normative framework of the Constitution. This test, drawn from the case of Minister of Police v Rabie had both a subjective stage (evaluating the state of mind of the employee) and an objective stage (considering the link between the delict and the employer's enterprise). The policemen, subjectively viewed, were found to have acted in pursuit of their own objectives. Their conduct, however, was sufficiently linked to their employment as policemen, particularly when viewed against the background of the Constitution. The Minister, accordingly, was held to be vicariously liable.

== Facts ==
The applicant, who was brutally raped by three uniformed policemen who had given her a lift, applied for leave to appeal to the Constitutional Court against a judgment of the Supreme Court of Appeal (SCA) which held that the respondent was not vicariously liable for the policemen's conduct. The applicant based her appeal on three arguments:

- that the SCA had erred in its application of the common-law test for vicarious liability;
- that, if it had not, the test had to be developed as intended in section 39(2) of the South African Constitution; and
- that the State in any event had to be held directly liable for its failure to protect her from harm.

The applicant argued that the SCA's conclusion—that the principles of vicarious liability did not render the respondent liable—was inconsistent with the Bill of Rights, and that the principles of vicarious liability therefore had to be developed to render the respondent liable.

== Judgment ==
O'Regan J, in her decision for a unanimous court, held that the overall purpose of section 39(2) of the Constitution was to ensure that the common law was infused with constitutional values. This normative influence had to extend throughout the common law, not only to instances in which the existing rules were clearly inconsistent with the Constitution. The obligation section 39(2) imposed on the courts was extensive, therefore, and required them to be alert to the normative framework of the Constitution not only when some startling new development of the common law was in issue, but in all cases in which the incremental development of the rule was in issue.

The protection of the applicant's fundamental rights (to security of the person, dignity, privacy and substantive equality) were found to be of profound constitutional importance. It was also part of the duties of every police officer to ensure the safety and security of the public and to prevent crime. These, noted O'Regan J, were constitutional obligations affirmed by the Police Act.

O'Regan J held further that, if the principles of vicarious liability were regarded through the prism of section 39(2) of the Constitution, it became clear that to characterise their application as a matter of fact, untrammelled by any considerations of law or normative principle, could not be correct. The effect would be to sterilise the common-law test for vicarious liability and to purge it of any normative or social or economic considerations. Given the clear policy basis of the rule, as well as the fact that it was developed and applied by the courts themselves, such an approach could not be sustained under the new constitutional order. The principles of vicarious liability were imbued with social policy and normative content; their application would always prove to be difficult and require the drawing of what could be troublesome lines.

The principles of vicarious liability and their application had therefore to be developed to accord more fully with the spirit, purport and objects of the Constitution. This did not mean anything more, O'Regan J stressed, than that the existing principles of common-law vicarious liability had to be understood and applied within the normative framework of the Constitution, and the social and economic purposes which they sought to pursue. This implied that the court had to decide whether the case before it was of the kind that should, in principle, render the employer liable. Whether the principles of vicarious liability themselves required development beyond an acceptance of the normative character of their provenance and application was a different matter.

O'Regan J proceeded to investigate the common-law principles of liability. She cited the test in Minister of Police v Rabie, which focused both on the subjective state of mind of the employees and the objective question of whether or not the deviant conduct was nevertheless sufficiently connected to the employer's enterprise. This test, she noted, citing examples from England and Canada, was very similar to that employed in other jurisdictions. This test contained both a factual assessment (the question of the subjective intention of the perpetrators of the delict) and a consideration raising a question of mixed fact and law: that is to say, the objective question of whether or not the delict committed was "sufficiently connected to the business of the employer" to render the employer liable.

The objective element of the test, approached with the spirit, purport and objects of the Constitution in mind, was found to be sufficiently flexible to incorporate constitutional as well as other norms. It required the court applying it to articulate its reasoning for its conclusions as to whether there was a sufficient connection between the wrongful conduct and the employment. Thus developed, the application of the test was not at odds with the constitutional order.

It was possible, O'Regan J continued, for an employee at the same time to commit a delict for his own purposes, and neglect to perform his duties as an employee. It was clear, in the present case, that the delict for which the applicant sought to hold the respondent liable was the rape, and that the rape had been a deviation from the policemen's duties. They were, however, simultaneously omitting to perform their duties as policemen.

As to the first leg of the test, O'Regan held that, obviously, the three policemen did not rape the applicant upon the instructions of the respondent; nor did they further the respondent's purposes or obligations when they did so. They were indeed, subjectively viewed, acting in pursuit entirely of their own objectives, not those of their employer.

As to the second leg of the test, O'Regan J held that there were several important facts that pointed to the closeness of the connection between the conduct of the policemen and the business of their employer:

1. The policemen all bore a statutory and constitutional duty to prevent crime and protect the members of the public. That duty also rested on their employer, and the policemen had been employed to perform that obligation.
2. The policemen had offered to assist the applicant, and she had accepted their offer, thus placing her trust in them. The police were constitutionally obliged to protect the public and to prevent crime. In determining whether or not the Minister was liable, the importance of the constitutional role entrusted to the police, and of nurturing confidence and public trust in the police in order to ensure that their role was successfully performed, had to be kept in mind. O'Regan J found that it had been objectively reasonable of the applicant to place her trust in the policemen.
3. The conduct of the policemen had constituted both a commission and an omission: the brutal rape of the applicant and the failure to protect her from harm respectively.

"In my view," wrote O'Regan J, "these three inter-related factors make it plain that viewed against the background of our Constitution, and, in particular, the constitutional rights of the applicant and the constitutional obligations of the respondent, the connection between the conduct of the policemen and their employment was sufficiently close to render the respondent liable."

It was decided, accordingly, that the respondent was vicariously liable to the applicant for the wrongful conduct of the policemen, and that the issue of whether or not the respondent was directly liable to the applicant did not arise. Leave to appeal was granted.
