= Tholie Madala =

South African judge (1937–2010)

Justice of the Constitutional Court
- In office October 1994 – October 2008
- Appointed by: Nelson Mandela
- Preceded by: Court established
- Succeeded by: Edwin Cameron

Personal details
- Born: Tholakele Hope Madala; 13 July 1937 Kokstad, Union of South Africa
- Died: 25 August 2010 (aged 73)
- Education: University of Fort Hare; University of Natal

Tholakele Hope "Tholie" Madala (13 July 1937 – 25 August 2010) was a judge of the Constitutional Court of South Africa between October 1994 and October 2008. He was appointed to the court by Nelson Mandela upon the court's inception. Before that, he practised as a human rights lawyer in the Transkei, taking silk in 1993, and served briefly in the Mthatha Supreme Court in 1994. He retired from the bench in 2008.

== Early life and education ==
Madala was born on 13 July 1937 in Kokstad on the border between the former Cape and Natal Provinces. He matriculated in 1956 at St John's College in Mthatha, Eastern Cape and went on to the University of Fort Hare, where he completed a Bachelor of Arts and a postgraduate teaching diploma. He spent the next decade as a high school teacher, first at the Lovedale Institute in Alice from 1961 to 1962 and then at St Michael's School in Manzini, Swaziland from 1963 to 1971.

Thereafter, in 1972, he enrolled at the University of Natal to study law. He studied at the university's Pietermaritzburg campus, where he helped establish the legal aid clinic. He graduated with an LLB in 1974.

== Legal practice ==
After graduating from the University of Natal, Madala served his articles of clerkship at Venn Nemeth & Hart in Pietermaritzburg. In 1977, he was admitted as an attorney of the Transkei and Natal Divisions of the Supreme Court, and he joined the firm of Madikizela, Madala & Mdlulwa the following year. Between 1977 and 1980, he also lectured part-time at the University of Transkei, where he taught private law.

In 1982, he was admitted as an advocate, and he practised as an advocate in the Transkei for the next 12 years, taking silk in 1993. He was known for his involvement in human rights cases, and he was a co-founder both of the Umtata Law Clinic, for impoverished residents of the Transkei, and of the Prisoners' Welfare Programme, for political detainees and their families. In addition, he was active in the Transkei Society of Advocates, serving as its vice-chairperson from 1987 to 1990 and as its chairperson from 1991 to 1993.

On 1 January 1994, with the end of apartheid, Madala was appointed as a judge of the Mthatha High Court (then still a division of the Supreme Court). He was the first black judge in the Eastern Cape and the fourth black judge in South Africa. He served in the High Court only briefly before being elevated to the appellate court.

== Constitutional Court: 1994–2008 ==
In October 1994, President Nelson Mandela appointed Madala as a judge in the newly inaugurated post-apartheid Constitutional Court of South Africa. His appointment, announced in August 1994, was criticised as an example of tokenism by some commentators, who argued that it was only because of affirmative action that Madala had been elevated ahead of such white jurists as John Didcott. In response to this criticism, Dumisa Ntsebeza of the Black Lawyers Association mounted a fiery public defence of Madala.

As a member of the inaugural bench under Chief Justice Arthur Chaskalson, Madala was tasked with overseeing the design of the justices' robes.

=== Opinions ===
In his early years in the court, Madala wrote concurring judgements in the landmark matters of S v Makwanyane and Soobramoney v Minister of Health, drawing in the former case on the value of ubuntu, which he said "permeates the Interim Constitution". Notable majority judgements written by him included the court's unanimous judgement in Satchwell v President, which found that the equality clause of the Bill of Rights entitled judges' same-sex partners to the same financial benefits available to opposite-sex spouses.

He also wrote the court's majority judgments in S v Rens, East Zulu Motors v Empangeni/Ngwelezane Transitional Local Council, Osman v Attorney-General for the Transvaal, S v Manamela (co-written with Albie Sachs, and Zak Yacoob), S v Niemand, S v Basson (co-written with Laurie Ackermann, Yvonne Mokgoro, Dikgang Moseneke, Sandile Ngcobo, and Kate O'Regan), SABC v National Director of Public Prosecutions (co-written with Pius Langa, Dumile Kondile, Bess Nkabinde, O'Regan, Belinda van Heerden, and Yacoob), NM v Smith, and Nyathi v MEC for Health, Gauteng.

=== Retirement ===
Madala retired from the Constitutional Court in October 2008 after 14 years on the bench. Justice Edwin Cameron was appointed to replace him later that year.

== Personal life and death ==
He was married to Patricia Alice Ndileka Madala, who was an advocate of the High Court before leaving practice; they had three children.

He was a member of the Anglican Church of Southern Africa, serving as its deputy chancellor and as the chancellor of the Anglican Diocese of St John in Mthatha.

He was a trustee, until his death, of the Black Lawyers Association's legal education centre. In addition, until his appointment to the bench, he was the deputy chairperson of the Transkei National Building Society.

He died on 25 August 2010. Chief Justice Sandile Ngcobo called for a moment of silence in his honour during the next day's Constitutional Court sitting, and he was buried in Mthatha.
