= Laurie Ackermann =

South African judge (1934–2024)

Justice of the Constitutional Court
- In office August 1994 – January 2004
- Appointed by: Nelson Mandela

Judge of the Supreme Court
- In office January 1993 – August 1994
- Division: Cape Provincial
- In office October 1980 – September 1987
- Division: Transvaal Provincial

Personal details
- Born: Lourens Wepener Hugo Ackermann; 14 January 1934 Pretoria, Transvaal; Union of South Africa
- Died: 25 May 2024 (aged 90) Cape Town, South Africa
- Spouse: Denise Ackermann (m. 1958)
- Education: Pretoria Boys High School; Stellenbosch University; Worcester College, Oxford

Lourens Wepener Hugo "Laurie" Ackermann (14 January 1934 – 25 May 2024) was a South African judge who served on the Constitutional Court of South Africa from 1994 to 2004. Appointed to the inaugural court by Nelson Mandela, he is best known for his jurisprudence on dignity. He was formerly an academic, a practising advocate, and a judge of the Supreme Court of South Africa.

Born in Pretoria, Ackermann practised at the Pretoria Bar between 1958 and 1980, gaining silk status in 1975. He served as a judge in the Transvaal Provincial Division of the Supreme Court between 1980 and 1987, when he resigned due to his opposition to apartheid legislation. After five years as a professor in human rights law at Stellenbosch University, he returned to the Supreme Court in 1993, sitting in the Cape Provincial Division until he was elevated to the Constitutional Court in August 1994. He retired from the judiciary in January 2004.

== Early life and education ==
Ackermann was born on 14 January 1934 in Pretoria in the former Transvaal. Both of his parents were Afrikaners, but he was raised bilingual. He matriculated from Pretoria Boys High School in 1950 and attended Stellenbosch University, where he completed a Bachelor of Arts in law in 1953. In 1954, he went to Oxford University as the Cape Rhodes Scholar, reading for a Bachelor of Arts in jurisprudence. Thereafter he returned to Stellenbosch University to complete his LLB in 1957.

== Apartheid-era career ==
In the first half of 1958, Ackermann clerked for Justice Faure Williamson of the Supreme Court of South Africa. Then, between 1958 and 1980, he practised as an advocate at the Pretoria Bar. He gained silk status in 1975 and served stints on the Pretoria Bar Council and the General Council of the Bar. He first acted as a judge in August 1976, and in October 1980 he was permanently appointed to the bench of the Transvaal Provincial Division of the Supreme Court of South Africa. During this period, he was also the national vice-president of the National Institute for the Prevention of Crime and the Rehabilitation of Offenders.

In September 1987, he retired from the bench in order to take up an academic appointment at his alma mater, becoming the Harry Oppenheimer Chair in Human Rights Law at Stellenbosch University. The chair was newly established with an endowment from the Oppenheimer Foundation, and his students included future legal scholar Pierre de Vos. Ackermann later said that he left the bench when, partly due to the influence of human rights law expert Louis Henkin, he came to endorse a "total rejection of apartheid" and of the sovereignty of the apartheid-era Parliament. According to Ackermann, he was forced to resign because State President P. W. Botha would not permit him to take early retirement.

He held his position at Stellenbosch until the end of 1992, and during that time he was a visiting scholar at Columbia University and the Max Planck Institute for Comparative Public Law. He also served on the highest courts of two neighbouring countries: he was a judge of the Lesotho Court of Appeal from 1988 to 1992 and an acting judge on the Namibian Supreme Court from 1991 to 1992.

In January 1993, during the negotiations to end apartheid, Ackermann accepted reappointment to the South African Supreme Court, now in the Cape Provincial Division. He chaired the Cape Electoral Appeal Tribunal during the first post-apartheid elections of April 1994.

== Constitutional Court: 1994–2004 ==
In August 1994, Ackermann became one of five judges whom post-apartheid President Nelson Mandela appointed to the inaugural bench of the newly established Constitutional Court of South Africa. The court's first term began in February 1995 and Ackermann sat in the court until his retirement in January 2004. Throughout his time on the bench, he chaired the Constitutional Court's library committee.

Ackermann played a central role in the development of the court's early jurisprudence on dignity and its relationship to equality and non-discrimination doctrine. He was also renowned for his expertise in comparative constitutionalism. He was described as a judicial maximalist, and Drucilla Cornell argued that his jurisprudence was strongly Kantian. Notable judgments written by Ackermann included National Coalition for Gay and Lesbian Equality v Minister of Justice and National Coalition for Gay and Lesbian Equality v Minister of Home Affairs, historic judgments on sexual-orientation discrimination which set the precedent for the subsequent legalisation of same-sex marriage in Minister of Home Affairs v Fourie.

In January 2004, upon turning 70, Ackermann retired from the bench. His final judgment, handed down in December 2003, was Shaik v Minister of Justice and Constitutional Development and Others, in which he struck down businessman Schabir Shaik's application to have provisions of the National Prosecuting Authority Act – which had been used to question Shaik about Arms Deal corruption – declared incompatible with the right to silence.

== Retirement and other activities ==
After his retirement, Ackermann founded the South African Institute for Advanced Constitutional, Public, Human Rights and International Law, a research institute at the University of Johannesburg. In 2012, he published Human Dignity: Lodestar for Equality in South Africa, a monograph which expounds the theoretical and constitutional background to the relationship between dignity, equality, and non-discrimination.

Ackermann was formerly the chairperson of the board of governors of Pretoria Boys High School and he was later the South African secretary of the Rhodes Trust from 1988 to 2003. Stellenbosch University awarded him an honorary LLD, and he is an honorary fellow of Worcester College, Oxford.

== Personal life ==
In 1958, he married Denise du Toit, who later became a feminist theologian at the University of the Western Cape. They lived in Cape Town and had three children, two daughters and a son.

=== Death ===
Ackermann died in Cape Town on 25 May 2024, at the age of 90.
