= List of judgments of the Constitutional Court of South Africa delivered in 1995 =

The table below lists the judgments of the Constitutional Court of South Africa delivered in 1995, the first year of the court's existence.

The eleven members of the court appointed at its formation were President Arthur Chaskalson, Deputy President Ismail Mahomed, and judges Lourens Ackermann, John Didcott, Richard Goldstone, Johann Kriegler, Pius Langa, Tholie Madala, Yvonne Mokgoro, Kate O'Regan and Albie Sachs. Justice Goldstone was granted leave of absence to serve as chief prosecutor of the International Criminal Tribunal for the former Yugoslavia and the International Criminal Tribunal for Rwanda. His seat was filled over the court of the year by acting judges Sydney Kentridge, John Trengove and Bernard Ngoepe.

Case name	Citation	Date heard	Date decided
S v Zuma and Others	[1995] ZACC 1	23 February 1995	5 April 1995
A section of the Criminal Procedure Act provided that a confession recorded by a magistrate would be presumed to be made voluntarily unless the defendant could prove otherwise. The court held that this reverse onus was unconstitutional because it infringed on the right to a fair trial. Unanimous judgment by Kentridge.
S v Makwanyane and Another	[1995] ZACC 3	15–17 February 1995	6 June 1995
The court found capital punishment, except possibly for cases of treason in time of war, to be unconstitutional. Leading judgment by Chaskalson; separate concurrences by each judge.
S v Mhlungu and Others	[1995] ZACC 4	23 February 1995	8 June 1995
The court interpreted a transitional provision in the Interim Constitution relating to the handling of criminal cases that were pending when that constitution came into force on 27 April 1994, holding that such cases were subject to the human rights protections in the Interim Constitution despite a clause appearing to exclude them. Majority judgment by Mahomed (Langa, Madala, Mokgoro and O'Regan concurring); separate concurrences by Kriegler and Sachs; dissent by Kentridge (Ackermann, Chaskalson and Didcott concurring).
S v Vermaas; S v Du Plessis	[1995] ZACC 5	28 February 1995	8 June 1995
The court rejected the case on the basis that it had not been competently referred from the High Court. The question was the same as that answered in S v Mhlungu and Others. Unanimous judgment by Didcott.
S v Williams and Others	[1995] ZACC 6	24 March 1995	9 June 1995
The court found judicial corporal punishment to be unconstitutional because it violates the constitutional right to human dignity and the protection against cruel, inhuman or degrading punishment. Unanimous judgment by Langa.
Coetzee v Government of the Republic of South Africa; Matiso and Others v Commanding Officer, Port Elizabeth Prison, and Others	[1995] ZACC 7	6 March 1995	22 September 1995
The court ruled that the imprisonment of judgment debtors who fail to pay is unconstitutional. The judges were unanimous on the invality of the existing laws but divided on whether it could potentially be constitutional to imprison a debtor who was able to pay but refused. Majority judgment by Kriegler (Ackermann, Chaskalson, Madala, Mahomed and O'Regan concurring); separate concurrences by Didcott, Kentridge, Langa and Sachs (Mokgoro concurring).
Executive Council of the Western Cape Legislature and Others v President of the Republic of South Africa and Others	[1995] ZACC 8	16 August, 30 August and 14 September 1995	22 September 1995
The President used his powers under a "Henry VIII clause" in the Local Government Transition Act to amend that act by proclamation, in order to transfer control over the local government delimitation process from the provincial governments to the national government. The court held that Parliament could not constitutionally delegate to the executive the power to amend acts of Parliament, and therefore held the amendments to be invalid. The declaration of invalidity was, however, suspended for a short period to allow Parliament to deal with the situation. Majority judgment by Chaskalson. Separate concurrences by Ackermann and O'Regan, Kriegler, Langa (Didcott concurring), Mahomed (Mokgoro concurring), and Sachs. Dissent by Madala and Ngoepe.
Zantsi v Council of State, Ciskei and Others	[1995] ZACC 9	16 May 1995	22 September 1995
The court held that, under the Interim Constitution, the provincial and local divisions of the Supreme Court had no jurisdiction to inquire into the constitutionality of acts passed by the Parliament of South Africa, either before or after the commencement of the Interim Constitution. The court also held that provincial and local divisions do have jurisdiction to inquire into the constitutionality of acts passed by the legislatures of the former Transkei, Bophuthatswana, Venda and Ciskei. Unanimous judgment by Chaskalson and Trengove.
Premier of KwaZulu-Natal and Others v President of the Republic of South Africa and Others	[1995] ZACC 10	15 November 1995	29 November 1995
The government of Kwa-Zulu Natal challenged an amendment to the Interim Constitution that affected provincial powers, but the court held that the amendments were validly enacted. Unanimous judgment by Mahomed.
S v Bhulwana; S v Gwadiso	[1995] ZACC 11	12 September 1995	29 November 1995
The court held that a reverse onus provision in the Drugs and Drug Trafficking Act, in terms of which any person found in possession of more than 115 grams of dagga would be presumed to be dealing in dagga, was unconstitutional because it violated the presumption of innocence. Unanimous judgment by O'Regan.
Shabalala and Others v Attorney-General of the Transvaal and Another	[1995] ZACC 12	10 March 1995	29 November 1995
The court found the rule of "docket privilege", in terms of which all documents in the prosecution's case docket are protected from disclosure to the accused, to be incompatible with the right to a fair trial. The court also found unconstitutional the rule that the defence may not consult with government witnesses before the trial without the permission of the prosecutor. Unanimous judgment by Mahomed.
Ferreira v Levin NO and Others; Vryenhoek and Others v Powell NO and Others	[1995] ZACC 13	9 May 1995	6 December 1995
The Companies Act provided that during the winding up of a bankrupt company the directors could be summoned and required to testify on oath about the assets and debts of the company, and that their testimony could subsequently be used against them at a criminal trial. The court held that this violated the constitutional protection against self-incrimination, and ruled that testimony given during a winding-up may not be admitted at a criminal trial. Majority judgment by Ackermann; separate concurrences by Chaskalson (Didcott, Langa, Madala, Mahomed and Trengove concurring), Mokgoro, O'Regan and Sachs; dissent by Kriegler.
S v Ntuli	[1995] ZACC 14	24 August 1995	8 December 1995
A provision of the Criminal Procedure Act prohibited prisoners convicted in a magistrate's court and who did not have legal representation from appealing against their convictions, unless a judge of the Supreme Court certified that there were reasonable grounds for appeal. This did not apply to convicts not in prison, or to imprisoned convicts with legal representation. The court held that this was unconstitutional because it violated the right to a fair trial and the right to equality. Unanimous judgment by Didcott.
S v Rens	[1995] ZACC 15	19 May 1995	28 December 1995
The court considered the requirement for leave in order to appeal against a conviction by a superior court, and found that it did not violate the constitution. Unanimous judgment by Madala.
