= List of judgments of the Constitutional Court of South Africa delivered in 2015 =

The table below lists the judgments of the Constitutional Court of South Africa delivered in 2015.

The members of the court at the start of 2015 were Chief Justice Mogoeng Mogoeng, Deputy Chief Justice Dikgang Moseneke, and judges Edwin Cameron, Johan Froneman, Chris Jafta, Sisi Khampepe, Mbuyiseli Madlanga, Bess Nkabinde, Johann van der Westhuizen and Raymond Zondo. One seat was vacant due to the retirement of judge Thembile Skweyiya in May 2014. At various stages Achmat Jappie, Elias Matojane, Mahube Molemela, Monica Leeuw, Robert Nugent, Leona Theron, Zukisa Tshiqi, and Malcolm Wallis acted on the Court.

Citation	Case name	Heard	Decided	Majority author
[2015] ZACC 1	Democratic Alliance v African National Congress and Another	11 September 2014	19 January 2015	Cameron, Froneman and Khampepe
[2015] ZACC 2	President of the Republic of South Africa and Others v South African Dental Association and Another		27 January 2015	The Court
[2015] ZACC 3	F & J Electrical CC v MEWUSA obo Mashatola and Others		17 February 2015	Zondo
[2015] ZACC 4	Tebeila Institute of Leadership, Education, Governance and Training v Limpopo College of Nursing and Another		26 February 2015	The Court
[2015] ZACC 5	Paulsen and Another v Slip Knot Investments 777 (Pty) Limited	16 September 2014	24 March 2015	Madlanga
[2015] ZACC 6	Minister of Home Affairs and Others v Johnson and Others; Minister of Home Affairs and Another v Delorie and Others		24 March 2015	The Court
[2015] ZACC 7	AllPay Consolidated Investment Holdings (Pty) Ltd and Others v Chief Executive Officer of the South African Social Security Agency and Others (No. 3)	19 March 2015	24 March 2015	The Court
[2015] ZACC 8	City Power (Pty) Ltd v Grinpal Energy Management Services (Pty) Ltd and Others	18 November 2014	20 April 2015	Tshiqi (acting)
[2015] ZACC 9	Coughlan N.O. v Road Accident Fund	12 February 2015	20 April 2015	Tshiqi (acting)
[2015] ZACC 10	Pheko and Others v Ekurhuleni Metropolitan Municipality (No. 2)	12 August 2014	7 May 2015	Nkabinde
[2015] ZACC 11	Mbana v Shepstone & Wylie		7 May 2015	The Court
[2015] ZACC 12	Cross-Border Road Transport Agency v Central African Road Services (Pty) Ltd and Another	17 February	12 May 2015	Jappie (acting)
[2015] ZACC 13	Horn and Others v LA Health Medical Scheme and Another	11 November 2014	14 May 2015	Nkabinde
[2015] ZACC 14	Sarrahwitz v Martiz N.O. and Another	10 November 2014	4 June 2015	Mogoeng
[2015] ZACC 15	Chevron SA (Pty) Limited v Wilson t/a Wilson's Transport and Others	24 March 2015	5 June 2015	Madlanga
[2015] ZACC 16	Acting Speaker of the National Assembly v Teddy Bear Clinic for Abused Children and Another	7 May 2015	15 June 2015	Nkabinde
[2015] ZACC 17	South African Reserve Bank and Another v Shuttleworth and Another	3 March 2015	18 June 2015	Moseneke
[2015] ZACC 18	DE v RH		19 June 2015	Madlanga
[2015] ZACC 19	Mhlongo v S; Nkosi v S		25 June 2015	Theron (acting)
[2015] ZACC 20	Molaudzi v S		25 June 2015	Theron (acting)
[2015] ZACC 21	De Vos N.O and Others v Minister of Justice And Constitutional Development and Others		26 June 2015	Leeuw (acting)
[2015] ZACC 22	Trencon Construction (Pty) Limited v Industrial Development Corporation of South Africa Limited and Another	12 June 2015	30 June 2015	Froneman, Moseneke
[2015] ZACC 31	My Vote Counts NPC v Speaker of the National Assembly and Others	10 February 2015	30 September 2015	Khampepe, Madlanga, Nkabinde, and Theron (acting)
