= List of Constitutional Court opinions of Arthur Chaskalson =

Arthur Chaskalson served in the Constitutional Court of South Africa from its inception in 1995 until his retirement in 2005.

== Majority opinions ==
No.	Case name	Citation	Notes
2	Executive Council of the Western Cape Legislature v President	[1995] ZACC 8	
3	Zantsi v Council of State, Ciskei	[1995] ZACC 9	Co-written with John Trengove.
4	In re: National Education Policy Bill No 83 of 1995	[1996] ZACC 3	
5	Brink v Kitshoff	[1996] ZACC 9	
6	In re: KwaZulu-Natal Amakhosi and Iziphakanyiswa Amendment Bill of 1995	[1996] ZACC 15	
7	Transvaal Agricultural Union v Minister of Land Affairs	[1996] ZACC 22	
8	Minister of Justice v Ntuli	[1997] ZACC 7	
9	S v Pennington	[1997] ZACC 10	
10	S v Lawrence; S v Negal; S v Solberg	[1997] ZACC 11	
11	Soobramoney v Minister of Health, KwaZulu-Natal	[1997] ZACC 17	
12	Bruce and Another v Fleecytex Johannesburg	[1998] ZACC 3	
13	Amod v Multilateral Motor Vehicle Accidents Fund	[1998] ZACC 11	
14	Fraser v Naude	[1998] ZACC 13	
15	Fedsure Life Assurance v Greater Johannesburg Transitional Metropolitan Council	[1998] ZACC 17	Co-written with Goldstone and O'Regan.
16	Premier of the Western Cape v President	[1999] ZACC 2	
17	President v South African Rugby Football Union	[1998] ZACC 21	
18	S v Manyonyo	[1999] ZACC 14	
19	Pharmaceutical Manufacturers Association in re: Ex Parte President	[2000] ZACC 1	
20	Dormehl v Minister of Justice	[2000] ZACC 4	
21	South African Association of Personal Injury Lawyers v Heath	[2000] ZACC 22	
22	Mkangeli v Joubert	[2001] ZACC 15	
23	Minister of Public Works v Kyalami Ridge Environmental Association	[2001] ZACC 19	
24	Prince v President of the Law Society of the Cape of Good Hope	[2002] ZACC 1	Co-written with Ackermann and Kriegler.
25	Bel Porto School Governing Body v Premier of the Western Cape	[2002] ZACC 2	
26	S v Van Rooyen	[2002] ZACC 8	
27	African National Congress v United Democratic Movement	[2002] ZACC 24	
28	Minister of Home Affairs v Eisenberg & Associates	[2003] ZACC 10	
29	Minister of Home Affairs v NICRO	[2004] ZACC 10	
30	Kaunda v President	[2004] ZACC 5	
