= Ex Parte Minister of Safety and Security: In re S v Walters =

South African legal case

- Court: Constitutional Court of South Africa
- Full case name: Ex Parte Minister of Safety and Security and Others: In Re S v Walters and Another
- Decided: 21 May 2002
- Docket nos.: CCT 28/01
- Citations: [2002] ZACC 6; 2002 (4) SA 613; 2002 (7) BCLR 663

Case history
- Prior actions: High Court of South Africa, Transkei Division – S v Walters and Another 2001 (2) SACR 471; 2001 (10) BCLR 1088 (Tk)

Court membership
- Judges sitting: Chaskalson CJ, Langa DCJ, Ackermann, Kriegler, Madala, Mokgoro, O'Regan, Sachs and Yacoob JJ, Du Plessis and Skweyiya AJJ

Case opinions
- Decision by: Kriegler J (unanimous)

Ex Parte Minister of Safety and Security and Others: In Re S v Walters and Another is a 2002 decision of the Constitutional Court of South Africa concerning the use of force to arrest criminal suspects. The court invalidated section 49(2) of the Criminal Procedure Act, 1977, which provided that the killing of certain fugitive suspects constituted justifiable homicide. Writing on behalf of a unanimous court, Justice Johann Kriegler held that the Bill of Rights required that force should be used in arrests only where such force is reasonable and necessary.

== Background ==
The case originated in the murder trial of a father and son, Edward and Marvin Walters. In February 1999, they had shot and lethally wounded a burglar, who at the time was fleeing from the Walters' bakery in Lady Frere. In the murder trial, which was heard as S v Walters in the Umtata High Court, the defence argued that the killing constituted justifiable homicide in terms of section 49 of the Criminal Procedure Act, 1977 (CPA), which provided for the use of force, including lethal force, in effecting an arrest. In particular, section 49(1) provided that:

If any person authorized under this Act to arrest or to assist in arresting another, attempts to arrest such person and such person – resists the attempt and cannot be arrested without the use of force; or flees when it is clear that an attempt to arrest him is being made, or resists such attempt and flees, the person so authorized may, in order to effect the arrest, use such force as may in the circumstances be reasonably necessary to overcome the resistance or to prevent the person concerned from fleeing.

Section 49(2) provided that:

Where the person concerned is to be arrested for an offence referred to in Schedule 1 or is to be arrested on the ground that he is reasonably suspected of having committed such an offence, and the person authorized under this Act to arrest or to assist in arresting him cannot arrest him or prevent him from fleeing by other means than by killing him, the killing shall be deemed to be justifiable homicide.

In response to the Walters' defence under the CPA, prosecutors disputed the defence's factual foundation, its legal foundation, and, most pertinently, the constitutional validity of the CPA provisions on which it was founded. The High Court accepted the latter argument, holding that section 49 of the CPA was inconsistent with the Constitution to the extent that it sanctioned the use of force to prevent the flight of a suspect.

The High Court's order of constitutional invalidity was referred for confirmation to the Constitutional Court of South Africa, which heard argument on 15 November 2001. The Minister of Safety and Security and the National Commissioner of the South African Police Service both intervened, contending for the validity of the CPA provisions. The Minister of Justice was named as an interested party but supported the High Court's order and did not formally intervene; indeed, his department had recently sponsored an amendment to section 49. Finally, the non-profit Centre for the Study of Violence and Reconciliation was admitted as amicus curiae; represented by George Bizos and the Legal Resources Centre, it joined the Minister of Justice in arguing against the validity of section 49.

== Judgment ==
The Constitutional Court handed down judgment on 21 May 2002, with Justice Johann Kriegler writing on behalf of a unanimous court. The High Court's order was partly upheld. Section 49(2) of the CPA was declared to be inconsistent with the Constitution and was therefore invalidated, though only with prospective effect. However, the Constitutional Court overturned the High Court's finding that section 49(1) was unconstitutional as it applied to suspects in flight.

First, in respect of section 49(1), the Constitutional Court held that the provision should be interpreted as generally excluding the use of a firearm to effect an arrest. Instead, the use of a firearm is permitted only when the suspect poses an immediate threat of serious bodily harm or is reasonably suspected of having committed a serious crime involving or threatening such harm. Thus interpreted, section 49(1) was compliant with the Constitution and need not be struck down. In this approach, Kriegler diverged from the High Court and concurred with the Supreme Court of Appeal, which had interpreted section 49(1) in the same way in the separate matter of Govender v Minister of Safety and Security.

Second, however, the Constitutional Court found that section 49(2) authorised unjustifiable violations of three rights protected by the Bill of Rights: the right to human dignity, in section 10 of the Constitution; the right to life, in section 11; and the right to freedom and security of the person, in section 12. Kriegler held that it was self-evident that section 49 of the CPA authorised limitations of this right, and, conducting the limitations exercise, he found that those limitations were not justifiable or proportionate in terms of section 36 of the Constitution. In this respect, he observed:

What looms large in both the threshold and the limitation phases of the exercise in the present case, is that the right to life, to human dignity and to bodily integrity are individually essential and collectively foundational to the value system prescribed by the Constitution. Compromise them and the society to which we aspire becomes illusory. It therefore follows that any significant limitation of any of these rights, would for its justification demand a very compelling countervailing public interest.

In particular, Kriegler pointed out that there were alternative means of achieving the desired end of apprehending the suspect: "if the fugitive constitutes no threat to the arrester or to someone else or to the public at large and can be picked up later, there is no justification for the use of any significant force, let alone deadly force". There was therefore "a manifest disproportion between the rights infringed and the interests sought to be advanced".

Taking his findings on section 49(1) and section 49(2) together, Kriegler summarised his main findings as follows:

- The purpose of arrest is to bring before court for trial persons suspected of having committed offences.
- Arrest is not the only means of achieving this purpose, nor always the best.
- Arrest may never be used to punish a suspect.
- Where arrest is called for, force may be used only where it is necessary in order to carry out the arrest.
- Where force is necessary, only the least degree of force reasonably necessary to carry out the arrest may be used.
- In deciding what degree of force is both reasonable and necessary, all the circumstances must be taken into account, including the threat of violence the suspect poses to the arrester or others, and the nature and circumstances of the offence the suspect is suspected of having committed; the force being proportional in all these circumstances.
- Shooting a suspect solely in order to carry out an arrest is permitted in very limited circumstances only.
- Ordinarily such shooting is not permitted unless the suspect poses a threat of violence to the arrester or others or is suspected on reasonable grounds of having committed a crime involving the infliction or threatened infliction of serious bodily harm and there are no other reasonable means of carrying out the arrest, whether at that time or later.
- These limitations in no way detract from the rights of an arrester attempting to carry out an arrest to kill a suspect in self-defence or in defence of any other person.

== Significance ==
The CPA was subsequently amended to comply with the judgment. The judgment constituted the first time that the Constitutional Court had regard to the circumstances under which force may be used in self-defence.
