= Paulsen v Slip Knot =

South African legal case

- Court: Constitutional Court of South Africa
- Full case name: Paulsen and Another v Slip Knot Investments 777 (Pty) Limited
- Decided: 24 March 2015
- Docket nos.: CCT 61/14
- Citations: [2015] ZACC 5; 2015 (3) SA 479 (CC); 2015 (5) BCLR 509 (CC)

Case history
- Prior actions: Supreme Court of Appeal – Paulsen v Slip Knot [2014] ZASCA 16; High Court of South Africa, Western Cape Division – Unreported judgment of 24 February 2012; Paulsen v Slip Knot [2013] ZAWCHC 20

Court membership
- Judges sitting: Mogoeng CJ, Moseneke DCJ, Cameron J, Jafta J Khampepe J, Madlanga J, Nkabinde J, van der Westhuizen J and Leeuw AJ

Case opinions
- Decision by: Madlanga J (Jafta and Nkabinde concurring)
- Concurrence: Moseneke DCJ (Mogoeng, Khampepe, Leeuw and Van der Westhuizen concurring)
- Dissent: Cameron J

Paulsen and Another v Slip Knot Investments 777 (Pty) Limited is a decision of the Constitutional Court of South Africa. In a judgment delivered on 24 March 2015, a majority of the court overturned the Supreme Court of Appeal's decision in Standard Bank v Oneanate, which had established a pendente lite exception to the in duplum rule.

== Background ==
In July 2006, the applicants, André and Margaretha Paulsen, signed as sureties on behalf of Winskor in respect of a loan agreement for R12 million, which Winskor intended to use as bridging finance for the development of a portfolio of properties in Brooklyn, Pretoria. During the 2008 financial crisis, Winskor defaulted on the loan; it was in the process of being liquidated in 2010 when the creditor, Slip Knot Investments, instituted proceedings against the Paulsens in the High Court of South Africa. Slip Knot claimed that the Paulsens were liable for the capital sum of R12 million and fivefold that amount in accrued interest.

Judge André Blignault of the Western Cape Division upheld all of Slip Knot's claims in February 2012, but the Paulsens obtained leave to appeal to a full bench of the division. Writing on behalf of the full bench, Judge Willem Louw held in February 2013 that, contra Blignaut, the Paulsens were correct that the in duplum rule limited their liability for the payment of interest. The Paulsens appealed again, contending that Slip Knot's claim should be dismissed entirely rather than limited, and Slip Knot likewise Cross-appealed the unfavourable decision on its claims for interest. On 25 March 2014, the Supreme Court of Appeal upheld the cross-appeal, reversing the Paulsen's partial success before the full High Court; relying on Judge of Appeal Ralph Zulman's judgment in Standard Bank v Oneanate, Judge of Appeal Malcolm Wallis held for the majority that the in duplum rule is suspended pendente lite.

The Paulsens appealed to the Constitutional Court of South Africa, where the matter was heard on 16 September 2014 and decided on 24 March 2015.

== Judgments ==
The Constitutional Court filed three opinions: a main judgment, written by Mbuyiseli Madlanga with the concurrence of Justices Chris Jafta and Bess Nkabinde; a concurring majority judgment, written by Deputy Chief Justice Dikgang Moseneke and concurred in by Chief Justice Mogoeng Mogoeng, Justices Sisi Khampepe and Johann van der Westhuizen, and Acting Justice Monica Leeuw; and a dissenting judgment by Justice Edwin Cameron.

The court was unanimous that it had jurisdiction to hear the matter for reasons outlined in Madlanga's judgment. The Constitutional Court's jurisdiction had been amended by the Constitution Seventeenth Amendment Act, 2012, and Madlanga's judgment constituted the court's first attempt to interpret the new section 167(3)(b) of the Constitution, which holds that the court may hear any appeal which it decides "raises an arguable point of law of general public importance which ought to be considered by that Court".

On the merits, Madlanga and Moseneke were in agreement that Oneanate should be overturned, while Cameron held otherwise. Moseneke's majority diverged from Madlanga's judgment on the role of the judiciary in developing the common law.

== See also ==
- Credit agreements in South Africa
