= Mohamed v President of the Republic of South Africa =

South African legal case

- Court: Constitutional Court of South Africa
- Full case name: Mohamed and Another v President of the Republic of South Africa and Others
- Decided: 28 May 2001
- Citations: [2001] ZACC 18, 2001 (3) SA 893 (CC), 2001 (7) BCLR 685 (CC)

Case history
- Appealed from: Cape Provincial Division

Court membership
- Judges sitting: Chaskalson P, Ackermann, Goldstone, Kriegler, Madala, Mokgoro, Ngcobo, Sachs & Yacoob JJ, Madlanga & Somyalo AJJ

Case opinions
- Decision by: The Court

Mohamed v President of the Republic of South Africa, [2001] ZACC 18, is a 2001 decision of the Constitutional Court of South Africa dealing with the legality of the South African government's actions in handing over Khalfan Khamis Mohamed to United States authorities. The court ruled that the South African government may not extradite a suspect who may face the death penalty without seeking an assurance from the receiving country that the suspect will not be sentenced to death.

== See also ==
- Section Eleven of the Constitution of South Africa
- S v Makwanyane (abolishing the death penalty in South Africa)
- Soering v United Kingdom (similar ruling from the European Court of Human Rights)
- United States v. Burns (similar ruling from the Supreme Court of Canada)
