= S v Mamabolo =

South African legal case

- Court: Constitutional Court of South Africa
- Full case name: The State v Russell Mamabolo
- Decided: 11 April 2001
- Citations: [2001] ZACC 17, 2001 (3) SA 409, 2001 (5) BCLR 449

Case history
- Appealed from: Transvaal Provincial Division

Court membership
- Judges sitting: Chaskalson P, Ackermann, Goldstone, Kriegler, Madala, Mokgoro, Ngcobo, Sachs & Yacoob JJ, Madlanga & Somyalo AJJ

Case opinions
- Decision by: Kriegler

S v Mamabolo is a case in which the Constitutional Court of South Africa dealt with the relationship between contempt of court and freedom of speech. The court held that a person could only be convicted of "scandalising the court" for a statement made outside of the court if that statement "really was likely to damage the administration of justice". The court also held that the procedure applied in the High Court for prosecution of the offence, whereby the judge could summon the accused, question him and summarily convict him of contempt, was an unjustifiable violation of the right to a fair trial.
