= Semmes Motors, Inc. =

Motor company

Semmes Motors, Inc. was a long-term Ford Motor Company car dealership in Scarsdale, New York, founded by Williams Semmes.

== Semmes Motors, Inc. v. Ford Motor Co. Litigation ==
In 1969, Ford Motor Company suspected that Semmes Motors had issued invoices for warranty repairs that they had not actually performed. In response, Ford notified Semmes of its intention to review the dealership's warranty claims and records, inspect vehicles repaired by Semmes, and contact some customers who had received warranty work.

William Semmes was an active partner in the Ford Dealers Alliance, Inc. in New Jersey, which worked to protect Ford franchisees from abuse by the Ford Company. He believed that the audit was retaliation for his involvement in the Alliance. This resulted in a history-making and widely publicised legal battle through several court instances in 1970.

Ford provided its warranty not only to the dealer, but also directly to the end consumer on vehicles that came on the market from the autumn of 1964 onwards. If a car buyer found a defect, he thought was covered by the warranty, he could take the vehicle to the dealer, who would repair it and submit a claim to Ford for reimbursement of the cost of parts and labour. Several dealers had subsequently complained that the deterioration of quality control at the factory, difficulties in finding qualified repairmen and other factors had made it difficult to implement this concept, and Ford objected to the submission of inflated and even completely false claims for reimbursement.

Judge Sylvester Ryan concluded in a 37-page opinion on the case that the relatively small irregularities, such as the filing of allegedly false warranty service and repayment claims, compared with Ford's competitive situation with Semmes and the fact that the termination of the contractual relationship was pronounced by the highest levels of Ford's management, gave good cause for the preliminary injunction pending final judgment ("I find that these de minimis irregularities ... point to the conclusion that Semmes has made a strong case in its facour warranting the granting of injunction relief pendente lite"). He also considered the active role Semmes had taken in protecting dealers from Ford's bullying and brusque treatment, the manner and speed of the termination of the contractual relationship and the failure to give Semmes fair warning after twenty years of cooperation, the widespread publicity of the termination of the contractual relationship, and the unnecessary contact with Semmes' customers.
