= Section Eleven of the Constitution of South Africa =

Guarantees the right to Life

Section Eleven of the Constitution of South Africa, part of the Bill of Rights, guarantees the right to life. This section has been interpreted to prohibit the death penalty, but not to prohibit abortion. It also has important implications for euthanasia, self-defence, the use of force by law enforcement, and the provision of life-saving healthcare.

Under the heading "Life", the section states, in full, "Everyone has the right to life." Unlike the right to life in many other human rights instruments, this section is unqualified; it does not make an exception for the death penalty, but neither does it explicitly state that the death penalty is forbidden.

== Death penalty ==
One of the first decisions by the Constitutional Court was the 1995 case of S v Makwanyane, in which the court addressed the constitutionality of the death penalty. The principal judgment, by President of the Court Arthur Chaskalson, found the death penalty to be unconstitutional not because it violated the right to life, but because it violated the prohibition of cruel, inhuman and degrading punishment elsewhere in the Bill of Rights. However, a majority of the judges of the court held that the death penalty also violated the right to life.

In the 2001 case of Mohamed v President of the Republic of South Africa the Constitutional Court dealt with the extradition of suspects under circumstances where they may face the death penalty. The court held that the South African government cannot extradite suspects for capital offences without obtaining an assurance from the jurisdiction requesting extradition that they will not be sentenced to death (or that, if they are, the death penalty will not be carried out). This was reaffirmed in the 2012 case of Minister of Home Affairs v Tsebe. However these protections do not extend to South African citizens outside South Africa: in Kaunda v President of the Republic of South Africa the court held that the South African government was not obliged to intervene diplomatically to protect South African citizens being extradited from Zimbabwe to Equatorial Guinea on capital charges.

== Abortion ==
The Choice on Termination of Pregnancy Act, 1996, which permits elective abortions in the first trimester and for broadly-specified reasons in the second trimester, was challenged in Christian Lawyers' Association v Minister of Health, on the basis that it violated the foetus' right to life. The Transvaal Provincial Division of the High Court dismissed the case, ruling that the word "everyone" in section 11 does not extend to unborn foetuses, which do not have legal personality under the Bill of Rights.
