= Soobramoney v Minister of Health, KwaZulu-Natal =

South African legal case

- Court: Constitutional Court of South Africa
- Full case name: Thiagraj Soobramoney v Minister of Health, KwaZulu-Natal
- Decided: 27 November 1997
- Citations: [1997] ZACC 17, 1998 (1) SA 765 (CC), 1997 (12) BCLR 1696 (CC)

Case history
- Appealed from: Durban and Coast Local Division

Court membership
- Judges sitting: Chaskalson P, Langa DP, Ackermann, Didcott, Goldstone, Kriegler, Madala, Mokgoro, O'Regan & Sachs JJ

Case opinions
- Decision by: Chaskalson

Soobramoney v Minister of Health, KwaZulu-Natal is an important judgment of the Constitutional Court of South Africa, delivered in 1997, and the first in which the court had to adjudicate on the universal constitutional right to medical treatment as against the problem of an under-resourced health care system.

== Facts ==
Thiagraj Soobramoney was terminally ill, suffering from ischaemic heart disease and cerebrovascular disease, and of limited means. His kidneys had failed in 1996, and his condition had been diagnosed as irreversible. To survive even for a while, he required renal dialysis. After exhausting his funds on private providers, he sought the treatment free from the dialysis program of the Addington Hospital, a state-funded institution in Durban, which rejected him on the grounds that his condition did not fulfill the requirements for eligibility: that he be curable within a short period of time, and that, as for his kidney failure, he be eligible for a kidney transplant. (Addington, like many other South African hospitals, had a severe shortage of resources.) Soobramoney brought an application to the Durban High Court for an order that Addington give him the necessary treatment, citing section 27(3) Constitution of South Africa which gives everyone the right not to be "refused emergency medical treatment," and section 11 Constitution of South Africa insisting also on his constitutionally-protected right to life.

== Judgment ==
The High Court dismissed his application, and he appealed to the Constitutional Court, which found Addington's standards to be reasonable and in his case fairly applied, and unanimously dismissed his appeal on the grounds that his non-treatment did not constitute a violation of his rights. While the court confirmed the state's constitutional duty to provide care, it found that, were Soobramoney to be given the full benefit of this, everyone else in his position would have to benefit as well; and that the state's limited resources could not accommodate such a burden. Biweekly renal dialysis, needed by Soobramoney to stay alive, would cost some R60,000 a year at the time (equivalent to R240,000 in 2018). To expand the programme to everyone who needed it would have a severe impact on the health budget, and would impinge on the state's other obligations.

The court held, therefore, that the right to emergency medical treatment had only limited meaning: One who suffers a sudden catastrophe, which calls for immediate medical attention, should not be denied the available emergency services, and should not be turned away from a hospital equipped to administer the necessary treatment. The court ruled that Soobramoney's situation, an "ongoing state of affairs," was not as such an "emergency." His case fell instead under sections 27(1) and (2) of the Constitution, which deal with the allocation of non-emergency medical treatment, and which are qualified by the availability of resources. Because Addington's resources were limited, its policy was to admit only those patients who could be cured quickly, and those with chronic renal failure who are eligible for a kidney transplant. The court ruled that it could not interfere with the good-faith decisions of political organs and medical authorities as to the allocation of budgets and priorities.

Nor could the right be taken to mean that the treatment of terminal illnesses had to be prioritised over other forms of medical care such as preventative health care. The court held further that the right to emergency medical treatment was independent of and not therefore inferable from the right to life, as section 27 of the Constitution deals specifically with health rights. These were to be interpreted in the context of the availability of health services generally, with the implication that there was room to challenge executive policies if they were unreasonable or applied unfairly.

== Significance ==
Concerns arose after this ruling that the court had frustrated the prospects of the poor and the socially-disadvantaged. The Constitutional Court acknowledged that it was a "hard and unpalatable fact" that Mr. Soobramoney could receive the treatment if he would have been wealthy. Its 2001 decision in Government v Grootboom, however, held the state to a much more rigorous standard for "reasonableness," requiring that it give consideration to the needs of the most disadvantaged in the fulfilment of its constitutional obligations. The Grootboom case concerned the right to social housing.

The Grootboom reasonableness test was applied by the Constitutional Court in the Minister of Health v Treatment Action Campaign case (2002). The claimant argued that the Ministry of Health infringed section 27(3) Constitution of South Africa by failing to distribute the free medicine nevirapine that could prevent mother-to-child transmission of HIV. The Court agreed, explaining that the reasonableness test guaranteed that those people with financial issues would not be excluded from emergency health care when their life is in danger.

Thiagraj Soobramoney died shortly after the court returned its decision.

== Other countries ==
The South African Constitutional Court referred to a 1996 case of the Indian Supreme Court on access to emergency health care in the Soobramoney case. In 2017, the European Court of Human Rights also recognised that there exists a right to access to emergency health care in the member states of the Council of Europe. The Council of Europe member states have a positive obligation to protect this right under Article 2 of the European Convention on Human Rights that protects the right to life.
