= South African jurisprudence =

Study of South African law

South African jurisprudence refers to the study and theory of South African law. Jurisprudence has been defined as "the study of general theoretical questions about the nature of laws and legal systems."

South African jurisprudence is an evolving field that reflects the country's legal history and societal changes. It is grounded in a blend of Roman-Dutch law, English common law, and indigenous African customary law, all underpinned by the Constitution of 1996.

In the South African context, Ubuntu- based jurisprudence has been considered to be at the forefront of human rights discourse in the region, even prior to the European Enlightenment.

== Key Aspects of South African Jurisprudence ==
=== Constitutional Supremacy ===
South Africa's legal system is founded on constitutional supremacy, which means that all laws and actions by the state must comply with the Constitution. The Constitution is the highest law and includes a comprehensive Bill of Rights that protects the civil, political, and socio-economic rights of all individuals. The Constitutional Court interprets the Constitution and determines whether laws and state actions are constitutional.

=== Judicial Review and Human Rights ===
Judicial review in South Africa allows the courts to assess the constitutionality of legislative and executive actions. In the landmark case S v Makwanyane, the Constitutional Court ruled that capital punishment was inconsistent with the right to life and human dignity, abolishing the death penalty. The ruling reflected the Constitution's emphasis on human dignity, equality, and freedom, and set a precedent for human rights protection.

=== Bill of Rights ===
The Bill of Rights, contained in Chapter Two of the Constitution, applies to all law and binds all branches of government. It enshrines rights that can be enforced directly or indirectly through the courts. Direct application occurs when a specific right is invoked in a case, while indirect application influences the interpretation and development of all laws to be consistent with constitutional values.

=== Delictual Liability ===
In the realm of private law, South African jurisprudence covers delictual liability, which is akin to tort law in other jurisdictions. This area deals with wrongful acts that cause harm to individuals, requiring a demonstration of harm, wrongful conduct, causation, and fault. The law of delict ensures that victims of harm can seek redress and compensation.

== Notable Cases ==
=== S v Makwanyane (1995) ===
The Constitutional Court abolished the death penalty, emphasizing the right to life and dignity as fundamental human rights.

=== Government of the Republic of South Africa v Grootboom (2000) ===
The Constitutional Court established the state's obligation to progressively realize socio-economic rights, such as the right to housing.

=== Minister of Health v Treatment Action Campaign (2002) ===
The Constitutional Court addressed the right to healthcare, requiring the government to provide antiretroviral drugs to prevent mother-to-child transmission of HIV.

== Ubuntu Jurisprudence and its specificity ==
The word ‘ubuntu’ does not feature in the 1996 South African Constitution, which created a perception that the African philosophy had been excised from the law of the land; this has been a point of criticism of the Constitution. This criticism is discussed in essays including ‘Tensions in legal and religious values in the 1996 South African Constitution’.

This criticism has itself been challenged on the grounds that it presupposes that the 'moral fabric' of African society is absent from the Constitution. An alternative interpretation, based on the substance of the Constitution and its prioritisation of human rights, holds that "Although the Constitution did not expressly mention ubuntu, a teleological interpretation or an investigation of its intent reveals that the Constitution carries within it the spirit of ubuntu. In this respect it calls for equality, dignity, nondiscrimination and all other fundamental rights recorded in the Bill of Rights."

== See also ==
- Jurisprudence
- South African law
