= Mbuyiseli Madlanga =

Justice of the Constitutional Court of South Africa

The Honourable Mbuyiseli Madlanga

Deputy Chief Justice of South Africa
- Acting
- In office 1 September 2024 – 31 July 2025
- Appointed by: Cyril Ramaphosa
- Preceded by: Mandisa Maya
- Succeeded by: Dunstan Mlambo

Justice of the Constitutional Court of South Africa
- In office 1 August 2013 – 31 July 2025
- Appointed by: Jacob Zuma
- In office 15 August 2000 – 31 May 2001

Judge of the High Court of South Africa, Transkei Division
- In office 1 September 1996 – 31 May 2001
- Appointed by: Nelson Mandela

Personal details
- Born: 27 March 1962 (age 64) Mount Frere, Cape Province
- Education: University of Transkei; Rhodes University; University of Notre Dame

Mbuyiseli Russel Madlanga (born 27 March 1962) is a retired South African judge who served as a justice of the Constitutional Court of South Africa from 2013 to 2025. At the time of his retirement, he had served as Acting Deputy Chief Justice of South Africa, following the elevation of Mandisa Maya to Chief Justice. Since leaving the bench, he has chaired the Madlanga Commission.

He joined the Constitutional Court bench on 1 August 2013 on the appointment of President Jacob Zuma. Formerly an advocate in the Eastern Cape, he first served as a judge in the Transkei Division between 1996 and 2001.

Madlanga was appointed Chancellor of Rhodes University on 10 October 2025, replacing former Chancellor, Lex Mpati.

== Early life ==
Madlanga was born in 1962 in Njijini village, Mount Frere, to a family of the amaHlubi. He attended Mariazell High School in Matatiele. His father, a teacher, encouraged him to apply for a bursary to read law at the University of Transkei, where he completed a BJuris in 1981 in an atmosphere of growing social unrest. During his final year he began working in a magistrate's office, though he was close friends with African National Congress activists under investigation by his colleagues.

In 1985 he moved to Grahamstown, then in a state of "complete chaos", and completed an LLB at Rhodes University the following year. From 1987 to 1989 he worked as a law lecturer at the University of Transkei, teaching customary law, the law of delict and the law of contract. He won a scholarship to attend the University of Notre Dame and completed his LLM there in 1990. For the next six months he worked in the Washington, D.C. office of Amnesty International, where he briefly met Nelson Mandela after his release from prison.

== Legal career ==
In 1991, amid the negotiations to end apartheid, Madlanga returned to South Africa and began practice as an advocate in Mthatha. His admission to the Bar was moved by his close friend and mentor Tholie Madala; Sandile Ngcobo, with whom Madlanga would also later work at the Constitutional Court of South Africa, was a colleague and friend of both.

On 1 September 1996, Madlanga was appointed to the bench of the Transkei Division of the High Court (now the Mthatha seat of the Eastern Cape Division). He later became its acting Judge President. From 1998 to 1999, he was an acting judge on the Supreme Court of Appeal.

The following year he became an acting judge of the Constitutional Court upon Arthur Chaskalson's invitation. He was on the bench in Mohamed v President of the Republic of South Africa, which held that the South African government may not extradite a suspect who may face the death penalty unless it receives an assurance it will not be imposed; Prince v President, Cape Law Society, which upheld a law criminalising the use of marijuana, even for religious reasons; Carmichele v Minister of Safety and Security; Minister of Public Works v Kyalami Ridge Environmental Association; and S v Mamabolo. Madlanga authored S v Steyn, which declared unconstitutional provisions of the Criminal Procedure Act, 1977 that removed an accused person's automatic right of appeal against a magistrate's court conviction.

The main facade of the Constitutional Court of South Africa

In 2001, Madlanga resigned from the bench, saying the salary was insufficient to support his family, and returned to private practice. He appeared for South Africa at the International Court of Justice in the case regarding the Israeli West Bank barrier. He also served as evidence leader at the commission of inquiry into the fitness of Bheki Cele to hold office as national police commissioner, and at the Farlam Commission investigating the Marikana miners' strike.

=== Justice of the Constitutional Court ===
On 1 August 2013, Madlanga was appointed permanently to the Constitutional Court, replacing Zak Yacoob. His appointment had been widely expected, especially after he impressed at his interview before the Judicial Service Commission (on which Madlanga had served since 2010), though some felt a woman ought to have been appointed. The Judicial Service Commission questioned him on his 1998 judgment in Bangindawo v Head of the Nyanda Regional Authority, in which he had held controversially that there was "no reason whatsoever for the imposition of the western conception of the notions of judicial impartiality and independence in the African customary law setting". Madlanga admitted at the interview that this judgment was wrong.

Madlanga's first judgment for the Constitutional Court was Gaertner v Minister of Finance, on the right to privacy and search and seizure. In March 2014, he wrote a 94-paragraph judgment dismissing Uruguayan businessman Gaston Savoi's challenge to his prosecution on charges of corruptly procuring a contract from the KwaZulu-Natal government. A year later, Madlanga delivered the controversial main judgment in Paulsen v Slip Knot, which removes an exception to the in duplum rule. This judgment was described as "consumer friendly", but marked a "sea change" for South African banking practice, and was strongly criticised extra-curially by Malcolm Wallis. Madlanga's next judgment for the Court was DE v RH, which abrogated the action for adultery. Madlanga was one of the authors of the majority judgment in the 2015 My Vote Counts v Speaker, which was widely condemned.

Following the appointment of Mandisa Maya as Chief Justice of South Africa, Madlanga acted as Deputy Chief Justice. He held this acting role from September 2024 until his retirement in July 2025.

=== Nomination to position of Chief Justice ===
On 4 October 2021, President Cyril Ramaphosa announced that Madlanga was one of eight nominees under consideration to succeed Mogoeng Mogoeng as Chief Justice of South Africa. The position was ultimately filled by Raymond Zondo.

=== Madlanga Commission ===
In September 2025, Madlanga chaired the Madlanga Commission, or formally the Judicial Commission of Inquiry into Criminality, Political Interference, and Corruption in the Criminal Justice System. This is a public inquiry established by President Cyril Ramaphosa to investigate allegations made by KwaZulu-Natal Provincial Police Commissioner Lieutenant General Nhlanhla Mkhwanazi of collusion and corruption between politicians, senior police, prosecutors, intelligence operatives and elements of the judiciary, in South Africa.

== Personal life ==
Madlanga's wife is Nosisi Monica Madlanga (born Nkenkana). He has seven children.
