= Abortion in South Africa =

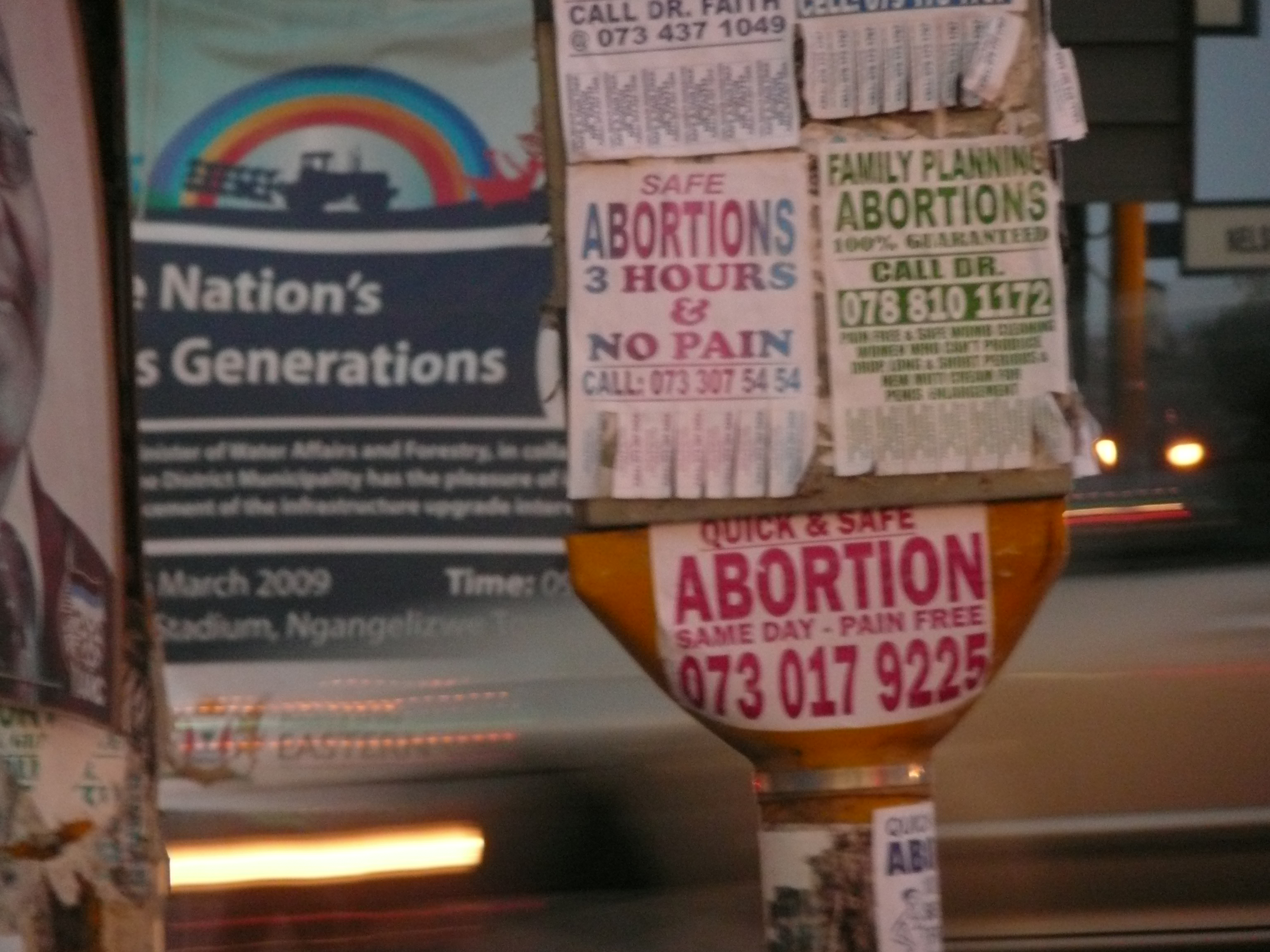
Ads for illegal abortion clinics in East London, South Africa

Abortion in South Africa is legal by request (no reason needs to be provided) when the pregnancy is under 13 weeks. It is also legal to terminate a pregnancy between weeks 13 and 20 if the continued pregnancy would significantly affect the woman's social or economic circumstances, poses a risk of injury to the woman's physical or mental health, there is a substantial risk that the foetus would have a severe physical or mental problems, or the pregnancy resulted from rape or incest. If the pregnancy is more than 20 weeks, a termination is legal if the foetus' life is in danger, or there is a likelihood of serious birth defects.

Abortion is provided for free at some government hospitals and clinics. A request for this service must be made at a primary healthcare clinic and a referral letter will be provided to a facility that offers abortion care. Abortion is provided for a fee at private clinics. Marie Stopes South Africa and Abortion Support South Africa provide abortion pills for home-use (self-managed abortion) across the country.

== History ==
=== Pre-colonial South Africa ===
Abortions and infant exposure were common and widespread practices in pre-colonial South Africa amongst the Bantu-speaking people and the Khoisan people. They understood personhood as beginning long after birth and they believed that young infants "..are but water, they are but a womb," and thus it was taboo to mourn for or give normal burial rites to natural miscarriages, stillbirths and other infant deaths. During times of deprivation, infanticide was permitted to preserve resources, especially amongst the Khoikhoi and the San who were nomadic and could not care for more than two young children at a time. It was common practice amongst the Bantu-speaking people to kill twins and deformed children or infants with albinism.

According to Hugh A. Stayt, author of a 1931 ethnographic book about the VhaVenda people called The Bavenda:

The fear of a woman who has had an abortion is deeply rooted in the mind of every MuVenda; he is firmly convinced that should he have sexual intercourse with such a woman he will die of consumption. So great is the fear of this disease that a man will not inherit his brother's wife if that brother has died of consumption, as he fears that such a union would bring a similar fate upon himself. In spite of this dread on the part of the menfolk abortion is by no means uncommon, often being brought about, with the help of a medicine-man, by women who have committed adultery and become pregnant by some man other than their husbands. A man suspecting such an occurrence will, unknown to his wife, consult a medicine-man. If his suspicions are confirmed he will demand the name of her seducer and make the offender pay the usual fine for adultery. After any abortion, before the man will again have sexual intercourse with his wife, he will take her to a medicine-man, where they undergo a purification ceremony together.

In his book, History of the Basuto about the Basotho, David Frédéric Ellenberger wrote:

Monaheng, had twin sons by his first wife before he left Tebang, which was a name given to the country north of the Vaal where his ancestor Motebang lived for some generations. Possibly Motebang took his name from that country. According to a barbarous custom then in vogue, one of these children should have been destroyed, so that the other might thrive the better; and the old men of the tribe wished to have it so in this case. But the infants were such fine healthy children and so alike that the parents refused to comply with ancient custom, and they were both allowed to live; but in order to pacify or to escape the notice of the evil spirits who might thereby have been offended, they were given names of contempt. The elder was called Mokheseng (" scorn him") and the younger Monyane (" one of no account ").

=== Post-colonial and Apartheid era ===
Abortion was first legalised in South Africa under the Abortion and Sterilization Act, 1975 (Act No.2 of 1975). This law stated that women could access pregnancy terminations if; continuing the pregnancy could be life-threatening or cause serious health issues, continuing the pregnancy could be of severe risk to the woman's mental health, the child is likely to be born with significant irreparable physical or mental defects, or, the foetus was conceived by means of rape or incest. This was later overridden on 1 February 1997, when the Choice on Termination of Pregnancy Act (Act 92 of 1996) came into force.

Before legalisation in 1975, abortion was prohibited throughout the country, however some white women, could request private doctors to perform a dilation and curettage, on the grounds that the continuation of pregnancy threatened the woman's mental wellbeing. This was generally not an option for women of colour, due to the Apartheid regime, meaning the choice by doctors to carry out this procedure was both a personal and professional risk. Black women and those of mixed heritage often had to rely on "backstreet" abortions or their own efforts to terminate pregnancies, often resulting in severe injuries and fatalities.

The Choice on Termination of Pregnancy Act which came into force in 1997 now allows all women to access abortions in their first trimester, and on the above-mentioned terms after week 13 of the pregnancy.

== The law ==
In South Africa, a woman of any age can get an abortion on request with no reasons given if she is less than 13 weeks pregnant. Minors will be advised to consult their parents, but it is up to the individual to decide whether or not to do so. Equally, a woman who is married or in a relationship with a longterm partner, will be advised to consult them, but again, that decision is for her to make. Exceptions to this, are if the woman is severely mentally ill or in a state of continuous unconsciousness, where consent of a spouse, parent or legal guardian is required.

The Constitution does not explicitly mention abortion, but two sections of the Bill of Rights mention reproductive rights. Section 12(2)(a) states that, "Everyone has the right to bodily and psychological integrity, which includes the right... to make decisions concerning reproduction," while section 27(1)(a) states "Everyone has the right to have access to... health care services, including reproductive health care." In the case of Christian Lawyers Association v Minister of Health, an anti-abortion organisation which challenged the validity of the Choice on Termination of Pregnancy Act on the basis that it violated the right to life in section 11 of the Bill of Rights, the Transvaal Provincial Division of the High Court dismissed this argument, ruling that constitutional rights only apply to those who are born, and not to foetuses.

Health workers are under no obligation to perform or take active part in an abortion if they do not wish to; however, they are obligated by law to assist if it is required to save the life of the patient, such as in an emergency situation. A health worker who is approached by a woman for an abortion may decline if they choose to do so, but are obligated by law to inform the woman of her rights and refer her to another health worker or facility where she can get the abortion. Most abortion centres will provide pre- and post-abortion counselling, something which women can legally demand, however it is not a legal requirement that abortion centres provide it without request.

Midwives with the correct training can provide abortion services throughout the first trimester, however beyond the 12th week of pregnancy, only doctors can carry this out. Despite this, nurses can administer medication and lead patient management throughout these procedures. In 2008 amendments were made to the legislation to ensure that nurses given the required training, could also perform such procedures.

== Inequalities and Implications of Abortion ==
Post-Apartheid South Africa remains separated by interlinking inequalities, which go beyond race to geography, culture, education, wealth and so on. Not only do these inequalities prevent women from accessing abortions, but they also prevent women from being educated about them.

=== Geographical inequalities ===
Whilst all women in South Africa are entitled to abortions, in reality geographical factors often act as implications in accessing them. Favier et al found that urban women had better knowledge of their rights and of how to find local services, as well as being in closer proximity to abortion services.

=== Racial inequalities ===
Historically, white women had better access to abortion services, either by means of private doctors as previously mentioned, or due to their finances which allowed them to travel to England and the Netherlands to undergo such procedures. With the passing of the 1975 law, black women were still unable to access safe abortion services, as they were not allowed to use White hospitals under Apartheid laws. A 1994 study showed that 90% of women admitted to hospital following incomplete abortions were black, and so were all those who died from illegal abortions. Both historically and currently, black women face the worst consequences of illegal, unsafe and legal abortions.

=== Financial inequalities ===
In South Africa, there is no singular healthcare system, but both a public and private system which work alongside one another. 80% of the population rely on the public system, yet only 20% of doctors work within it. This results in significant health inequalities as a result of wealth, with middle and upper-class citizens receiving excellent healthcare, and those relying on the public system experiencing inadequate resources, poor levels of privacy and significant overcrowding. Unfortunately this reflects the access to abortion services, where women who cannot access local abortion services due to a lack of staff willing to perform procedures, forcing them to rely on private services beyond their financial reach.

=== Cultural implications ===
Many women choose to undergo informal or "backstreet" abortions due to fears of facing social stigma by health workers. This is often the case for sex workers who may believe that the privacy and anonymity of such a procedure outweighs the potential health risks. This displays the attitudes of many people in South Africa, who describe women seeking abortions as sinful, unfit for marriage and even witches.

Within South Africa, a substantial 80% of the population rely on traditional medicine, with this figure rising to 90% in rural areas for both cultural and economic reasons. Steenkamp found that 18 plant species have been recorded to be used by traditional healers in South Africa to induce the termination of a pregnancy.

=== Age ===
Mchunu et al indicate that several studies have identified the predictors of unsafe sexual practices during the early adolescent years, such as individual, sociodemographic, familial, and relational characteristics, poverty, cultural and family patterns of early sexual experience and lack of school or career goals. This shows us how a combination of the above mentioned factors can result in increased premature sexual encounters and thus abortions, disproportionately affecting some more than others. Adolescent pregnancy reduces educational attainment amongst young women, resulting in poorer life prospects, and the likelihood of little abortion education, allowing the cycle to continue.

== Statistics ==
- Since the legalisation of elective abortion care, there has been a decrease in deaths from clandestine abortions (those provided outside of designated facilities), but the number of deaths following abortions are still quite high according to statistics gathered in Gauteng province, where 57% of abortion-related maternal deaths following childbirth, are a result of illegal abortions.
- A 2003 study in Soweto showed that the rate of abortions for women older than 20 years decreased from 15.2% in 1999 to 13.2% in 2001, the rate for women aged 16–20 decreased from 21% to 14.9%, and the rate for women aged 13–16 decreased from 28% to 23%. In 2001, 27% of abortions were second-trimester.
- Almost 20% of girls aged 10-19 experience adolescent pregnancy in South Africa. Two-thirds of these result in childbirth, whilst the remaining third turn to unsafe abortions.

== See also ==
- Abortion by country
- Abortion debate
- Abortion law
- Law of persons in South Africa
- Religion and abortion
- Choice on Termination of Pregnancy Act, 1996
- History of Abortion Law Debate
- Birth control in Africa
