= Christian Lawyers Association v Minister of Health =

South African legal case

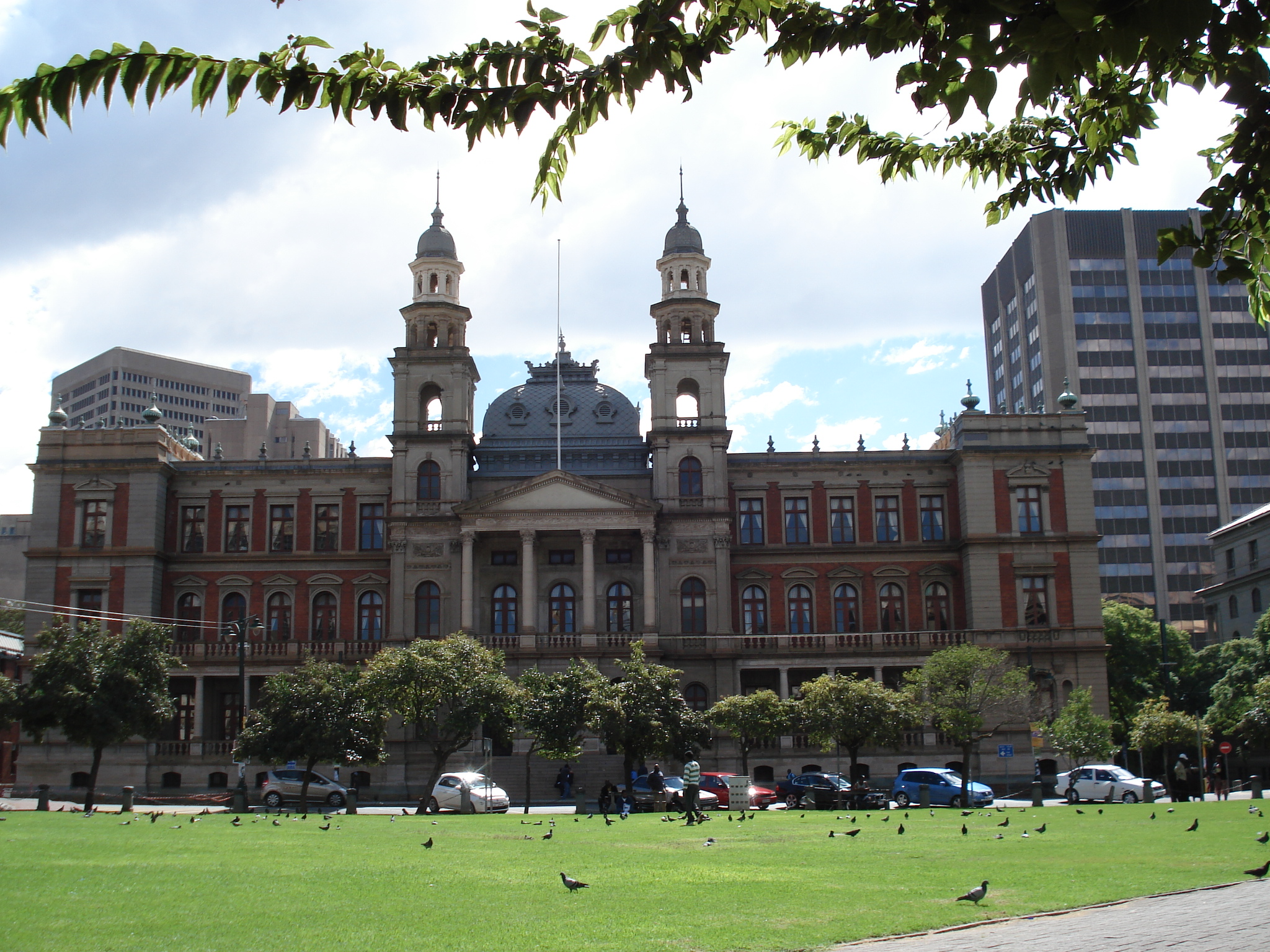
- Court: Transvaal Provincial Division
- Full case name: Christian Lawyers Association of SA and Others v Minister of Health and Others
- Decided: 10 July 1998
- Citations: 1998 (11) BCLR 1434 (T), 1998 (4) SA 1113 (T)

Court membership
- Judge sitting: McCreath J

Christian Lawyers Association v Minister of Health is a case in which the Transvaal Provincial Division of the High Court of South Africa ruled on the constitutionality of the Choice on Termination of Pregnancy Act, the law which governs abortion in South Africa. The Christian Lawyers Association claimed that abortion violates section 11 of the Constitution, which provides that "Everyone has the right to life."

The government noted an exception (a demurrer) on the grounds that constitutional rights do not apply to fetuses and that there was therefore no case to answer. The court accepted the government's argument and the case was dismissed.
