= Minister of Public Works v Kyalami Ridge Environmental Association =

South African legal case

- Court: Constitutional Court of South Africa
- Full case name: Minister of Public Works and Others v Kyalami Ridge Environmental Association and Others
- Decided: 29 May 2001
- Citations: [2001] ZACC 19, 2001 (3) SA 1151 (CC), 2001 (7) BCLR 652 (CC)

Court membership
- Judges sitting: Chaskalson P, Ackermann, Goldstone, Kriegler, Madala, Mokgoro, Ngcobo, Sachs & Yacoob JJ, Madlanga & Somyalo AJJ

Case opinions
- Decision by: Chaskalson

Minister of Public Works and Others v Kyalami Ridge Environmental Association and Others, an important case in South African law, was decided by the Constitutional Court on May 29, 2001.

== Facts ==
The South African government established a transit camp on state-owned land which had previously been used as a prison farm. The purpose of the camp was to house those people from the Alexandra Township who had been displaced by severe floods. The intention was that the persons so accommodated would move to permanent housing when such became available, and that the transit camp would then be dismantled. This plan was made without any prior discussions with residents in the area.

A residents' association called on the Minister of Public Works to suspend operations, contending that the establishment of the transit camp involved an alteration in the use of the land, and was being carried out in contravention of the Environment Conservation Act and the National Environmental Management Act When its call to cease operations went unsatisfied, the association launched an urgent application in the High Court for an interdict restraining the Minister and the contractor

1. from proceeding with the establishment of an informal settlement on the land in question; and
2. from proceeding with the construction and/or erection of temporary or permanent dwelling units for that purpose and permitting any persons to come onto the property for the purpose of settling there, temporarily or permanently, as residents.

The High Court granted an interim interdict in those terms. This was to remain in force pending the determination of an application in which the association sought an order setting aside the decision to establish the transit camp and directing the government to reconsider the decision after consulting the local residents and taking into account their representations, and after giving due consideration to the environmental impact of establishing a transit camp there. After hearing argument on the application, the High Court made an order substantially in those terms.

== High Court ==
The residents contended that there was no legislation authorising the government to take the action it had, and that, accordingly, the government's decision to establish the camp was unlawful. The decision was unlawful also in that it contravened a town-planning scheme and land and environmental legislation, and had been taken without affording a hearing to local residents.

The government, in turn, argued that it had a constitutional obligation to assist the flood victims, and that, as owner of the land, it was entitled to make the land available for such purpose. The only decision that had been taken was to consent to the transit camp being erected on state property. This was not an administrative decision; it was a decision taken by the state as owner of the land. It did not require legislative authorisation. The government disputed that it had breached the township or environmental legislation, and also disputed the claim that it was obliged to afford the residents a hearing before taking the decision.

The court a quo found that the scheme was not one for temporary shelter, but rather "a development for an indefinite period which on the probabilities would be utilized on a permanent ongoing basis, either by the proposed occupants or by the government." It set aside the decision, finding that it could not be validly implemented without complying with the various statutes, laws, by-laws and regulations, and ordered the relevant department to reconsider the decision

- after proper consultation with the local residents;
- after having heard representations; and
- after having given due consideration to the environmental impact of the establishment of such a settlement.

== Constitutional Court ==
The government applied successfully for leave to appeal directly to the Constitutional Court against the order made by the court a quo. In a unanimous judgment, written by Chaskalson P, the court upheld the appeal and substituted for the order of the court a quo an order dismissing the application.

The Constitutional Court first addressed the question of whether the government had the power to establish a transit camp on the prison farm for the accommodation of flood victims. The Constitution makes provision for a separation of powers between the legislature, the executive and the judiciary. This separation ordinarily implies that the legislature makes the laws, the executive implements them and the judiciary determines whether, in the light of the Constitution and the law, conduct is lawful or unlawful. Although the separation prescribed by the Constitution is not absolute, and on occasions some overlapping of functions is permissible, action that is inconsistent with the separation demanded is invalid.

The Constitution requires the state to take "reasonable legislative and other measures, within its available resources, to achieve the progressive realisation" of the right of everyone to have access to housing. In this context, "the state" includes the various legislative and executive organs in all spheres of government. In discharging their obligations, these organs must act consistently with the Constitution and the separation of powers mandated by it. It has been held that the national sphere of government must assume responsibility for ensuring that laws, policies, programs and strategies are adequate to meet the state's obligations in this regard. This, the court found, includes the need to facilitate access to temporary relief for people who have no access to land and no roof over their heads, for people who are living in intolerable conditions, and for people who are in crisis because of natural disasters such as floods and fires, or because their homes are under threat of demolition.

The government contended that these obligations required it to come to the assistance of the flood victims and that, in doing so, it could not be said to be acting contrary to the rule of law; furthermore, as owner of the land in question, the government enjoyed all the rights that a private owner would have, including the right to erect buildings on its property, so that a decision to assert such a right to give effect to its constitutional obligations was therefore a lawful decision.

The court held that there was no reason why the government, as owner of property, should not have the same rights as any other owner. If it asserted those rights within the framework of the Constitution and the restrictions of any relevant legislation, it acted lawfully. Where legislation prescribed the manner in which particular functions were to be performed by government, it might be implicit in that legislation that such functions could only be performed in terms of the legislation. In that event the legislation would override any powers that the government might have as owner of property.

The residents had relied on various pieces of legislation in contending that there was a legislative framework empowering the government to deal with the consequences of natural disasters and that the government should have acted within the parameters of that framework. The court pointed out that none of those enactments was either designed for or appropriate to the provision of relief to flood victims. It could not be said that those laws excluded or limited the government's common-law power to make its land available to flood victims pursuant to its constitutional duty to provide them with access to housing. If regard were had to its constitutional obligations, to its rights as owner of the land, and to its executive power to implement policy decisions, its decision to establish a temporary transit camp for the flood victims was lawful. The contentions to the contrary advanced by the residents had therefore to be rejected.
