= Choice on Termination of Pregnancy Act, 1996 =

Law governing abortion in South Africa

Parliament of South Africa
- Long title: Act to determine the circumstances in which and conditions under which the pregnancy of a woman may be terminated; and to provide for matters connected therewith.
- Citation: Act No. 92 of 1996
- Enacted by: Parliament of South Africa
- Assented to: 12 November 1996
- Commenced: 1 February 1997

Amended by
- Choice on Termination of Pregnancy Amendment Act, 2008 (Act No. 1 of 2008)

Keywords
- abortion, reproductive rights
- Status: In force

The Choice on Termination of Pregnancy Act, 1996 (Act No. 92 of 1996) is the law governing abortion in South Africa. It allows abortion on demand up to the twelfth week of pregnancy, under broadly specified circumstances from the thirteenth to the twentieth week, and only for serious medical reasons after the twentieth week. The Act has been described by the Guttmacher Institute as "one of the most liberal abortion laws in the world".

== History ==
Before the enactment of the Choice on Termination of Pregnancy Act, abortion was governed by the Abortion and Sterilization Act, 1975, which only allowed abortions when the woman's mental or physical health was seriously threatened, there was a likelihood that the child would be born with a severe handicap, or the pregnancy was the result of rape or incest. It required the approval of two doctors independent of the one performing the abortion, and in some cases also of a psychiatrist or a magistrate.

The Choice on Termination of Pregnancy Act was introduced in the first post-Apartheid parliament. It implemented the statement in the governing African National Congress' policy framework that "every woman must have the right to choose whether or not to have an early termination of pregnancy according to her own beliefs". Although it was requested that parliament members be allowed to vote according to their personal beliefs, the ruling party ruled that its own members may not vote against the act, and the Act passed by 209 votes to 87 (5 abstained, 99 were absent). It came into force on 1 February 1997.

== Provisions ==
During the first twelve weeks of a pregnancy, an abortion may be performed at the request of the woman. From the thirteenth to the twentieth week, a pregnancy may be terminated if it endangers the woman's mental or physical health, if the foetus may suffer from a severe mental or physical abnormality, if the pregnancy resulted from rape or incest, or if it would significantly affect the woman's social or economic circumstances. After the twentieth week, a pregnancy may only be terminated if it could endanger the woman's life, if the foetus is severely malformed, or if there is a risk of severe injury to the foetus.

An abortion in the first twelve weeks may be performed by a medical practitioner or by an appropriately trained nurse or midwife; after twelve weeks it may only be performed by a doctor.

Abortions may only be performed at facilities which meet certain requirements for staffing and equipment, and which have been approved by the provincial Member of the Executive Council (MEC) responsible for health. Facilities with a 24-hour maternity service and which meet the other requirements do not require the MEC's approval to perform abortions in the first twelve weeks of pregnancy.

An abortion can only be performed with the informed consent of the woman, and no other person's consent may be required. Even in the case where a minor is pregnant, she must be advised to discuss it with her parents, guardian or family, but their consent is not required. When a pregnant woman is seriously mentally ill or in a coma, her pregnancy may be terminated with the consent of her spouse or guardian, or on the authority of two doctors without the consent of the spouse or guardian if there is a serious medical risk.

It is a crime for anyone to perform an abortion without being qualified to do so, or in an unapproved facility; it is also a crime for anyone to prevent a legal abortion or obstruct access to an abortion facility. The penalty is a fine or imprisonment for up to ten years.

The Act repeals the Abortion and Sterilization Act to the extent that it deals with abortion, and also repeals any laws on abortion in force in the former homelands.

== Constitutional challenges ==
The Christian Lawyers Association and other anti-abortion groups challenged the constitutionality of the Act, asserting that it violated the right to life contained in section 11 of the Bill of Rights. In 1998 the Transvaal Provincial Division of the High Court dismissed the case, ruling that a foetus is not a person and does not have a right to life, and that the right to make decisions concerning reproduction, contained in section 12 of the Bill of Rights, protects a woman's right to abortion.

In 2004 the Christian Lawyers Association brought a second constitutional challenge, this time against the provisions of the Act that allow a girl under the age of 18 to have an abortion without the consent of her parents or guardian. The court also dismissed this case, noting that the common-law rules relating to informed consent mean that a girl who cannot understand the consequences of an abortion is not able to legally consent to one without the assistance of her parents.

== Amendment ==
An amending Act, the Choice on Termination of Pregnancy Amendment Act, 2004 (Act No. 38 of 2004), which came into force on 11 February 2005, amended the Choice on Termination of Pregnancy Act, 1996. The Choice on Termination of Pregnancy Act, 1996 (as amended by Act 38 of 2004), expanded access to abortions, allowed registered nurses, as well as registered midwives, to perform abortions up to the twelfth week of pregnancy. It delegated to the provincial MECs the power to approve and disapprove abortion facilities and the power to make regulations under the Act, powers which had previously belonged to the national Minister of Health. It also introduced the provision exempting facilities with a 24-hour maternity service from needing the MEC's approval to perform abortions in the first twelve weeks.

On 17 August 2006, the Constitutional Court ruled that the Choice on Termination of Pregnancy Amendment Act, 2004 (Act No. 38 of 2004) was invalid, in the case of Doctors for Life International v Speaker of the National Assembly and Others. It was invalidated not because of its content, but because Parliament had not allowed for the public participation required by the Constitution; however, the court suspended its order for eighteen months to allow Parliament to remedy the situation. Parliament re-enacted the amendments under a further amending Act, the Choice on Termination of Pregnancy Amendment Act, 2008 (Act No. 1 of 2008), with the required public participation, and this amending Act 1 of 2008 came into force on 18 February 2008.

A later amending Act, the Criminal Law (Sexual Offences and Related Matters) Amendment Act, 2007 (Act No. 32 of 2007), further amended the Choice on Termination of Pregnancy Act, 1996 by updating the definitions of "rape" and "incest" making these statutory instead of common law crimes.

A further amending Act, the Choice on Termination of Pregnancy Amendment Act, 2008 (Act No. 1 of 2008), also amended the Choice on Termination of Pregnancy Act, 1996 with effect from 18 February 2008. These amendments further amended definitions, devolved power in relation to making of regulations, relaxed registration requirements for some facilities, provided for records, and related matters.
