= Shabalala v Attorney-General, Transvaal =

South African legal case

Shabalala & Others v Attorney-General of Transvaal and Another is an important case in South African criminal procedure, in which the applicants had been indicted to stand trial in a Provincial Division on a charge of murder.

Before the trial, various applications were made to the trial Court on behalf of the applicants, including an application that they be given copies of the relevant police dockets.

The court refused the applications, holding that the applicants had not satisfied the court that the documents were "required" by them within the meaning of section 23 of the Constitution "for the exercise of any of their rights to a fair trial".

It was held that what a fair trial might require depends on the circumstances of each particular case and it is for the trial court to exercise a proper discretion in this regard.

The court held that an accused is ordinarily entitled to have access to documents in the police docket which are exculpatory (or which are prima facie, likely to be helpful to the defence) unless, in very rare cases, the State was able to justify the refusal of such access on the grounds that it was not justified for the purposes of a fair trial.

Ordinarily the right to a fair trial would include access to the statements of witnesses (whether or not the State intended calling such witnesses) and such of the contents of a police docket as were relevant in order to enable an accused person properly to exercise that right, but the prosecution might, in a particular case, be able to justify the denial of such access on the grounds that it was not justified for the purposes of a fair trial. This would depend on the circumstances of each case.

The court noted that the State is entitled to resist a claim by the accused for access to any particular document in the police docket on the grounds that such access was not justified for the purposes of enabling the accused properly to exercise his or her right to a fair trial, or on the ground that it had reason to believe that there was a reasonable risk that access to the relevant document would lead to the disclosure of the identity of an informer or State secrets, or on the grounds that there was a reasonable risk that such disclosure might lead to the intimidation of witnesses or otherwise prejudice the proper ends of justice. In this regard, the court has a discretion.

Furthermore, the accused is only entitled to access to the docket when the investigation is completed and he has been formally charged. This fixes the problem of the accused possibly thwarting the investigation.

Regarding whether or not the accused is entitled to interview a State witness, the court held that there is no general right. The witness must consent to this; one may not compel the witness. The State may also insist on being present.

Furthermore, the State may refuse to allow the accused to interview a State witness and the accused can either accept this or apply to the court to decide the issue.

== Notes ==
- Shabalala and Others vs Attorney-General of Transvaal & another 1996 (1) SA 725 (Constitutional Court of South Africa). http://www.justice.gov.za/sca/judgments/sca_2010/sca10-008.pdf
