= Pendente lite =

Legal term

Pendente lite is a Latin term meaning "awaiting the litigation" or "pending the litigation" which applies to court orders which are in effect while a matter (such as a sale of goods or a divorce) is pending. In divorce cases, a pendente lite order is often used to provide for the support of the lower income spouse while the legal process moves ahead.

Pendente lite should not be confused with lis pendens. Lis pendens also means "a pending lawsuit", but lis pendens is a document filed in the public records of the county where particular real property is located stating that a pending lawsuit may affect the title to the property. Because nobody wants to buy real estate if its ownership is in dispute, a lis pendens notice effectively ties up the property until the case is resolved. Lis pendens notices are often filed in divorce actions when there is disagreement about selling or dividing the family home.

== See also ==
- Interlocutory appeal
