= Monica Leeuw =

South African judge

The Honourable Monica Leeuw

Judge President of the North West High Court
- In office 2010–2022
- President: Jacob Zuma
- Preceded by: Mogoeng Mogoeng
- Succeeded by: Ronald Hendricks

Judge of the High Court
- In office 1999–2022
- President: Thabo Mbeki
- Division: North West

Personal details
- Born: Mashangu Monica Mhangwane; 29 July 1952 (age 74) Lady Selborne, Pretoria; Transvaal, Union of South Africa
- Education: University of the North; University of Bophuthatswana

Mashangu Monica Leeuw (née Mhangwane; born 29 July 1952) is a retired South African judge who was Judge President of the North West High Court from 2010 to 2022. She was the first woman to serve as a judge president in the High Court of South Africa.

Formerly a prosecutor in Bophuthatswana and later an advocate in the North West, Leeuw was appointed to the bench in 1999 and retired in 2022. She was an acting judge in the Constitutional Court in 2014.

== Early life and career ==
Leeuw was born on 29 July 1952 in Lady Selborne, a settlement in Pretoria in the former Transvaal. She matriculated in 1970 at Hwiti High School in Pietersburg and completed her BProc at the University of the North in 1976. Later, a decade into her legal career in 1987, she completed an LLB at the University of Bophuthatswana.

== Legal career ==
Leeuw began her legal career as a legal assistant at the Ga-Rankuwa Magistrate's Court until, in 1978, she began work as a public prosecutor at the Mmabatho Magistrate's Court in Bophuthatswana, a nominally independent bantustan. She rose through the ranks to become regional control prosecutor for western Bophuthatswana in 1981, and in 1987 she was appointed as state advocate in the Bophuthatswana High Court.

She served her pupillage in Pretoria in 1990 and became the first black woman to join the Pretoria Bar. She practiced as an advocate in the North West Bar from 1991 until 1997, when she took up a post as a law lecturer at the University of Bophuthatswana. During the same period, she served as an investigator in the Skweyiya Commission, headed by Thembile Skweyiya, which investigated allegations of corruption in the (by then defunct) Bophuthatswana government.

== North West High Court: 1999–2022 ==
In 1999, Leeuw was appointed as a judge in the North West High Court (then still named after Bophuthatswana). During her time on the bench, she was acting Judge President of the North West High Court in 2005, and she also acted as a judge at the Labour Court and Labour Appeal Court in 2007. In November 2007, President Thabo Mbeki appointed her permanently as a judge of the Labour Appeal Court.

=== Judge President: 2010–2022 ===
In May 2010, Mbeki's successor, President Jacob Zuma, appointed Leeuw as Judge President of the North West High Court. She was the first woman to be appointed as Judge President in any division of the High Court of South Africa. She served until her retirement at the end of August 2022.

During her tenure as Judge President, Leeuw was seconded as an acting judge to the Constitutional Court, where she filled retired Justice Thembile Skweyiya's seat between 1 August and 31 December 2014. She was seconded alongside two other acting women judges, in what was viewed as part of an effort to widen the pool of women candidates for permanent appointment to the Constitutional Court. She wrote the court's unanimous judgement in Stratford and Others v Investec Bank Limited and Others, handed down in December 2014. Leeuw also chaired the Independent Commission for the Remuneration of Public Office Bearers, a panel established by President Cyril Ramaphosa to make recommendations for salaries and benefits in senior political and judicial offices.

== Personal life ==
She is married to Sello Andrew, a pharmacist; they have three children.
