= John Didcott =

South African judge (1931–1998)

Justice of the Constitutional Court
- In office 14 February 1995 – 20 October 1998
- Appointed by: Nelson Mandela
- Preceded by: Court established
- Succeeded by: Sandile Ngcobo

Judge of the Supreme Court
- In office 16 June 1975 – 12 October 1994
- Division: Natal Provincial Division

Personal details
- Born: John Mowbray Didcott; 14 August 1931 Durban, Natal; Union of South Africa
- Died: 20 October 1998 (aged 67) Durban, South Africa
- Spouse: Pam Didcott
- Education: University of Cape Town; Hilton College

John Mowbray Didcott (14 August 1931 – 20 October 1998) was a South African judge who served in the Constitutional Court of South Africa from February 1995 until his death in October 1998. He joined the bench in 1975 as a judge of the Natal Provincial Division, where he was known for defending human rights during the apartheid era.

Born in Durban, Didcott became active in anti-apartheid politics at the University of Cape Town, where he was president of the National Union of South African Students. He entered legal practice in 1956 as an advocate, leading a successful commercial law practice in Durban and taking silk in 1967. He was also chairperson of the Natal Bar from 1973 to 1975.

Between June 1975 and October 1994, Didcott served as a judge of the Natal Division of the Supreme Court of South Africa, where he was particularly reputed for his progressive judgments in public and administrative law. Eschewing textualist interpretation of apartheid legislation, he handed down various judgments in favour of individual rights and the political freedoms of the anti-apartheid movement. He was a vocal opponent of capital punishment and famously never handed down a death sentence.

After the first post-apartheid elections of 1994, and on the advice of the Judicial Service Commission, newly elected President Nelson Mandela appointed Didcott to the inaugural bench of the Constitutional Court of South Africa. He served there for less than four years before his death from leukaemia in 1998.

== Early life and education ==
Didcott was born on 14 August 1931 in Durban in what was then the Natal Province. His father, John Leonard Didcott, a medical doctor and Rhodes Scholar, died in 1942 during his childhood. He matriculated at Hilton College in 1948 and attended the University of Cape Town, where he completed a Bachelor of Arts in 1951 and a Bachelor of Laws in 1953. During his last year as a student, he received the Abe Bailey Trust's Travel Bursary for travel to the United Kingdom.

As a student during the early apartheid period, Didcott was active in progressive student politics: elected to the student representative council in his first year in Cape Town, he served as its president from 1952 to 1954, and he was president of the National Union of South African Students from 1953 to 1954. Chief Justice Ismail Mahomed, who was a student during the same period, described him as a charismatic politician, and he was known as a skilled public speaker; his debates against Zach de Beer and Sharkey King frequently packed the university's Jameson Hall. In 1953, he was a founding member of the Liberal Party of South Africa.

He was admitted to the Bar in Cape Town on 26 February 1954, but did not enter practice; instead, he spent a year as a legal reporter for the Cape Argus, covering the Supreme Court of South Africa. He left that position in 1955 to join a delegation of the International Student Conference on a tour of universities in southeast Asia.

== Legal practice ==
In July 1956, Didcott returned to his hometown to establish chambers at the Durban Bar. He practised there for the next two decades, with the exception of several months in 1960, when, during the state of emergency that followed the Sharpeville massacre, he fled briefly to Southern Rhodesia to avoid the attention of the security police.

He had a successful commercial law practice in Durban, and he took silk on 19 July 1967. From 1973 to 1975, he was the chairperson of the Natal Bar, and he was twice as an acting judge of the Supreme Court's Natal Provincial Division: first in February 1971 and then from April to June 1975.

== Natal Supreme Court: 1975–1994 ==
On 16 June 1975, at the comparatively young age of 43, Didcott joined the Natal bench permanently as a judge of the Supreme Court. Unlike some other opponents of apartheid, he was not averse to serving in its judiciary. In 1983, when legal scholar Raymond Wacks encouraged all "moral judges" to resign in protest, Didcott articulated his view on this subject in the Sunday Tribune, writing that:

It might be a fine protest, but it would soon dissipate, and the vacancies would be filled by people who had no qualms about injustice. If we argue that moral judges should resign, we can no longer pray when we go into court that we find a moral judge on the bench.

During his 19 years in the Supreme Court, Didcott was reputed as "temperamental and irascible", or, by his admirers, as "intolerant of mediocrity". Among the counsel who appeared before him in Natal, Chris Nicholson described him as "like a chess Grand Master, simultaneously playing a number of matches with counsel", and Pius Langa recalled that, "some loved him intensely. Others feared him. They did not want to appear before him because he was capable of ripping them apart; such was his sharpness."

=== Jurisprudence ===
In his celebrated work on the judicial process, Ronald Dworkin illustrated the implications of legal theory by the use of a model judge, Hercules J Hercules, who is able to take legal precedent seriously, while developing the law in harmony with its proclaimed values and commitments, no matter how complex the case. In real life such a task is almost unattainable in every situation. But if ever South Africa had a Judge Hercules on the Bench during the past 20 years, including the worst of the apartheid era, it was John Didcott. His commitment to principle, intellect, integrity and courage over a sustained period of judicial office represented a beacon of hope when many questioned the role of law in the country.

— Judge Dennis Davis on Didcott's jurisprudence

==== Apartheid ====
Didcott wrote several significant judgments in civil cases, including Roffey v Catterall, on the onus of proof in restraint of trade disputes. However, he was best known for his judgments in public law and human rights law, particularly those involving apartheid legislation and the treatment of anti-apartheid activists. Among other things, he overturned a banning order against activist Fatima Meer, and in 1986 he handed down judgment in the earliest legal challenge to the nationwide state of emergency instituted by the government in the aftermath of the Vaal uprising. In the later case, brought by the Metal and Allied Workers' Union, he upheld various emergency regulations but struck down several limitations on subversive speech and ruled that persons arrested under the state of emergency must be given access to a lawyer. The following year, Didcott overturned a government ban on foreign donations to the United Democratic Front, then the country's foremost anti-apartheid organisation.

Didcott was also openly critical of the government of President P. W. Botha and his predecessors, especially on the grounds that they usurped judicial powers and undermined the rule of law; observers believed that these statements ruled him out of contention for elevation to the Supreme Court's Appellate Division.

==== Individual rights ====
Alongside a small number of other judges, such as John Milne and Michael Corbett, Didcott was regarded as maintaining "the minority position of ameliorist sensitivity to liberty wherever possible", despite the apartheid context. One of his most notable judgments was S v Khanyile on the right of accused persons to legal representation; he held that, if a trial without representation would be grossly unfair, a presiding judge should go so far as to order that the accused receive legal aid. Khanyile was overturned by the Appellate Division in S v Rudman; S v Mthwana.

Didcott was also a well-known opponent of capital punishment; he was an overt supporter of the Society for the Abolition of the Death Penalty. Although prevailing legislation imposed the death penalty as a mandatory sentence in a broad range of circumstances, he – unusually among apartheid judges – never sentenced to a defendant to death, always ascertaining extenuating circumstances that justified a lighter penalty. His friend Jack Greenberg later recalled that, "When I asked him how he could maintain that record, he said he always found a reason. I said, 'What if you weren't able to find a reason?' and he said, 'Then I'd resign.'''

From August to December 1984, Didcott was a visiting scholar at the Columbia Law School in New York, and that trip to the United States cemented his support for the development of a South African bill of rights akin to the American one. In subsequent years, he advocated publicly for a bill of rights to be devised, though he also warned that a bill of rights should not "protect private property with such zeal that it entrenches privilege", nor "make the urgent task of social or economic reform impossible or difficult to undertake".

==== Statutory interpretation ====
Our courts are constitutionally powerless to legislate or to veto legislation. They can only interpret it and then implement it in accordance with their interpretation of it. When there is a real doubt about the meaning of a statute, their tradition is to construe it so that it provides for the least amount of interference with the liberty of the individual that is compatible with the language used. The tradition has been observed for so long and has permeated so many fields of law, that it is unnecessary to cite authority for its acceptance. It is familiar to all lawyers. Its justification is the judicial assumption, deeply rooted in our legal heritage, that Parliament contemplated no greater infringement of personal freedom than is clearly and unmistakably apparent from the language in which it has expressed itself.

— Didcott J in Nxasana v Minister of Justice, on the interpretation of the Terrorism Act

Because of his "innovative" interpretation of apartheid legislation, Didcott was sometimes subject to the criticism – as paraphrased by David Dyzenhaus – that he "was in dereliction of his duty because in order to establish his unblemished record, he had to lie about the law", trenching on parliamentary sovereignty. However, George Bizos characterized this as Didcott's admirable resistance to "sterile legalism" in statutory interpretation; both Bizos and Etienne Mureinik viewed him as a leading exponent of a rights-based, non-textualist form of statutory interpretation. In 1994, Didcott explained that, although he accepted the judicial obligation to consider legislative intent, he also held that legislative intent, in the context of statute, "is simply legal shorthand for a more sophisticated concept... what the law calls the rules of our Common Law particularly with regard to natural justice".

In the 1979 matter of In re Dube, Didcott overturned an application of the Black (Urban Areas) Consolidation Act, famously explaining that:

It may have been in accordance with the legislation and, because what appears in legislation is the law, in accordance with that too. But it can hardly be said to have been 'In accordance with justice'. Parliament has the power to pass the statutes it likes, and there is nothing the Courts can do about that. The result is law. But that is not always the same as justice. The only way that Parliament can ever make legislation just is by making just legislation.

The In re Dube judgment was admired both by Justice Richard Goldstone and by Chief Justice Arthur Chaskalson; indeed, Goldstone later said that Didcott was his judicial "role model".

=== Post-apartheid transition ===
Following the negotiations to end apartheid, Didcott was a member of the Special Electoral Court that handled disputes arising during South Africa's first post-apartheid elections on 26 April 1994. Later the same year, he was a popular candidate for appointment to the new Constitutional Court of South Africa, which would be established under the Interim Constitution. Controversially, newly elected President Nelson Mandela declined to appoint him directly to the new court, but he was shortlisted and interviewed by the Judicial Service Commission in October 1994. Thereafter, on the recommendation of the Judicial Service Commission, he was one of six additional judges appointed by Mandela, and he left the Supreme Court on 12 October 1994.

== Constitutional Court: 1995–1998 ==
On 14 February 1995, Didcott was sworn in as a judge of the Constitutional Court, alongside the rest of the court's inaugural bench. During his brief tenure in the apex court, he wrote a large number of minority judgments, concurring with very few opinions written by other justices. He was also known for writing brief judgments: the Mail & Guardian reported complaints of the court that, "They can never get it right. You either get a two-page fiat from Judge Didcott or a 100-page treatise from Judge Ackermann".

Didcott wrote seven majority judgments on behalf of the Constitutional Court: S v Ntuli, Luitingh v Minister of Defence, Case v Minister of Safety and Security, Ynuico v Minister of Trade and Industry, Mohlomi v Minister of Defence, JT Publishing v Minister of Safety and Security, and S v Vermaas; S v Du Plessis. Notably, S v Vermaas restored the accused's right to legal representation, effectively redeeming Didcott's 1988 Supreme Court judgment in Khanyile. Similarly, in a concurring judgment in S v Makwanyane, Didcott affirmed his lifelong opposition to the death penalty, which that case outlawed. He wrote:

South Africa has experienced too such savagery. The wanton killing must stop before it makes a mockery of the civilised, humane and compassionate society to which the nation aspires, and has constitutionally pledged itself. And the state must set the example by demonstrating the priceless value it places on the lives of all its subjects – even the worst.

== Death and personal life ==
Seriously ill with leukaemia, Didcott was absent from court for most of 1998, and he died on 20 October 1998 at his home in Durban. His seat in the Constitutional Court was filled by Judge Sandile Ngcobo, who went on to become Chief Justice of South Africa.

He was married to Pam Didcott (née Brokensha) and had two daughters.

== Awards and honours ==
Didcott was made a Doctor of Law honoris causa by the University of Natal in April 1991, by the University of Cape Town in June 1991, and by the University of the Witwatersrand in April 1992. He was chancellor of the University of Durban–Westville from 1988 to 1993 and an honorary professor of procedural and clinical law at the University of Natal from 1989.

== Selected publications ==
- Didcott, John M. (1989). Installation address delivered on Friday, 12 May 1989. University of Durban-Westville. ISBN 978-0-947445-03-4.
- Didcott, John M. (1988). Salvaging the Law. Johannesburg: Centre for Applied Legal Studies, University of the Witwatersrand. ISBN 978-1-86814-095-4.
- O'Dowd, Michael C. (1954). John M. Didcott (ed.). The African in the Universities (2nd ed.). National Union of South African Students.
