= S v Vermaas =

South African legal case

In S v Vermaas; S v Du Plessis, the accused were charged with multiple counts of fraud. The main contention in this case was regarding the adjudication and referral of constitutional matters by the Transvaal Provincial Division, but the court also very briefly discussed the right to legal representation.

The court held that, where a legal representative is appointed for an accused at the expense of the State in terms of section 25(3)(e) of the Constitution, no right in the accused to pick the lawyer appointed for him can be derived from that subsection.
