= Malcolm Wallis =

The Honourable Malcolm Wallis

Judge of the Supreme Court of Appeal
- In office 1 June 2011 – 2021
- Appointed by: Jacob Zuma

Judge of the High Court of South Africa
- In office 1 January 2009 – 31 May 2011
- Appointed by: Kgalema Motlanthe
- Division: KwaZulu-Natal

Personal details
- Born: Malcolm John David Wallis; 8 July 1950 (age 76)
- Education: University of Natal (BCom, LLB); University of KwaZulu-Natal (PhD)

Malcolm John David Wallis (born 8 July 1950) is a South African retired judge who served in the Supreme Court of Appeal between 2011 and 2021. Formerly an advocate in Natal, he joined the bench in 2009 as a judge in the KwaZulu-Natal High Court.

== Education and early career ==
Born on 8 July 1950 in Durban, Wallis matriculated at Durban High School. He graduated from the University of Natal in 1972 with a BCom and LLB, and he entered practice as an advocate in Natal in 1973. He earned silk in December 1985. He was also chairperson of the Natal Bar between 1991 and 1993 and chairperson of the General Council of the Bar between 1994 and 1997.

In 2010, Wallis completed a doctorate at the University of KwaZulu-Natal. His dissertation in maritime law was published as The Associated Ship and South African Admiralty Jurisdiction.

== Judicial career ==
After several stints as an acting judge, Wallis joined the bench of the KwaZulu-Natal High Court on 1 January 2009. In addition, he was a judge in the Labour Appeal Court between 2010 and 2011.

In 2011, President Jacob Zuma elevated Wallis to the Supreme Court of Appeal, where he took office on 1 June. During his 10 years' service in the appellate court, his notable judgments included Minister of Justice and Constitutional Development v Southern African Litigation Centre, in which the court found that the South African government had acted unlawfully when it failed to effect an International Criminal Court arrest warrant against Omar al-Bashir.

Wallis was an acting judge of the Constitutional Court for one term between July and September 2015. During that time he wrote the highest court's unanimous judgment in Kham v Electoral Commission, an election law judgment that invalidated by-elections held in the Tlokwe Local Municipality in 2013.

In 2017, the Judicial Service Commission shortlisted him as a candidate to join the Constitutional Court bench permanently. After an interview in Midrand in April, the commission recommended Wallis and three others – Leona Theron, Steven Majiedt, and Jody Kollapen – as suitable for appointment. President Zuma appointed Theron.

He retired from the judiciary in 2021.

== Personal life ==
He married his wife, Janet, in 1977; they have three children.
