= S v Makwanyane =

South African legal case

- Court: Constitutional Court of South Africa
- Full case name: State v Makwanyane and Another
- Decided: 6 June 1995
- Citations: [1995] ZACC 3, 1995 (3) SA 391 (CC), 1995 (6) BCLR 665 (CC), [1996] 2 CHRLD 164, 1995 (2) SACR 1 (CC)

Case history
- Prior action: Referral from Appellate Division [1994] ZASCA 76

Court membership
- Judges sitting: Chaskalson P, Ackermann, Didcott, Kriegler, Langa, Madala, Mahomed, Mokgoro, O'Regan & Sachs JJ, Kentridge AJ

Case opinions
- The death penalty is inconsistent with the Interim Constitution; the provisions of the Criminal Procedure Act, or any other law, sanctioning capital punishment are invalid.
- Decision by: Chaskalson (all judges wrote concurring opinions)

Keywords
- capital punishment, human rights, constitutional law

S v Makwanyane and Another (CCT 3/94) was a landmark 1995 judgment of the Constitutional Court of South Africa. It established that capital punishment was inconsistent with the commitment to human rights expressed in the Interim Constitution. The court's ruling invalidated section 277(1)(a) of the Criminal Procedure Act 51 of 1977, which had provided for use of the death penalty, along with any similar provisions in any other law in force in South Africa. The court also forbade the government from carrying out the death sentence on any prisoners awaiting execution, ruling that they should remain in prison until new sentences were imposed. Delivered on 6 June, this was the newly established court's "first politically important and publicly controversial holding."

== Chance ==
The Court held that, in practice, there was an element of chance at every stage of the process of implementing the death penalty:

The outcome may be dependent upon factors such as the way the case is investigated by the police, the way the case is presented by the prosecutor, how effectively the accused is defended, the personality and particular attitude to capital punishment of the trial judge and, if the matter goes on appeal, the particular judges who are selected to hear the case. Race and poverty are also alleged to be factors.

== Human rights ==
The Court held further that the rights to life and dignity were the most important of all human rights and the source of all the other personal rights detailed in Chapter 3 of the Interim Constitution. Having committed to a society premised on the recognition and realisation of human rights, the State was required to value these two rights above all others, and to demonstrate that valuation in everything it did, including the punishment of criminals. This would not be achieved by depersonalising and executing murderers, even as a deterrent to others. Quite apart from the fact that vengeance or payback had not the same constitutional heft as the right to life and the right to dignity, the court was not satisfied that it had been shown that capital punishment would be more effective as a deterrent than a life sentence. Chaskalson P, writing for the majority, concluded that

the death sentence destroys life, which is protected without reservation under section 9 of our Constitution, it annihilates human dignity which is protected under section 10, elements of arbitrariness are present in its enforcement and it is irremediable [...]. I am satisfied that in the context of our Constitution the death penalty is indeed a cruel, inhuman and degrading punishment. "

The court also affirmed its commitment to the principle of constitutionalism, and more specifically constitutional values such as freedom, dignity and equality, by rejecting the "arbitrary and capricious" nature of the death penalty. Ackermann J made this much clear in his judgment:

We have moved from a past characterised by much which was arbitrary and unequal in the operation of the law to a present and a future in a constitutional state where state action must be such that it is capable of being analysed and justified rationally. The idea of the constitutional state presupposes a system whose operation can be rationally tested against or in terms of the law. Arbitrariness, by its very nature, is dissonant with these core concepts of our new constitutional order. Neither arbitrary action nor laws or rules which are inherently arbitrary or must lead to arbitrary application can, in any real sense, be tested against the precepts or principles of the Constitution.

He went on to cite Prof. Etienne Mureinik in this regard: "If the new Constitution is a bridge away from a culture of authority, it is clear what it must be a bridge to. It must lead to a culture of justification—a culture in which every exercise of power is expected to be justified [....] If the Constitution is to be a bridge in this direction, it is plain that the Bill of Rights must be its chief strut."

== Public opinion ==
Although it was widely believed that a majority of the population favoured retention of the death penalty, the court affirmed its commitment to its duties as an independent arbiter of the Constitution. It would not act merely as a vector for public opinion:

The question before us, however, is not what the majority of South Africans believe a proper sentence for murder should be. It is whether the Constitution allows the sentence.

If public opinion were to be decisive, Chaskalson reasoned, there would be no need for constitutional assessment and adjudication. Although popular sentiment could have some bearing on the court's considerations, "in itself, it is no substitute for the duty vested in the Courts to interpret the Constitution and to uphold its provisions without fear or favour." This was consistent with South Africa's recent passage from parliamentary sovereignty to supremacy of the constitution.

== See also ==
- Capital punishment in South Africa
- Mohamed v President of the Republic of South Africa
