= Johann Kriegler =

South African judge

Justice of the Constitutional Court
- In office 14 February 1995 – 29 November 2002
- Appointed by: Nelson Mandela
- Succeeded by: Dikgang Moseneke

Chairman of the Electoral Commission
- In office 7 July 1997 – 26 January 1999
- Appointed by: Nelson Mandela
- Deputy: Brigalia Bam
- Preceded by: Commission established
- Succeeded by: Brigalia Bam

Judge of the Supreme Court
- In office 1993–1995
- Appointed by: F. W. de Klerk
- Division: Appellate Division
- In office 1984–1993
- Appointed by: P. W. Botha
- Division: Transvaal Provincial Division

Personal details
- Born: Johann Christiaan Kriegler; 29 November 1932 (age 93) Pretoria, Transvaal; Union of South Africa
- Spouse: Betty Welz
- Education: University of Pretoria; University of South Africa

Johann Christiaan Kriegler (born 29 November 1932) is a retired South African judge who served in the Constitutional Court of South Africa from February 1995 to November 2002. Formerly a practising silk in Johannesburg, he joined the bench as a judge of the Transvaal Provincial Division in 1984. He was also the first chairperson of the post-apartheid Independent Electoral Commission and Electoral Commission of South Africa.

An Afrikaner from Pretoria, Kriegler was called to the Johannesburg Bar as an advocate in 1959 and took silk in 1972. In addition to his trial advocacy, he gained prominence for his involvement in human rights law, particularly as founding chairperson of Lawyers for Human Rights from 1981. Upon gaining judicial appointment, he served in the Supreme Court of South Africa from 1984 to 1995, first in the Transvaal Division and then, from 1993, in the Appellate Division. President Nelson Mandela elevated him to the inaugural bench of the Constitutional Court upon the court's inception, and he served in the apex court until his retirement in November 2002.

While a sitting judge, Kriegler was appointed to chair the Electoral Commission in December 1993, and he oversaw both the administration of the first post-apartheid election in April 1994 and the commission's own establishment as a permanent institution. Both before and after his retirement, he was active in international engagements on electoral disputes and judicial independence, notably as chairperson of Kenya's Kriegler Commission in 2008. In addition, from 2008 to 2023, he was the founding chairperson of Freedom Under Law, a prominent non-profit organisation which aims to promote the rule of law in South Africa.

== Early life and education ==
The son of an Afrikaner professional soldier, Kriegler was born in Pretoria on 29 November 1932. He matriculated in 1949 at the King Edward VII School in Johannesburg and attended the South African Military Academy for two years thereafter. In 1954, he graduated with a BA degree from the University of Pretoria, where he was politically active as an opponent of the apartheid-era National Party government. After that, he completed his LLB in 1958, earned by correspondence through the University of South Africa while he was working as a judicial clerk.

== Legal practice ==
In 1959, Kriegler was called to the Johannesburg Bar, where he practised as an advocate for the next 25 years; he took silk in 1972. He was a prominent trial lawyer with a varied client list that included poet Breyten Breytenbach, homeland leaders Mangosuthu Buthelezi and Lucas Mangope, activist cleric Beyers Naudé, white politicians Eschel Rhoodie and Eugene Terreblanche, and the Church of Scientology. Breytenbach, whom Kriegler defended against treason charges, described Kriegler in his memoir as "the rarest of all Afrikaners; a completely honest man profoundly inspired by humane principles".

Johann has a way with words. He uses them as an artist uses paint to create powerful and at times irresistible images in support of his arguments. In his hands a hopeless case could be made to assume reasonable proportions; a good case would become unanswerable. Had he practised in the days of jury trials he might never have lost a case.

— Chief Justice Arthur Chaskalson, 28 November 2002

During his career as an advocate, Kriegler chaired the Johannesburg Bar Council in 1977 and 1980, and he also served a term as secretary of the General Council of the Bar of South Africa. At the same time, he was involved in human rights and public interest advocacy, particularly as a founding trustee of the Legal Resources Centre from 1978 to 1988 and as the founding chairperson of Lawyers for Human Rights from 1981. He also drafted the constitution of the Christian Institute, served as national president of Verligte Aksie, and served on the Transvaal board of the Urban Foundation.

Kriegler later described himself as having been committed to free market capitalism: a "vehement opponent of socialism and certainly its extreme form of Marxism... [but] a human-rights lawyer, an anticommunist human-rights lawyer, with a fairly strong religious background to it". Of his involvement in advocacy, he said that, "I was not a revolutionary. I was perfectly happy... to agitate, to advocate, to bring pressure to bear, to try to bring conscience to bear on decent members of my own language group. To some extent it succeeded."

== Supreme Court: 1984–1995 ==
Kriegler served intermittently as an acting judge between 1976 and 1983, and in 1984 he was appointed permanently as a judge of the Transvaal Provincial Division of the Supreme Court of South Africa. He was an acting judge in the Appellate Division from 1990 until 1993, when he was elevated permanently.

=== Jurisprudence ===
Although his judgments covered a large variety of areas of law, he was a particular authority on criminal procedure, and in 1993 he authored the fifth edition of Hiemstra's Suid-Afrikaanse strafproses, an authoritative textbook on the subject. The Mail & Guardian later said that he and John Didcott were the only apartheid-era judges "of whom it could truly be said there were no major moral blemishes on their legal records... judges who were invariably guided by the principles of equality and dignity". Defending Kriegler's human rights credentials, George Bizos pointed in particular to Kriegler's refusal to resign from the Legal Resources Centre, despite a contrary instruction from the apartheid government and Chief Justice Pierre Rabie.

=== 1994 general election ===
In December 1993, during the final stages of the negotiations to end apartheid, Kriegler was appointed as chairperson of the Independent Electoral Commission, which was tasked with administering South African's first elections under universal suffrage. He later explained that he had accepted the job because of a "grave misunderstanding": he had spoken with the Minister of Home Affairs over telephone while on holiday in the Natal South Coast, and, due to poor telephone service, had believed himself to be accepting a position on the Electoral Court. Dikgang Moseneke was appointed as Kriegler's deputy.

The elections were held less than six months later, on 26 April 1994, despite ongoing political violence and a short-lived boycott by the Inkatha Freedom Party. In Kriegler's summation, "Probably because we knew no better, we pulled it off." Shortly afterwards, in July 1994, the post-apartheid government appointed him as chairperson of the Commission of Inquiry into Unrest in Prisons.

== Constitutional Court: 1995–2002 ==
Later in 1994, In the aftermath of the general election and pursuant to an interview with the Judicial Service Commission, President Nelson Mandela appointed Kriegler as a judge of the Constitutional Court of South Africa, which would be newly established under the Interim Constitution. He was among the 11 judges sworn into the apex court's inaugural bench on 14 February 1995, and he served there until he retired from the judiciary on 29 November 2002, his 70th birthday.

=== Jurisprudence ===
During his tenure in the Constitutional Court, Kriegler wrote opinions in a total of 29 cases: 20 majority judgments (of which 15 were unanimous), five concurring opinions, and four dissenting opinions. In a minority opinion in Fose v Minister of Safety and Security, Kriegler expressed the view that the Constitutional Court's role was to "attempt to synchronise the real world with the ideal construct of a constitutional world created in the image of [constitutional supremacy]", though he also argued extra-curially that it was not within any court's remit "to be seen or to aspire to being seen to be activist". The Mail & Guardian regarded him ultimately as "a flamboyant maverick" comfortable with confronting the executive branch, pointing to his minority opinions in President v Hugo and Du Plessis v De Klerk as examples of his judicial "boldness".

The following is a list of Constitutional Court opinions that Kriegler wrote on behalf of the court's majority.

Kriegler's majority opinions
No.	Case name	Citation	Notes
1	Coetzee v Government; Matiso v Commanding Officer, Port Elizabeth Prison	[1995] ZACC 7	
2	Key v Attorney-General, Cape Provincial Division	[1996] ZACC 25	
3	S v Julies	[1996] ZACC 14	
4	S v Bequinot	[1996] ZACC 21	
5	S v Ntsele	[1997] ZACC 14	
6	Sanderson v Attorney-General, Eastern Cape	[1997] ZACC 18	
7	Wild v Hoffert	[1998] ZACC 5	
8	S v Dlamini; S v Dladla; S v Joubert; S v Schietekat	[1999] ZACC 8	
9	Metcash Trading Limited v Commissioner for the South African Revenue Service	[2000] ZACC 21	
10	Lane and Fey v Dabelstein	[2001] ZACC 14	Co-written with Goldstone.
11	S v Mamabolo	[2001] ZACC 17	
12	Wallach v Selvan and Others	[2001] ZACC 24	
13	Ex Parte Women's Legal Centre, in re: Moise v Greater Germiston Transitional Local Council	[2001] ZACC 2	
14	Minister of Defence v Potsane; Legal Soldier v Minister of Defence	[2001] ZACC 12	
15	President v Gauteng Lions Rugby Union	[2001] ZACC 5	
16	Prince v President of the Law Society of the Cape of Good Hope	[2002] ZACC 1	Co-written with Chaskalson and Ackermann.
17	Ex Parte Minister of Safety and Security, in re: S v Walters	[2002] ZACC 6	
18	Phoebus Apollo Aviation v Minister of Safety and Security	[2002] ZACC 26	

=== Electoral Commission ===
The Constitutional Court, where Kriegler served for seven years

After the 1994 election, Kriegler was centrally involved in founding the permanent Electoral Commission of South Africa, which superseded the Independent Electoral Commission in 1996; he was appointed as its inaugural chairperson. By the end of his time at the commission, he was viewed as an "expert in electoral drip-feed tension". Indeed, in this role, Kriegler had increasingly strained relations with Mandela's African National Congress government: among other things, he was a vocal critic of the government's decision to strengthen voter identification requirements (in particular by requiring the universal use of bar-coded identification documents for voter registration), and in July 1998, he threatened to resign if the government did not augment the commission's budget.

On 26 January 1999, ahead of that year's general election, Kriegler resigned from the Electoral Commission. Addressing the press after the announcement, he denied that his decision was related to the voter identification or budget disputes; instead, he said that he had found it increasingly burdensome to lead the commission while serving as a sitting judge, and that "persisting differences of opinion about the role and function of the commission" had added to this burden. He was succeeded by his former deputy, Brigalia Bam.

=== International activities ===
During and after his stint at the South African Electoral Commission, Kriegler was also involved in democracy promotion initiatives abroad: he participated in a National Democratic Institute mission to Angola in 1999; in International Commission of Jurists missions on judicial independence in Palestine (2002) and Malawi (2002); and judicial and advocacy training in various other countries. In addition, he was briefed by the United Nations Electoral Assistance Division on election-related assignments in various countries. When he supervised East Timor's independence referendum, he was harshly criticised by South African Justice Minister Penuell Maduna, who told the press that the extra-curial activities of Kriegler and Justice Richard Goldstone demonstrated that Constitutional Court justices were under-worked and lazy.

== Retirement ==
After his retirement in November 2002, Kriegler spent two further years training South African aspirant judges, prosecutors, and advocates, in which capacity he co-drafted the judicial code of conduct. He is an extraordinary professor of law at his alma mater, the University of Pretoria, and is also a longtime board member of the university's Centre for Human Rights. He has also served as a trustee for a number of charitable organisations, including the Nelson Mandela Children's Fund, the AIDS Law Project and SECTION27, the Constitutional Court Trust, and the International Foundation for Electoral Systems. He also arbitrates commercial disputes.

=== Freedom Under Law and Hlophe dispute ===
In 2008, Kriegler became the founding chairman of Freedom Under Law (FUL), a non-profit organisation newly established to promote the rule of law in Southern Africa through public advocacy and strategic litigation. During the organisation's official launch in September 2009, Kriegler announced that FUL would seek judicial review of the Judicial Service Commission's recent decision to drop its investigation into Cape Judge President John Hlophe, who was accused of attempting to influence the Constitutional Court's decision in Thint v NDPP, a politically sensitive case. Kriegler said that the decision was "gravely harmful to the rule of law".

Kriegler had engaged in a minor public spat with Hlophe the prior month – after he made critical comments during a public lecture at Witwatersrand University – and FUL's announcement deepened the controversy. Three FUL members resigned from advisory positions in response: while Kgomotso Moroka and Cyril Ramaphosa said only that they had not been consulted on FUL's legal action, Dumisa Ntsebeza told the press that he was concerned about "the statements and words which are attributed to Judge Kriegler in the media. It's impossible to live with a very clear patronising attitude toward black people, which has become a recurring theme in his [Kriegler's] statements." Kriegler said that FUL would nonetheless proceed with the legal action, saying:

I was frightened at the prospect, I am still frightened at the prospect, but fortunately I had an old boer grandfather who taught me as jou voet in die stiebeuel is moet jy ry [Afrikaans for 'when your foot is in the stirrup, you’ve got to ride']. We’ve got to go with it now... I am far too vain an old man to grow a thick skin, but all I can do is wrap myself in the blanket of duty.

The resulting legal and disciplinary processes continued for over a decade. On 1 March 2021, the Sunday Times quoted Kriegler, speaking on behalf of FUL, as making further critical remarks about Hlophe, including the propositions that Hlophe was not fit to be a judge and that he had employed "contrived reasoning" in acquitting politician Bongani Bongo of corruption. Hlophe's lawyer, Vuyo Ngalwana, laid a complaint against Kriegler at the Judicial Service Commission, alleging that Kriegler had misconducted himself in making these remarks publicly. In July 2022, in a ruling penned by Judge Dumisani Zondi, the Judicial Conduct Committee found against Kriegler, ordering him to retract his statement.

Kriegler retired from the board of Freedom Under Law on 30 July 2023, ceding the chairmanship to retired judge Azhar Cachalia.

=== International consulting ===
He also continued his engagements as an international consultant on electoral and judicial matters, including on behalf of the International Commission of Jurists, the United Nations Electoral Assistance Division, and the International Bar Association. In 2008, he chaired the Kriegler Commission, established to recommend electoral reforms in Kenya following the 2007 presidential election and subsequent political crisis; and in 2010 he and Safwat Sidqi were the international members whom Afghan President Hamid Karzai appointed to the Electoral Complaints Commission which adjudicated disputes arising from the 2010 Afghan parliamentary election.

== Awards and honours ==
In 2003, the General Council of the Bar of South Africa presented Kriegler with its Sydney and Felicia Kentridge Award for Service to Law in Southern Africa, and in 2011, he received the International Foundation for Electoral Systems's Charles T. Manatt Democracy Award for outstanding commitment to democracy and human rights. He is an honorary life member of the Johannesburg Bar and an honorary bencher of Gray's Inn, London.

== Personal life ==
He has six children and three step-children.
