= Arthur Chaskalson =

South African judge (1931–2012)

Chief Justice of South Africa
- In office November 2001 – June 2005
- President: Thabo Mbeki
- Deputy: Pius Langa
- Preceded by: Ismail Mahomed
- Succeeded by: Pius Langa

President of the Constitutional Court of South Africa
- In office June 1994 – November 2001
- President: Nelson Mandela
- Deputy: Pius Langa
- Preceded by: Office established

Personal details
- Born: 24 November 1931 Johannesburg, South Africa
- Died: 1 December 2012 (aged 81) Johannesburg, South Africa
- Resting place: Westpark Cemetery, Johannesburg
- Spouse: Lorraine Chaskalson
- Children: Matthew and Jerome
- Education: University of the Witwatersrand

Arthur Chaskalson SCOB, (24 November 1931 – 1 December 2012) was President of the Constitutional Court of South Africa from 1994 to 2001 and Chief Justice of South Africa from 2001 to 2005. Chaskalson was a member of the defence team in the Rivonia Trial of 1963.

== Early life and career ==
Born in Johannesburg, Chaskalson was educated at Hilton College and later graduated from the University of the Witwatersrand with a BCom (1952) and LLB Cum Laude (1954).

In 1963, Chaskalson, along with Bram Fischer, Joel Joffe, Harry Schwarz, George Bizos, Vernon Berrangé and Harold Hanson, was part of the former President Nelson Mandela's defence team in the Rivonia Trial, which saw Mandela sentenced to life imprisonment.

Chaskalson left a very successful legal practice to become a human rights lawyer, helping to establish the Legal Resources Centre, a non-profit organisation modeled after the NAACP Legal Defense and Educational Fund in the United States seeking to use the law to pursue justice and human rights around South Africa. Chaskalson served as the centre's director from November 1978 until September 1993. In 1975 and 1983, he was leading counsel in the cases of Veli Komani and Mehlolo Tom Rikhotso, which successfully challenged the legality of apartheid legislation seeking to establish "influx control," crippling the government's ability to enforce influx control laws.

== Constitutional Court ==
As the first president of South Africa's new Constitutional Court in 1994, and then later Chief Justice of the same court (following a Constitutional amendment act in 2001 which changed his title), Chaskalson gained a reputation as one of South Africa's leading jurists in constitutional and human rights issues. Chaskalson was a member of the technical committee on constitutional issues appointed by the multi-party negotiating forum in May 1993, acting as a key advisor on the adoption of the Interim Constitution of South Africa in 1993, and was regarded as one of the prime movers of a changing judiciary in South Africa during his time on the bench of the Constitutional Court.

The court's first major decision under Chaskalson's leadership abolished the death penalty in S v Makwanyane on 6 June 1995. He also wrote notable majority judgments in Soobramoney v Minister of Health, KwaZulu-Natal and Minister of Public Works v Kyalami Ridge Environmental Association, and he co-wrote Fedsure Life Assurance v Greater Johannesburg Transitional Metropolitan Council with Justices Richard Goldstone and Kate O'Regan.

Chaskalson also became prominent internationally, becoming commissioner of the International Commission of Jurists in 1995 before being selected as one of South Africa's four members on the United Nations Permanent Court of Arbitration in 1999. In 1989, he consulted on the writing of the Constitution of Namibia. He became the President of the International Commission of Jurists then from 2002 until 2008.

== Retirement ==
On 31 May 2005, Chaskalson retired as Chief Justice and was replaced by his former deputy Pius Langa. In his 2005 State of the Nation speech shortly before Chaskalson's retirement, South African President Thabo Mbeki praised the Chief Justice as a "great son of our people" and a "giant among the architects of our democracy". Mbeki paid tribute to Chaskalson for everything he had done "as a South African, a lawyer and a judge, to shepherd us towards the construction of a South Africa that truly belongs to all who live in it".

He died in Johannesburg on 1 December 2012 from leukemia and was buried in Westpark Cemetery.

== Personal life ==
Chaskalson was survived by his wife Lorraine, with whom he had two sons and five grandchildren. Chaskalson was Jewish and was associated with Progressive synagogues in Johannesburg.

== Honours and awards ==
In 2002 he was awarded the Order of the Baobab (Gold) for "exceptional service in law, constitutional jurisprudence and human rights".

Legal offices
Preceded by Ismail Mahomed	Chief Justice of South Africa; 2001–2005	Succeeded by Pius Langa

== See also ==
- Constitutional Court of South Africa
- Constitution of South Africa
- List of Constitutional Court opinions of Arthur Chaskalson
