= Veenendal v Minister of Justice =

South African legal case

Veenendal v Minister of Justice is an important case in South African law, especially in the area of criminal procedure. It was heard in the Transvaal Provincial Division J on September 1, 1992, by Mahomed, who handed down judgment on September 3. D. Bisschoff appeared for the applicant, and DS Fourie for the respondent.

== Facts ==
An applicant for bail, on a continuous hunger fast, stated that he was prepared to comply with any condition of bail which the court might attach to his release, and that he would resume eating if bail were granted.

== Judgment ==
This raised an important question of judicial policy. The court held that the applicant's statement constituted a basic and untenable challenge to the legitimacy and the credibility of the South African legal system and its courts. No court could retain any legitimacy or credibility if it were compelled to succumb to this kind of pressure. There was, in principle, no difference between the position of a man who says, "Release me or I will ensure that I die," and a man who says, "Release me or I will kill somebody else" or "Release me or I will kill my wife" or "Release me or I will kill a hostage." If the courts were to surrender to this kind of pressure, the very foundations of justice would be subverted in a manner which might do irreversible damage to the image of justice and to the values upon which any civilised system of law must be based.

The court had an inherent jurisdiction to grant bail to a person who had been committed to prison by a magistrate in terms of the Extradition Act, even though no appeal was pending against the magistrate's finding under section 10(1).

== See also ==
- Criminal procedure in South Africa
