= Criminal procedure in South Africa =

Process of administering the criminal law

Criminal procedure in South Africa refers to the adjudication process of that country's criminal law. It forms part of procedural or adjectival law, and describes the means by which its substantive counterpart, South African criminal law, is applied. It has its basis mainly in English law.

== History ==
When the British occupied the Cape permanently in 1806, they retained the Roman-Dutch legal system. They concluded, however, that the criminal justice system was archaic, and so introduced one based on their own in 1828. It has been developed over the years to suit local conditions.

The South African system today is basically accusatorial: that is, the state accuses and the accused defends. The accusation and its proof are state-driven, with a state-appointed prosecuting authority.

== Sources ==
The sources of South African criminal procedure lie in the Constitution, the Criminal Procedure Act, 1977 (CPA), other statute law (for example, the Magistrates' Courts Act, 1944, the Supreme Court Act, 1959 and the Drugs and Drug Trafficking Act, 1992) and the common law. Criminal procedure overlaps with other branches of the law, like the law of evidence and the substantive law.

== Stages ==
Criminal procedure can be divided into three stages or phases, namely pre-trial, trial and post-trial. These divisions are not absolutely watertight.

== Child Justice Act ==
The Child Justice Act, 2008, in operation since April 2010, has introduced numerous changes to criminal procedure insofar as it affects minors (persons under the age of eighteen). It involves a two-stage trial procedure in a special child justice court.

== Methods of getting an accused to court ==
The Criminal Procedure Act, 1977 lists four methods of securing the attendance of an accused person in court. These bear an important relationship to the constitutional rights of freedom and security of the person, of freedom of movement and residence, of access to the courts and of "arrested, detained and accused persons." The methods are as follows:

1. arrest;
2. summons (for lower courts only);
3. written notice in terms of section 56 of the CPA (for magistrates' courts only); and
4. indictment (for the High Court only).

The basic principle of South African criminal procedure is that of access to courts, in accordance with section 34 of the Constitution. There is no general provision for trial in absentia.

=== Arrest ===
The manner in which arrests are to be carried out is dealt with in section 39(1) of the Act, which provides that arrests may be effected with or without warrant, and which envisages three scenarios:

- that the arrestee will submit to custody;
- that he must have his body touched by the arrestor; or
- that, if need be, his body must be forcibly confined.

He is then to be informed of the cause of the arrest or, in case of an arrest with a warrant, to be given on demand a copy of the warrant. The effect of the arrest is that the arrestee is in lawful custody.

It is very important that the arrest be effected lawfully. If the arrest is not lawful, resistance or escape by the arrestee will not be unlawful, and the arrestor will have committed an assault. Furthermore, subsequent detention would also be unlawful, with the possibility of civil damages. The ensuing trial, however, would not automatically be invalid.

Male inhabitants of South Africa, between the ages of sixteen and sixty, are obliged to assist with the arrest if called upon to do so by a police official. Failure to comply with such a request without lawful cause attracts criminal liability.

Anyone who may lawfully arrest a person and who knows or reasonably suspects that person to be on certain premises may, after audibly demanding access, giving reasons, if necessary break open and enter to search and arrest the suspect.

==== Warrant ====
===== Without warrant =====
Peace officers—that is to say, police officials and other empowered officials—may arrest without a warrant in the circumstances set out in section 40. The most important of these circumstances are:

- when any person commits or attempts to commit an offence in the presence of that peace officer;
- when the peace officer reasonably suspects any person of having committed a Schedule 1 offence (other than the offence of escaping from lawful custody);
- when any person has escaped or attempts to escape from lawful custody.

As to "reasonable suspicion," the most important case is Duncan v Minister of Law and Order, along with Ralekwa v Minister of Safety and Security, S v Reabow and, more generally, Ramphal v Minister of Safety and Security.

The peace officer may call on the person whom he has the power to arrest, or whom he reasonably suspects of having committed or attempted to commit any offence, or whom, in the opinion of the peace officer, may be able to give evidence of the offence or suspected offence, to furnish his full name and address. Failure to comply with such a request constitutes an offence.

Private persons may arrest without warrant in the circumstances set out in section 42. The following are the most important of those types of person whom private persons may arrest without a warrant:

- any person who commits or attempts to commit a Schedule 1 offence in his presence, or whom he reasonably suspects of having committed a Schedule 1 offence;
- any person whom he reasonably believes
  - to have committed any offence;
  - to be escaping from a person whom he reasonably believes to have the authority to arrest that person for that offence; and
  - to be freshly pursued by that person; and
- any person found committing an offence on property owned or lawfully occupied by the private person.

As to the question of whether a person who is otherwise entitled to arrest without warrant is obliged to consider whether a less invasive method would suffice to secure the attendance of the accused before court, previously the Appellate Division held that such a person could do so even if there was available a satisfactory but less invasive method of securing attendance. In S v Tsotsi, the court held that such an arrest is unlawful if its objective is to frighten and harass the arrested person to stop a particular conduct rather to bring him to court for trial.

It was recently held that this is no longer the position, and that now the potential arrestor must also consider whether arresting the suspect would be reasonable in the circumstances, but the Supreme Court of Appeal (SCA) has since differed from this line of case law, effectively reinstating Tsotsi.

===== With warrant =====
A magistrate or justice of peace may issue a warrant of arrest on written application of the Director of Public Prosecutions (DPP), a public prosecutor or a commissioned police officer (from the rank of captain upwards). The application must

- set out the alleged offence;
- allege either that the offence was committed within the area of jurisdiction of the magistrate or justice of the peace, or that the person to be arrested is known or reasonably believed to be within that area of jurisdiction; and
- state that, from information on oath, there is a reasonable suspicion that the person sought has committed the alleged offence.

Warrants are executed by peace officers. Telegraphic or similar written or printed communication from the magistrate or justice of peace, stating that the warrant has been issued, is sufficient to authorise the peace officer to effect the arrest.

==== After arrest ====
After arrest, the arrestee is to be brought to the police station. As soon as possible thereafter, the arrestee must be informed of his right to institute bail proceedings. If an arrestee is not released, he must be brought before a lower court as soon as reasonably possible, but not later than 48 hours after the arrest. The period of 48 hours may be extended in the following circumstances:

- If it expires after normal court hours, or on a day which is not an ordinary court day, the period expires at 16:00 on the next court day thereafter.
- If the arrestee's physical condition does not permit a court appearance, the court may, on application of the prosecutor, supported by a medical certificate, authorise detention of the arrestee at a specified place (such as a hospital) for the purpose of recuperation.
- If an arrestee is in transit to the court from an area outside the court's jurisdiction, the period expires at 16:00 on the day following that on which he is brought within the court's area of jurisdiction.

The Constitution enshrines this principle.

The term "normal court day" does not cover the situation of periodical courts, which do not sit daily. Authorities are not entitled to keep the arrestee in custody pending the next sitting of a periodical court, if that would mean a longer delay than that permitted in the case of ordinary courts sitting each weekday. In such a case, the police would have to take the arrestee to the main court of the district for his first court appearance.

If officials detain a person without lawful authority, the detainee, or someone on his behalf, may bring an interdictum de homine libero exhibendo application, which is a special type of mandamus, to compel his release. In England, this is referred to as a habeas corpus application; that term, indeed, is sometimes used in South African law.

== Bail ==
The purpose of bail is to minimise the impact on an accused's freedom at a stage when he has not yet been convicted. Bail is governed by Chapter 9, a "complex and interlocking mechanism," of the Criminal Procedure Act, 1977.

As to the question of whether a High Court has inherent power to grant bail, or whether bail release powers are only to be found explicitly in statute, earlier cases inclined to the view that a High Court did not have inherent power to release on bail if a statute law did not give it express power. More recently the courts have inclined to the view that they do have an inherent, common-law power to release a person on bail even if there is no statutory provision permitting it.

Bail applications are always matters of urgency. Bail (or the refusal thereof) is entirely non-penal in character: Its refusal may not serve as a punishment; nor may a court fix an excessive amount or onerous conditions, in a bid to harass the accused. It is not anticipatory punishment. When considering bail applications, the courts should ignore improper pressure: for example, the threat that the accused will go on hunger strike if bail is refused, or that people opposed to bail will resort to illegal activity if bail is granted. The rules of evidence for the purpose of bail are relaxed.

The nature of bail, according to the Criminal Procedure Act, 1977, is that of a contract between the accused and the state, whereby the accused is to be released from custody upon payment of an amount fixed, or upon the furnishing of an acceptable guarantee, and whereby, in turn, the accused is to appear at the date and place which has been appointed for the trial or to which proceedings have been adjourned. His release is to endure until the verdict, not until the sentence, unless the court upon verdict decides to extend bail. The accused must comply with the conditions set out in sections 60(12), 62 and 63 of the Act.

In terms of section 59 of the Criminal Procedure Act, 1977, a police official of the rank of sergeant or higher may fix bail before the first court appearance if the offence for which the accused is in custody does not fall under Part II or Part III of a Schedule 2 offence: that is to say, where the offence is generally of a less serious nature.

In terms of section 59A, the DPP, or a prosecutor authorised by the DPP, may authorise the release of a person on bail before his first court appearance if the accused is in custody on a Schedule 7 offence. A Schedule 7 offence is generally slightly more serious than that for which police may fix bail under section 59: for example, culpable homicide, assault, grievous bodily harm, robbery, theft and fraud (where the amount involved does not exceed R20,000) and possession of drugs.

It is a general principle that the accused is entitled to be released on bail at any stage prior to his conviction if the court is satisfied that the interests of justice so permit. This principle, enshrined in the Constitution, is restated in the Criminal Procedure Act, 1977. Bail lapses on conviction, unless specifically extended. The court must raise the issue of bail if it has not already been raised by the prosecutor or by the accused.

The following are the general powers or duties of the court at bail hearings:

- to postpone proceedings if necessary;
- to acquire the information needed for a decision in an informal manner, if the prosecutor and the accused do not dispute this;
- to require the prosecutor or the accused to lead evidence of matters in dispute;
- to require (which is mandatory) that the prosecutor place reasons on the record if he does not oppose bail on a charge of a Schedule 5 or 6 offence; and
- to order that further evidence or information be placed before the court if such is necessary for it to reach decision.

The court is required first to consider, in principle, whether or not bail should be granted, and then to enquire into a suitable amount of money in view of the accused's circumstances. During the enquiry, the accused may supply evidence by affidavit instead of giving oral evidence, although affidavit evidence carries less weight than oral evidence.

=== When the interests of justice do not permit release on bail ===
Sometimes the interests of justice do not permit release on bail. Overall, in weighing up whether the interests of justice favour release or otherwise, the court has regard to the interests of justice as against the rights of the accused, and the prejudice the accused is likely to suffer if not released. The following factors can be relevant:

- the accused's period already in custody since his arrest;
- the probable period of detention until the disposal of the case if there is no release;
- the reason for delay, and whether the fault is the accused's;
- the financial loss the accused may suffer on account of his detention;
- any impediment to the defence which detention may cause;
- the accused's health; and
- any other factor.

S v Acheson is of general interest in this regard.

==== Public or individual safety ====
In considering whether or not there is a likelihood that the accused, if released, would endanger the safety of the public or an individual, or would commit a Schedule 1 offence, the court takes the following into account:

- the degree of violence implicit in the charge;
- a threat of violence the accused may have made to any person;
- any resentment the accused is alleged to harbour towards any person;
- the accused's disposition towards violence as evidenced by his past conduct;
- the disposition of the accused to commit Schedule I offences, as evidenced by past conduct;
- the prevalence of a particular type of offence;
- any evidence that the accused has previously committed a Schedule 1 offence while out on bail; and
- any other factor.

Certain of these grounds are part of the common law on bail.

==== Evasion of trial ====
In considering the likelihood that the accused will attempt to evade trial if released, the court takes into account the following:

- the emotional, family, community or occupational ties of the accused to the place of trial;
- any assets held by the accused, and where;
- any means, and travel documents held by the accused, which may enable flight from the country;
- the extent, if any, to which the accused could afford to forfeit the bail money;
- the ease of extradition in the event of flight across the border;
- the nature and gravity of the charge;
- the strength of the state's case;
- the nature and gravity of punishment in the event of conviction;
- the binding effect and enforceability of possible bail conditions, and the ease with which these conditions could be breached; and
- any other factor.

Certain of these grounds are also part of the common law. In S v Hudson, it was held that the likely heavy sentence in the event of conviction is also a factor, as is the foreign nationality of accused, while S v Lulane the matter of the strength of the state's case was also invoked.

==== Influence or intimidation of witnesses ====
In considering the likelihood that the accused will attempt to influence or intimidate witnesses, or conceal or destroy evidence, court takes into account the following:

- whether the accused is familiar with the identity of the witnesses and the evidence they can give;
- whether the witnesses have already made statements and have agreed to testify;
- whether the police investigation of the case has been completed;
- the relationship of the accused to the witnesses and the extent of possible influence or intimidation;
- how effective would be possible bail conditions prohibiting communication with witnesses;
- whether the accused has access to evidentiary material which is to be presented at trial;
- the ease with which evidentiary material could be concealed or destroyed; and
- any other factor.

Certain of these grounds are part of the common law.

==== Undermining criminal justice system ====
In considering the likelihood that the accused, if released, will undermine or jeopardise the objectives of the proper functioning of the criminal justice system, including the bail system, the court takes into account the following:

- whether the accused deliberately supplied false information at the time of his arrest or during bail proceedings;
- whether the accused is in custody on another charge, or is on parole;
- any previous failure to comply with bail conditions, or any indication that the accused will not comply this time; and
- any other factor.

==== Public order ====
In considering the likelihood that release will disturb the public order or undermine public peace or security, the court takes into account the following:

- whether the nature or circumstances of the offence are likely to induce a sense of shock or outrage in the community in which it was committed;
- whether such shock or outrage might lead to public disorder if the accused were to be released;
- whether the safety of the accused might be jeopardised by his release;
- whether the sense of peace or security of the public would be undermined or jeopardised by his release;
- whether his release would undermine or jeopardise public confidence in the criminal justice system; and
- any other factor.

On the issue of possible disturbance of public order, the cases of S v Mohammed and S v Bennett are relevant.

=== When the onus is on the accused ===
In certain circumstances, the onus will be on the accused during the bail application. For a Schedule 6 offence, the accused has to adduce evidence to satisfy the court that exceptional circumstances exist in which the interests of justice permit his release. For a Schedule 5 offence, the accused has to adduce evidence to satisfy the court that the interests of justice permit his release. The court hearing such a bail application, when the offence is a Schedule 5 or 6 offence, must conduct a careful enquiry before deciding to release the accused on bail. (There must be proper proof that the offence is indeed a scheduled offence.) S v Rudolph is a prominent example of the application of this onus.

==== Proof that offence is a Schedule 5 or 6 offence ====
The DPP may issue written confirmation that he intends to charge the accused with a scheduled offence. This is prima facie proof of the charge to be brought.

==== Duty to disclose information regarding previous convictions ====
The accused or his legal adviser is compelled to inform court of

- any previous convictions; and
- whether he has any other charges pending, and whether he has been released on bail in respect thereof.

=== Record ===
The record of bail proceedings forms part of the trial record. The court has a duty to warn the accused that anything said by him in evidence during bail proceedings may be used in evidence against him at trial. Bail proceedings are to be recorded in full.

=== Docket ===
The accused is not ordinarily entitled to the police docket, etcetera, for the purpose of a bail application. The prosecutor, however, may waive this provision.

=== Constitutionality ===
As to the constitutionality of the provisions in section 60, sections 60(4) to 60(9), 60(11)(a), 60(11B)(c) and 60(14) were held to be constitutional in S v Dlamini.

=== Conditions ===
Bail may be granted subject to conditions. The following general principles apply to conditions of bail:

- They must not be contra bonos mores.
- They must not be vague or ambiguous.
- They must not be ultra vires.
- They should be practicably feasible.

Further conditions may be added subsequently on application by the prosecutor. This provision also gives a useful list of the types of conditions that may be imposed at the outset. The court has the power to increase or reduce the amount of bail, or to amend or supplement any condition, on application by the prosecutor or the accused.

=== Heads of prisons ===
The power of the head of a prison to apply in certain circumstances for release on warning instead of bail, or amendment of bail conditions, is regulated by section 63A, which is a radical new measure aimed at permitting a head of prison to initiate release on bail when the conditions (due to overcrowding, for example) of awaiting-trial prisoners become intolerable.

=== Appeals ===
Appeals are permitted to the High Court against a refusal of bail by a lower court, or against the amount or conditions of bail. The appeal shall not lie on the basis of new facts, unless such facts are first brought before the lower court which dealt with the bail application. As to what is meant by "new facts," see S v Petersen.

Appeals are also permitted by the DPP to the High Court against a decision to release on bail, or against a bail condition. This is a new measure. The DPP requires leave to appeal. This section (65) should be read with sections 65(1)(b) and (c), and sections 65(2), (3) and (4).

=== Failure of accused to observe conditions of bail ===
In terms of section 66, the prosecutor may apply to court to have bail cancelled on grounds of noncompliance with the conditions of bail. If the accused is present and disputes the allegation, the court will hear evidence. If he is absent, the court will issue a warrant for his arrest, and then decide the issue when the accused is present. If the court finds fault on part of the accused, bail may be cancelled and bail money forfeited to the state.

=== Failure of accused to appear ===
If the accused on bail fails to appear in court on the due date, the court will declare bail provisionally cancelled and bail money provisionally forfeited, and will issue a warrant of arrest. If the accused appears within fourteen days, the court will enquire into his absence. It will then confirm the cancellation and forfeiture unless the accused shows no fault. This provision contains a reverse onus, and a similar reverse onus in the case of non-appearance, after release on warning was modified by the Constitutional Court in S v Singo to read that the onus is on the State.

=== Criminal liability for failure to appear or failure to observe a condition of bail ===
Section 67A now makes it a criminal offence not to appear when on bail, or not to observe a condition of bail.

=== Cancellation of bail in circumstances other than sections 66 and 67 ===
In terms of section 68, bail may also be cancelled by the court in the following circumstances:

- when the accused is about to evade justice or abscond;
- when the accused has interfered with witnesses, or threatened or attempted to interfere with them;
- when the accused has defeated or attempted to defeat the ends of justice;
- when the accused poses a threat to the safety of the public or an individual;
- when the accused has not fully disclosed all previous convictions during the bail hearing;
- when further evidence or factors come to light (including falsity of information during bail proceedings) which might have affected the decision to grant bail; and
- if generally it is in the interests of justice.

=== Release on warning in lieu of bail ===
The court may release the accused on warning instead of bail. Conditions may be imposed, as with release on bail. Failure to attend or to comply with a condition is a criminal offence. The Constitutional Court has inserted words into this section to "read down" the reverse-onus provision.

== Bail pending appeal ==
When an appeal against a conviction or sentence or order of a lower court is noted, this does not automatically suspend the operation of the sentence unless the court releases the convicted person on bail. If the convicted person was out on bail for trial, the court granting bail pending appeal (or review) may extend bail, in the same amount or in any other amount.

If the convicted person was not previously on bail for the trial, the court may release him on bail on condition that he deposits the stated amount. The court may permit the convicted person to furnish a guarantee instead of cash. It shall be a condition of release that the convicted person shall surrender himself at the time and place specified by court, and upon service of notice in the prescribed manner, to commence the sentence, in the event that the convicted person still has to undergo imprisonment after the disposal of the appeal.

The court may add conditions deemed necessary or advisable in interests of justice, as to, for example,

- reporting;
- places where the convicted person may not go (for example, to any airport); and
- other matters relating to the conduct of the convicted person.

Sections 63, 64, 65, 66 and 68 of the Criminal Procedure Act, 1977 apply with the necessary changes. This means that

- the court may amend bail conditions subsequently;
- proceedings are to be recorded in full;
- the appeal lies to the High Court against a refusal of bail, or against the amount or conditions of bail;
- the steps to be taken in the event of failure to comply with bail conditions are the same as for the pre-trial accused;
- the bail cancellation provisions are the same as for the pre-trial accused.

The provisions of section 60 do not apply to bail pending appeal, although they may still be relevant to the extent that they embody common-law concepts. The fact that the person is now convicted and sentenced to imprisonment changes the position practically: There is no longer a presumption of innocence, on the one hand; on the other hand, the incentive to evade justice is greater. In principle, bail may be granted even if the case is serious and the convicted person is facing a long period of imprisonment. The key factor is whether or not the convicted person will report for sentence. It is improper to fix an unaffordable amount of bail if there are good prospects of success on appeal.

Even if there is no indication that the convicted person will try to evade justice, bail may be refused on the ground that the prospects of success on appeal are small. Some cases, however, have found that bail should not lightly be refused on this ground alone, especially by the lower courts, which do not have experience in assessing the prospects of a successful appeal.

Logically, a court may refuse bail pending appeal if it is an appeal against the sentence only. At best for the convicted person, whichever way the appeal goes, he will still end up serving a lengthy period of imprisonment. If a convicted person loses his appeal to the High Court, he may still be released on bail pending an application for leave to appeal or petition to the SCA. Some cases have held that the onuses imposed under section 60(11) of the Criminal Procedure Act, 1977 also apply to bail pending appeal. The correctness of these cases is doubtful.

== Ascertainment of bodily features ==
Without the need for a court order, police in certain circumstances may do various things to ascertain the bodily condition, etc., of the accused. The two most important such circumstances are

1. where the accused is a person arrested on any charge; and
2. where he is a person released on bail or on a warning under section 72.

The police so authorised may do certain things themselves, like

- take fingerprints, palm-prints or foot-prints;
- make the arrested person available for an identity parade;
- take photographs; and
- take such steps as are deemed necessary to ascertain whether the person's body has any "mark, characteristic or distinguishing feature," or "shows any condition or appearance." The police may not take a blood sample themselves, however, or examine a female unless the examiner is also female.

In cases in which the police are authorised in terms of these provisions to take the relevant steps, certain medical officers may also take such steps (including the drawing of blood samples) as may be necessary to ascertain whether the body has a "mark, characteristic or distinguishing feature," as contemplated in section 37(2). The medical officer of a prison and a district surgeon do not need a police request to proceed in this way, but other medical practitioners and nurses do.

In terms of section 37(2)(b), a medical practitioner attached to a hospital may take a blood sample of a person admitted to the hospital if he is of the reasonable opinion that such a sample may be relevant at later criminal proceedings. In cases where the police, etc., are not authorised to act under subsections (1) or (2), the court before which criminal proceedings are pending may order the same steps.

If no prosecution is instituted, or if the prosecution has been instituted and the accused acquitted, the fingerprints, etc., are to be destroyed.

=== Constitutionality ===
There have been two types of constitutional challenge to section 37 thus far:

- The taking of samples, etc., violates the accused's right not to incriminate himself, as guaranteed by the Constitution.
- The process of obtaining a sample, etc., violates the accused's constitutional right
  - to dignity;
  - not to be treated in a cruel or inhuman or degrading way; and
  - to bodily and psychological integrity.

As to the first type of challenge, the courts have consistently held that the taking of such samples does not violate one's right not to incriminate oneself. Section 35(3)(j) of the Constitution only covers the right not to incriminate oneself by way of communications.

As to the second type, the courts have held that the provision permitting the obtaining of samples is a reasonable limitation of constitutional rights under section 36 of the Constitution.

=== In practice ===
The types of situations described above frequently take the following forms in practice:

- fingerprints and footprints;
- blood samples (which are often used now for DNA matching, but which can also be used to determine alcohol levels);
- hair samples;
- X-rays (to ascertain, for example, the age of the accused for sentencing purposes);
- identity parades;
- handwriting specimens;
- photographs; and
- voice samples, in respect of which an important case is Levack v Regional Magistrate, where the SCA held that these are included under "distinguishing features."

Also noteworthy is the unusual case of Minister of Safety and Security v Gaqa, where the High Court granted the police an order permitting the surgical removal of a bullet from a suspect's leg to compare it with a firearm used on the scene of the crime. See also Minister of Safety and Security v Xaba.

==== Identity parades ====
To ensure fairness and reliability, there are certain recognised procedures for identity parades. The police also have standing rules to govern identity-parade procedures. Nowadays identity parades are often videotaped to minimise disputes about what occurred in or was established by them. Some specially fitted identity-parade rooms have one-way glass so that witnesses do not feel intimidated by confrontation with possible suspects. Sometimes identity parades are not possible or feasible, in which case photo parades take place. For the suitable conditions for photo parades, see S v Ndika.

== Charges ==
The prosecutor, as dominus litis, decides whom to charge, what charges to bring, how to frame them, etc. Any number of charges may be joined in the same proceedings against the same accused, before any evidence has been led. The charges are to be numbered consecutively (usually as "Count 1," "Count 2" and so on). The court may, if it believes this to be in the interests of justice, direct that one or more charges be tried separately. Such an order may be made even after the plea.

Where there is uncertainty as to which charges the facts will prove, the accused may be charged with all or any of the possibilities at once. Charges may also be framed in the alternative. It is important in this regard to note that an objection may be taken not to the so-called "splitting of charges," but rather to the duplication of convictions.

The charge must contain the following:

- the time of the offence;
- the place of the offence;
- the person against whom the offence was committed (if appropriate); and
- the property in respect of which the offence was committed (if appropriate).

All this is to inform the accused, with reasonable particularity, of the nature of the charge or charges against him.

On the importance of properly informing the accused of the nature of the charge or charges, see S v Wannenburg. On the applicable presumptions, see Moloi v Minister for Justice and Constitutional Affairs.

Where any of the above particulars are unknown to prosecutor, it is sufficient that this be stated in the charge. If the offence is a statutory one, it is sufficient to describe it in the words of the law which created the offence.

An objection to the charge must be taken before the plea. It must be on the grounds that

- the charge does not comply with the relevant provisions of the Criminal Procedure Act, 1977;
- the charge does not set out an essential element of the offence;
- the charge does not disclose an offence (as, for example, when the statute cited has been repealed);
- the charge does not contain sufficient particulars of any matter alleged in the charge; or
- the accused is not correctly named or described in the charge.

The accused must give reasonable notice to the prosecution of his intention to object to the charge, unless the prosecution waives notice.

If the court agrees with the defence's objection, it may order the prosecution to amend the charge or deliver particulars. If the prosecution does not comply, the court may quash the charge.

== Amendment of charges ==
The Constitution provides that the accused is entitled to reasonable clarity about the charge. A court may amend the charge at any time before judgment, if there is no prejudice in doing so to the accused, on one or more of the following grounds:

- want of an essential averment;
- variance between the charge and the evidence;
- missing words or particulars;
- excess words or particulars; and
- any other error.

Amendment is possible even if the original charge discloses no offence. This portion of the legislation was introduced to correct the effect of R v Herschel.

The judge, when granting an amendment, may grant adjournment to the accused if he thinks fit. The basic test is whether or not the accused will be prejudiced. The courts have held that most types of possible prejudice can be cured by suitable adjournment and the opportunity to call or recall witnesses. The fact that the charge is not amended shall not affect the validity of proceedings, unless the court refuses to grant an amendment.

Although amendment is permissible, substitution is not. Substitution is never possible, in fact—even if there would be no prejudice to the accused.

Charges may be amended on appeal or review. The test, again, is prejudice. Where a charge is defective for the want of an averment which is an essential ingredient of the relevant offence, the defect shall, unless brought to the notice of the court before judgment, be cured by evidence at the trial proving the matter which should have been averred. S v Van Wyk is relevant here.

== Plea of guilty ==
Generally speaking, where an accused pleads guilty at his trial there is no issue between him and the State and he may be sentenced, there and then, on his plea. Section 112(1) applies when the accused pleads guilty to the offence charged, or to an offence of which he may be convicted on the charge (for example, a plea of guilty to common assault on a charge of assault with intent to do grievous bodily harm), when the prosecutor accepts that plea. The legal effect of the prosecutor's action in accepting the plea to a lesser offence is illustrated in S v Ngubane.

In terms of section 112(1)(a), the accused pleads guilty to the offence and conviction follows on the plea only. The presiding officer in such circumstances must be of the view that the offence pleaded does not warrant imprisonment without the option of a fine, or a fine exceeding the amount determined by Minister from time to time (currently R1,500). The presiding officer imposes any competent sentence other than imprisonment without option of fine, or a fine exceeding amount determined by Minister. "Imprisonment" here means any form of imprisonment, including periodical imprisonment. This section should not be invoked in serious matters.

In terms of section 112(1)(b), the accused pleads guilty and

1. the presiding officer is of the opinion that the offence merits punishment exceeding the limits provided in section 112(1)(a); or
2. the prosecutor requests that the presiding officer go the route of section 112(1)(b).

The presiding officer questions the accused with reference to the alleged facts to establish whether or not the accused admits the allegations in the charge. The presiding officer may convict if satisfied that the accused is guilty. For the purpose of section 112(1)(b), see S v Mkhize, the Appellate Division's judgment in S v Naidoo and S v Diniso.

On the question of whether or not the accused should be warned of his right to silence, etc., see S v Damons and S v Nkosi, but note Director of Public Prosecutions, Natal v Magidela

=== Basic rules governing questioning ===
The basic rules governing questioning are as follows:

- There is to be no cross-examination of the accused.
- Leading questions should be avoided.
- Questioning should not be confined simply to asking the accused if he admits each allegation.
- The court should not try to persuade the accused that denial of a fact is incorrect or invalid.
- Unnecessary legal terminology should be avoided.
- Care should be taken when the accused asked to admit facts outside his personal knowledge.
- The accused's answers are not evidence that can be evaluated.
- Questioning does not have to eliminate all possible defences.

For an example of grossly irregular questioning, see S v Williams

Section 112(2) provides that, in lieu of questioning under section 112(1)(b), the accused or his legal representative may hand in a written statement setting out the facts admitted and on which he has pleaded guilty. The presiding officer may convict, if satisfied that the accused is guilty, and also question the accused to clarify anything in the statement. For an example of an inadequate statement, see S v Carter. See also S v Chetty. Generally on section 112(2), see S v Nixon. In terms of section 112(3), evidence, etc., may still be led on sentence.

If, at any stage before sentencing, there is doubt that the accused is guilty, or if it appears that the accused does not admit, or has not admitted, any allegation in the charge, or that the accused may have a valid defence, or for any other reason, the court may enter a plea of not guilty. The trial then continues on that basis. Any admitted allegation which is not in question will stand. For more, see Attorney-General, Transvaal v Botha, S v Nixon and S v H

There is no onus on the accused when he seeks to alter a plea of guilty to one of not guilty at the trial stage. This is different if change of plea is first sought on appeal, in which case the onus is on the accused to satisfy the court.

== Plea of not guilty ==
When the accused enters a plea of not guilty at summary trial, the presiding officer may ask the accused if he wishes to make a statement indicating the basis of his defence. If the accused does not make such a statement, or if it is unclear from his statement what is in dispute between him and the state, the court may question the accused to establish what is in dispute.

The court may in its discretion put any question to the accused to obtain clarity. The court shall ask accused whether any allegation not in issue may be recorded as an admission in terms of section 220 (which provides that formal admissions by the accused relieve the State of the burden of proving such facts). If the accused consents, this is recorded as a formal admission.

If the accused's legal adviser replies to any question by the court, the court will require the accused to provide confirmation.

It is a rule of practice that the court informs the accused of his right not to make a statement or answer questions.

The question has arisen, in terms of section 35(3)(h) of the Constitution, of whether or not section 115 is constitutional.

It is improper for the court to cross-examine the accused during questioning. It is a rule of practice that the court informs the accused of the effect of formal admissions.

At the end of the state's case, the court should inform an undefended accused that a plea explanation is no substitute for evidence under oath. All warnings, explanations, etc., should be properly recorded. The effect of a formal admission is to relieve the state of the necessity of proving the fact or facts in question. Such formal admissions are only of facts unfavourable to the accused.

If the accused does not consent to the recording of uncontested allegations, this will be material for cross-examination by the state. Such admissions may also have some weight in favour of the state at the end of the case. The court may have regard to both the incriminatory and the exculpatory parts of the plea explanation, as the court held in S v Cloete. In R v Valachia, it was held that the court will usually be inclined to pay attention more to the incriminatory parts than to the exculpatory ones.

== After plea ==
The general rule is that an accused who has pleaded is entitled to a verdict. This does not mean that the accused is entitled to a verdict immediately; it means only that proceedings may not be concluded without reaching a verdict. This contrasts with the situation where the accused has not pleaded: Here the case could, for example, be withdrawn, and the accused would not be entitled to a verdict. An exception is mentioned in section 106(4), where there is a plea that the court has no jurisdiction to try the offence.

The following are also exceptions:

- where the presiding officer recuses himself;
- where it is impossible for the judicial officer to continue with the trial;
- where the accused is declared a state patient;
- where there is a conversion of the trial into an enquiry;
- where there are plea proceedings under Chapter 19 and 19A of the Criminal Procedure Act, 1977 (preliminary pleas in one court with a view to trial in another); and
- when separation of trials is ordered.

=== Separation of trials ===
An accused may be joined with any other accused in the same criminal proceedings at any time before any evidence has been led in respect of the charge in question.

In terms of section 157(2), the state or the accused may apply for separation. The court has a discretion whether to grant this application. As a general rule, it is preferable that alleged joint offenders be tried together.

The test of whether or not to grant separation centres once more on the question of prejudice—but it is a question of whether prejudice is likely, not merely whether it is possible. For an example of the application of the principle, see S v Groesbeek.

When some accused pleads guilty to one or more charges, and others plead not guilty, the practice is to grant separation. Failure to separate in such circumstances is not necessarily or automatically prejudicial, however.

The court may abstain from giving judgment against any accused whose trial is separated.

== Contested trial ==
Proceedings usually take place in open court, unless one of the exceptional situations provided for in section 153 is present.

The prosecutor may make an opening address. In practice this occurs only in complicated or serious cases. The purpose of the opening address is to allow the state to explain what the case is about and how it intends to prove it. This will also help the court and the defence to follow the evidence.

The prosecutor then leads the evidence of the state witnesses in the order of his choice. (This is because the prosecutor is dominus litis.) If certain documents are admissible as evidence on mere production—that is, without having a witness hand them in and explain them—the prosecutor will read them out. Documents of this type are catered for specifically in certain provisions.

The prosecutor is not obliged to lead all available evidence, but he must make available to the defence those witnesses whom he does not call. The prosecutor is under a duty to make favourable information available to the defence.

The defence may cross-examine each state witness after evidence in chief. Where there are multiple accused, each may cross-examine. The purpose of cross-examination is

- to test the accuracy of the evidence; and
- to elicit material favourable to the defence.

The duty of the cross-examiner is to put his case to a witness. For the application of this principle to the prosecutor as well, see S v Manicum Although, in S v Fortuin, the court is generally conceded to have arrived at the correct conclusion, it confused the effect of not cross-examining.

Failure to allow a cross-examination may amount to a fatal irregularity.

After cross-examination, the prosecutor may re-examine the witness.

At end of the state case, before the defence case, the court may discharge the accused. The test is whether or not there is now any evidence before court on which a reasonable court could (not should) convict the accused. In S v Legote, it was held that the court has a duty to discharge an unrepresented accused ex mero motu if the evidence against him is too flimsy.

Credibility is not usually an issue at this stage. The state's evidence is taken at face value. Credibility may occasionally be considered if the court is of the opinion that the state evidence is such that no reasonable court could convict on it.

On the question of whether or not a court may exercise its discretion not to discharge if, although there is no state evidence to incriminate the accused, the possibility exists that incriminating evidence may emerge during the defence case, see S v Shuping and S v Lubaxa. There are two contingencies in this regard:

1. the possibility of incriminating evidence from the accused himself; and
2. the possibility of incriminating evidence from the co-accused.

Lubaxa holds that, today, only the second contingency is a sound basis for refusing discharge. If the court decides to refuse on the first ground, however, it must have reason to believe that the co-accused might in fact incriminate the accused applying for discharge.

If there is no discharge at end of the state case, the defence presents its case. It may deliver an opening address, if it desires, and then call the accused and any witnesses it chooses. The state cross-examines these witnesses, and the defence may re-examine them. The accused is usually obliged to testify before defence witnesses.

Explanations must be given to an undefended accused. He must be informed carefully of all the rights which affect the conduct of his case: for example,

- the effect of the earlier plea explanation, in particular the fact that it is not equivalent to evidence;
- any reverse onus placed on him; and
- competent verdicts on the charge.

The defence may elect to close its case without calling the accused or any witnesses. If it does so, the court may come to the conclusion that the prima facie state evidence may be accepted as proof beyond reasonable doubt.

The effect of false testimony by the accused is usually equivalent to his giving no evidence.

The court may itself call witnesses where this is necessary for a just decision of the case. The judge is not merely a passive umpire; he is an administrator of justice.

The court's power to deal with recalcitrant witnesses is regulated in section 189 of the Criminal Procedure Act, 1977.

The impeachment of witnesses is dealt with in section 190. For the meaning of "hostile witness," and the effect of a declaration of witness as hostile, see, for example, Meyers Trustee v Malan and City Panel Beaters v Bana.

Impeachment of the credit of one's own witness is dealt with in section 190(2), and in R v Loofer and S v Muhiaba. Proof of a previous inconsistent statement does not make that statement evidence against the accused. Other points of the witness's evidence not covered by the deviation may still be accepted by the court. The fact that a witness has lied on one point does not prevent the court from accepting his evidence on another point.

== Sentence ==
The main purposes of sentencing are retribution, deterrence, prevention and rehabilitation. In some ways, sentencing is the most important part of the trial. Until fairly recently, insufficient attention was given to this stage of proceedings.

A court may, before passing sentence, receive such evidence as it thinks fit to inform itself as to the proper sentence to be passed. The accused may address the court on any evidence thus received, as well as on the actual matter of the sentence; after him, the prosecution may likewise address the court.

Disputed issues on sentence should be advanced under oath, but uncontested facts may be advanced from the bar without evidence.

It is undesirable that contentious facts be placed before the court by a third-party witness who does not have personal knowledge of such facts.

It is important that the accused or his legal representative advance facts and submissions in mitigation of sentence: for example,

- youth;
- a clean record;
- old age;
- economic circumstances, etc.

Conversely, the state should bring before the court any factors which may aggravate sentence: for example,

- evidence about the trauma of the victim;
- the prevalence of the crime in question; and
- its effect, either in general or in this specific case, on the community or environment, etc.

In considering sentence, the court should have regard to the famous Zinn triad:

1. the crime;
2. the criminal; and
3. interests of society.

Where the accused is the primary caregiver of young children, additional considerations apply, but see S v Isaacs, where it was suggested that court should have more regard to the interests of the victim.

=== Types of sentence ===
The types of sentence, under section 276 of Criminal Procedure Act, 1977, are as follows:

- imprisonment;
- periodical imprisonment;
- declaration as a habitual criminal;
- committal to an institution;
- a fine;
- correctional supervision; and
- imprisonment from which the Commissioner of Correctional Services may place the prisoner under correctional supervision.

Dangerous criminals may be sentenced to imprisonment for an indefinite period. A fine should generally be affordable to the accused, even though he may have to sell some of his assets to pay it. Fines are usually imposed with the alternative of imprisonment. Juveniles (those under eighteen years of age) may be given special sentences.

=== Cumulative or concurrent sentences ===
Sentences run consecutively unless the court orders otherwise. Courts should always have regard to the cumulative effect of sentences. For a spectacular example of the difference made by causing sentences to run concurrently, see S v Assante.

=== Postponement and suspension of sentences ===
Postponement of the passing of a sentence, or suspension of a sentence, usually on conditions (such as good conduct, compensation, correctional supervision, instruction or treatment, or any other condition the court thinks appropriate), is permitted in terms of section 297(1). The maximum period of postponement or suspension is five years.

Sentences are usually only postponed in the less serious cases, or where special circumstances prevail: for example, where the age of the offender is an important factor.

Suspended sentences are imposed frequently, either in whole or in part. It is important that the conditions

- be carefully worded;
- have some bearing on the offence convicted;
- be within the control of the accused;
- be reasonable; and
- comply with constitutional values.

Where only part of a sentence of imprisonment is suspended, the period of suspension starts running from the date of release from prison, not from the date of imposition. For the difficulties that this interpretation may cause, see S v Mbombo.

=== Minimum sentences ===
Minimum-sentence provisions, in terms of section 51 of the Criminal Law Amendment Act, 1997 are very important for the sentencing process at present. The provisions were originally introduced as an emergency measure, renewable by the President every two years. They have now been made a permanent feature of the sentencing process. They provide for very severe punishments of various types of serious crime.

The provisions provide for certain minimum sentences in respect of various categories of serious offences set out in the schedules to the Act. In certain instances these minimum sentences are life sentences: for example,

- for planned or premeditated murder;
- for murder committed during rape or robbery with aggravating circumstances;
- for rape by multiple persons; and
- for rape committed by a person who knows that he is HIV-positive.

In certain other cases, the minimums are lengthy periods of imprisonment.

If the sentencing court finds that "substantial and compelling circumstances" are present, it may impose a lesser sentence. As to what constitutes a "substantial and compelling circumstance," and how courts should approach the issue, see S v Malgas.

The Constitutional Court has ruled that the provisions of section 51(1) of the Criminal Law Amendment Act are not unconstitutional. Section 51(1) provides for High Courts and regional courts to impose a minimum life sentence for certain crimes. It seems to follow that section 51(2), which provides for certain lengthy periods of imprisonment by High Courts and regional courts for slightly less serious crimes than in subsection (1), will also survive constitutional challenge.

=== Compensation orders ===
In terms of section 300 of the Criminal Procedure Act, 1977, where the court convicts an accused of an offence involving damage to or loss of property belonging to another, the court

- may,
- upon application of the injured party, or the prosecutor acting on such party's instructions,

award compensation to the injured party. The court may hear further evidence to establish civil liability or the amount of compensation.

The maximum amounts which regional courts and magistrate's courts may award are laid down from time to time by the Minister of Justice. These awards have the effect of civil judgments. The person in whose favour an award is made may within sixty days renounce it. If he does not, that person will be precluded from proceeding civilly in connection with the same injury.

An award under section 300 is usually inappropriate if the accused is sentenced to a lengthy period of imprisonment and has no assets.

== Criminal appeals from lower courts ==
The accused has a right to appeal to the High Court against any conviction or sentence or order of a lower court. In 1997, provisions were introduced to require an accused who intended to appeal from a lower court to obtain leave to do so from that court, or (if such leave should be refused) from the High Court by way of petition. This process of leave to appeal involved an assessment of whether or not the prospects were reasonable that the High Court would come to a conclusion different from that of the trial court.

The Constitutional Court, in S v Steyn, has declared these new provisions to be unconstitutional. The court's six-month moratorium has expired; accordingly sections 309B and 309C, in their original form, have fallen away.

At the beginning of 2004, however, new legislation, the Criminal Procedure Amendment Act, 2003, was introduced. It requires leave to appeal in certain circumstances from lower-court convictions, sentences and orders. The most significant features of this legislation are the following:

- Leave to appeal is again required, except where
  - the accused
    - is younger than 16
    - is 16 or older but under 18 and sentenced to any form of imprisonment that was not wholly suspended
    - has received a prescribed minimum sentence of life imprisonment by a regional court (applying S51(1) of the Criminal Law Amendment Act).
- Appeals are decided in chambers on the basis of written argument, unless the judges decide that oral argument is desirable in the interests of justice. This part, however, was struck down as unconstitutional in Shinga v The State.
- If leave to appeal is refused by the lower court's presiding officer, the accused may petition the Judge President of the relevant High Court.

In Shinga, the Constitutional Court held that the requirement of leave to appeal from the lower courts, as set out in the Criminal Procedure Amendment Act, was constitutional.

Appeals and applications for leave to appeal must be noted and followed up within the times and other requirements of the legislation and the rules of court.

The noting of an appeal does not automatically suspend the execution of a sentence, unless the court decides to release the accused on bail.

Applications for leave to appeal must be written, setting out the basis for the appeal. If the application is made immediately after sentence, however, it is made orally, in court, and is taken down as part of the court record. In the case of appeals where no leave is required, there must be a written notice of appeal, which shall set out clearly and specifically the grounds of fact or law on which the appeal is based.

After receipt of the notice, the magistrate or regional magistrate may give further reasons for his findings. The clerk of court prepares the record and forwards it to the High Court. Ultimate responsibility for ensuring that all copies of the record are properly before the High Court lies with the accused (now the appellant) or his attorney.

Rule 67 allows fifteen days for noting an appeal. This may be extended on good cause shown, or condonation. The general principle of condonation is that there must be a reasonable explanation for the delay, and reasonable prospects of success on appeal.

Prior to the hearing of the appeal, both parties must submit heads of argument. Appeals are heard by at least two judges, but more may be assigned if the Judge President so chooses.

=== Powers of court on appeal ===
The powers of the court on appeal are the same as on automatic review:

- to confirm, alter or quash the conviction, and (where appropriate) to substitute the conviction on an alternative charge;
- to confirm, reduce, alter or set aside the sentence or other order;
- to set aside or correct the proceedings;
- to give such judgment, or impose such sentence, or give such order, as the magistrate ought to have given, etc.;
- to remit the case to the magistrate with instructions to deal with any matter as the High Court may think fit;
- to make any order suspending the execution of the sentence, or releasing the accused on bail, that seems appropriate.

In addition to powers of automatic review, the court of appeal may also increase the sentence. For an example of the approach of the appeal courts to an increase of sentence, see S v Salzwedel.

Where the state or a court of appeal considers an increase in sentence, the practice is for notice to be given to the appellant.

In general, for the approach of appeal court to

- conviction, see R v Dhlumayo; and
- sentence, see S v Anderson, S v Giannoulis, Malgas and S v Jiminez. If there was no material misdirection by the trial court, the court of appeal will only interfere with the sentence if there is a striking disparity between what the trial court imposed and what the appeal court would have imposed. If there was a material misdirection, the appeal court is "at large" and imposes the sentence it deems fit. The same test applies, whether the original sentence is claimed to have been too severe or too lenient.

Where a conviction or a sentence is set aside on appeal or review, because section 112 or 113 have not been applied or have not been properly applied, the appeal court must remit to the lower court for proper compliance with section 112 or 113.

Where conviction and sentence are set aside on appeal on grounds of technical irregularity, the accused may be retried.

If an appeal is dismissed, and if he obtains the necessary leave, the accused may appeal further to the SCA. The Provincial or Local Division gives leave to appeal: If leave is refused, the appellant may approach the SCA for such leave.

The state may only appeal

- on a question of law; or
- on sentence.

Special procedural rules apply to either type of state appeal.

== Review from proceedings in magistrate's court ==
=== Automatic review ===
The system of automatic review of certain cases in the magistrate's court is unique to South Africa and goes back a long way. It is intended to protect an undefended accused against unjustified convictions and sentences imposed by magistrates.

In terms of section 302, the following cases go on automatic review:

- imprisonment exceeding three months, where the magistrate has less than seven years' service as such;
- imprisonment exceeding six months, where the magistrate has at least seven years' service as such; and
- fines exceeding the amount determined by Minister from time to time (currently exceeding R6 000 for a magistrate with less than seven years' experience, and R12 000 for a magistrate with more than seven years' experience).

It is the individual sentence on each count that is taken into consideration when determining whether the sentence exceeds these limits, not the total effect of all the different sentences on each count. Ten counts of theft with a R100 fine on each count would therefore not be automatically reviewable, even though the total sentence would exceed R6000.

Even when the sentence exceeds the limit, there is no automatic review if the accused had a legal adviser.

The automatic-review process is also suspended if the accused has noted an appeal, but it revives if the appeal is abandoned and falls away if and when the appeal is disposed of.

The clerk of court prepares a record and forwards it to High Court within one week after the determination of the case. On receipt of the record, the case is considered by single judge of the High Court. If he is satisfied that proceedings are in accordance with justice, he endorses the record accordingly, whereupon the record is returned to the magistrate's court.

If the judge is not satisfied that proceedings are in accordance with justice, or if he is in doubt, he will refer case back to the magistrate for reasons. In practice, he often queries a particular point or points. On receipt of the magistrate's reasons, the judge refers the case to a court of the Provincial or Local Division of the High Court to treat as an appeal. In practice two judges then consider the case in chambers, and then confirm or alter or set aside proceedings, giving a written judgment.

If it is clear that the conviction or sentence is not in accordance with justice, and the accused would be prejudiced by a delay in getting the magistrate's reasons, the judge may skip the step of requesting such reasons.

The court of appeal, in considering a review after receipt of the magistrate's reasons (or where this step is skipped), may have the case set down for argument by the Director of Public Prosecutions and counsel.

The court may also hear any evidence, etc., although this rarely happens.

=== Powers of court on review ===
The powers of the court on review are as follows:

- to confirm, alter or quash the conviction, and where appropriate to substitute the conviction on another alternative charge;
- to confirm, reduce, alter or set aside the sentence or other order;
- to set aside or correct the proceedings;
- to give such judgment or impose such sentence, or give such order, as the magistrate's court ought to have given or imposed;
- to remit the case to the magistrate with instructions to deal with any matter as the High Court may think fit; and
- to make any order suspending the execution of sentence or releasing on bail as seems appropriate.

The review court decides the issue on the basis of real and substantial justice, not necessarily according to strict law. The review court does not have the power to increase the sentence. If the trial court has imposed an invalid sentence, however—if, for example, it has ignored a mandatory sentence—the High Court imposes a proper sentence, which may have the effect of an increase.

The review court may substitute the conviction for a more serious offence, but should give notice to the accused before doing so.

=== Special review ===
When a magistrate has imposed a sentence not automatically reviewable, or where a regional court has imposed any sentence, and it comes to the notice of the High Court or any judge that proceedings were not in accordance with justice, the judge or High Court has same powers as if it were an automatic review under s 302. This is known as a special review. In practice, judges intervene in this way after the magistrate or regional magistrate in question, or a colleague or superior, or the DPP, discovers that something is wrong and brings it to the judge's attention, or even after the judge gets information from outside: from the press, for example, or from a concerned member of the public.

Special review is not possible if there has been an acquittal. If there has been an acquittal, the only way a case can go on review is via section 24 of the Supreme Court Act, 1959.

=== Review before sentence ===
Prior to the introduction of section 304A, the common law applied, permitting no review under sections 302 to 304 until after sentencing. Now there may be a review before sentence if the magistrate or regional magistrate is of the view that an irregularity has taken place.

=== Section 307 ===
In terms of section 307, execution of sentence is not suspended by transmission of a case for review, unless the sentencing court releases the accused on bail.

=== Review in terms of section 24 of Supreme Court Act, 1959 ===
Review of proceedings in lower courts may be brought to the High Court by way of section 24 of the Supreme Court Act, 1959. Grounds for such reviews are

- the absence of jurisdiction on the part of the court;
- an interest in the cause, bias, malice or corruption on the part of the presiding judicial officer;
- a gross irregularity in the proceedings; and
- the admission of inadmissible or incompetent evidence, or the rejection of admissible or competent evidence.

The procedure for bringing such reviews before the High Court is set out in Rule 53 of the High Court Rules.

Where the accused complains of irregularities in the proceedings, these may be the subject of an appeal as well. This is especially appropriate if there is an attack on the conviction or sentence as well as a contention of irregularity.

Where the alleged irregularity is not revealed in the trial record—for example, if there is an allegation that the presiding officer was "got at" outside the court—then review in terms of section 24 of the Supreme Court Act, 1959 is the appropriate route.

There are wider grounds for interfering on automatic review than in the case of a true review under section 24 of the Supreme Court Act, 1959. Automatic review is a hybrid of pure review and appeal.

The following are some further distinctions between appeals and reviews:

- There are time limits for noting appeals, but reviews have to be brought only within a reasonable time.
- The disposal of a review does not preclude an appeal; once an appeal has been disposed of, however, there may be no review. Note, though, the different approach, in light of section 173 of the Constitution, in Hansen v Regional Magistrate, Cape Town and S v Sawman.

Section 24 of the Supreme Court Act, 1959 also makes provision for review of other tribunals, etc. Such reviews are more properly within the scope of administrative law.

== Prosecution of crime ==
In South Africa, the primary authority and responsibility for the prosecution of crime lies with the State. This is in contrast to the position in some other countries: the United Kingdom, for example, where there are many private prosecutions and police prosecutions.

From this it follows that, in South Africa, a complainant or victim, or grieving relatives, do not generally have the power to force a State prosecution, or to prevent the State from prosecuting. Nor does the decision lie with the police or politicians, nor with the public at large. The views of these people do have some relevance, as they may create pressure to prosecute, but the final decision lies not with them, but with the prosecuting authority.

In S v Zuma, the accused stood trial on one count of rape. During the course of the trial, application was made on behalf of three entities for an order admitting them, as amici curiae. The court held that none of the three could contribute to any fact relevant to the incident. In addition, the application was opposed by both the State and the defence; it appeared that the complainant herself was not in favour of the application. The court held that it was not apparent from the founding and supporting affidavits how the applicants could assist the court in matters that were to be decided on a factual basis, as the State had already tendered evidence on all the aspects that the applicants now wished to raise in their evidence and submissions. The court held that the public may not drive the system as part of the process; the public may only lobby or apply pressure in a similar way. The public at large is not entitled to assume the status required to be formally involved in the process.

Among the implications of the above is that

- the victim of a crime cannot force prosecution by the State;
- the victim of a crime cannot prevent prosecution by the State; and
- the victim of a crime (or an outside party or amicus curiae) is not entitled to intervene in the prosecution.

In NDPP v Zuma, the court held that the Attorney-General is required by convention to make prosecutorial decisions without regard to political considerations, and may not subject his discretionary authority to that of government. He is also not responsible to government to justify the exercise of his discretion, because this political office has judicial attributes. The NPAA requires members of the prosecuting authority to serve impartially, and to exercise, carry out or perform their powers, duties and functions in good faith and without fear, favour or prejudice, subject only to the Constitution and the law. It further provides that no-one may interfere improperly with the National Prosecuting Authority in the performance of its duties and functions.

=== Private prosecution ===
The general position, then, is that the complainant does not have the power to force a State prosecution. To this generalisation, there are two main exceptions, provided for by the Criminal Procedure Act, 1977, although they are only allowed in very strict circumstances:

- prosecution by a private individual; and
- private prosecution by a person or statutory body upon whom or upon which the power to prosecute is expressly conferred by statute.

==== By a private individual ====
The two requirements for prosecution by a private individual, under section 7 of the Criminal Procedure Act, 1977, are as follows:

1. The DPP must have declined to prosecute at the public instance; and
2. the individual seeking to prosecute (who must be a private person, not a corporate body) must prove some substantial and peculiar interest in the issue, arising out of some injury personally suffered.

It ought to be noted that certain categories of persons have the right to institute prosecution on behalf of others to whom they stand in a special relationship:

- a husband, if the offence was committed in respect of his wife;
- the wife or child, or (if there is no wife or child) any of the next of kin of any deceased person, if that person's death is alleged to have been caused by the offence in question; and
- the legal guardian or curator of a minor or "lunatic," if the offence was committed against the latter.

These extensions are worded archaically. There is no extension of the right to a wife if the offence was committed in respect of her husband; the reference to "lunatics" has now been altered to refer to the "mentally ill."

===== Nolle prosequi certificate =====
One prerequisite for a private prosecution is a certificate nolle prosequi, issued by the DPP. With this the DPP certifies that he has seen the statements or affidavits on which the charge is based, and declines to prosecute at the public instance. The DPP is obliged to produce such a certificate when he has declined to prosecute, and the person intending to prosecute instead has requested such a certificate.

One school of thought has is that the DPP is obliged to issue this certificate because it is not for him to go into the merits of whether the particular private person has the capacity to bring private prosecution. The case of Singh v Minister of Justice, however, shows the other side of the coin. The applicant in that case had been expelled from his post in the Directorate of Special Operations, and subsequently had been prosecuted for defeating the ends of justice on various counts arising from alleged offences committed in the course of his duties as an investigator. This prosecution failed, as the trial court granted a permanent stay of prosecution on the grounds that the evidence against the applicant had been obtained illegally.

After this, Singh laid criminal charges against various persons who had instigated his prosecution. The NDPP decided not to prosecute, and informed the applicant accordingly, leaving the court to deal with the question of whether or not Singh was entitled to a certificate nolle prosequi. The court held that Singh did not fit the requirements for private prosecution, so the DPP was not obliged to issue the certificate. There had been no averment in Singh's affidavit that he had complied with the requirements of section 7(1); the affidavit was incomplete, as none of the annexures referred to therein had been attached. The court, therefore, could not assess the veracity of the allegations, whether Singh had a substantial and peculiar interest, and whether such interest arose out of some personal injury. Therefore, the court held that Singh had failed to discharge the onus of proving that he was a private person falling within the ambit of section 7(1).

The court held further that the unrestricted meaning of a "private person" contended for by Singh was inconsistent with the recognition that private prosecutions were unusual; it was also a departure from the basic law that criminal prosecutions must be conducted by a public prosecutor. Accordingly, the NDPP had not been obliged, simply by the provisions of section 7(2), to issue a certificate nolle prosequi once he had declined to prosecute.

The nolle prosequi certificate will lapse if private prosecution is not instituted within three months. The intention here is likely to protect the possible accused from having the certificate waved over his or her head indefinitely.

===== Procedural issues =====
The private prosecutor must provide security for the costs of the private prosecution. This money must be deposited with the magistrate's court in whose area of jurisdiction the offence was committed. The amount comprises

- an amount determined by the Minister (R1,500 in terms of the Government Gazette of 14 February 2003) as security that he will prosecute the charge to a conclusion without undue delay; and
- an amount such court may determine as security for the costs which may be incurred in respect of the accused's defence to the charge.

Private prosecutions are to be instituted in the name of the private prosecutor, not in the name of the State. This means that all process in connection therewith is also issued in his name. The indictment, the charge-sheet or the summons must reflect the private prosecutor's name and bear his signature (or that of his legal representative). Two or more persons shall not prosecute the same charge except where two or more persons have been injured by the same offence.

The accused may be brought before a lower court by summons only, and before a High Court by way of indictment only. In other words, the accused may not be arrested as means of ensuring his court attendance. (The accused may, however, be put under arrest in respect of an offence in respect of which a right of private prosecution is vested in any body or person under section 8.)

If the accused pleads guilty to the charge after prosecution is instituted in terms of section 7, the State is obliged to take over the prosecution. The usual grounds for having refused to prosecute in the first place is a lack of evidence; if, however, the accused has pleaded guilty, there is obviously some merit in the allegation. The State only becomes involved, though, once the court is satisfied that the plea of guilty is appropriate and genuine. The DPP may at any stage apply to the court to stop all further proceedings so that prosecution may be instituted or continued at the instance of the State.

The court may award costs to a successful private prosecutor, or against an unsuccessful private prosecutor.

==== In terms of section 8 ====
Certain provincial ordinances give the right of prosecution for certain offences to municipalities and the like; other legislation may give similar rights to other bodies or persons. This right may be exercised only after the DPP has withdrawn his or her right to prosecute in respect of offences or classes of offences which are covered by the statutory right to prosecute privately under this section.

No certificate nolle prosequi as such is required.

The prosecution is instituted in the name of the prosecuting body: Makana Municipality v Smuts, for example.

Section 426 of the Companies Act, 1973 includes a special provision relating to private prosecutions for certain offences under that legislation. Section 23(5) of the Extension of Security of Tenure Act, 1997 provides another example of special provisions relating to private prosecutions.

=== Structure of State prosecuting authority ===
There is a single national prosecuting authority. The structure of the prosecuting authority is set out in detail in the NPA Act. The National Director of Public Prosecutions (NDPP) is at its head. Under the NDPP, there are several Deputy NDPPs. Each area of High Court jurisdiction is headed by a Director of Public Prosecutions (DPP), who replace what was previously known an Attorney General, who are under the overall control of the NDPP.

NDPP sets the policy framework of the NPA. The NDPP, Deputy NDPPs and DPPs are appointed by the President of the Republic. The Minister appoints Deputy DPPs to assist DPPs with their work. Deputy DPPs have, subject to control of their DPPs, the same powers as DPPs.

The NDPP appoints prosecutors. Prosecutors do the hands-on work under control of DPPs. Each magistrate's court has one or more prosecutors, depending on its size. The biggest, Johannesburg, has well over 100. Prosecutors do prosecutions in the district magistrate's courts and in magistrate court of the Regional Division.

DPPs also have a number of prosecutors on their own staff, known as state advocates. They perform High Court prosecutions, appeal from lower courts, and also spend much time assisting with the decision process in cases referred to the DPP for decision. They also handle representations from the public. Most decisions on criminal cases are taken by prosecutors in the lower courts, who lead extremely busy lives. In the more serious or difficult cases, in terms of standing instructions, prosecutors refer their decisions to their area DPPs.

Before any prosecutor can act as such, he must have written authority to prosecute from his DPP. All prosecutors have to take an oath of office before acting as such.

Issues such as the role and position of the prosecuting authority are very topical, especially in the light of recent cases involving President Jacob Zuma.

==== Ethics ====
All prosecutors are under a heavy ethical burden. They are sometimes referred to as "ministers of truth," since they are not there to secure a conviction at any cost; they must instead take into account the broader public interest and the interests of fairness in their quest to protect the truth.

In R v Stinchcombe, Stinchcombe was a lawyer charged with breach of trust, theft and fraud. A former secretary of his was a Crown witness at the preliminary inquiry, where she gave evidence apparently favourable to the defence. After the preliminary inquiry, but prior to trial, the witness was interviewed by an RCMP officer and a tape-recorded statement taken. Later, during the course of the trial, the witness was again interviewed by a police officer; a written statement was taken. Stinchcombe was informed of the existence, but not of the content, of the statements. His requests for disclosure were refused. During the trial, he learned that the witness would not be called by the Crown, and sought an order that the witness be called, or that the Crown disclose the contents of the statements to the defence. The trial judge dismissed the application, the trial proceeded, and Stinchcombe was convicted of breach of trust and fraud. Conditional stays were entered with respect to the theft counts

Stinchcombe appealed. The appellate court held that the Crown has a legal duty to disclose all relevant information to the defence. The fruits of the investigation, in its possession, are not the property of the Crown, for use in securing a conviction; they are the property of the public, to be used to ensure that justice is done. The obligation to disclose is subject to a discretion with respect to the withholding of information, and to the timing and manner of disclosure. Crown counsel had a duty to respect the rules of privilege and to protect the identity of informers; a discretion must also be exercised with respect to the relevance of information. The Crown's discretion was reviewable by the trial judge, who should be guided by the general principle that information should not be withheld if there is a reasonable possibility that it will impair the right of the accused to make full answer and defence. The absolute withholding of information which is relevant to the defence can only be justified on the basis of the existence of a legal privilege which excludes the information from disclosure. This privilege is reviewable, however, on the ground that it is not a reasonable limit on the right to make full answer and defence in a particular case.

The court held that all statements obtained from persons who have provided relevant information to the authorities, even if they are not proposed as Crown witnesses, should be produced. The court accordingly found that Crown counsel was not justified in refusing disclosure on the ground that the witness was not worthy of credit: Whether the witness is credible is for the trial judge to determine after hearing the evidence. The trial judge ought to have examined the statements. Since the information withheld might have affected the outcome of the trial, the failure to disclose impaired the right to make full answer and defence. The court held, therefore, that there should be a new trial, at which the statements were to be produced.

In Shabalala v Attorney-General, Transvaal, the applicants had been indicted to stand trial in a Provincial Division on a charge of murder. Before the trial, various applications were made to the trial court on behalf of the applicants, including an application that they be given copies of the relevant police dockets. The court refused the applications, holding that the applicants had not satisfied it that the documents were "required" by them, within the meaning of section 23 of the Constitution, "for the exercise of any of their rights to a fair trial." It was held that what a fair trial might require depends on the circumstances of each particular case; it is for the trial court to exercise a proper discretion in this regard. The court held that an accused is ordinarily entitled to have access to those documents in the police docket which are exculpatory (or which are prima facie likely to be helpful to the defence)—unless, in very rare cases, the State is able to justify the refusal of such access on the grounds that it is not justified for the purposes of a fair trial. Ordinarily the right to a fair trial would include access to the statements of witnesses (whether or not the State intended calling such witnesses) and such of the contents of the docket as are relevant in order to enable an accused person properly to exercise that right. The prosecution might, however, in a particular case, be able to justify the denial of such access on the grounds that it was not justified for the purposes of a fair trial. This would depend on the circumstances of each case.

The court noted that the State is entitled to resist a claim by the accused for access to any particular document in the police docket

- on the ground that such access was not justified for the purposes of enabling the accused properly to exercise his or her right to a fair trial;
- on the ground that it had reason to believe that there was a reasonable risk that access to the relevant document would lead to the disclosure of the identity of an informer, or disclosure of State secrets; or
- on the ground that there was a reasonable risk that such disclosure might lead to the intimidation of witnesses or otherwise prejudice the proper ends of justice. In this regard, the court has a discretion.

The appellant in S v Yengeni was initially charged with corruption and fraud. After plea negotiations with the State, he pleaded guilty to and was convicted of an alternative charge of fraud. Accordingly he was sentenced to four years' imprisonment. Yengeni filed a review application against sentence on the basis that the NDPP and Minister of Justice had agreed to see to it that he would be sentenced to no more than a fine of R5,000 if he pleaded guilty to fraud. The court held that, even if an agreement had been concluded as alleged, it would have been fundamentally incapable of being performed, as any attempt to fetter the court's discretion on sentence would be in conflict with the fundamental constitutional principle of the independence of the judiciary. It would also blur the clear distinction between a prosecutorial decision, which was part of the executive's competence, and the sentencing power, which was a judicial power. The court expressed disgust at the possibility that such an agreement could have been concluded, as the NDPP ought to be impartial and not politically motivated. The court noted that the purported agreement was to be distinguished from a plea-bargaining agreement, since the latter was expressly subject to the court's finding that the agreement was just, which decision was made by the court independently of the parties to the agreement. The review application was therefore dismissed.

Phato v Attorney-General, Eastern Cape dealt with two applications, combined for the purposes of the judgment. The issue was the right of an accused to access to the police docket relating to the accused's impending trial in a magistrate's court on a charge under the Witchcraft Suppression Act, 1957. In the first application, the applicant was the accused, who contended that he was entitled to this information by virtue of the provisions of sections 23 and 25(3) of the Constitution. In the second application, the applicant was the Commissioner of the SAPS, who desired an order declaring that the privilege which existed in respect of the contents of police dockets immediately prior to the commencement of the Constitution was not repealed or amended by section 23, but that the accused was entitled before trial only to copies of

- all medical, hospital and autopsy reports;
- summaries of other expert evidence to be tendered by the State; and
- copies of all documents relating to identification parades.

The Commissioner argued that the State was only required to furnish an accused with such information as he required, in the narrow sense, to exercise his right to a fair trial: that is to say, a trial in an adversarial system of litigation which recognises various privileges from disclosure of information to the other side as being paramount to its proper operation. This included the docket privilege.

The Court held that the practices of the past, whereby the State retained tight control of almost all available information relevant to a criminal prosecution, was inconsistent with modern values of openness and accountability in a democratically oriented administration. The court held that section 23 gave an accused the right to access to the information contained in the police docket for the exercise and protection of his right to a fair criminal trial.

The Commissioner argued that Stinchcombe permitted non-disclosure of witness statements on grounds of privilege, and that this privilege included the docket privilege in South African law. The court held that, whereas in Canada the State had a discretion to withhold information which would ordinarily be disclosed, the South African Constitution's inclusion of section 23 means there is a protected right to information. The court therefore ordered that the respondents furnish the applicant with witness statements, and with all exhibits, plans and diagrams in the police docket, if any, and that they also give the applicant access to the remaining information in the docket.

==== Opening a docket ====
Prosecutors usually make their decisions on evidence gathered by the police; in exceptional cases, by special investigative agencies. When a crime is reported to the police, a police docket is opened. The fruits of the investigation are all contained in the docket, in the form of

- witness statements, usually under oath;
- documentary evidence (the cheque in a fraud case, for example);
- warning statements of the accused;
- a list of the accused's previous convictions;
- correspondence in connection with the investigation; and
- an investigation diary.

Prosecutors often ask the police to do further investigation along certain lines: for example, to investigate further a possible defence revealed in an accused's warning statement. Prosecutors take their decisions on the strength of what is in the docket. If a case goes to trial, prosecutors are not obliged to lead all the evidence in the docket. The amount of evidence led depends on the circumstances. The evidence of ten different witnesses need not be led if the evidence of one will suffice because it is not contradicted. The prosecutor, however, is still obliged to disclose all evidence to the accused.

In R v Heilbron, the licensee of Empire Bar, Heilbron, was charged with two counts of contravention of a Liquor Ordinance, for permitting drunkenness and for permitting his place to be the habitual resort or place of meeting of reputed prostitutes. He was acquitted on the first count and convicted on the second. He brought an appeal on several grounds, but the most important for present purposes is his contention that certain persons whose names were mentioned in the evidence as prostitutes who resorted to this place were not called as witnesses. The court held that there was very strong evidence against Heilbron, and that, where there is a crucial witness, the Crown should either call him or render him available: What is "crucial" depends on the circumstances of the case. The prostitutes who were not called, the court found, were not crucial witnesses. Furthermore, it was not shown how Heilbron was prejudiced by their not being called; it was open to Heilbron, who had all these names before him, to call the witnesses himself. His appeal, therefore, was dismissed.

=== Withdrawal or stopping of prosecution ===
Before the plea, the prosecutors may withdraw a case, in which event

- the accused is not entitled to a verdict; and
- prosecution may subsequently be re-instituted.

After the plea, however, the case may no longer be withdrawn. The prosecution may be stopped after the plea, however, provided that the prosecutor has the necessary authority from the DPP. In this event,

- the accused is entitled to an acquittal; and
- prosecution may not be re-instituted against the accused in the future.

In S v Magayela, the prosecutor had closed the State's case without calling a crucial witness. The accused was thereupon discharged. The matter was referred to the High Court, at the request of the complainant, for review of the acquittal. The State contended that the prosecutor had not been authorised to stop the prosecution, and that the decision to close the State's case had amounted to a stopping of the prosecution; the acquittal ought therefore to be set aside and the case referred back to the court a quo to complete the trial.

The court held that the accused had not been discharged because of the prosecutor's action when the matter had still been in his hands; the prosecutor had no intention of stopping the prosecution. Furthermore, even if he had known that closing the State case would inevitably lead to discharge, that was the route he had followed. The magistrate had discharged the accused not because he had no control over the matter, but because he had made a finding that on the evidence there was no case against the accused. He had not been bound by any stopping of the prosecution by the prosecutor. Even if the prosecutor would in both cases (stopping the prosecution or closing the State case) have been moved by the same considerations, there was a clear distinction in principle between the two procedures and their consequences. Accordingly, the court held that the acquittal could not be set aside.

In S v Gouws, after the accused had pleaded not guilty to a charge of defeating the ends of justice, the prosecutor closed the State's case without calling any witnesses. In the prosecutor's opinion, the accused had pleaded to the wrong charge. The magistrate found the accused not guilty and discharged him. The matter was referred to the High Court on special review, on the basis that the prosecutor's actions amounted to a stopping of the prosecution, and that, in terms of section 6(b) of the Criminal Procedure Act, 1977, this could be done only with the consent of the DPP.

Among the questions that fell to be determined was whether there was any duty on the court to enquire, under such circumstances, whether the prosecutor was indeed stopping the prosecution and, if so, whether he or she had the necessary consent to do so.

The court held that the mere acceptance of a plea could not amount to a stoppage of the prosecution in the manner contemplated in section 6(b) of the Criminal Procedure Act, 1977. A prosecutor who accepted a plea was doing no more than taking a day-to-day decision which all prosecutors were called upon to take in the course of their duties. Furthermore, there was no duty on a court to enquire into whether or not a prosecutor who accepted an accused person's plea, or who decided not to call witnesses, or further witnesses, was thereby stopping the proceedings. All that a prosecutor was doing under such circumstances was leaving before the court whatever had been placed before it up to that stage: It was then up to the court to make a decision.

The court noted that it would cause an accused person great concern to hear a magistrate questioning whether or not it was appropriate for the State to call no further evidence. He might understandably believe that the court wanted him or her to be convicted.

The court held that a successful application by the State for the setting aside of an acquittal, based on the grounds that the prosecutor had failed to obtain the necessary approval before stopping the proceedings, would be tantamount to giving the State "a second bite at the cherry." The judgment of the court a quo, the verdict of "not guilty," was therefore confirmed.

=== Prosecution within reasonable time, and prescription ===
The accused is entitled to be prosecuted within a reasonable time. There are three main provisions dealing with the issue of prescription in this context:

1. section 18 of the Criminal Procedure Act, 1977;
2. section 35(3)(d) of the Constitution; and
3. section 342A of the Criminal Procedure Act, 1977.

==== Criminal Procedure Act, 1977 s 18 ====
All crimes, with certain exceptions for the most serious of crimes, prescribe after 20 years. Prosecution after this period may no longer be instituted. The exceptions are for

- murder;
- treason during a time of war;
- robbery with aggravating circumstances;
- kidnapping;
- child-stealing;
- rape or compelled rape;
- the crime of genocide, crimes against humanity and war crimes;
- trafficking in persons for sexual purposes;
- using a child or person who is mentally disabled for pornographic purposes.

These exceptions evolved from the Roman-Dutch law. The case of S v De Freitas sets out their history. In the Cape, murder was excluded in 1828; this position was perpetuated throughout the Republic until 1971, when the new CPA, instead of excluding specific offences from the operation of prescription, provided that prescription would not bar prosecution for offences "in respect of which the sentence of death may be imposed." At the time, the death sentence was competent for the offences of murder, treason, kidnapping, child-stealing, rape, robbery or attempted robbery with aggravating circumstances, and housebreaking with aggravating circumstances. In addition there were the provisions of terrorist and sabotage legislation, which empowered the court to impose the same sentence as that for treason.

In 1982, the Internal Security Act, 1982 abolished these provisions, but introduced the death sentence as a competent sentence for the offence of "terrorism" as defined in the Act. In 1990 housebreaking was removed from the list.

In 1995, the Constitutional Court held, in S v Makwanyane, that the Constitution had abolished the death sentence in respect of the crimes of murder, robbery or attempted robbery, kidnapping, child-stealing and rape. The court declined, however, to express any view with regard to the death sentence for treason committed during wartime.

The court held that the provisions of section 18 of the Criminal Procedure Act, 1977 were clear and unambiguous, and provided for the lapsing of the right to prosecute after the expiration of a period of twenty years from the date of the offence in the case of every crime other than one in respect of which the death penalty may be imposed.

By linking section 18 to those offences which were at the relevant date capital offences, Parliament clearly accepted that the list of such offences could change, and that the prescriptive provisions of section 18, as it was to be applied at a relevant date, would apply to those crimes which were not on the list of capital offences at that date.

The twenty-year prescription period may be interrupted only by the service of documents, such as summons. If, therefore, an accused is able to evade the law for twenty years, he will have gotten away with it.

The question is open as to whether or not prescription operates in the case of a person who has committed one of the listed exceptional crimes after the coming into operation of the Interim Constitution in 1994, where the twenty-year period lapsed before the amended section 18 took effect in 1997.

As Les Roberts has argued, the purpose of the prescription in the criminal law is to limit criminal accusations so that potential accused persons are not "perpetually [...] in suspense between hope and dread."

The twenty-year period runs even if the prosecuting authorities are unaware of the crime.

Although the effect of section 18 seems clear, writes Roberts, the exact legal nature of the provision is more elusive:

- When does the right of the state to prosecute a particular crime lapse?
- Does the alleged perpetrator acquire a corresponding right not to be prosecuted?
- If so, what is the nature of that right?

In South Africa, civil prescription affects remedies, not rights, and is therefore part of the law of procedure, not the substantive law. Various differences between civil and criminal prescription (like interruption, suspension and waiver), as well as the different policy considerations involved, lead Roberts to the conclusion that the Corpus Juris Secundum was correct in holding that criminal prescription confers a substantive right on the perpetrator not to be prosecuted. Substantive provisions, as opposed to procedural ones, do not operate retrospectively in the absence of clear indication to the contrary.

In its original form, section 18 excluded crimes for which the death penalty could be imposed from the ambit of the twenty-year prescription period. Due to the Interim Constitution's commencement, and the death penalty's being struck down in S v Makwanyane, the list of crimes for which the death sentence could be imposed shrank to the solitary crime of high treason in time of war.

The clear effect of this, argues Roberts, is that section 18 of the Criminal Procedure Act, 1977 excepted only treason in time of war from the prescription period. This was confirmed in S v De Freitas, where the court accepted the accused's argument that the effect of Makwanyane was that rape now prescribed after twenty years.

The amendments to the Criminal Procedure Act, 1977 came into operation in 1998, subsequent to the decision in S v De Freitas, and included the current list of exceptions to the twenty-year prescription period, which happen to be the same crimes as those for which the death sentence could have been imposed prior to 1994.

Furthermore, it was specified in section 27 of the Criminal Law Amendment Act that the new section 18 be deemed to come into operation on 27 April 1994.

The question, for Roberts, is whether this retroactivity will pass constitutional muster. If the retrospectivity is struck down, all crimes occurring between Makwanyane and the amendment to section 18 will fall into a lacuna.

==== Constitution s 35(3)(d) ====
In terms of section 35(3)(d) of the Constitution, every accused person has a right to a fair trial, which includes the right to have their trial begin and conclude without unreasonable delay. The concept of "unreasonableness" is not defined; the question is left open to interpretation.

As this right falls under the entitlement to a fair trial, a deliberate delay in bringing an accused before court will not be entertained.

The Constitution refers specifically to an "accused person." Only once a person has been accused of a crime, therefore, does he benefit from this right. There is some debate as to whether this right extends to the institution of a prosecution in the first place, or merely covers the situation where someone has been formally charged.

In extreme cases, the court may grant a permanent stay of prosecution, if the prosecution is not brought within a reasonable time.

===== Sanderson v Attorney-General, Eastern Cape =====
In Sanderson v Attorney-General, Eastern Cape, the Child Protection Unit of the SAPS had received information, at the end of October 1994, that the appellant, the deputy head of a primary school and a well-known singer in local church and musical entertainment circles, had allegedly sexually interfered with two girls who, at the time, had been standard-five pupils at his school.

On 1 December 1994, the appellant appeared at the office of the investigating officer. There he was informed that he was suspected of contravening the Sexual Offences Act, 1957. He denied the accusation and declined to make a statement. He was informally arrested and released on warning.

On 2 December 1994, the appellant appeared in court and was released on his own recognisance until early in the new year, with no charge having been put to him and without his being called upon to plead.

In August 1995, the decision was made to prosecute the appellant on two charges. The matter was set down for hearing over five days during the December 1995 school holidays.

As one of the alleged incidents had occurred outside the jurisdiction of the trial court, it was necessary to obtain a ministerial directive to enable all the charges to be heard in the Port Elizabeth regional court. The ministerial directive was delayed, resulting in the trial's being postponed to 1 July 1996.

On 10 May 1996, after many requests, a charge-sheet was served on the appellant for the first time.

In June 1996, a reply to a request for further particulars to the charge-sheet, together with various other documents, was supplied to the defence. The prosecution added an extra charge (which was subsequently withdrawn).

The defence anticipated the trial date and applied for a postponement; the trial was duly postponed to October 1996.

As certain State witnesses were unavailable during that time, the prosecution applied for a further postponement, so the trial was postponed to December 1996.

On 12 November 1996, the appellant applied to a Local Division for an order permanently staying the proceedings against him, and permanently prohibiting the respondent from re-instituting any prosecution against him in respect of the same charges.

The crux of the appellant's case was that an unreasonable and inexcusable delay in the prosecution of this matter had resulted in a serious infringement of his right to a speedy trial as contained in s25(3)(a) of the interim Constitution. In particular the appellant relied on two broad categories of prejudice:

1. "social prejudice," or the harm that had befallen him other than in relation to the actual court proceedings against him, and including the very substantial embarrassment and pain he suffered as a result of the negative publicity engendered by the nature of the charges, coupled with his occupation and prominent position in society; and
2. his own emotional and personal reactions of anxiety and stress, which necessitated the use of medically prescribed tranquillisers and sleeping tablets, together with the great strain placed on his limited financial resources by the drawn-out proceedings.

Although the Local Division found that there had indeed been an unreasonable delay and significant social prejudice, it dismissed the application after balancing the appellant's right to a speedy trial against society's interest in bringing suspected criminals to book.

The appellant was granted leave to appeal to the Constitutional Court, which considered the meaning of "within a reasonable time" in section 25(3)(a). The rights primarily protected were perceived to be

- liberty;
- security; and
- trial-related interests.

The court noted that the very nature of the criminal justice system was aimed at punishing only those whose guilt had been established in a fair trial, prior to which the accused was presumed innocent. The difficulty was that an accused person was subject to various forms of prejudice and penalty merely by virtue of being an accused. In addition to forms of social prejudice, the accused was also subjected to invasions of liberty, ranging from incarceration, or onerous bail conditions, to repeated attendance at remote courts for formal postponements.

In determining whether a lapse of time was reasonable, the court considered the "balancing test" formulated in the American case of Barker v Wingo, in terms of which the conduct of the prosecution and the accused were weighed up, and the following considerations examined:

- the length of the delay;
- the reasons the government assigned to justify the delay;
- the accused's assertion of his right to a speedy trial; and
- the prejudice to the accused.

The court expressed a need for circumspection, however, in relying on foreign precedent. The South African society and criminal justice system differed from those in other jurisdictions. The test for establishing whether the time lapse was reasonable should not be unduly stratified or preordained, as it was not helpful for the court to impose semi-formal time constraints on the prosecuting authority: That was law-making function, which it would be inappropriate for the court to exercise.

It was a fair, although tentative, generalisation that the lapse of time heightened the various kinds of prejudice that section 25(3)(a) sought to diminish. The court considered three of the most important factors bearing on the enquiry:

- the nature of the prejudice suffered by the accused;
- the nature of the case; and
- systemic delay.

====== Nature of the prejudice ======
The more serious the prejudice suffered by the accused, the shorter had to be the time within which the accused was tried. In principle, the continuing enforcement of this should tend to compel the State to prioritise cases in a rational way.

If the accused had been the primary agent of delay, he should not be able to rely on it in vindicating his rights under section 25(3)(a): for example where he had sought postponements or delayed the prosecution in ways that were less formal.

====== Nature of the case ======
The court held that it was not appropriate to specify "normal delays" for specific kinds of cases. This was better done by the Legislature. It is not simply a matter of contrasting simple and complex cases.

The prosecution should be aware of inherent delays and factor them into the decision of when to charge a suspect.

There should be proportionality between the kind of sentences available for a crime and the prejudice suffered by the accused. For example, pre-trial incarceration of five months for a crime whose maximum sentence was six months clearly pointed in the direction of unreasonableness.

====== Systemic delay ======
This includes the resource limitations that hampered the effectiveness of the police investigation or the prosecution of the case, and the delay caused by court congestion. While more excusable than individual derelictions of duty, there had to come a time when systemic causes could no longer be regarded as exculpatory. In principle courts should not allow claims of systemic delay to render the right nugatory.

====== Value judgment ======
Having isolated some of the relevant considerations, the court recognised that 'reasonableness' required a value judgment. In making the judgment, the court had to be mindful of the profound social interest in bringing the person charged with a crime to trial, and resolving the liability of the accused.

Delay could not be allowed to debase the presumption of innocence and become in itself a form of extra-curial punishment. In addition not this, the public interest was served by bringing litigation to finality.

====== Permanent stay of prosecution ======
A stay, the court found, is seldom warranted in the absence of significant prejudice to the accused.

Ordinarily, and particularly where the prejudice was not trial-related, there were a range of "appropriate" remedies less radical, including

- a mandamus requiring the prosecution to commence the case;
- a refusal to grant the prosecution a postponement;
- damages after an acquittal; and
- a release from custody for an awaiting-trial prisoner who has been held too long.

A bar was likely to be available only in a narrow range of circumstances: for example, where it was established that the accused had probably suffered irreparable trial prejudice as a result of the delay.

As the appellant in this case was not in custody and had continued working, and as the postponements were to dates which suited him and did not require frequent attendances at court, and as he was legally represented and could have opposed the postponements earlier and with greater vigour, the court held that this was not an appropriate case for a stay of prosecution. Accordingly, the appeal was dismissed. The court held that the delay in this instance was not unreasonable.

===== Wilde v Hoffert =====
In Wilde v Hoffert, on 19 June 1993, the appellants were arrested on charges of dealing in or possessing cocaine, and attempted murder. After their first formal appearance in the magistrate's court, they were granted bail. There followed a series of remands, initially to amend the conditions of bail and thereafter at the request of the prosecution, "for further investigation."

On 5 October 1993, the matter was set down for trial in the week of 24 to 28 May 1994. When the trial date came around, the case was not ripe for hearing, and so was postponed until 4 October 1994. By that date, however, the application had been not completed, and therefore was postponed to 3 March 1995, but even by that date the application was no nearer resolution than it had been five months before; the matter was struck from the court roll.

On 7 March 1995, the appellants withdrew their High Court application.

On 10 November 1995, the appellants and the fourth respondent were summonsed to appear in the Regional Court in Durban ten days later on essentially the same drug-trafficking charge as before. The presiding magistrate dismissed the defence argument and granted the prosecution's application for the case to be postponed to 1 April 1996, for trial.

On 13 March 1996, the appellants brought an application in the Natal High Court, claiming a stay of the prosecution. The High Court found that, while the Attorney-General was to blame for a substantial period of the delay in the prosecution, there were insufficient grounds for a stay of the prosecution in the absence of trial-related prejudice. The court acknowledged that the Constitution ranks the right to a speedy trial at the forefront of the requirements for a fair criminal trial. This means that the State is at all times, and in all cases, obligated to ensure that accused persons are not exposed to an unreasonable delay in the prosecution of the cases against them.

Prosecutors and presiding officers are constitutionally bound, therefore, to prevent infringement of the right to a speedy trial. Where such infringement does occur, or where it appears imminent, there is a duty to devise and implement an appropriate remedy or combination of remedies. What such remedy or remedies ought to be must be left to be determined in the light of the circumstances of each particular case.

The court held that a stay of prosecution could not be granted in the absence of trial-related prejudice or extraordinary circumstances. The court agreed, then, with the decision in Sanderson v Attorney-General, Eastern Cape that a permanent stay of prosecution was not appropriate relief in these circumstances.

===== S v Van Der Vyver =====
In June 2005, the accused was arrested and charged with murder, and was granted bail. In September and December 2005, he made further appearances in the magistrate's court. At the last such appearance, the case was remanded to the High Court for trial on 9 October 2006, but on that date the State applied for a further postponement on the following grounds:

- that the Court roll was overcrowded, and that part-heard cases had to be given priority over new cases; and
- that the prosecutor assigned to the case was herself involved in one such part-heard matter.

The defence opposed the postponement on the grounds of the accused's right to a speedy trial and to legal representation of his choice, and, further, applied for the matter to be struck off the roll if the State was unable to proceed.

The court held that, when considering an application for an adjournment, it should be guided by two principles:

1. that it is in the interests of society that guilty persons should not evade conviction by reason of an oversight or because of a mistake that could be rectified;
2. that an accused person, deemed to be innocent, was entitled, once indicted, to be tried with expedition.

The critical question was whether the lapse of time was reasonable, taking into consideration the nature of the prejudice suffered, the nature of the case, and the systematic delay.

The court had a discretion, which was to be exercised judicially on consideration of the particular case's facts and circumstances.

The areas of prejudice raised by the defence relating to finance, career advancement, widespread media coverage and social pressures on him and his family were not trial-related; they impacted on him personally, as they would on any accused involved in a high-profile trial. The court held, however, that the defence had also raised trial-related prejudices:

- It was possible that the accused's legal representatives and expert witnesses would not be available if the trial were to commence on a postponed date.
- The accused would probably incur substantial additional costs.
- With the passage of time, the memories of witnesses could dim, which could negatively impact on the trial and on the administration of justice.

The delay could not be ascribed, however, to a particular person or instance; it was due to a combination of factors, including the practice of continuing rolls, the overcrowding of rolls, the fact that certain matters had not been completed during the previous court term, the fact that certain prosecutors were unable to take on new matters, and the priority to be given to matters which were age-related, or where the accused were in custody.

The court acknowledged that, where there had been an unreasonable delay in a matter, the court was empowered by section 342A(1) of the Criminal Procedure Act, 1977 to hold an inquiry and to give direction as to the future conduct of the case. Taking into account, however, all the relevant factors, including

- the interests of society, the victim's family and the accused;
- the fact that the accused was not in custody;
- the duration of the delay;
- the reasons for the postponement;
- the nature and seriousness of the charge; and
- the systematic shortcomings,

it could not be found that the delay was unreasonable. The application for postponement was therefore granted.

===== Broome v DPP, Western Cape =====
In Broome v DPP, Western Cape, Broome was charged in the magistrate's court with fraud and contraventions of three statutes, due to offences committed from 1986 to 1994. Broome was a partner in charge of the audit by a firm of accountants of the OWT Group, and a director of the OWT Group.

In 1994, the OWT Group was placed under curatorship. Certain documents were seized and were thereafter, at all times, under the control of the State.

In 2003, Broome inspected the seized documents and found that a significant portion of the audit working papers originally seized from his firm had gone missing while under control of the State.

Broome brought an application for an order permanently staying the prosecution based on section 35(3)(d) of the Constitution. It was averred that the unacceptable long delay in bringing the prosecution—the investigation was completed in 1997 and prosecution only lodged in 2004—and the loss of audit records impaired B's ability to prepare and mount a proper defence to the charges.

The regional court refused the application, holding that the critical question was how our courts determined whether a particular lapse of time was reasonable or unreasonable, and what the appropriate remedy was. In determining this question, the courts have adopted the "balancing test," as decided in various decisions, in which the conduct of both the prosecution and the accused were weighed and the following considerations examined:

- the length of the delay;
- the reasons the government assigned to justify the delay;
- the accused's assertion of his right to a speedy trial; and
- the prejudice to the accused.

The court held that the delay had not been adequately explained, and was inexcusable. The prosecuting authority had been responsible for an undue and excessive delay; the fundamental right of Broome to a speedy trial had been infringed.

Furthermore, the importance of the audit documents for Broome to mount a proper defence could not be ignored; they were necessary. The loss of a significant portion of these documents would have a critical prejudicial effect on Broome. He would suffer irreparable trial prejudice should the suit continue. This prejudice, the court found, was real, significant and trial-related.

The question remained, therefore: Was a permanent stay of prosecution, in this case, the only appropriate remedy?

The court held that the circumstances rendered this case so extraordinary that a stay of prosecution did present itself as the obvious and only remedy. A permanent stay of prosecution was granted accordingly.

===== McCarthy v Additional Magistrate, Johannesburg =====
In McCarthy v Additional Magistrate, Johannesburg, McCarthy had been unsuccessful in an application for an order

- reviewing and setting aside a warrant for her arrest; and
- for the indefinite stay of the proceedings against her in the case in a magistrate's court, in which an inquiry was to be held with a view to the surrender of McCarthy to the United States to stand trial for conspiracy to murder, allegedly committed in 1985.

The original request to the South African authorities for the McCarthy's extradition was made in 1990. McCarthy was arrested on a warrant which was withdrawn on the following day, when a second warrant was issued and McCarthy was re-arrested. She was then discharged after an objection was sustained that the documentary evidence filed in support of the application for extradition was deficient.

In 1991, McCarthy was arrested on a third warrant. This was the warrant she wished to have set aside in casu. The matter was eventually heard in 1996, after postponements and much back and forth between the parties.

It was contended, firstly, that the third warrant had been incorrectly issued, as the magistrate had not exercised the discretion bestowed upon him. The State had been obliged, when the third warrant of arrest was applied for, to disclose that there had been two previous warrants of arrest issued, that the first had been withdrawn, and that the second had culminated in the appellant's discharge.

McCarthy also contended that she was entitled to the protection of section 25(3)(a) of the Interim Constitution: the right to a fair trial, which included the right to a trial within a reasonable time. She contended that, because of the various delays, her rights had been infringed; she was prejudiced in that the severe conditions attached to her release on bail had disrupted her studies, her personal life and her work.

The court held that, although the State had not disclosed the previous applications and the appellant's discharge to the issuing magistrate, if these facts had been disclosed they would not have affected the magistrate's decision to grant a warrant. This contention was therefore rejected.

In assessing whether or not there had been an unreasonable delay, the court divided up the period from the start of the proceedings until the present into three separate periods and examined each in turn:

1. September 1990 to November 1990, when McCarthy was arrested and subsequently discharged;
2. November 1990 to 8 November 1991, when McCarthy was arrested on the third warrant; and
3. November 1991 to the time of the present application.

The first period was held to be reasonable; so, too, the second. Regarding the third, the court held that there had been systemic delays, but that they did not render nugatory McCarthy's right to have her trial begin and conclude without reasonable delay.

The court further held that an indefinite stay would seldom be warranted in the absence of significant prejudice to the accused or extraordinary circumstances. McCarthy's appeal was therefore dismissed.

==== Criminal Procedure Act, 1977 s 342A ====
Section 342A of the Criminal Procedure Act, 1977 lists a number of measures to assist the courts in ensuring that trials are disposed of without undue delay.

According to this section, a court shall investigate any delay in the completion of proceedings which appears to the court to be unreasonable, and which could case substantial prejudice to the prosecution, the accused or his legal advisor, the State or a witness.

The factors that are to be considered in determining whether a delay is unreasonable are set out in subsections 342A(2)(a) to (i) of the Criminal Procedure Act, 1977, and are as follows:

- the duration of the delay;
- the reasons advanced for the delay;
- whether any person can be blamed for the delay;
- the effect of the delay on the personal circumstances of the accused and witnesses;
- the seriousness, extent or complexity of the charges;
- actual or potential prejudice caused to the State or the defence by the delay, including
  - a weakening of the quality of evidence;
  - the possible death or disappearance or non-availability of witnesses;
  - the loss of evidence;
  - problems regarding the gathering of evidence; and
  - considerations of cost;
- the effect of the delay on the administration of justice;
- the adverse effect on the interests of the public or the victims in the event of the prosecution being stopped or discontinued; and
- any other factor which in the opinion of the court ought to be taken into account.

There are also the measures set out in subsections 342A(3)(a) to (e), which are aimed at hastening the process. They are as follows:

- refusing further postponement of the proceedings;
- granting a postponement subject to any such conditions as the court may determine;
- where the accused has not yet pleaded to the charge, ordering that the case be struck off the roll and the prosecution not be resumed or instituted de novo without the written instruction of the attorney-general;
- where the accused has pleaded to the charge and the State or the defence is unable to proceed with the case, or refuses to do so, ordering that the proceedings be continued and disposed of as if the case for the prosecution or defence has been closed;
- ordering that
  - the state shall pay the accused concerned the wasted costs incurred as a result of an unreasonable delay caused by an officer employed by the State;
  - the accused or his legal advisor shall pay the State wasted costs incurred; or
  - the matter be referred to the appropriate authority for an administrative investigation and possible disciplinary action against any person responsible for the delay.

It must be noted that, although the final measure, in section 342A(3)(e), is on the statute books, an order of costs against the State has never been made, as the financial implications are very onerous.

== Search and seizure ==
The issue of search and seizure is mainly a statutory matter; it is dealt with in a variety of statutes. Sections 19 to 36 of the Criminal Procedure Act, 1977 (Chapter 2) set out the generic provisions governing the issue; other statutes, such as the Prevention of Crime Act and the South African Police Services Act, also deal with specific instances of search and seizure. Section 13(8) of the South African Police Services Act, for example, authorises roadblocks and searches. Most of the case authority in this topic deals, therefore, with the constitutionality of searches and seizures.

=== What may be searched and seized? ===
Chapter 2 of the Criminal Procedure Act, 1977 deals with the issue of search warrants, entering of premises, seizure, forfeiture and disposal of property connected with offences. Chapter 2 provides only generic provisions; it does not replace other search and seizure provisions in other laws, such as those mentioned above.

In general, what may be seized is discussed in section 20 of the Criminal Procedure Act, 1977: anything that is

- which concerned in, or on reasonable grounds believed to be concerned in, an offence or a suspected offence, whether in South Africa or elsewhere;
- which may afford evidence of an offence or a suspected offence, in South Africa or elsewhere; or
- which is intended or reasonably believed to be intended to be used in the commission of an offence.

As to what constitutes reasonable suspicion, see Mnyungula v Minister of Safety and Security.

=== General rule ===
The general rule is that seizure is permitted only in terms of a search warrant. Search warrants may generally be issued only by a magistrate or a justice of the peace. If, however, in the course of judicial proceedings, the article is required in evidence at such proceedings, the judge or presiding officer may issue the warrant.

A regional magistrate does not have the authority to issue a search warrant, unless it is issued during the course of criminal proceedings before him or her. Search warrants are to be construed with reasonable strictness. The offence being investigated must be properly specified.

See Beheermaatschappij Helling I NV v Magistrate, Cape Town.

=== Search by police official ===
The search warrant requires a police official to effect the search. A warrant cannot authorise private persons to search. See Extra Dimension v Kruger.

The search warrant is to be executed by day, unless the warrant clearly states the contrary. A search commenced by day does not become illegal once sun goes down, however. See Young v Minister of Safety & Security.

The searched person, or any person whose rights are affected by the search warrant, is entitled to a copy of the warrant. If, therefore, you lend your car to someone who is subsequently pulled over, and the car is searched, both you and the person to whom you lent the car are entitled to copies of the warrant.

Searched persons are only entitled to a copy of the warrant after its execution, however.

The State is not obliged to give notice of intention to apply for a warrant, as this could easily defeat the very purpose of the warrant

An operation to remove a bullet from a leg is not covered by search and seizure provisions. See Minister of Safety & Security v Xaba.

An overbroad warrant does not necessarily lead to total invalidity.

Generally on searches with warrants, see Toich v Magistrate, Riversdale.

=== Exceptions ===
There are exceptions to the principle that a search warrant is required. One such exception is where the searched person gives his consent. Once consent is granted to search, it may not be withdrawn at the seizure stage. See Nel v Deputy Commissioner of Police, Grahamstown.

Another exception is where a police official reasonably believes that the warrant would be issued if he applied for it in the ordinary course of things, and that the delay in obtaining the warrant would defeat the object of the exercise.

The person making an arrest may search the arrested person without a warrant.

The person lawfully in charge or occupation of premises may, if he reasonably believes that certain categories of goods may be on such premises, search them for such goods without a warrant.

Where state security may be endangered, and the police official believes reasonably

- that it is necessary to search the premises;
- that the warrant would have been issued if applied for; and
- that the delay in obtaining the warrant would defeat its object,

he may search without a warrant.

A police official may enter premises without warrant to take a statement from anyone on such premises, but in the case of a private dwelling the consent of the occupier is also required.

=== Disposal of seized articles ===
The police official seizing an article

- may make suitable disposal arrangements if the article is perishable;
- may, if the article is stolen or is suspected to be stolen, return it to the person from whom it was stolen, if the person from whom it is seized so consents—in which case the person to whom article is returned must keep it available for any subsequent criminal proceedings; and
- shall, if neither of the above two courses are followed, give distinctive identification and retain the article in police custody.

If no criminal proceedings are instituted, or if the article is not required for evidence or a court order in criminal proceedings, the article must be returned to the person from whom it was seized, if such person may lawfully possess it. If such person may not lawfully possess it, it goes to the person who may lawfully possess it. If no-one may lawfully possess it, the article is forfeited to the State. No person may lawfully possess drugs or an unlicensed firearm, for example.

If criminal proceedings are instituted, and an admission of guilt is paid, the article is disposed of similarly to the case when there is no prosecution.

If the trial has commenced, the article goes to court for trial. At the conclusion of the trial, the presiding officer must make an order as to the disposal of article. The article is returned to person from whom it was seized, if such person may lawfully possess it.

If such person is not entitled to it, or may not lawfully possess it, the article is to go to the person entitled thereto, if he may lawfully possess it. If, for example, Xanadu steals Yeats's cellphone, Xanadu may lawfully possess the article, but is not entitled to it, since Yeats is the owner of the phone.

If no person is entitled to or may lawfully possess the article, it is forfeited to State.

A court convicting a person may declare any "weapon, instrument or other article by means whereof the offence in question was committed, or which was used in the commission of such offence," and which was seized under the provisions of the Criminal Procedure Act, 1977, to be forfeited to State. Similar provisions apply to any vehicle, container or other article used for a crime relating to illicit drugs or liquor, precious metals or stones, housebreaking or theft.

Section 35 further provides for an extensive procedure to safeguard the rights of innocent third party owners or rights holders.

A court which convicts or acquits an accused shall declare any article which is forged or counterfeit, or which cannot lawfully be possessed by any person, to be forfeited to the State.

Any weapon, instrument, vehicle, container or other article declared forfeited under section 35(1) shall be kept for thirty days from the date of forfeiture, or until a final decision, in terms of a section 35(4)(a) application, is made.

According to s35(4)(a), the court in question may, at any time within three years from the date of forfeiture, upon application by any person other than the accused, who claims a vested right, inquire into and determine any such right.

If the court finds that the article in question

- is the property of the person making the application, it shall set aside the declaration of forfeiture and return the article to such person, or, if the State has disposed of the article, direct that such person be compensated by the State; or
- was sold to the accused in pursuance of a contract under which he becomes the owner or the article, upon payment of the stipulated price, the court shall direct that the article be sold by public auction, and that the seller be paid out of the proceeds of the sale an amount equal to the value of his rights under the contract, but not exceeding the proceeds of the sale; If the State has disposed of the article, the court shall direct that the said seller be likewise compensated.

The magistrate within whose area of jurisdiction the article was seized may, on application (and if satisfied that such offence is punishable in such country by death or by imprisonment for a period of twelve months or more, or by a fine of R500 or more), order such article to be delivered to a member of a police force established in such country.

=== Constitutionality ===
In terms of section 14 of the Constitution, "Everyone has the right to privacy, which includes the right not to have

- "their person or home searched;
- "their property searched;
- "their possessions seized; or
- "the privacy of their communications infringed."

There have been no cases yet in the Constitutional Court deciding the constitutionality of Chapter 2 of the Criminal Procedure Act, 1977. There are cases, however, which deal with similar provisions in other legislation, and which indicate that, should a constitutional challenge to Chapter 2 arise, the court will probably find its provisions to be constitutional.

In Mistry v Interim National Medical and Dental Council of South Africa, the Constitutional Court struck down a provision in other legislation giving sweeping powers to inspectors to search and seize without warrant. In the course of the judgment, Sachs J seems to state obiter that Chapter 2 of the Criminal Procedure Act, 1977 appears to be in line with constitutional requirements. See also Magajane v Chairperson, North West Gambling Board.

In Investigating Directorate: Serious Economic Offences and Others v Hyundai, the Constitutional Court found provisions broadly similar to Chapter 2 to be constitutional. It seems, therefore, that Chapter 2 of the Criminal Procedure Act, 1977 will pass constitutional muster. A careful reading of Chapter 2 shows throughout a balancing of the interests of the individual and of society.

On the question of the admissibility of evidence obtained in violation of rights, see the entry on the law of evidence in South Africa. There is no constitutional need for the State to give notice of its intention to apply for a search warrant.

Although Thint v NDPP deals with warrants under section 29 of the National Prosecuting Authority Act, 1998, the same would apply to warrants under the Criminal Procedure Act, 1977. If the police go beyond the terms of a search warrant and seize additional material not covered by the warrant, that is no basis for declaring the entire search unconstitutional.

== Legal representation ==
There is a basic right to legal representation. In terms of sections 35(2)(b) and 35(3)(f) of the Constitution, the accused may choose his own lawyer, and is entitled to a lawyer, no matter how trivial the case against him. Sections 35(2)(c) and 35(3)(g) show the tension between the ideal of having every accused person represented, and the practical affordability of this ideal.

Furthermore, section 73 of the Criminal Procedure Act, 1977 states that an accused is entitled to assistance after arrest and at criminal proceedings.

If the accused cannot afford a lawyer, he is entitled to have a lawyer assigned by State at the State's expense, but only if substantial injustice would otherwise result. See Hlantlalala & Others v Dyanti NO & Another. See also Ehrlich v CEO, Legal Aid Board. There is no exact meaning to the term "substantial injustice." It depends on the circumstances of each case. The likelihood of imprisonment without the option of a fine, for example, would probably be considered substantial injustice.

Note that the State not obliged to provide the lawyer of the accused's choice. See S v Vermaas; S v Du Plessis. In S v Halgryn, the court held that, if legal representation is assigned by State, the accused has little choice in the matter and cannot demand that the State assign to him counsel of his choice.

S v Dangatye is an exception to the general rule that an accused may not demand that the State assign to him counsel of his choice. The accused in casu did not want a specific lawyer, as the lawyer did not speak his language. The court held, seeking to be sensitive to the multilingual nature of South Africa, made a sort of exception for Dangatye.

In S v Cordier, the court held that, where an accused has indicated that he desires legal aid, and is not given an opportunity, before the commencement of the trial, to deal with the outcome of his application, after having been advised of the outcome thereof, and to consider his position before pleading to the relevant charge, the trial will be unfair. The court noted that, when a layman applies for legal aid, and thereafter appears without being informed of the outcome of her or his application, he could easily come to the conclusion that the application has been refused. A fair trial requires that, where an accused has applied for legal aid, the situation is resolved before the accused is permitted or, in appropriate circumstances, compelled to plead. In addition, a fair trial requires that any application for legal aid is carefully and completely noted in such a way that another court which is later burdened with the matter is properly apprised of that fact.

In addition to the rights just mentioned, the accused has the right to be informed of these rights. Failure to inform, however, is not per se fatal to the State's case. It depends on the circumstances of each case. If the accused is a senior attorney, for example, he cannot claim that he did not know of this right. See S v Morrison.

If an accused declines to exercise his right to legal representation, the court should question the accused to ensure that the accused is aware of and the consequences of not exercising this right, and to clear up any misunderstandings. This is so that it may be certain that the accused is making an informed decision. See S v Sikhipha and S v Nkondo. See also S v Ndlovu; S v Sibisi.

There are several components, then, to this constitutional right:

- the right to legal representation;
- the right to be informed of the right to legal representation;
- the right to legal representation at State expense in certain circumstances; and
- the right to be informed of the right to legal representation at State expense in certain circumstances.

Although the right to choose one's legal representation is a fundamental right, to be zealously protected by the courts, it is not an absolute right; it is subject to reasonable limitations.

The accused is not entitled to indefinite postponements merely because his first-choice legal representative is not available for a long time, or so that he can earn enough money to afford the lawyer of his choice. See S v Swanepoel.

The right to legal representation is important not only for the trial itself, but also for pre-trial evidence-gathering. See S v Melani.

The right to legal representation also means representation of a certain standard. See S v Chabedi. S v In S v Halgryn, the court noted that passing judgment on the standard of legal representation given to the accused is problematic as it involves making a decision on the merit and capabilities of the lawyer. See S v Mvelase. See S v Tandwa.

In S v Halgryn, the court held that, although the right to choose a legal representative is a fundamental right and one to be zealously protected by the courts, it is not an absolute right and is subject to reasonable limitations. It presupposes that the accused can make the financial arrangements for engaging the services of the chosen lawyer, and that the lawyer is readily available to perform the mandate. An accused may not, through the choice of any particular counsel, ignore all other considerations and the convenience of counsel is not overriding. If a legal representative is assigned by the State, the accused has little choice. The accused may not demand that the State assign to her or him counsel of her or his choice, but the accused may object to a particular representative on limited grounds, like conflict of interest or incompetence. Whether a defence is so incompetent that it makes the trial unfair is a factual question that does not depend upon the degree of ex post facto dissatisfaction of the litigant; the assessment must be objective. The failure to take certain basic steps, such as failing to consult, stands on a different footing from the failure to cross-examine effectively or the decision to call or not to call a particular witness. It is relatively easy to determine whether the right to counsel was rendered nugatory in the former type of case, but, in the latter instance, where counsel's discretion is involved, the scope for complaint is limited.

== Disclosure by prosecution ==
On the pre-constitutional position, see R v Steyn, where the police docket was privileged from disclosure. South Africa's approach to disclosure by the prosecution is now widely acknowledge to have been flawed prior to the advent of the Constitution. Assistance, therefore, was derived from Canada.

The position in Canada is adumbrated in R v Stinchcombe, which became a very influential precedent in South African cases decided shortly after the commencement of the Interim Constitution. It was held in Stinchombe that the fruits of the police investigation are not the property only of the prosecution; the defence is entitled to pre-trial disclosure.

For the development of this area immediately after the advent of constitutional democracy in South Africa, see Phato v Attorney-General, Eastern Cape; Commissioner of the South African Police Services v Attorney-General, Eastern Cape.

According to section 32(1) of the Constitution, everyone has the right to access to any information held by the State and any information that is held by another person and that is required for the exercise or protection of any rights. Section 32(2) states that national legislation must be enacted to give effect to this right. According to subsections 35(3)(a) and (b) of the Constitution, every accused person has a right to a fair trial, which includes the right to be informed of the charge with sufficient detail to answer it, and to have adequate time and facilities to prepare a defence.

The Promotion of Access to Information Act, 2000 is the national legislation that was enacted to give effect to the right to access to information. Of particular importance is section 39 of the Act, which places major limitations on the disclosure of police dockets. The reason for this limitation is that the mechanisms provided for in section 39 are very complicated and application of this Act to police dockets would overwhelm the system.

We are left, therefore, with only the rights in terms of section 35(3) of the Constitution when it comes to police dockets.

The position of an undefended accused is set out in S v Shiburi. It would be considered to be irregular for an undefended accused not to be afforded access to the police docket.

In light of the case of Shabalala & Others v Attorney-General of Transvaal, it is important to consider at what stage of the proceedings the disclosure is sought. That the State has decided to charge accused, and has already disclosed the docket, does not prevent the State from investigating the case further. See Du Toit v DPP.

The accused is not ordinarily entitled to disclosure of the docket for the purpose of a bail application. The State may choose to disclose the docket for the purpose of a bail hearing, if it so desires, but there is no obligation to do so. This is because the purpose of a bail application is not to pass judgment of the guilt or innocence of the accused, but to consider the risk in releasing the accused. Thus it is considered to be a reasonable limitation on the right to access to the police docket. See S v Dlamini.

It is also important to know what information may be withheld, and the procedure when the State seeks to withhold information.

In general, see S v Crossberg and S v Rowand.

As to the question of whether or not the accused is entitled to interview State witnesses, see Shabajaja.

== Indictments in the High Court ==
An indictment has two functions:

1. It is the document on which a High Court trial is based (therefore it is the equivalent of the charge sheet in the lower court).
2. It is the way in which an accused is transferred from a lower court to a High Court for trial.

As with charge sheets in the lower courts, s144(2) of the Criminal Procedure Act, 1977 states that the indictment must contain

- the charge against the accused;
- name of the accused;
- address of the accused; and
- description of the accused with regard to sex, nationality and age.

In addition to this, s144(3) of the Criminal Procedure Act, 1977 states that the indictment must be accompanied by a summary of substantial facts (this is not needed in the lower courts).

Before 1977, High Court trials were preceded by a preparatory examination in which evidence which tended to show the guilt of the accused was led, then the case was referred to the DPP to decide whether or not to prosecute the accused based on the findings in the preparatory examination. This was a time-consuming and expensive exercise as all the evidence thus had to be brought before the court twice: once for the preparatory examination and again for the trial.

After the promulgation of the Criminal Procedure Act, 1977, still in force today, the procedure is the same for the High Court as for the lower court: It is a summary trial. To bridge the gap created, the Criminal Procedure Act, 1977 requires a summary of substantial facts to accompany indictments. The summary of substantial facts must be present unless the accused pleads guilty at a preliminary appearance at a lower court and the case is therefore merely sent for sentencing.

The summary of substantial facts should contain adequate information so as to inform the accused of the allegations. Whether the summary is adequate depends on the nature of the case. See S v Mpetha.

When there is a variance or discrepancy between the summary and the evidence presented, s 144(3)(b) provides that the court can grant the accused a suitable adjournment.

It must be noted that the summary is not strictly an integral part of the indictment, but merely an accompaniment; thus the State is not bound by what is in the summary. The State is not held to the summary, therefore, in the same way it would be held to the charge. This discrepancy may still be important, however. for the accused to cross-examine on. See S v Van Vuuren.

As the State is not bound by the summary, it is not required to seek an amendment of a defective or erroneous summary. See S v Mlonyeni.

The list of witnesses which is in the indictment is a list of potential witnesses; therefore it may be a long list and not necessarily every witness mentioned will be called. Section 144(3)(a)(ii) of the Criminal Procedure Act, 1977 permits the State to withhold the names and addresses of certain witnesses if there is a danger of tampering or intimidation, or if it is necessary for state security. If this is done, the practice is to mention in the list of witnesses that one or more names have been withheld.

=== Methods of transfer to High Court for trial ===
There are two main methods of transfer (each requiring an indictment), i.e.:

1. transfer in terms of s75(2) of the Criminal Procedure Act, 1977 where there is no preliminary plea in the Magistrates Court (this is the more common method); and
2. transfer in terms of Chapter 19 (sections 119-122) of the Criminal Procedure Act, 1977 where the accused was requested to make a preliminary plea under s119.

==== s 75(2) ====
This is the method used to transfer the accused from a lower court which does not have the jurisdiction to try the case

- because that court has no territorial jurisdiction; or
- because the charge is such that it cannot be tried in that court. This is a common way to transfer cases to the High Court on murder and rape charges.

It is also the method used to transfer a case from the Magistrate's Court to a Regional Court where the magistrate does have territorial and offence-type jurisdiction, but the State feels that it is likely that the sentence will exceed the magistrate's sentence jurisdiction.

==== Chapter 19 of the Criminal Procedure Act, 1977 (sections 119–122) ====
Section 119 concerns the appearance of the accused in a magistrate's court on a charge requiring trial in High Court. Sometimes the prosecutor uses Chapter 19 to secure a preliminary plea from the accused in the Magistrate's Court. The prosecutor may put the charge to the accused, even if such charge is not triable in the magistrate's court. The prosecutor must have written authority from the DPP to take this step. The State not obliged to go this route to get case to the High Court for trial. It may rely instead on section 75.

Section 120 concerns the lodging of the charge sheet and the recording of proceedings. The pleadings must be recorded.

Section 121 concerns a plea of guilty by the accused, in which case the magistrate proceeds with questioning, as with section 112. If the magistrate is satisfied that it is a genuine plea of guilty, he adjourns the case for a decision of the DPP, who may

- arraign for sentence before the High Court or another court having jurisdiction (for example, the regional court on a murder charge);
- arraign for summary trial on any charge or charges before a court having jurisdiction; or
- institute a preparatory examination.

Section 122 deals with a plea of not guilty by the accused, in which case the magistrate proceeds as with a plea of not guilty in a summary trial as stated in section 115. Thereafter magistrate adjourns proceedings for a decision of the DPP, who may

- arraign for summary trial on any charge or charges before a court having jurisdiction; or
- institute a preparatory examination.

Section 106 says that an accused is entitled to a verdict at trial, but a plea under s119 does not entitle an accused to a verdict under s106(4). The rationale for this is that this plea is not meant to mark the commencement of the trial; it is merely an indication of the accused's attitude towards the charge. Furthermore, if a verdict was required, the magistrate would, in effect, be able to convict an accused of a crime that may be out of the court's jurisdiction. See S v Hendrix.

== Rule against duplication of convictions ==
The rule against duplication of convictions is sometimes wrongly called the rule against splitting of charges.

In terms of section 83, where there is uncertainty as to what charges the facts will prove, the accused may be charged with all or any of the possibilities at once. Charges may also be framed in the alternative. However, if the prosecutor chooses to allege the charges in the alternative, a conviction cannot be obtained on both the charges. As it is in the alternative, it is one or the other. Objection may not be taken to the so-called "splitting of charges;" only to a duplication of convictions.

Where an act or omission constitutes an offence under two or more statutory provisions or is an offence against a statutory provision and the common law, the person guilty of such act or omission shall, unless the contrary intention appears, be liable to be prosecuted and punished under either the statutory provision or, as the case may be, under the statutory provision or the common law, but shall not be liable to more than one punishment for the act or omission constituting the offence.

There are two traditional tests:

1. the single-intention test; and
2. the evidence test, which asks whether the evidence which establishes the one offence at the same time also establishes the other. See S v Grobler, S v Prins and S v Benjamin. For example, does the evidence establishing the commission of a robbery also establish the commission of theft and assault?

In terms of the single-intention test, if a person committed several acts, each of which could be an offence on its own, but which constituted a continuous transaction carried out with a single intent, his or her conduct would constitute only a single offence.

The problem with these tests is that they are theoretically helpful but are difficult to apply.

S v Benjamin appeared to reverse previous authority until the case of S v Moloto, where the SCA overturned the principle in Benjamin. Therefore it is possible to have a conviction on charges of both attempted murder and robbery: The court in Moloto did not say that the finding in Benjamin was wrong, but stated that the circumstances in Benjamin were highly exceptional.

The bottom line is that convictions on both attempted murder and robbery are possible.

When considering whether or not there was an improper duplication of charges, the definition of the offences in question is a logical starting point. See S v Longdistance (Natal).

Note that neither test is infallible; common sense must prevail. See R v Khan. See S v Pakane, where convictions of an accessory after the fact of murder and of defeating the ends of justice amounted to an improper duplication of convictions.

The problem used to be that because of the nature of negligence, the courts were uncertain if it was proper to have multiple counts of culpable homicide for the same action.

In the past, it used to be that because there was no intention and only one act, there was only one charge, as in S v Mampa.

The SCA has now held, however, that there can be multiple convictions for culpable homicide arising out of the same act. See S v Naidoo.

For an example of the application of the principle, see S v Whitehead, where the court ruled in the circumstances of the case that convictions of culpable homicide and public violence would constitute improper duplication.

== Further particulars to charge ==
An accused may request the prosecution to supply particulars or further particulars of any matter alleged in the charge. Further particulars may only be requested before the commencement of evidence. It can be after the plea, in other words, so long as no evidence has been led yet. The reason for this is that before 1977, the procedure was carried out in such a way that the accused had to plead as early as possible. If particulars are only requested after the plea, the accused has no right to have the charge quashed if he is dissatisfied with the particulars.

The request is to be in writing. If the State refuses to supply the particulars or if the accused is not satisfied with the particulars delivered, the court may order the delivery of particulars. The court may also adjourn to give the State time to deliver particulars.

The accused is not entitled to request further particulars when pleading under section 119 or 122A. This is because the trial has not commenced yet.

The accused is not entitled to particulars as to which documents the State intends using as exhibits during trial: This is not an issue for particulars. It is regarded as evidence, not part of the charge itself. See Du Toit v DPP.

On delivery, the particulars form part of the record. The trial proceeds as if charge has been amended in accordance with the particulars. The State is then bound by the particulars as it is bound by the charge.

=== General principles ===
Although section 84(2) of the Criminal Procedure Act, 1977 states that it is sufficient to describe a statutory charge in the words of the statute, this cannot be used as justification for a charge that would otherwise be objectionable. Thus the State can't refuse to say more if the accused requires further particulars.

The accused is entitled to as much information about the offence as is necessary for a thorough preparation of his defence. See S v Cooper. The purpose of particulars is not to confuse the defence, so the so-called "scatter-gun" approach is unacceptable. See S v Sadeke. See also R v Verity-Amm.

The test for whether or not further particulars should be granted is whether there is reasonable need of accused for such particulars, but each case is to be decided on its own facts. See R v Adams.

If the particulars are denied by trial court, this could lead to a setting aside of a conviction on appeal on grounds of irregularity. See R v Verity-Amm.

In assessing the adequacy of particulars, the trial court may have regard to a summary of the substantial facts. If the trial is in the High Court, there must be summary of the substantial facts accompanying the indictment. The skimpier the summary of substantial facts, the greater the need for particularity in the charge. See S v Mpetha.

The State cannot be expected to furnish particulars it does not have. See S v Alexander. Thus where any of the particulars are unknown to the prosecutor it shall be sufficient to state that fact in the charge.

Generally, the State is not obliged to furnish in particulars the evidence whereby the charge will be proved. Circumstances may occur, however, where such evidence will have to be disclosed. See S v Cooper.

When the State relies on common purpose between the accused and others, the State is obliged, if requested, to disclose the facts on which it will rely to draw inference of common purpose.

If a lower court refuses to order particulars, the accused can approach the High Court for a mandamus. See Behrman v Regional Magistrate, Southern Transvaal. It is worth noting, however, the general reluctance of higher courts to get involved in uncompleted proceedings. The test is prejudice to the accused.

If for technical reasons, in the High Court trial, the court refuses to order particulars, there can be no approach to the Supreme Court of Appeal to compel the High Court to order particulars. See S v Suliman. The only remedy would be appeal or special entry after the conclusion of the trial. See, however, S v Western Areas Ltd, which seems to indicate that if there are very good grounds for approaching the SCA, it may be considered.

== Pleas of autrefois convict and autrefois acquit ==
When one enters a plea of autrefois convict or autrefois acquit, one is contending that one has previously been convicted or acquitted on the same charges. The principle is that one should not be tried twice for the same offence. In other legal systems, the expression "double jeopardy" is sometimes used. One ought to look carefully at the wording of the relevant subsections, in particular at section 35(3)(m) of the Constitution, with its slight difference in wording compared with section 106.

There is a threefold test for autrefois acquit:

1. Was the acquittal for the same offence?
2. Was it by a court of competent jurisdiction?
3. Was it on the merits?

For autrefois convict, the first two legs apply. The third is inapplicable because a conviction would necessarily be on the merits.

=== Same offence ===
In subsections 106(1)(c) and (d), an extended meaning is given to the words "substantially identical." The principle is not limited to offences for which the accused could have been convicted at a previous trial: that is, it is not limited to competent verdicts listed in Chapter 26 of Criminal Procedure Act, 1977.

Examples of the application of the principle may be located in S v Nkosi, S v Nyathi and R v Constance. Some assistance here may also be gained from the principles relating to the duplication of convictions. Note the apparent exception in cases such as death ensuing after the completion of a trial on a charge of assault.

=== Court of competent jurisdiction ===
In this regard, see R v Ntoyaba and S v Pokela (which includes a foreign court).

=== On the merits ===
For an adumbration of the meaning of "on the merits," see S v Moodie, S v Naidoo, S v Mthetwa, DPP, KZN v Regional Magistrate, Vryheid and sections 322, 324 and 313.

Proper notice of the plea must be given.

Note that, in England, there is now a new provision allowing for a retrial in spite of acquittal in certain classes of cases.

== Plea and sentence agreements ==
The situation prior to the commencement of section 105A of the Criminal Procedure Act, 1977 is illustrated in S v Blank, North Western Dense Concrete CC v Director of Public Prosecutions, Western Cape and Van Eeden v Director of Public Prosecutions (Cape). The basic problem was that the accused was not sure whether the court would go along with the State's attitude as to sentence.

This issue was comprehensively addressed by section 105A of Criminal Procedure Act, 1977, which introduced detailed procedures for plea and sentence agreements. The procedures may be divided into five stages:

1. preliminaries;
2. court checks on formalities;
3. plea questioning;
4. court checks sentence agreement, and thereafter convicts and sentences if everyone is satisfied; and
5. trial de novo, if not all parties are satisfied.

=== Preliminaries ===
Section 105A(1)(a) requires the written authority of the NDPP and agreement in respect of a plea of guilty and just sentence. In terms of section 105A(1)(b), the prosecutor must consult with investigating officer, but see section 105A(1)(c). The complainant must be afforded the opportunity to make representations. Section 105A(2) provides what must be in agreement. The court may not participate in the negotiations.

=== Court checks on formalities ===
Next the prosecutor informs the court of the agreement. The court asks the accused to confirm that the agreement has been entered into. The court must satisfy itself on certain procedural requirements, as to consultation with the investigating officer and the opportunity of the complainant to make representations. The prosecutor and the accused will have an opportunity to correct any defects if the court is not satisfied.

Upon being satisfied, the court requires the accused to plead, and orders that the contents of the agreement be disclosed in court.

=== Plea questioning ===
In terms of section 105A(6)(a), the court questions the accused to ascertain

- that he confirms the terms of the agreement and admissions;
- that he admits the allegations in the charge to which there is a plea of guilty; and
- that this is freely and voluntarily done.

In terms of section 105A(6)(b), if the court is not satisfied that the accused is guilty, or if the accused does not admit any allegation in the charge, or has incorrectly admitted such, or if the court is satisfied, for any other reason, that the plea should not stand, then court will record a plea of not guilty and order the trial to start de novo before another presiding officer (unless the accused waives such right to another presiding officer).

If the court is satisfied with the plea, then the matter proceeds to the fourth stage listed above. The court does not at this stage enter a conviction.

=== Court checks sentence agreement ===
The court now proceeds to consider the sentence agreement. It exercises its usual powers in regard to sentence information.

In terms of section 105A(8), if the court is satisfied that the sentence agreement is just, it informs the prosecutor and the accused accordingly, and then convicts and sentences as per the agreement. As to the meaning of "just sentence," it is not required that the court find that it is the exact sentence that it would have imposed.

In terms of section 105A(9), if the court is not satisfied that the agreement is just, it informs the prosecutor and the accused of what it considers a just sentence. The prosecutor and the accused may then abide by the agreement on the charge (for example, if there has been a plea to a lesser charge), whereupon the court convicts and proceeds to the sentence stage. The prosecutor and the accused at this point have the right to address the court and adduce evidence on sentence.

Alternatively, in terms of section 105A(9)(b), the prosecutor and the accused may withdraw from the agreement. In terms of section 105A(9)(d), in the event of withdrawal, there must be a trial de novo before a different presiding officer (but the accused may waive his right to a different presiding officer).

The provisions of section 105A must be complied with strictly. The court may not simply impose the sentence it thinks fit.

=== Procedure if agreement set aside ===
In terms of section 105A(10), in the event of a trial de novo after withdrawal, the agreement is null and void, and no regard is to be had to negotiations, agreement, etc., unless the accused consents to the recording of such as admissions. There may be no further plea or sentence agreement on the charge arising from the same facts. The prosecution may proceed on any charge.

In terms of section 105A(11), the NDPP is to issue directives. An example of the new provisions in practice is to be found in S v Sassin & Others. Section 105A does not appear to prevent the informal type of agreement as in North Western Dense Concrete.

== Inquests ==
Inquests in South Africa are governed by the Inquests Act, 1959.

=== Nature ===
As the court put it in Marais v Tiley, "An inquest is an official investigation into a death occurring otherwise than from natural causes, which has not been the subject of a criminal prosecution."

=== Purpose ===
The court added, in Marais v Tiley, that "the underlying purpose of an inquest is to promote public confidence and satisfaction; to reassure the public that all deaths from unnatural causes will receive proper attention and investigation so that, where necessary, appropriate measures can be taken to prevent similar occurrences, and so that persons responsible for such deaths may, as far as possible, be brought to justice."

=== Commencement ===
Section 2 of the Inquests Act, 1959 provides that anyone who becomes aware of an unnatural death (that is, a death by other than natural causes) has a duty to report such to a member of the police, unless he has reason to think that it has already been done.

Section 3 provides that the police official who receives such information has a duty to investigate. If the body is available, it must be examined by a doctor, usually at a post-mortem examination.

Section 4 provides that, on conclusion of the examination, the police official submits statements and information, together with the report, to the prosecutor. The prosecutor may call for additional information.

If the prosecutor decides to prosecute in connection with the death, the inquest process stops there.

In terms of section 5, however, if no prosecution is to be instituted, the prosecutor submits the statements to magistrate of the district.

If it appears to the magistrate, on the materials submitted, that a death took place, and that it was not due to natural causes, the magistrate causes an inquest to be instituted. If the inquest is to be held in another district, or before a judge or regional magistrate, the magistrate forwards the papers accordingly.

The death of a stillborn child is not the death of a "person" for the purposes of the Act.

If, at any time after inquest has been decided on, it comes to the notice of the judicial officer that criminal proceedings are being instituted in connection with the death, he must stop the proceedings.

Where there has been a death at sea, and no body has been brought ashore, the court does not have jurisdiction to hold an inquest.

In terms of section 6, the inquest is to be held in the district where the incident causing death took place. The Minister of Justice may order that the inquest be held before a judge or regional magistrate in certain circumstances.

In terms of section 8, the judicial officer causes witnesses to be subpoenaed for the inquest. He may have regard to the request of any person who has a substantial and peculiar interest in the inquest.

Laws governing criminal trials are applied, with necessary changes, to the summoning of witnesses and the giving of evidence. Section 203 of the Criminal Procedure Act, 1977 applies, with its privilege against giving self-incriminating answers.

Section 10 provides that the inquest is to be held in public, unless the judicial officer decides that there are good reasons to the contrary.

In terms of section 11, the prosecutor examines (or questions) the witnesses. Other persons with an interest may, with the permission of the judicial officer, also examine.

Section 13 provides that the judicial officer may allow affidavits instead of oral testimony.

In terms of section 16(2), after evidence is concluded, the judicial officer makes findings as to

- the identity of deceased;
- the cause or likely cause of death;
- the date of death; and
- whether the death was brought about by an act or an omission involving an offence by any person.

If the judicial officer unable to make any such finding, he records accordingly. The onus for findings is a balance of probabilities.

In case of a death, where the body is destroyed or not found, and if the judicial officer makes a finding beyond a reasonable doubt that a death occurred, special provisions apply. The judicial officer then makes findings as required by section 16(2), and if the judicial officer is not a judge he sends the findings to the High Court on review. If confirmed on review, such amounts to a finding of presumed death. If the judicial officer at the inquest was a judge, such finding amounts to a finding of presumed death.

Section 17 provides that, after findings have been made, the judicial officer must in the following circumstances refer the record to the DPP:

- where he is unable to make any finding under section 16(2);
- where judicial officer makes a finding that someone is prima facie responsible for bringing about the death; and
- where the DPP requests the judicial officer to forward the record.

The DPP may then request the judicial officer to reopen the inquest to hear further evidence, whereupon the judicial officer is obliged to reopen it. On conclusion of such further evidence, the judicial officer again makes section 16 findings and sends the record back to the DPP.

Section 17A makes special provisions for the Minister to order the judge to reopen and take over a concluded inquest. This legislation introduced for the purpose of the inquest in In re Goniwe.

== Asset Forfeiture ==
This section deals with asset forfeiture under the provisions of POCA only. There are, of course, other asset-forfeiture provisions, such as under section 34 and 35 of the Criminal Procedure Act, 1977 and section 20 of the Counterfeit Goods Act, 1997.

POCA is a wide-ranging measure aimed at cracking down on organised crime. It creates offences related to racketeering activities, money laundering, assisting another to benefit from proceeds of organised crime, failure to report suspicious activities, and gang-related activities. It also has wide-ranging provisions for forfeiture of assets.

The relevant parts of POCA are Chapters 5 and 6. There are definitions in section 1 for the entire Act, as well as in section 12 for the purposes of Chapter 5.

The purpose of these provisions is to crack down on organised crime by making it unprofitable. The Preamble to Act refers to the rapid growth of organised crime, its threat to the economic stability of country, the inadequacy of the common law to deal with the problem and the failure to keep pace with international measures.

NDPP v Mohamed gives an excellent summary of the purpose and methodology of Chapters 5 and 6.

Chapters 5 and 6 are both aimed at preventing profit from crime.

There is an important difference between the two chapters: Chapter 5 is conviction-based; Chapter 6 is not.

=== Proceeds of unlawful activities (Chapter 5) ===
The term "defendant" is used here instead of "accused." Although these proceedings are "conviction-based," they are treated as civil proceedings.

==== Confiscation orders ====
In terms of section 18, when a defendant is convicted of an offence the court may, on application of the prosecutor, enquire into any benefit which defendant may have derived from

- that offence;
- any other offence of which defendant is convicted at the same trial; and
- any criminal activity which the court finds to be "sufficiently related" to those offences.

If the court finds that defendant has so benefitted, it may make an order for payment to State of any amount it considers appropriate, up to the maximum value of

- the defendant's proceeds of the criminal activity; and
- the amount which might be realised under section 20. s 20 provides that the amount which might be realised shall be equal to the sum of all realisable property and all affected gifts made by the defendant, less the sum of all obligations having priority. ("Affected gifts" are defined in s 12, read with s 16. They include gifts made by the defendant less than seven years previously, and gifts made more than seven years previously if it was property received by the defendant in connection with offences committed by him or any other person. s 16 includes as a gift any property transferred for value substantially below its true value. The difference between transfer value and true value is regarded as the gift value for the purposes of.

Sections 21 and 22 provide for special ways of proving what the proceeds of the unlawful activities were.

Confiscation orders have the effect of civil judgments.

If the defendant absconds or dies before the confiscation order has been made, the court can still in certain circumstances make a confiscation order.

==== Restraint orders ====
These are orders issued in anticipation of a confiscation order to keep safe from disposal the property, etc., to be sought in a confiscation order.

Such orders may be made

- when a prosecution has been instituted against a defendant;
- when a confiscation order has been made, or there are reasonable grounds for believing that such order may be made, against such defendant; or
- when the court is satisfied that a person is to be charged with an offence and there are reasonable grounds for believing that confiscation order may be made.

The NDPP can apply ex parte to High Court for an order prohibiting any person from dealing in any manner with any property which is subject to the order. Conditions and exceptions may be stipulated in the order.

Such an order may relate to

- realisable property specified in the order;
- all realisable property held by such person; and
- all property which, if transferred to such person after the making of the restraint order, would be realisable property.

Court to which the application made may issue a provisional restraint order having immediate effect and simultaneously grant a rule nisi calling on the defendant to show cause why the provisional order should not be made final. The object of such orders is not to enrich the State, but to deprive the convicted person of ill- gotten gains. The court must have reasonable grounds for granting such an order; a mere summary of allegations by the NDPP insufficient. A mere assertion by the NDPP is not enough, but it is not necessary to prove that a final order will definitely be made.

In terms of section 26(7), the court making the restraint order may also make an order to compel the defendant to disclose the whereabouts, etc., of the property over which he may have effective control. This power should not be lightly exercised, as it tends to infringe on the right not to incriminate oneself. Note that a restraint order is appealable. The court granting the restraint order has no inherent jurisdiction to rescind that order.

Sections 30 to 36 deal with the mechanics of the realisation of property after the confiscation order. For a full discussion of Chapter 5, see S v Shaik.

=== Civil recovery of property (Chapter 6) ===
Proceedings under this Chapter are civil. They are not conviction-based. They have been described as "complex and tightly intertwined, both as a matter of process and substance."

The process begins with an application by the NDPP to the High Court for a preservation order. The application may be ex parte (s 38(1)), but that does not mean that the ordinary principles of audi alteram partem do not apply. The court makes an order if there are reasonable grounds for believing the property is

- an "instrumentality of an offence" referred to in Schedule 1; or
- the proceeds of unlawful activities.

"Instrumentality of an offence" is defined in section 1 as any property which is concerned in the commission or suspected commission of an offence, whether within the Republic or elsewhere, at any time before or after the commencement of the Act.

"Proceeds of unlawful activities" is defined in section 1 as any property or part thereof or any service, advantage, benefit or reward which was derived, received or retained, directly or indirectly, in connection with or as a result of any unlawful activity carried on by any person, whether in the Republic or elsewhere, at any time before or after the commencement of the Act.

"Unlawful activity" is defined as any conduct which constitutes a crime or which contravenes any law, whether such conduct occurred before or after the commencement of the Act, and whether such conduct occurred in the Republic or elsewhere.

For the meaning of these two concepts, see NDPP v R O Cook Properties. This SCA case involved three separate cases. In two, the issue was whether buildings used for a brothel were an "instrumentality of an offence." The SCA said no: The term had to be strictly interpreted. In the third case, the issue was whether or not money deposited into an account under a false name, done to hide it from the Receiver of Revenue, was "proceeds of crime." SCA said no: This term also had to be strictly interpreted.

Another important case is S v Prophet, where premises used for the manufacture of drugs were an "instrumentality of an offence." In NPPP: in re appeal, money used for bribing police officer was found to be an "instrumentality of an offence."

When considering whether something is an "instrumentality of an offence," the court should adopt a narrow interpretation. The mere use of a venue is not sufficient to render it an "instrumentality."

There should also be proportionality between the nature of the offence and the value of the asset in question. In NDPP v Braun, the court refused to grant an order where a house was used for sexual offences, on the grounds of a lack of proportionality.

Section 38 has been described as "part of a complex, two-stage procedure." The CC has ruled that this provision is not unconstitutional.

Preservation orders under section 38 expire after ninety days, unless application for forfeiture order is lodged, or unless the order is rescinded before the expiration of the period.

If the preservation order is in force, the NDPP may apply for forfeiture order of all property subject to the preservation order. The court will make such order if it finds on balance of probabilities that the property in question is

- an instrumentality of a Schedule 1 offence; or
- the proceeds of unlawful activities (as defined in section 1).

The rights of persons who, on balance of probabilities, acquired such property legally and neither knew nor had reasonable grounds for believing that it was an instrumentality or was the proceeds of unlawful activities, are protected.

=== Criminal Assets Recovery Account ===
Chapter 47 provides for the establishment of a Criminal Assets Recovery Account. All proceeds of asset forfeiture go into this account.

== Child Justice Act ==
The Child Justice Act, 2008 (CJA) came into operation on 1 April 2010. It regulates comprehensively the entire spectrum of criminal procedure for children (people under eighteen years) from the pre-trial stage through to appeal.

The Child Justice Act, 2008 works parallel with the Criminal Procedure Act, 1977. This can be confusing, as one needs to keep both Acts open whenever there is a child involved in the criminal justice system.

The Preamble to the Child Justice Act, 2008 sets out the aims of the Act. Its ideals are lofty. Only time will tell whether they can be attained via the mechanism of Child Justice Act, 2008. Sections 2 and 3 take this theme further. Noteworthy, too, is the extensive definition section. Of particular note are the following:

- "'child justice court' means any court provided for in the Criminal Procedure Act, dealing with bail application, plea, trial or sentencing of a child."
- "'diversion' means diversion of a matter involving a child away from the formal court procedures in a criminal matter by means of the procedures established by Chapter 6 and Chapter 8."
- "'restorative justice' means an approach to justice that aims to involve the child offender, the victim, the families concerned and community members to collectively [sic] identify and address harms, needs and obligations through accepting responsibility, making restitution, taking measures to prevent a recurrence of the incident and promoting reconciliation."
- "'symbolic restitution' means the giving of an object owned, made or bought by a child or the provision of any service to a specified person, persons, group of persons or community, charity or welfare organisation or institution as symbolic compensation for the harm caused by that child."

=== General provisions ===
Section 6 ranks the seriousness of possible offences a child can commit according to three groups:

1. Schedule 1 offences;
2. Schedule 2 offences; and
3. Schedule 3 offences.

Note that these are schedules to Child Justice Act, 2008, not the Criminal Procedure Act, 1977. Section 6 specifies that the seriousness of the offences increases from Schedule 1 through to Schedule 3.

Section 7 raises the minimum age of criminal capacity from seven to ten years. Between the ages of ten and fourteen, there is a presumption against criminal capacity, which the state may rebut by way of proof beyond reasonable doubt.

In the light of this alteration in the law, section 9 is strange: It talks about a child under the age of ten who commits a crime. This is a contradiction in terms, since section 7 provides that a child under that age cannot commit a crime. What it probably means to refer to is a child under the age of ten who committed an act that would have amounted to a crime but for the fact that the child was under the age of criminal capacity.

Section 9 stipulates that, in such a case, the police may not arrest the child; they must take the child to its parents or, if they are unavailable, to some other appropriate adult. If none of the above are available or suitable, they must take it to a youth-care centre. The police must also then notify a probation officer.

If a child is over ten, but under fourteen, a prosecutor considering whether to prosecute is required to consider a long list of criteria about capacity to commit a crime, whether a prosecution is in fact warranted, and whether some form of diversion would not be more appropriate instead of prosecution.

Determining the age of the child is extensively provided for in Chapter 2, Part 3, of the Child Justice Act, 2008.

=== Securing presence of the child accused before preliminary inquiry ===
Chapter 7 of Child Justice Act, 2008 provides for a preliminary inquiry as the first step whenever a child is to be brought before court. Section 17 provides for three methods of securing the presence of a child at a preliminary inquiry:

1. written notice under section 18;
2. summons under section 19; and
3. arrest under section 20.

For each of these three methods, the equivalent method of securing attendance under the Criminal Procedure Act, 1977 is amended somewhat to cater for the fact that the accused is a child. In particular, section 20 provides that a child may not be arrested for a Schedule 1 offence (an offence that falls into the least serious category) unless there are compelling reasons. "Compelling reasons" include:

- the child not having a fixed residential address;
- the child being likely to continue committing offences;
- the child being a danger to others; and
- the offence being in the process of being committed when the arrest is affected.

Whatever method of securing attendance is adopted, there is an obligation to inform a probation officer of the fact of notice, summons or arrest, as the case may be, as soon as possible, but within a maximum period of 24 hours.

=== Placement of child prior to sentence ===
Section 21 makes it clear that, whenever possible, a child who has been arrested should be released. Prior to first appearance in court, this can occur either by way of bail or written notice. At first appearance, the magistrate may release the child into the custody of its parents or another suitable adult, or on the child's own recognisance (that is, on warning) or on bail.

If the child has been arrested on a Schedule 1 offence, section 22 requires a police official to release the child on bail prior to first appearance, unless the parents and guardian cannot be found despite diligent effort, or unless there is substantial risk that release would constitute a danger to someone else or the child itself. If the police official does not release a child who has been arrested on a Schedule 1 offence, the official must supply the magistrate with a report as to why the child was not released.

Where a child who is in custody is appearing at a preliminary inquiry, and the inquiry is to be postponed to a later date, the presiding magistrate is obliged to consider releasing the child from custody under one or another mechanism.

Sections 26 to 33 contain detailed provisions about where a child who is not to be released shall be detained. The underlying principle appears to be that, wherever possible, the child shall be detained at a special facility and not be exposed to adult detainees.

=== Assessment of child ===
Save for exceptional circumstances, all children who have been arrested, or otherwise given notification of appearance at a preliminary inquiry, must be assessed by a probation officer. Section 35 sets out what the assessment should encompass. It should

- "establish whether a child may be in need of care and protection in order to refer the child to a children's court in terms of section 50 or 64;"
- "estimate the age of the child if the age is uncertain;"
- "gather information relating to any previous conviction, previous diversion or pending charge in respect of the child;"
- "formulate recommendations regarding the release or detention and placement of the child;"
- "where appropriate, establish the prospects for diversion of the matter;"
- "in the case of a child under the age of 10 years or a child referred to in section 10 (2) (b), establish what measures need to be taken in terms of section 9;"
- "in the case of a child who is 10 years or older but under the age of 14 years, express a view on whether expert evidence referred to in section 11 (3) would be required;"
- "determine whether the child has been used by an adult to commit the crime in question;" and
- "provide any other relevant information regarding the child which the probation officer may regard to be in the best interests of the child or which may further any objective which this Act intends to achieve."

=== Diversion by prosecutor for minor offences ===
Section 41 empowers a prosecutor to choose diversion instead of prosecution in the case of a Schedule 1 offence. Diversion, which features prominently in the Act, is some or other program that runs outside the formal criminal justice system. If the prosecutor decides on diversion, the diversion must be made an order of court.

=== Preliminary inquiry ===
Section 43 sets out the nature and requirements of a preliminary inquiry. It is an informal pre-trial procedure, inquisitorial in nature, and may be held in a court or any other suitable place. Subsection 2 sets out the objectives of a preliminary inquiry, which are to "consider the assessment report of the probation officer, with particular reference to

- "the age estimation of the child, if the age is uncertain;"
- "the view of the probation officer regarding the criminal capacity of the child if the child is 10 years or older but under the age of 14 years and a decision whether an evaluation of the criminal capacity of the child by a suitably qualified person referred to in section 11 (3) is necessary;" and
- "whether a further and more detailed assessment of the child is needed as referred to in section 40 (1) (g)."

The preliminary inquiry must also

- "establish whether the matter can be diverted before plea;
- "identify a suitable diversion option, where applicable;
- "establish whether the matter should be referred in terms of section 50 to a children's court referred to in section 42 of the Children's Act;
- "ensure that all available information relevant to the child, his or her circumstances and the offence are considered to make a decision on diversion and placement of the child;
- "ensure that the views of all persons present are considered before a decision is taken;
- "encourage the participation of the child and his or her parent, an appropriate adult or a guardian in decisions concerning the child; and
- "determine the release or placement of a child, pending
  - "the conclusion of the preliminary inquiry;
  - "the appearance of the child in a child justice court; or
  - "the referral of the matter to a children's court, where applicable."

Subsection (3)(a) provides that a preliminary inquiry must be held in every case involving a child, unless the prosecutor has diverted the case, or the child is under ten, or the case has been withdrawn.

Subsection (3)(b) requires a preliminary inquiry to take place within 48 hours of arrest, if there has been an arrest. The extensions of the 48-hour period that ordinarily apply under section 50 of the Criminal Procedure Act, 1977 apply here, too. If there has not been an arrest, the preliminary inquiry must take place within the time specified in the notice or summons, as the case may be. A preliminary inquiry is considered to be a first appearance as under section 50 of the Criminal Procedure Act, 1977.

Chapter 7 contains a number of other provisions relating to procedures at preliminary inquiries.

=== Diversion ===
Section 51 sets out the objects of diversion, which are to

- "deal with a child outside the formal criminal justice system in appropriate cases;
- "encourage the child to be accountable for the harm caused by him or her;
- "meet the particular needs of the individual child;
- "promote the reintegration of the child into his or her family and community;
- "provide an opportunity to those affected by the harm to express their views on its impact on them;
- "encourage the rendering to the victim of some symbolic benefit or the delivery of some object as compensation for the harm;
- "promote reconciliation between the child and the person or community affected by the harm caused by the child;
- "prevent stigmatising the child and prevent the adverse consequences flowing from being subject to the criminal justice system;
- "reduce the potential for re-offending;
- "prevent the child from having a criminal record; and
- "promote the dignity and well-being of the child, and the development of his or her sense of self-worth and ability to contribute to society."

Section 52 provides that a case may be diverted if, after consideration of all the relevant material presented at a preliminary inquiry or trial, it appears

- that the child acknowledges responsibility for the offence;
- that there is a prima facie case;
- that the child, together with its parent or a suitable adult, accepts diversion; and
- that the prosecutor or DPP agrees to diversion.

The prosecutor may agree to diversion if the case falls under Schedule 1 or 2, provided that, if the case falls under Schedule 2, the prosecutor must first consult the victim and the investigating officer. If the case falls under Schedule 3, the DPP may in writing agree to diversion, if exceptional circumstances exist. Here, too, the DPP must consult the victim and the investigating officer. Once the prosecutor or DPP has agreed to diversion, the court makes an order that the case be diverted.

Section 53 sets out numerous diversion options, including orders that the child attend school, avoid certain peers, good behaviour, etc.

Section 58 provides that, if the magistrate receives information that the child is not complying with a diversion order, a warrant for arrest may be issued. Once the child is brought before court, the magistrate inquires into the matter. If it appears that the failure to comply was not the child's fault, the court may allow the diversion to continue, with or without modification. If, however, it appears that the fault lay with the child, the magistrate may discontinue diversion and order a prosecution to proceed.

Under section 59, if a child complies with a diversion order, there may thereafter be no prosecution for the offence in question.

Section 60 provides for a proper register to be kept of all diversions, so that track can be kept.

=== Trial of child in Child Justice Court ===
If a child is to be tried together with an adult, the ordinary provisions of the Criminal Procedure Act, 1977 apply to the adult, and the special provisions of the Child Justice Act, 2008 to the child. A child must be assisted by a parent or suitable adult. The trial is to take place without delay. There are time limits to the length of postponement where a child is in custody.

=== Sentencing ===
Section 69 sets out a complex list of considerations to be borne in mind when sentencing a child. Section 71 provides that a pre-sentencing report must be obtained before a child is sentenced. Sections 72 to 78 set out various sentencing options. These include the usual range of sentences found in the Criminal Procedure Act, 1977, but with additional controls. In addition, there is provision for community-based sentences and restorative-justice sentences. Section 77 deals with imprisonment. Imprisonment may not be imposed on a child under fourteen. If a child is fourteen or older, imprisonment may only be imposed as a last resort. Additionally, if the offence is a Schedule 1 or 2 offence, there are further restrictions.

=== Legal representation ===
There are several provisions governing legal representation. The most striking provision is to be found in section 83, which states that, if a child refuses legal representation, the court must nevertheless see that the Legal Aid Board appoints a representative to assist the court.

=== Appeal and automatic review ===
The new provisions relating to the requirement of leave to appeal for cases involving children are contained in section 84, and have already been referred to. In summary, there is an automatic right of appeal to a child under sixteen in all cases, and for a child over sixteen but under eighteen if direct imprisonment has been imposed.

=== Complexity ===
This legislation is extremely complex. There are many parts of it that may prove difficult to achieve in practice, especially if many calls are made on the time and skill of probation officers.

== See also ==
- Crime in South Africa
- Law of South Africa
- National Forensic DNA Database of South Africa
- South African civil procedure
- South African criminal law
