= Behrman v Regional Magistrate, Southern Transvaal =

South African legal case

In Behrman v Regional Magistrate, Southern Transvaal 1956 (1) SA 318 (T), an important case in South African criminal procedure, the court merely held that a Provincial Division has jurisdiction to grant a mandamus directing the magistrate to order the Crown prosecutor to furnish particulars for which he has been asked by an accused.

The principle to be applied is that the court will make an order if the accused is likely to be prejudiced by a refusal, in the court below, to order the particulars.
