= S v Moloto =

In S v Moloto (1982), an important case in South African criminal procedure, the two appellants were charged with both attempted murder and robbery.

The court held that where attempted murder is committed in connection with a robbery the State is entitled, according to the circumstances, to charge the accused both with robbery and with attempted murder.

Furthermore, the court is entitled to find him guilty on the two separate offenses provided that it was proved beyond reasonable doubt that the accused also had the intention to kill and not merely to use force.
