= S v Swanepoel =

South African legal case

In S v Swanepoel, at his appearance in the magistrate's court, Swanepoel indicated that the date decided for the high-court trial did not suit him. He then launched the present application, and asked for an order postponing the trial for at least seven months to enable him to earn money to pay for the services of an advocate of his own choice.

The court held that to expect a court to wait for seven months to begin with the trial so that the accused could find work in order to earn an income to pay for the fees of a legal representative was beyond the limits of acceptability, as the criminal process could not be made dependent on the accused's earning ability. Therefore, the application was dismissed.

== Notes ==
- S v Swanepoel 2000 (1) SACR 384 (O); 2000 (7) BCLR 818 (O)
- Bekker. Criminal Procedure Handbook. 8th Edition. Juta. 2007. pp 78 & 243.
- The Law of South Africa. Cumulative Supplement 2001. Part 1. p 268. (supplement to vol 5(2), para 219).
