= Beheermaatschappij Helling I NV v Magistrate, Cape Town =

South African legal case

In Beheermaatschappij Helling I NV v Magistrate, Cape Town (2007), the applicants, who were, variously, Dutch and South African nationals, sought orders declaring:

- three search warrants, issued for purposes of assisting in obtaining evidence for use against the applicants in the Netherlands, to be unconstitutional and invalid;
- the execution of the searches by members of the SAPS to be unconstitutional and invalid;
- the actions of the police in allowing the Dutch authorities access to and copies of the material seized to be unconstitutional and invalid; and
- an order directing the return to the applicants of the original and/or copies of the material seized which were still in the possession or under the control of the respondents.

The court made note of the following applicable legal principles:

- The terms of a search warrant had to be construed with reasonable strictness and, ordinarily, literally.
- A warrant had to convey, intelligibly, the ambit of the search it authorized.
- If the warrant was too general, or if its terms went beyond those permitted by the authorizing statute, it was liable to be found to be invalid and to be set aside.
- It had to specify its object intelligibly and within the bounds of the empowering statute.

The court found that

- the warrants placed no limit on the number or nature of the documents liable to be seized;
- they gave no indication as to how far back in time the searches could extend;
- the descriptions of certain of the documents liable to be seized were vague and extremely wide; and,
- as revealed by the off-site searches, most of the material seized in execution of the first warrant was not authorized by the warrants; most of it was confidential.

In respect of the search of the applicants' offices, the search warrant authorized only a search for and seizure of "documentation." Construing the warrant with reasonable strictness, and in accordance with its express wording, it did not authorize the seizure of the CPUs and other equipment for storing electronic information from the premises. Nor did it authorize an off-site search.

Furthermore, the-off site search had not been necessary, as the electronic data found by the police could have been copied at the premises without the necessity of removing it off-site and thus disrupting the applicants' business for several days. It was trite that search and seizure had to be carried out in the least intrusive and disruptive manner. The police had no power to disrupt the applicants' business more than was necessary. In the circumstances, the removal by the police of the bulk of the electronic material from the applicants' offices was unlawful, in that it was not authorized by the warrant.

The court also held that all three search warrants were fatally flawed by being both too vague and too broad.

It followed that the issuing of the warrants, as well as the searches themselves, were unlawful. In addition, the material seized at the applicants' offices was not authorized by the warrant. The warrants, therefore, were declared invalid, and the respondents were directed to return the material seized.

== Notes ==
- Beheermaatschappij Helling I NV v Magistrate, Cape Town 2007 (1) SACR 99 (C)
- Annual Survey of South African Law 2007, p 351
- "Again search warrants" (2007) 100 Servamus 71
