= Sabah Al-Ahmad Natural Reserve =

Protected area in northern Kuwait

- Location: Kuwait
- Nearest city: Al Jahra
- Established: 1987

Sabah Al-Ahmad Natural Reserve (Arabic: محمية صباح الأحمد الطبيعية) is a protected natural area in northern Kuwait, located north of Kuwait Bay and near the Subiya area. Covering approximately 325–330 square kilometres, it is one of the protected terrestrial areas in the State of Kuwait. The reserve protects a range of desert and coastal ecosystems, including rocky escarpments, wadis, gravel plains, sand dunes, salt marshes and coastal mudflats. It is managed under the supervision of the Environment Public Authority and Kuwait institute of scientific Research and is intended to conserve the country's natural habitats, biodiversity and wildlife.

== History ==
The reserve was established in 1987 and was officially designated as a protected area in 1988. It was originally associated with Kuwait's national park conservation initiative and was later named Sabah Al-Ahmad Natural Reserve. Following the Gulf War, the area underwent clearance of land mines, rehabilitation and fencing before being reopened in 2004. The reserve is named in honour of Sheikh Sabah Al-Ahmad Al-Jaber Al-Sabah, the former Emir of Kuwait.

== Geography ==
The reserve is located north of Jahra and Kuwait Bay, in the Subiya and Jal Al-Zor region. Subiya Road divides the protected area into coastal and desert sections. Its landscape includes the Jal Al-Zor escarpment, which rises above the surrounding coastal plains, as well as valleys, depressions, gravel plains, sandy areas and salt flats. The elevation ranges from coastal areas at sea level to elevated terrain exceeding 100 metres. Wadi Ar-Rimam is among the notable natural features within the reserve.

== See also ==
- Kuwait Bay
- Jahra Nature Reserve
