= Richard of Wallingford (constable) =

Richard of Wallingford (14th century), constable of Wallingford Castle and landowner in St Albans, played a key part in the English peasants' revolt of 1381. Though clearly not a peasant, he helped organise Wat Tyler’s campaign, and was involved in presenting the rebels’ petition to Richard II. The petition called for an end to feudal serfdom, the ending of services to a feudal lord, to abolish market monopolies and restrictions on buying and selling goods. Tyler refused to accept a charter offered by the king, despite Richard of Wallingford's encouragement.

Richard of Wallingford took a letter from the king to St Albans, where a rebellion was in progress. William Grindecobbe, leader of the revolt in St Albans, and his supporters including William Cadington, John Barbour were complaining about the suppression of rights to grind grains. They believed that this was permitted by an ancient charter of liberties of King Offa, that had been since been denied by the abbot of St Albans Abbey. Wallingford argued with the abbot about these rights. using the king's letter and called for the ancient charter to be produced. However, during the course of the discussions, news arrived that Tyler had been killed, which led to the rebels reducing their terms.

With Richard II back in control, most of Wallingford's co-rebels were executed, but Wallingford was sent to jail and later pardoned by the king. Meanwhile, the king revoked all the charters issued during the rebellion, and restored the rights of the abbot of St Albans.

Richard of Wallingford, constable, is not to be confused with the earlier Richard of Wallingford, mathematician and abbot of St Albans Abbey.
