= S v Mvelase =

South African legal case

In S v Mvelase (2004), Mvelase was charged with three counts of rape, committed against the same complainant, and was convicted and referred to a High Court for sentencing.

Before the Court confirmed the conviction and proceeded to sentencing of the accused, it was contended on his behalf that the proceedings in the court a quo had not been in accordance with justice, because the magistrate made no further enquiries when the accused's legal representative had closed his case without him testifying, although it had been indicated to the complainant that he would testify.

The court noted that “it would be a sad day indeed” if a presiding officer were to be required to assume the incompetence of legal representatives and was thus required to treat the accused as if he were unrepresented.

The court held that a judicial officer should be entitled to assume that a legal representative had informed the accused fully of her or his rights and that the decision not to testify was that of the accused himself.

The mere fact that in cross-examining witnesses the legal representative may have alluded to what the accused would testify did not lead, where the accused then failed to testify, to the inevitable inference that the defense case had been closed against the accused's wishes or that she or he did not know of her or his rights to testify.
