= S v Shiburi =

In S v Shiburi, an important case in South African criminal procedure, the court held that judicial officers have a duty to inform an unrepresented accused of his legal rights, which include the right to the docket or State witnesses' statements, unless there is a ground for refusal.

Where the appellant is undefended, he is entitled to be informed of this right; a failure to do so is a misdirection or irregularity on the part of the presiding judicial officer.

In this case, however, the appeal court held that insofar as an irregularity has been committed, it had not been so fundamental as to vitiate the trial proceedings.
