= Jal Al-Liyah =

Protected area in Kuwait

- Location: Kuwait
- Nearest city: Al Jahra
- Established: 2016

Jal Al-Liyah (Arabic: مسيجة جال اللياح, lit. 'Jal Al-Liyah Fenced Area') is one of the protected terrestrial areas in the State of Kuwait, established to rehabilitate degraded desert ecosystems and conserve native vegetation and wildlife. Located in the Al-Liyah region of north-western Kuwait, the area forms part of the country's efforts to restore natural habitats affected by human activities, particularly quarrying, land degradation and the loss of vegetation.

The protected area was designated under Supreme Council for the Environment Resolution No. 7 of 2016 and is supervised by the Kuwait Institute for Scientific Research (KISR). Its management focuses on ecological restoration, protection of native plant species and the development of suitable habitats for wildlife, including resident and migratory birds.

== Geography ==
Jal Al-Liyah is situated in the desert landscape of north-western Kuwait, within the Al Jahra Governorate region. The protected area consists of fenced desert habitats and is divided into northern and southern sections by Iron Horse Road. It lies west of Highway 80.

The landscape is characterised by arid desert terrain, rocky and gravelly surfaces, sandy areas and shallow depressions. The region experiences a typical desert climate, with very hot summers, mild winters and limited annual rainfall.

The protected area covers approximately 179.47 square kilometres according to Kuwait's Environmental Monitoring Information System (eMISK). The Environment Public Authority also lists an area of approximately 147 square kilometres in its descriptive information.

== History and establishment ==
The Jal Al-Liyah Fenced Area was designated in 2016 under Supreme Council for the Environment Resolution No. 7/2016.

The establishment of the protected area was primarily intended to rehabilitate land affected by years of exploitation and degradation, particularly the removal and disturbance of topsoil. These activities had affected natural vegetation and the ecological condition of the surrounding desert landscape.

The Kuwait Institute for Scientific Research undertook rehabilitation initiatives, including the cultivation and planting of native desert plant species. Fencing the area also helps restrict activities that could further damage the recovering vegetation and natural habitats.

== Migratory Birds Photographed from Jal Al Liyah ==
Eastern Imperial Eagle at jal al liyah

Eastern Imperial Eagle at jal al liyah

Montagus harrier at jal al liyah

Steppe Eagle during passage migration
