= William Grindecobbe =

Leader of the English Peasants' Revolt of 1381

William Grindecobbe or Grindcobbe was one of the peasant leaders during the English Peasants' Revolt of 1381. A Townsman of St Albans, he was a substantial property owner there and has been described as a 'hero' of the revolt.

== Life ==
His name implies that he was a miller of grain. He was one of a number of millers who took part in the revolt, and has been described as having been eloquent and literate. It has also been suggested that he was an excommunicate priest, possibly an alumnus of St Albans Abbey. It thus possible that he was motivated at least in part to rebel as a result of the pressures of papal taxation.

Along with Wat Tyler and John Wrawe, he was one of the key leaders of the peasants during the revolt of 1381, leading the townspeople of St Albans on 15 June.

He was executed in 1381 along with John Wrawe and John Ball. His trial and execution was overseen by Henry le Despenser.

== Role in Peasants' Revolt ==
During the Peasants' Revolt of 1381, he became well known for his actions against the high lord Thomas de la Mare, Abbot of St. Albans. He led a deputation to King Richard II, whom the rebels met at Mile End which 'extorted' a letter from the King to the Abbot forcing the latter to give up the royal charters he held to the rebels. They ultimately destroyed the charters and a portion of the abbey itself.

He was executed along with other leaders of the Revolt, and although his trial was deemed to have been fair, it has also been described as being in the nature of a 'show trial.' It has been suggested that he made a speech from the scaffold implicating John Wycliffe in the rebellion.

== Sources ==
Most of the details about his life have been derived from the writings of Thomas Walsingham, who was a monk resident in an abbey, and may well have witnessed Grindecobbe's execution.
