= Peasants' Revolt =

1381 uprising in England

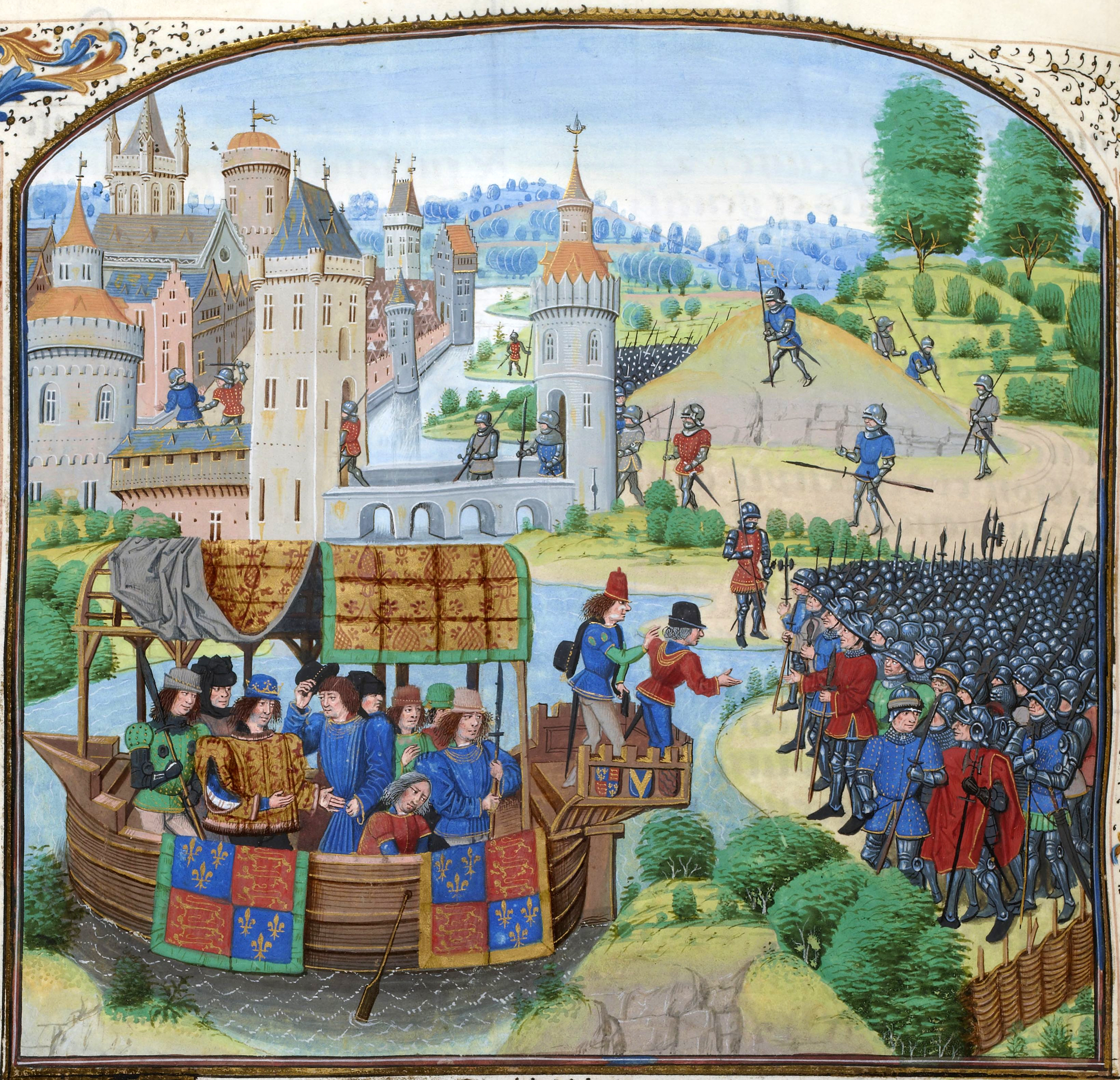
- The boy-king Richard II meets the rebels on 14 June 1381
| Date | 30 May – November 1381 |
| Location | England |
| Result | Sacking of Tower of London and mass execution of royal officials; Charters granted to rebel towns; Eventual suppression of revolt and execution of rebel leaders |

Belligerents
| Rebels | Kingdom of England |

Commanders and leaders
| Wat Tyler †; Jack Straw (executed); Thomas Baker (executed); John Wrawe (executed); John Ball (executed); William Grindecobbe (executed); Johanna Ferrour | King Richard II; Sir William Walworth; Archbishop Simon Sudbury (executed); Bishop Henry Despenser; Sir Robert Hales (executed); Sir Richard Lyons (executed); Sir John Cavendish (executed) |

Casualties and losses
| At least 1,500 killed | Unknown |

The Peasants' Revolt, also named Wat Tyler's Rebellion or the Great Uprising, was a major uprising across large parts of England in 1381. The revolt had various causes, including the socio-economic and political tensions generated by the Black Death in the 1340s, the high taxes resulting from the conflict with France during the Hundred Years' War, and instability within the local leadership of London. The revolt heavily influenced the course of the Hundred Years' War by deterring later Parliaments from raising additional taxes to pay for military campaigns in France.

Interpretations of the revolt by academics have shifted over the years. It was once seen as a defining moment in English history, in particular causing a promise by King Richard II to abolish serfdom, and a suspicion of Lollardy, but modern academics are less certain of its impact on subsequent social and economic history.

The revolt has been widely used in socialist literature, including by the author William Morris, and remains a potent symbol for the political left, informing the arguments surrounding the introduction of the Community Charge in the United Kingdom during the 1980s.

== Terminology ==
The term "Peasants' Revolt" does not occur in contemporary chronicles, which did not give the events a specific title, and the term "peasant" did not appear in the English language until the 15th century. In the 18th and 19th centuries it was generally known as "the Insurrection of Wat Tyler". Though Paul Strohm once commented "which eighteenth- or nineteenth-century historian first used the doubly discredited phrase 'Peasants' Revolt' I have been unable to determine", he first found the term used in John Richard Green's Short History of the English People in 1874. The name has been critiqued by modern historians such as Strohm and Miri Rubin, both on the grounds that many in the movements were not peasants, and that the events more closely resemble a prolonged protest or rising rather than a revolt or rebellion. Alternative terms include "the 1381 Rising" and "the English Rising of 1381".

== Background and causes ==
=== Economics ===
The Peasants' Revolt was fed by the economic and social upheaval of the 14th century. At the start of the century, the majority of English people worked in the countryside economy that fed the country's towns and cities and supported an extensive international trade. Across much of England, production was organised around manors, controlled by local lords – including the gentry and the Church – and governed through a system of manorial courts. Some of the population were unfree serfs, who had to work on their lords' lands for a period of time each year, though the balance of free and unfree varied across England, and in the south-east serfdom was relatively rare. Some serfs were born unfree and could not leave their manors to work elsewhere without the consent of the local lord; others accepted limitations on their freedom as part of the tenure agreement for their farmland. Population growth led to pressure on the available agricultural land, increasing the power of local landowners.

In 1348 a plague known as the Black Death crossed from mainland Europe into England, rapidly killing an estimated 50 percent of the population. After an initial period of economic shock, England began to adapt to the changed economic situation. The death rate among the peasantry meant that suddenly land was relatively plentiful and labourers in much shorter supply. Labourers could charge more for their work and, in the consequent competition for labour, wages were driven sharply upwards. In turn, the profits of landowners were eroded. The trading, commercial and financial networks in the towns disintegrated.

The authorities responded to the chaos by passing emergency legislation, the Ordinance of Labourers in 1349, and the Statute of Labourers in 1351. These attempted to fix wages at pre-plague levels, making it a crime to refuse work or to break an existing contract, imposing fines on those who transgressed. The system was initially enforced through special Justices of Labourers and then, from the 1360s onwards, through the normal Justices of the Peace, typically members of the local gentry. Although in theory these laws applied to both labourers seeking higher wages and to employers tempted to outbid their competitors for workers, they were in practice applied only to labourers, and then in a rather arbitrary fashion. The legislation was strengthened in 1361, with the penalties increased to include branding and imprisonment. The royal government had not intervened in this way before, nor allied itself with the local landowners in quite such an obvious or unpopular way.

Over the next few decades, economic opportunities increased for the English peasantry. Some labourers took up specialist jobs that would have previously been barred to them, and others moved from employer to employer, or became servants in richer households. These changes were keenly felt across the south-east of England, where the London market created a wide range of opportunities for farmers and artisans. Local lords had the right to prevent serfs from leaving their manors, but when serfs found themselves blocked in the manorial courts, many simply left to work illegally on manors elsewhere. Wages continued to rise, and between the 1340s and the 1380s the purchasing power of rural labourers increased by around 40 percent. As the wealth of the lower classes increased, Parliament brought in fresh laws in 1363 to prevent them from consuming expensive goods formerly only affordable by the elite. These sumptuary laws proved unenforceable, but the wider labour laws continued to be firmly applied.

=== War and finance ===
Another factor in the revolt of 1381 was the conduct of the war with France. In 1337 Edward III of England pressed his claims to the French throne, beginning a long-running conflict that became known as the Hundred Years' War. Edward had initial successes, but his campaigns were not decisive. Charles V of France became more active in the conflict after 1369, taking advantage of his country's greater economic strength to commence cross-Channel raids on England. By the 1370s, England's armies on the continent were under huge military and financial pressure; the garrisons in Calais and Brest alone, for example, were costing £36,000 a year to maintain (£21,680,569.06 as of 2026), while military expeditions could consume £50,000 in only six months (£30,111,901.48 as of 2026). (Note: It is impossible to accurately compare 14th century and modern prices or incomes. For comparison, the income of a typical nobleman such as Richard le Scrope was around £600 a year, while only six earls in the kingdom enjoyed incomes of over £5,000 a year (£3,011,190.15 as of 2026).) Edward died in 1377, leaving the throne to his grandson, Richard II, then only ten years old.

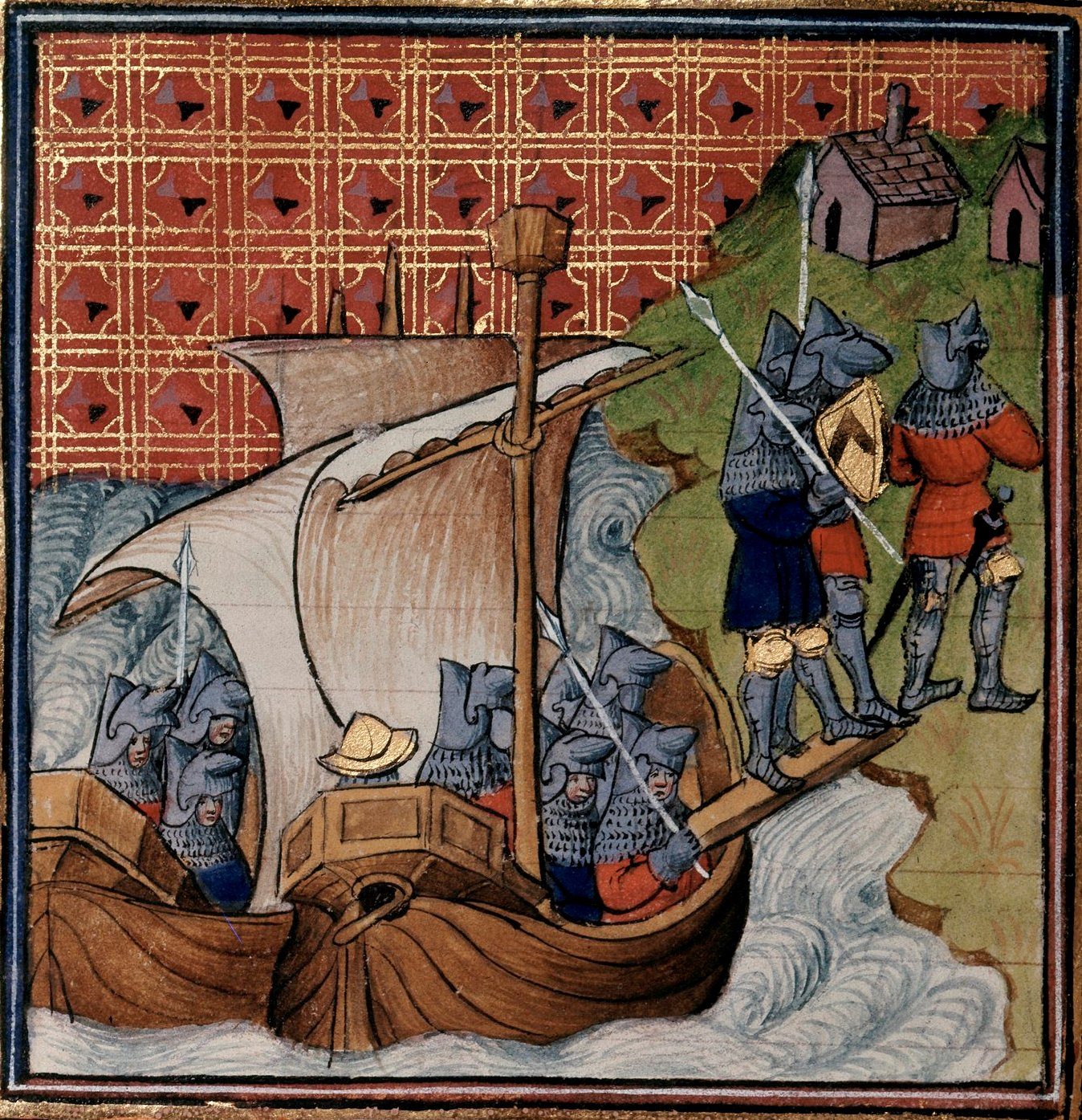
English soldiers landing in Normandy, c. 1380–1400, during the Hundred Years' War

Richard's government was formed around his uncles, most prominently the rich and powerful John of Gaunt, and many of his grandfather's former senior officials. They faced the challenge of financially sustaining the war in France. Taxes in the 14th century were raised on an ad hoc basis through Parliament, then comprising the Lords, the titled aristocracy and clergy; and the Commons, the representatives of the knights, merchants and senior gentry from across England. These taxes were typically imposed on a household's movable possessions, such as their goods or stock. The raising of these taxes affected the members of the Commons much more than the Lords. To complicate matters, the official statistics used to administer the taxes pre-dated the Black Death and, since the size and wealth of local communities had changed greatly since the plague, effective collection had become increasingly difficult.

Just before Edward's death, Parliament introduced a new form of taxation called the poll tax, which was levied at the rate of four pence on every person over the age of 14, with a deduction for married couples. (Note: For comparison, the wage for an unskilled labourer in Essex in 1380 was around three pence a day.) Designed to spread the cost of the war over a broader economic base than previous tax levies, this round of taxation proved extremely unpopular but raised £22,000. (£13,249,236.65 as of 2026) The war continued to go badly and, despite raising some money through forced loans, the Crown returned to Parliament in 1379 to request further funds. The Commons were supportive of the young King, but had concerns about the amounts of money being sought and the way this was being spent by the King's counsellors, whom they suspected of corruption. A second poll tax was approved, this time with a sliding scale of taxes against seven different classes of English society, with the upper classes paying more in absolute terms. Widespread evasion proved to be a problem, and the tax only raised £18,600 – far short of the £50,000 that had been hoped for.

In November 1380, Parliament was called together again in Northampton. Archbishop Simon Sudbury, the new Lord Chancellor, updated the Commons on the worsening situation in France, a collapse in international trade, and the risk of the Crown having to default on its debts. The Commons were told that the colossal sum of £160,000 was now required in new taxes, and arguments ensued between the royal council and Parliament about what to do next. Parliament passed a third poll tax (this time on a flat-rate basis of 12 pence on each person over 15, with no allowance made for married couples) which they estimated would raise £66,666. The third poll tax was highly unpopular and many in the south-east evaded it by refusing to register. The royal council appointed new commissioners in March 1381 to interrogate local village and town officials in an attempt to find those who were refusing to comply. The extraordinary powers and interference of these teams of investigators in local communities, primarily in the south-east and east of England, raised still further the tensions surrounding the taxes.

=== Protest and authority ===
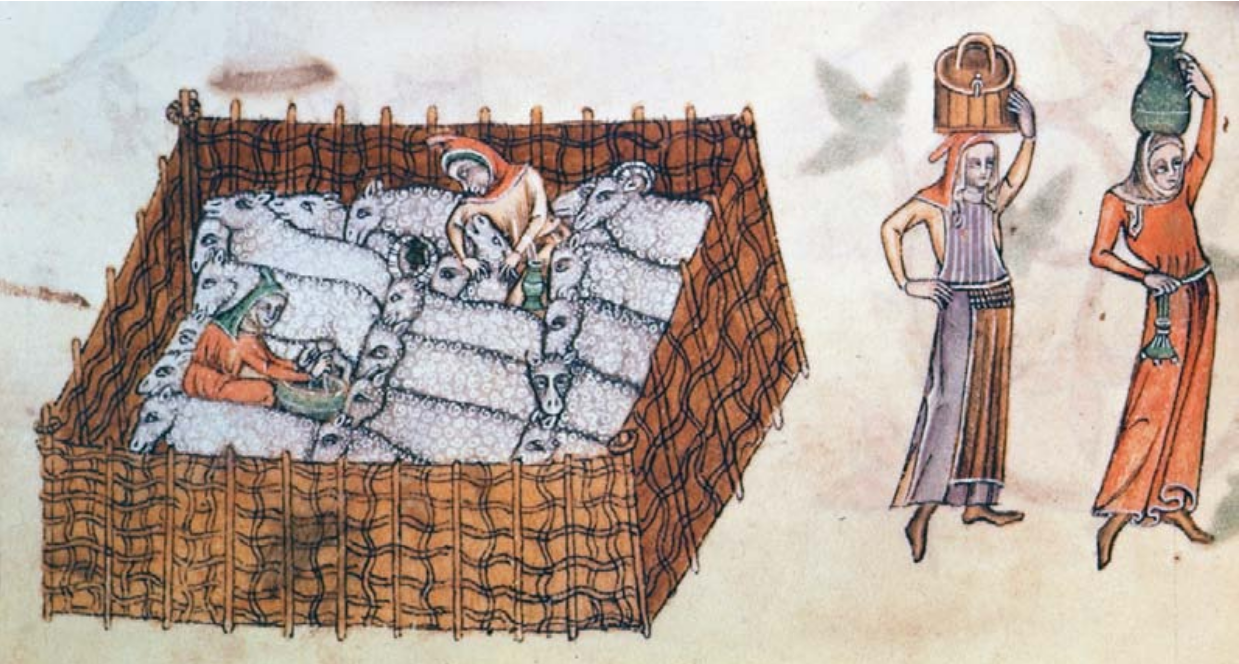
Sheep farming, from the Luttrell Psalter, c. 1320–1340

...from the beginning all men by nature were created alike...

— John Ball, 1381

The decades running up to 1381 were a rebellious, troubled period. London was a particular focus of unrest, and the activities of the city's politically active guilds and fraternities often alarmed the authorities. Londoners resented the expansion of the royal legal system in the capital, in particular the increased role of the Marshalsea Court in Southwark, which had begun to compete with the city authorities for judicial power in London. (Note: The Marshalsea Court was originally intended to provide justice for the royal household and those doing business with it, travelling with the King around the country and having authority covering 12 miles (19 km) around the monarch. The monarchs of the 14th century were increasingly based in London, resulting in the Marshalsea Court establishing a semi-permanent presence in the capital. Successive monarchs used the court to exercise royal power, often at the expense of the City of London's Corporation.) The city's population also resented the presence of foreigners, Flemish weavers in particular. Londoners detested John of Gaunt because he was a supporter of the religious reformer John Wycliffe, whom the London public regarded as a heretic. John of Gaunt was also engaged in a feud with the London elite and was rumoured to be planning to replace the elected mayor with a captain, appointed by the Crown. This led to riots in 1377. The London elite were themselves fighting out a vicious internal battle for political power. As a result, in 1381 the ruling classes in London were unstable and divided.

Rural communities, particularly in the south-east, were unhappy with the operation of serfdom and the use of the local manorial courts to exact traditional fines and levies, not least because the same landowners who ran these courts also often acted as enforcers of the unpopular labour laws or as royal judges. Many of the village elites refused to take up positions in local government and began to frustrate the operation of the courts. Animals seized by the courts began to be retaken by their owners, and legal officials were assaulted. Some started to advocate the creation of independent village communities, respecting traditional laws but separate from the hated legal system centred in London. As the historian Miri Rubin describes, for many, "the problem was not the country's laws, but those charged with applying and safeguarding them."

Concerns were raised about these changes in society. William Langland wrote the poem Piers Plowman in the years before 1380, praising peasants who respected the law and worked hard for their lords, but complaining about greedy, travelling labourers demanding higher wages. The poet John Gower warned against a future revolt in both Mirour de l'Omme and Vox Clamantis. There was a moral panic about the threat posed by newly arrived workers in the towns and the possibility that servants might turn against their masters. New legislation was introduced in 1359 to deal with migrants, existing conspiracy laws were more widely applied and the treason laws were extended to include servants or wives who betrayed their masters and husbands. By the 1370s, there were fears that if the French invaded England, the rural classes might side with the invaders.

The discontent began to give way to open protest. In 1377, the "Great Rumour" occurred in south-east and south-west England. Rural workers organised themselves and refused to work for their lords, arguing that, according to the Domesday Book, they were exempted from such requests. The workers made unsuccessful appeals to the law courts and the King. There were also widespread urban tensions, particularly in London, where John of Gaunt narrowly escaped being lynched. The troubles increased again in 1380, with protests and disturbances across northern England and in the western towns of Shrewsbury and Bridgwater. An uprising occurred in York, during which John de Gisborne, the city's mayor, was removed from office, and fresh tax riots followed in early 1381. There was a great storm in England during May 1381, which many felt to prophesy future change and upheaval, adding further to the disturbed mood.

== Events ==
=== Overview ===
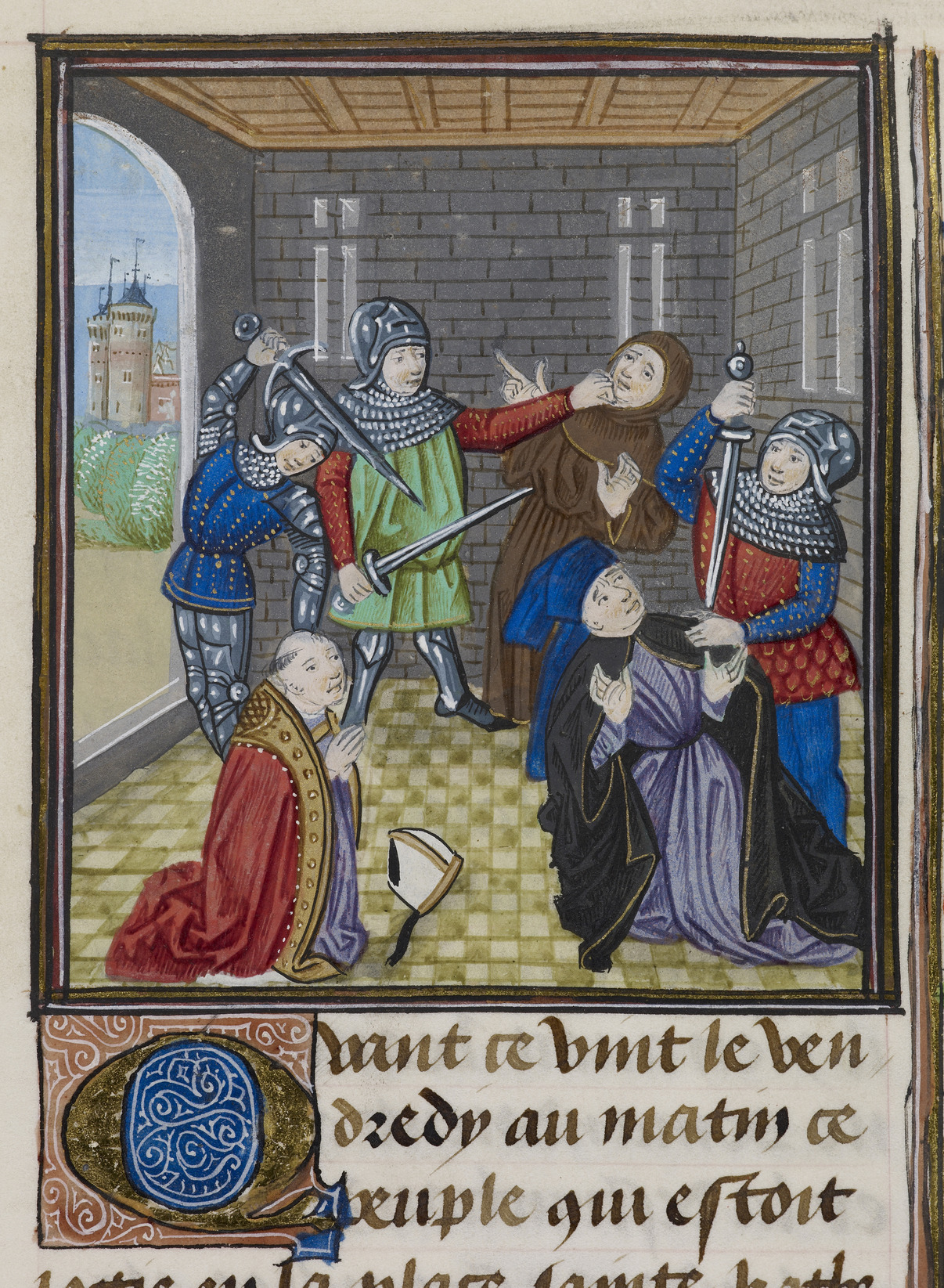
15th-century depiction of Sudbury and Hales' murders

The final trigger for the revolt was the intervention of a royal official, John Bampton, in Essex on 30 May 1381. His attempts to collect unpaid poll taxes in Brentwood ended in a violent confrontation, which rapidly spread across the southeast of the country. A wide spectrum of rural society, including many local artisans and village officials, rose up in protest, burning court records and opening the local prisons. The rebels sought a reduction in taxation, an end to serfdom, and the removal of King Richard II's senior officials and law courts.

Inspired by the sermons of the radical cleric John Ball and led by Wat Tyler, a contingent of Kentish rebels advanced on London. They were met at Blackheath by representatives of the royal government, aldermen John Horn, Adam Karlille and John Frosh, who unsuccessfully attempted to persuade them to return home. King Richard, then aged 14, retreated to the safety of the Tower of London, but most of the royal forces were abroad or in northern England. On 13 June, the rebels entered London and, joined by many local townsfolk, attacked the prisons, destroyed the Savoy Palace, set fire to law books and buildings in the Temple, and killed anyone associated with the royal government. The following day, Richard met the rebels at Mile End and agreed to most of their demands, including the abolition of serfdom. Meanwhile, rebels entered the Tower of London, killing Lord Chancellor Simon Sudbury and Lord High Treasurer Robert Hales, whom they found inside.

On 15 June, Richard left the city to meet Tyler and the rebels at Smithfield. Violence broke out, and Richard's party killed Tyler. Richard defused the tense situation long enough for London's mayor, William Walworth, to gather a militia from the city and disperse the rebel forces. Richard immediately began to re-establish order in London and rescinded his previous grants to the rebels. The revolt had also spread into East Anglia, where the University of Cambridge was attacked and many royal officials were killed. Unrest continued until the intervention of Henry Despenser, who defeated a rebel army at the Battle of North Walsham on 25 or 26 June. Troubles extended north to York, Beverley, and Scarborough, and as far west as Bridgwater in Somerset. Richard mobilised 4,000 soldiers to restore order. Most of the rebel leaders were tracked down and executed; by November, at least 1,500 rebels had been killed.

=== Outbreak of the revolt ===
==== Essex and Kent ====
The revolt of 1381 broke out in Essex, following the arrival of John Bampton to investigate non-payment of the poll tax on 30 May. Bampton was a Member of Parliament, a Justice of the Peace and well-connected with royal circles. He based himself in Brentwood and summoned representatives from the neighbouring villages of Corringham, Fobbing and Stanford-le-Hope to explain and make good the shortfalls on 1 June. The villagers appear to have arrived well-organised, and armed with old bows and sticks. Bampton first interrogated the people of Fobbing, whose representative, Thomas Baker, declared that his village had already paid their taxes, and that no more money would be forthcoming. When Bampton and two sergeants attempted to arrest Baker, violence broke out. Bampton escaped and retreated to London, but three of his clerks and several of the Brentwood townsfolk who had agreed to act as jurors were killed. Robert Bealknap, the Chief Justice of the Court of Common Pleas, who was probably already holding court in the area, was empowered to arrest and deal with the perpetrators.

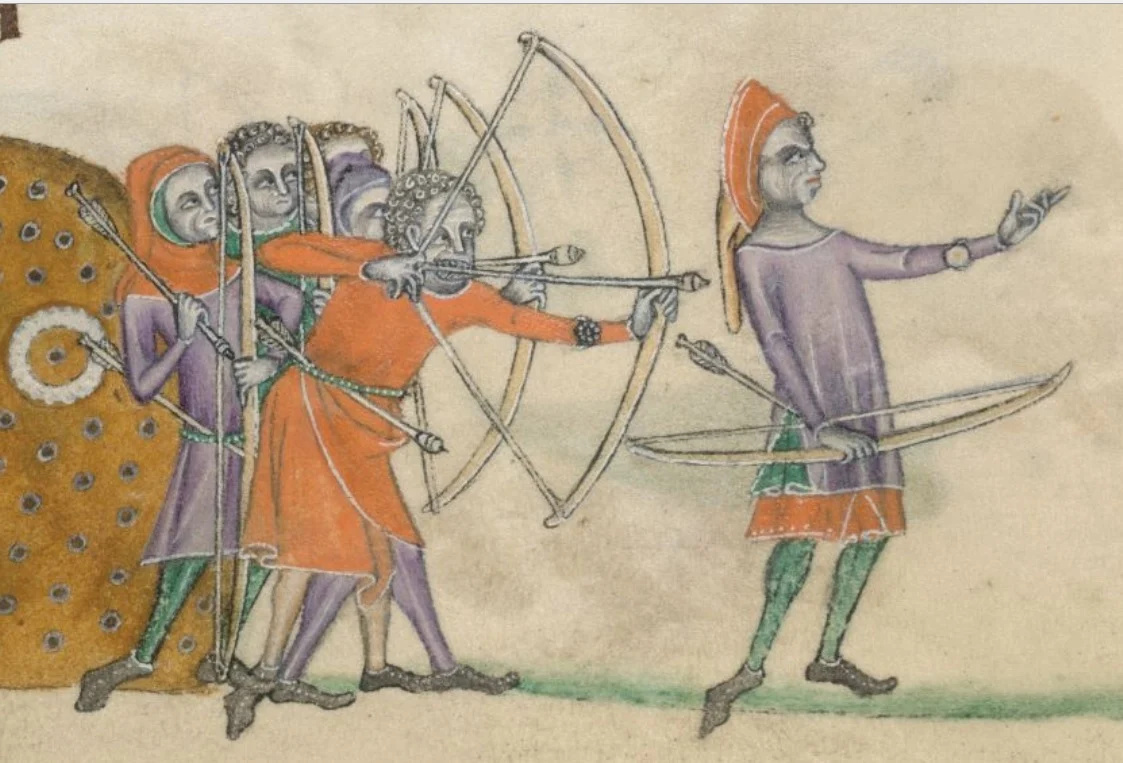
Peasant longbowmen at practice, from the Luttrell Psalter, c. 1320–1340

By the next day, the revolt was rapidly growing. The villagers spread the news across the region and John Geoffrey, a local bailiff, rode between Brentwood and Chelmsford, rallying support. On 4 June, the rebels gathered at Bocking, where their future plans seem to have been discussed. The Essex rebels, possibly a few thousand strong, advanced towards London, some probably travelling directly and others via Kent. One group, under the leadership of John Wrawe, a former chaplain, marched north towards the neighbouring county of Suffolk, with the intention of raising a revolt there.

Revolt also flared in neighbouring Kent. Sir Simon de Burley, a close associate of both Edward III and the young Richard, had claimed that a man in Kent, called Robert Belling, was an escaped serf from one of his estates. Burley sent two sergeants to Gravesend, where Belling was living, to reclaim him. Gravesend's local bailiffs and Belling tried to negotiate a solution under which Burley would accept a sum of money in return for dropping his case, but this failed and Belling was taken away to be imprisoned at Rochester Castle. A furious group of local people gathered at Dartford, possibly on 5 June, to discuss the matter. From there the rebels travelled to Maidstone, where they stormed the prison, and then on to Rochester on 6 June. Faced by the angry crowds, the constable in charge of Rochester Castle surrendered it without a fight and Belling was freed.

Some of the Kentish crowds now dispersed, but others continued. From this point, they appear to have been led by Wat Tyler, whom the Anonimalle Chronicle suggests was elected their leader at a large gathering at Maidstone on 7 June. Relatively little is known about Tyler's former life; chroniclers suggest that he was from Essex, had served in France as an archer, and was a charismatic and capable leader. Several chroniclers believe that he was responsible for shaping the political aims of the revolt. Some also mention a Jack Straw as a leader among the Kentish rebels during this phase in the revolt, but it is unclear if this was a real person, or a pseudonym for Wat Tyler or John Wrawe. (Note: Walsingham highlights the role of a "Jack Straw", and is supported by Froissart, although Knighton argues that this was a pseudonym; other chroniclers fail to mention him at all. The historian Friedrich Brie popularised the argument in favour of the pseudonym in 1906. Modern historians recognise Tyler as the primary leader, and are doubtful about the role of "Jack Straw".)

Tyler and the Kentish men advanced to Canterbury, entering the walled city and castle without resistance on 10 June. The rebels deposed the absent Archbishop of Canterbury, Sudbury, and made the cathedral monks swear loyalty to their cause. They attacked properties in the city with links to the hated royal council, and searched the city for suspected enemies, dragging the suspects out of their houses and executing them. The city prison was opened and the prisoners freed. Tyler then persuaded a few thousand of the rebels to leave Canterbury and advance with him on London the next morning.

==== March on the capital ====
15th-century representation of the cleric John Ball encouraging the rebels; Wat Tyler is shown in red, front left

The Kentish advance on London appears to have been coordinated with the movement of the rebels in Essex, Suffolk and Norfolk. Their forces were armed with weapons including sticks, battle axes, old swords and bows. (Note: Military historian Jonathan Sumption considers this description of the rebels' weaponry, drawn from the chronicler Thomas Walsingham, as reliable; literary historian Stephen Justice is less certain, noting the sarcastic manner in which Walsingham mocks the rebels' old and dilapidated arms, including their bows "reddened with age and smoke.") Along their way, they encountered Lady Joan, the King's mother, who was travelling back to the capital to avoid being caught up in the revolt; she was mocked but otherwise left unharmed. The Kentish rebels reached Blackheath, just south-east of the capital, on 12 June. (Note: Historian Andrew Prescott has critiqued these timings, arguing that it would have been unlikely that so many rebels could have advanced so fast on London, given the condition of the medieval road networks.)

Word of the revolt reached the King at Windsor Castle on the night of 10 June. He travelled by boat down the River Thames to London the next day, taking up residence in the powerful fortress of the Tower of London for safety, where he was joined by his mother, Archbishop Sudbury, the Lord High Treasurer Sir Robert Hales, the Earls of Arundel, Salisbury and Warwick and several other senior nobles. A delegation, headed by Thomas Brinton, the Bishop of Rochester, was sent out from London to negotiate with the rebels and persuade them to return home.

At Blackheath, John Ball gave a famous sermon to the assembled Kentishmen. Ball was a well-known priest and radical preacher from Kent, who was by now closely associated with Tyler. Chroniclers' accounts vary as to how he came to be involved in the revolt; he may have been released from Maidstone prison by the crowds, or might have been already at liberty when the revolt broke out. Ball rhetorically asked the crowds "When Adam delved and Eve span, who was then a gentleman?" and promoted the rebel slogan "With King Richard and the true commons of England." The phrases emphasised the rebel opposition to the continuation of serfdom and to the hierarchies of the Church and State that separated the subject from the King, while stressing that they were loyal to the monarchy and, unlike the King's advisers, were "true" to Richard. The rebels rejected proposals from the Bishop of Rochester that they should return home, and instead prepared to march on.

Discussions took place in the Tower of London about how to deal with the revolt. The King had few troops at hand, in the form of the castle's garrison, his immediate bodyguard and, at most, several hundred soldiers. (Note: Chronicler figures for the King's immediate forces in London vary; Henry Knighton argues that the King had between 150–180 men in the Tower of London, Thomas Walsingham suggests 1,200. These were probably over-estimates, and historian Alastair Dunn assesses that only a skeleton force was present; Jonathan Sumption judges that around 150 men-at-arms were present, and some archers.) Many of the more experienced military commanders were overseas, and the nearest major military force was in northern England, guarding against a potential Scottish invasion. Resistance in the provinces was also complicated by English law, which stated that only the King could summon local militias or lawfully execute rebels and criminals, leaving many local lords unwilling to attempt to suppress the uprisings on their own authority.

Since the Blackheath negotiations had failed, the decision was taken that the King himself should meet the rebels, at Greenwich, on the south side of the Thames. Guarded by four barges of soldiers, Richard sailed from the Tower on the morning of 13 June, where he was met on the other side by the rebel crowds. The negotiations failed, as Richard was unwilling to come ashore and the rebels refused to enter discussions until he did. Richard returned across the river to the Tower.

=== Events in London ===
==== Entry to the city ====
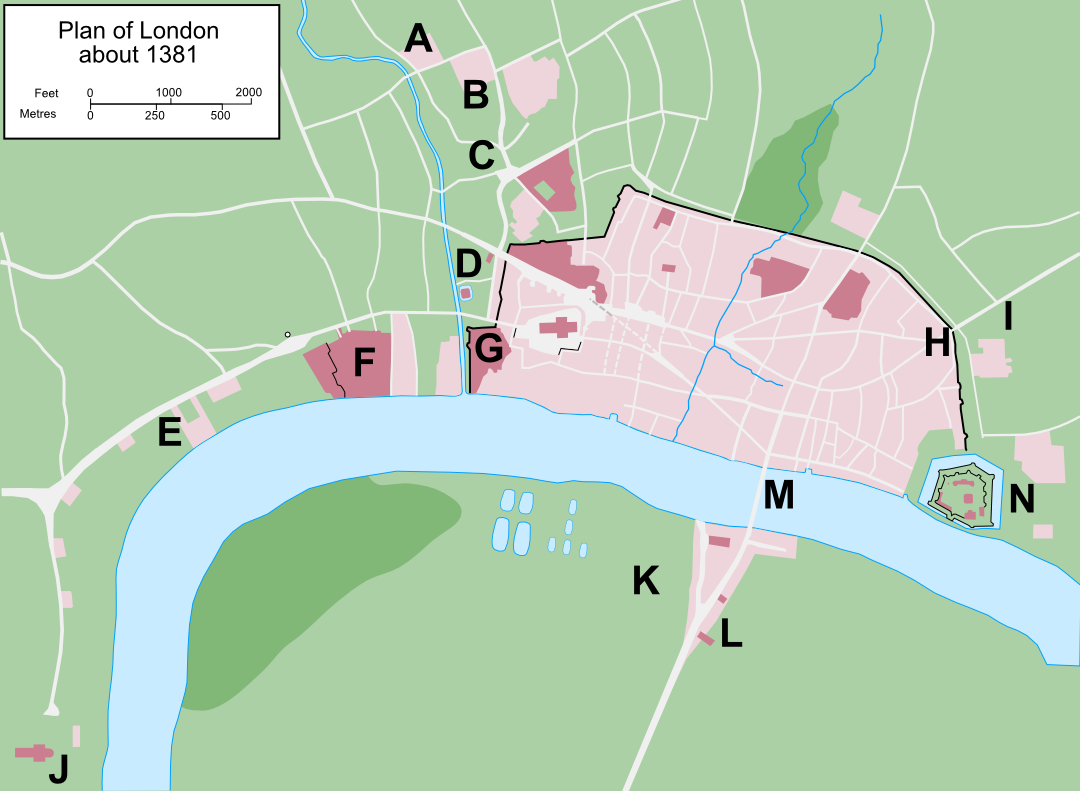
Map of London in 1381: A – Clerkenwell; B – Priory of St. John; C – Smithfield; D – Newgate and Fleet Prisons; E – The Savoy Palace; F – The Temple; G – Black Friars; H – Aldgate; I – Mile End; J – Westminster; K – Southwark; L – Marshalsea Prison; M – London Bridge; N – Tower of London

The rebels began crossing from Southwark onto London Bridge on the afternoon of 13 June. The defences on London Bridge were opened from the inside, either in sympathy for the rebel cause or out of fear, and the rebels advanced into the city. (Note: It is uncertain who opened the defences at London Bridge and Aldgate. After the revolt, three aldermen, John Horn, Walter Sibil and William Tongue, were put on trial by the authorities, but it is unclear to what extent these accusations were motivated by the post-conflict London politics. The historian Nigel Saul is doubtful of their guilt in collaborating with the rebels. Rodney Hilton suggests that they may have opened the gates to buy time and prevent the destruction of their city, although he prefers the theory that the London crowds forced the gates to be opened. Jonathan Sumption similarly argues that the aldermen were forced to open the gates in the face of popular pressure.) At the same time, the rebel force from Essex made its way towards Aldgate on the north side of the city. The rebels swept west through the city centre, and Aldgate was opened to let in the rest of the rebels.

The Kentish rebels had assembled a wide-ranging list of people whom they wanted the King to hand over for execution. It included national figures, such as John of Gaunt, Archbishop Sudbury and Hales; other key members of the royal council; officials, such as Belknap and Bampton who had intervened in Kent; and other hated members of the wider royal circle. When they reached the Marshalsea Prison in Southwark, they tore it apart. By now the Kent and Essex rebels had been joined by many rebellious Londoners. The Fleet and Newgate Prisons were attacked by the crowds, and the rebels also targeted houses belonging to Flemish immigrants.

On the north side of London, the rebels approached Smithfield and Clerkenwell Priory, the headquarters of the Knights Hospitaller, which was headed by Hales. The priory was destroyed, along with the nearby manor. Heading west along Fleet Street, the rebels attacked the Temple, a complex of legal buildings and offices owned by the Hospitallers. The contents, books and paperwork were brought out and burned in the street, and the buildings were systematically demolished. Meanwhile, John Fordham, the Keeper of the Privy Seal and one of the men on the rebels' execution list, narrowly escaped when the crowds ransacked his accommodation but failed to notice that he was still in the building.

Next to be attacked along Fleet Street was the Savoy Palace, a huge, luxurious building belonging to John of Gaunt. According to the chronicler Henry Knighton it contained "such quantities of vessels and silver plate, without counting the parcel-gilt and solid gold, that five carts would hardly suffice to carry them"; official estimates placed the value at around £10,000. The interior was systematically destroyed by the rebels, who burnt the soft furnishings, smashed the precious metal work, crushed the gems, set fire to the Duke's records and threw the remains into the Thames and the city drains. Almost nothing was stolen by the rebels, who declared themselves to be "zealots for truth and justice, not thieves and robbers". The remains of the building were then set alight. In the evening, rebel forces gathered outside the Tower of London, from where the King watched the fires burning across the city.

==== Taking the Tower of London ====
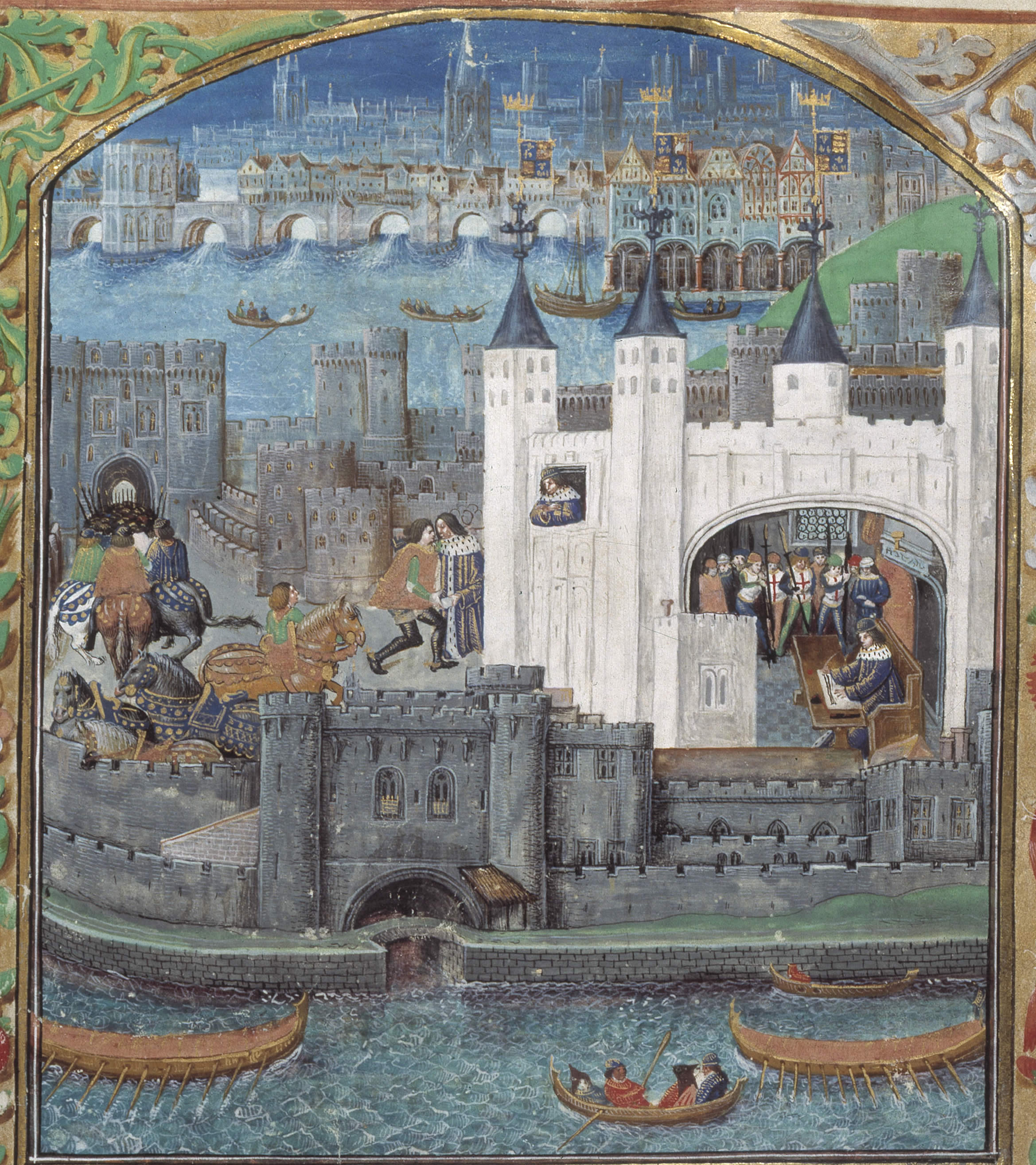
Late 15th-century depiction of the Tower of London and its keep, the White Tower. Old London Bridge is visible in the background.

On the morning of 14 June, the crowd continued west along the Thames, burning the houses of officials around Westminster and opening the Westminster prison. They then moved back into central London, setting fire to more buildings and storming Newgate Prison. The hunt for Flemings continued, and those with Flemish-sounding accents were killed, including the royal adviser, Richard Lyons. (Note: The royal adviser Richard Lyons was believed to have Flemish origins, although he was also unpopular in his own right as a result of his role in government.) In one city ward, the bodies of 40 executed Flemings were piled up in the street, and at the Church of St Martin Vintry, popular with the Flemish, 35 of the community were killed. Historian Rodney Hilton argues that these attacks may have been coordinated by the weavers' guilds of London, who were commercial competitors of the Flemish weavers.

Isolated inside the Tower, the royal government was in a state of shock at the turn of events. The King left the castle that morning and made his way to negotiate with the rebels at Mile End in east London, taking only a very small bodyguard with him. The King left Sudbury and Hales behind in the Tower, either for their own safety or because Richard had decided it would be safer to distance himself from his unpopular ministers. Along the way, several Londoners accosted the King to complain about alleged injustices.

It is uncertain who spoke for the rebels at Mile End, and Wat Tyler may not have been present on this occasion, but they appear to have put forward their various demands to the King, including the surrender of the hated officials on their lists for execution; the abolition of serfdom and unfree tenure; "that there should be no law within the realm save the law of Winchester", and a general amnesty for the rebels. It is unclear precisely what was meant by the law of Winchester, but it probably referred to the rebel ideal of self-regulating village communities. (Note: The rebel call for a return to the "law of Winchester" has been much debated. One theory is that it was another term for the Domesday Book of William I, which was believed to protect particular groups of tenants. Another is that it referred to the Statute of Winchester in 1285, which allowed for the enforcement of local law by armed village communities and had been cited in more recent criminal law legislation. The creation of special justices and royal officials during the 14th century was seen as eroding these principles.) Richard issued charters announcing the abolition of serfdom, which immediately began to be disseminated around the country. He declined to hand over any of his officials, apparently instead promising that he would personally implement any justice that was required.

While Richard was at Mile End, the Tower was taken by the rebels. This force, separate from those operating under Tyler at Mile End, approached the castle, possibly in the late morning. (Note: Most chroniclers stated that the force that attacked the Tower of London was separate to that operating under Tyler's command at Mile End; only the Anonimalle Chronicle links them to Tyler. The timing of the late morning attack relies on the account of the Westminster Chronicle.) The gates were open to receive Richard on his return and a crowd of around 400 rebels entered the fortress, encountering no resistance, possibly because the guards were terrified by them.

Once inside, the rebels began to hunt down their key targets, and found Archbishop Sudbury and Robert Hales in the chapel of the White Tower. Along with William Appleton, John of Gaunt's physician, and John Legge, a royal sergeant, they were taken out to Tower Hill and beheaded. Their heads were paraded around the city, before being affixed to London Bridge. The rebels found John of Gaunt's son, the future Henry IV, and were about to execute him as well, when John Ferrour, one of the royal guards, successfully interceded on his behalf. The rebels also discovered Lady Joan and Joan Holland, Richard's sister, in the castle but let them go unharmed after making fun of them. The castle was thoroughly looted of armour and royal paraphernalia.

In the aftermath of the attack, Richard did not return to the Tower but instead travelled from Mile End to the Great Wardrobe, one of his royal houses in Blackfriars, part of south-west London. There he appointed the military commander Richard FitzAlan, the Earl of Arundel, to replace Sudbury as Chancellor, and began to make plans to regain an advantage over the rebels the following day. Many of the Essex rebels now began to disperse, content with the King's promises, leaving Tyler and the Kentish forces the most significant faction in London. Tyler's men moved around the city that evening, seeking out and killing John of Gaunt's employees, foreigners and anyone associated with the legal system.

==== Smithfield ====
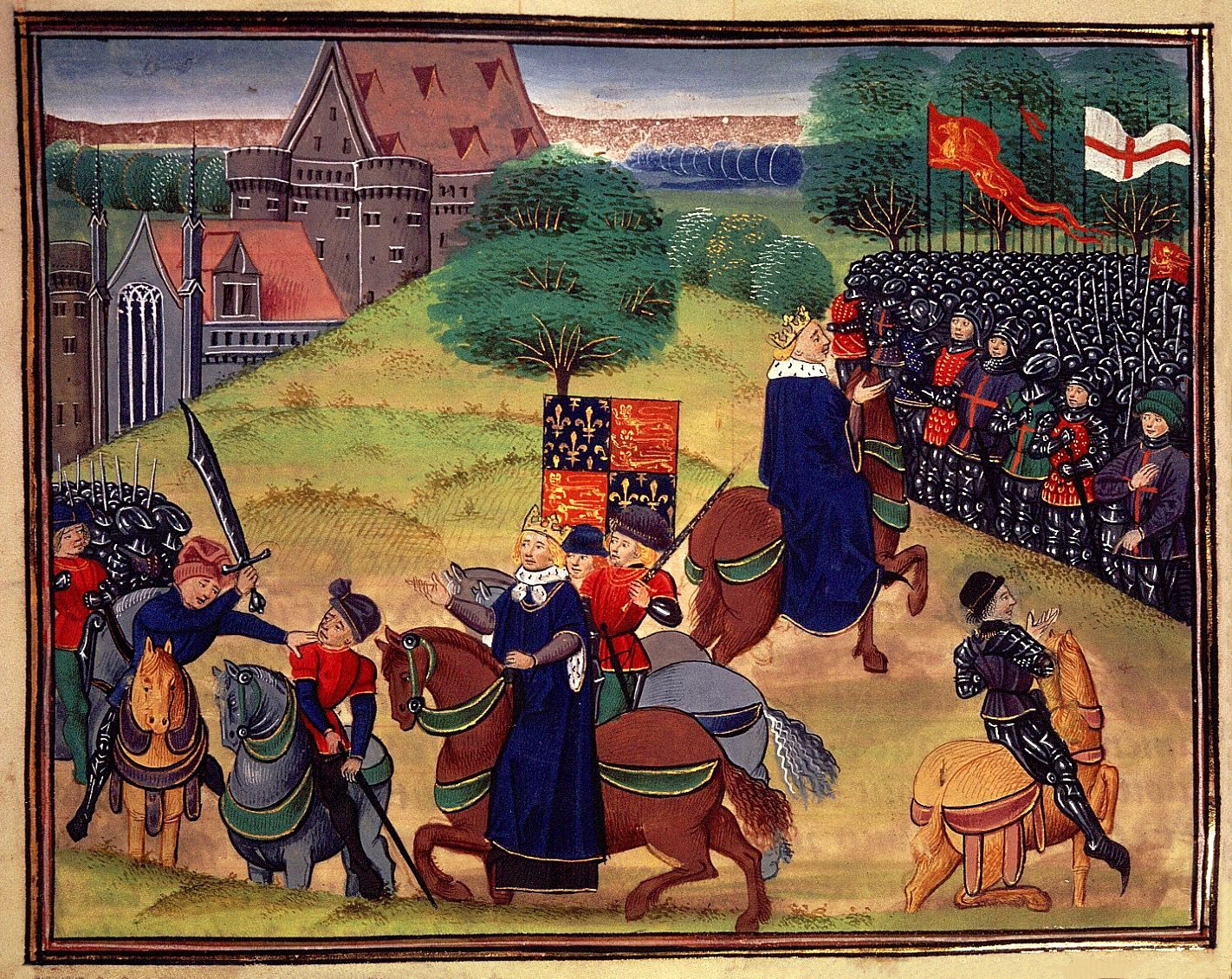
Late 14th-century depiction of William Walworth killing Wat Tyler; the King is represented twice, watching events unfold (left) and addressing the crowd (right). British Library, London.

On 15 June the royal government and the remaining rebels, who were unsatisfied with the charters granted the previous day, agreed to meet at Smithfield, just outside the city walls. London remained in confusion, with various bands of rebels roaming the city independently. Richard prayed at Westminster Abbey, before setting out for the meeting in the late afternoon. The chroniclers' accounts of the encounter all vary on matters of detail, but agree on the broad sequence of events. The King and his party, at least 200 strong and including men-at-arms, positioned themselves outside St Bartholomew's Priory to the east of Smithfield, and the thousands of rebels massed along the western end. (Note: The primary sources for the events at Smithfield are the Anonimalle Chronicle, Thomas Walsingham, Jean Froissart, Henry Knighton and the Westminster Chronicler. There are minor differences in their accounts of events. Froissart suggests that Wat Tyler intended to capture the King and kill the royal party, and that he initiated the engagement with Richard to carry out this plan. The Anonimalle Chronicle and Walsingham both go into some, if varying, detail as to the rebels' demands. Walsingham and Knighton wrote that Tyler, rather than being about to depart at the end of his discussions with Richard, appeared to be about to kill the King, triggering the royal response. Walsingham differs from the other chroniclers in giving a key role in the early part of the encounter to Sir John Newton.)

Richard probably called Tyler forwards from the crowd to meet him, and Tyler greeted the King with what the royal party considered excessive familiarity, terming Richard his "brother" and promising him his friendship. Richard queried why Tyler and the rebels had not yet left London following the signing of the charters the previous day, but this brought an angry rebuke from Tyler, who requested that a further charter be drawn up. The rebel leader rudely demanded refreshment and, once this had been provided, attempted to leave.

An argument then broke out between Tyler and some of the royal servants. The Lord Mayor of London, William Walworth, stepped forward to intervene; Tyler made some motion towards the King, and the royal soldiers leapt in. Either Walworth or Richard ordered Tyler to be arrested, Tyler attempted to attack the Mayor, and Walworth responded by stabbing Tyler. Ralph Standish, a royal squire, then repeatedly stabbed Tyler with his sword, mortally injuring him.

The situation was now precarious, and violence appeared likely as the rebels prepared to unleash a volley of arrows. Richard rode forward towards the crowd and persuaded them to follow him away from Smithfield, to Clerkenwell Fields, defusing the situation. Walworth meanwhile began to regain control of the situation, backed by reinforcements from the city. Tyler's head was cut off and displayed on a pole and, with their leader dead and the royal government now backed by the London militia, the rebel movement began to collapse. Richard promptly knighted Walworth and his leading supporters for their services.

=== Wider revolt ===
==== Eastern England ====
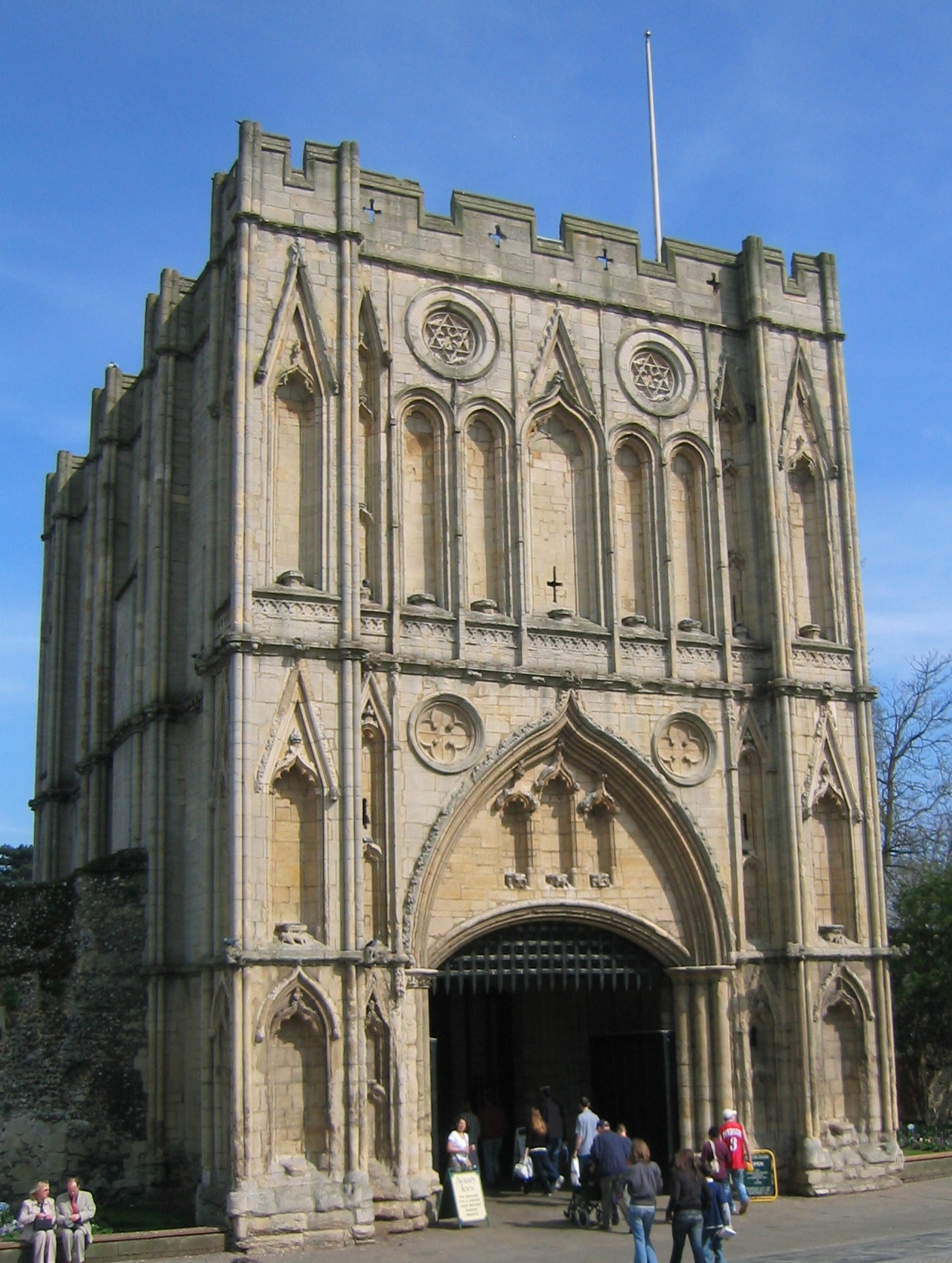
The Abbey Gate of Bury St Edmunds Abbey, stormed by the rebels on 13 June

While the revolt was unfolding in London, John Wrawe led his force into Suffolk. Wrawe had considerable influence over the development of the revolt across eastern England, where there may have been almost as many rebels as in the London revolt. The authorities put up very little resistance to the revolt: the major nobles failed to organise defences, key fortifications fell easily to the rebels and the local militias were not mobilised. As in London and the south-east, this was in part due to the absence of key military leaders and the nature of English law, but any locally recruited men might also have proved unreliable in the face of a popular uprising.

On 12 June, Wrawe attacked Sir Richard Lyons' property at Overhall, advancing on to Cavendish and Bury St Edmunds in west Suffolk the next day, gathering further support as they went. John Cambridge, the Prior of the wealthy Bury St Edmunds Abbey, was disliked in the town, and Wrawe allied himself with the townspeople and stormed the abbey. The Prior escaped, but was found two days later and beheaded. A small band of rebels marched north to Thetford to extort protection money from the town, and another group tracked down Sir John Cavendish, the Chief Justice of the King's Bench and Chancellor of the University of Cambridge. Cavendish was caught in Lakenheath and killed. John Battisford and Thomas Sampson independently led a revolt near Ipswich on 14 June. They took the town without opposition and looted the properties of the archdeacon and local tax officials. The violence spread out further, with attacks on many properties and the burning of the local court records. One official, Edmund Lakenheath, was forced to flee from the Suffolk coast by boat.

Revolt began to stir in St Albans in Hertfordshire late on 13 June, when news broke of the events in London. There had been long-running disagreements in St Albans between the town and the local abbey, which had extensive privileges in the region. On 14 June, protesters met with the Abbot, Thomas de la Mare, and demanded their freedom from the abbey. A group of townsmen under the leadership of William Grindecobbe travelled to London, where they appealed to the King for the rights of the abbey to be abolished. Wat Tyler, then still in control of the city, granted them authority in the meantime to take direct action against the abbey. Grindecobbe and the rebels returned to St Albans, where they found the Prior had already fled. The rebels broke open the abbey prison, destroyed the fences marking out the abbey lands and burnt the abbey records in the town square. They then forced Thomas de la Mare to surrender the abbey's rights in a charter on 16 June. The revolt against the abbey spread out over the next few days, with abbey property and financial records being destroyed across the county.

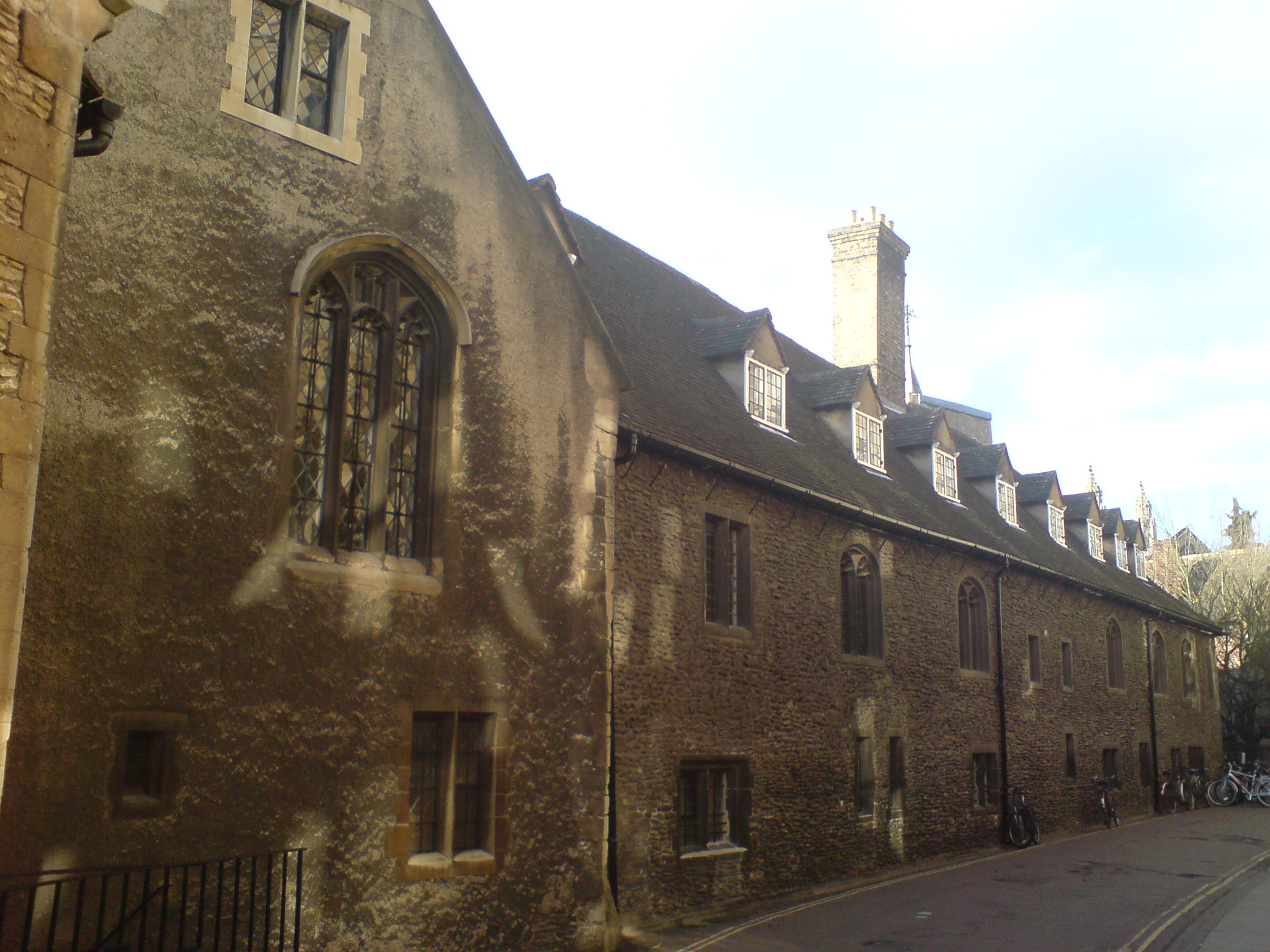
Corpus Christi College's Old Court, attacked by the rebels on 15 June

On 15 June, a revolt broke out in Cambridgeshire, led by elements of Wrawe's Suffolk rebellion and some local men, such as John Greyston, who had been involved in the events in London and had returned to his home county to spread the revolt, and Geoffrey Cobbe and John Hanchach, members of the local gentry. The University of Cambridge, staffed by priests and enjoying special royal privileges, was widely hated by the other inhabitants of the town. A revolt backed by the Mayor of Cambridge broke out with the university as its main target. The rebels ransacked Corpus Christi College, which had connections to John of Gaunt, and the University's church, and attempted to execute the university bedel, who escaped. The university's library and archives were burnt in the centre of the town, with one Margery Starre leading the mob in a dance to the rallying cry "Away with the learning of clerks, away with it!" while the documents burned. The next day, the university was forced to negotiate a new charter, giving up its royal privileges. Unrest then spread north from Cambridge toward Ely, where the prison was opened and the local Justice of the Peace executed.

In Norfolk, the revolt was led by Geoffrey Litster, a weaver, and Sir Roger Bacon, a local lord with ties to the Suffolk rebels. Litster began sending out messengers across the county in a call to arms on 14 June, and isolated outbreaks of violence occurred. The rebels assembled on 17 June outside Norwich and killed Sir Robert Salle, who was in charge of the city defences and had attempted to negotiate a settlement. The people of the town then opened the gates to let the rebels in. They began looting buildings and killed Reginald Eccles, a local official. William de Ufford, the Earl of Suffolk fled his estates and travelled in disguise to London. The other leading members of the local gentry were captured and forced to play out the roles of a royal household, working for Litster. Violence spread out across the county, as prisons were opened, Flemish immigrants killed, court records burned, and property looted and destroyed.

==== Northern and western England ====
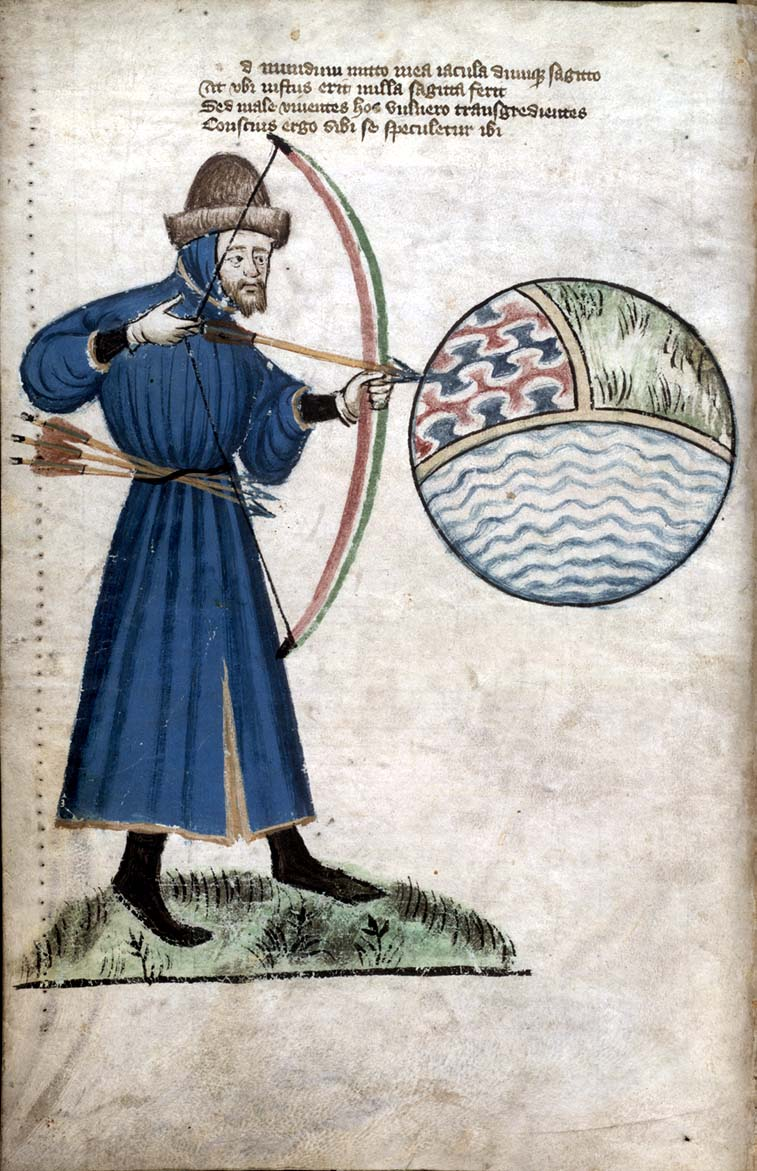
An illustration from Vox Clamantis by John Gower, a poem which described and condemned the Revolt, in Glasgow University Library

Revolts also occurred across the rest of England, particularly in the cities of the north, traditionally centres of political unrest. In the town of Beverley, violence broke out between the richer mercantile elite and the poorer townspeople during May. By the end of the month the rebels had taken power and replaced the former town administration with their own. The rebels attempted to enlist the support of Alexander Neville, the Archbishop of York, and in June forced the former town government to agree to arbitration through Neville. Peace was restored in June 1382 but tensions continued to simmer for many years.

Word of the troubles in the south-east spread north, slowed by the poor communication links of medieval England. In Leicester, where John of Gaunt had a substantial castle, warnings arrived of a force of rebels advancing on the city from Lincolnshire, who were intent on destroying the castle and its contents. The mayor and the town mobilised their defences, including a local militia, but the rebels never arrived. John of Gaunt was in Berwick when word reached him on 17 June of the revolt. Not knowing that Wat Tyler had by now been killed, John of Gaunt placed his castles in Yorkshire and Wales on alert. Fresh rumours, many of them incorrect, continued to arrive in Berwick, suggesting widespread rebellions across the west and east of England and the looting of the ducal household in Leicester; rebel units were even said to be hunting for the Duke himself. Gaunt began to march to Bamburgh Castle, but then changed course and diverted north into Scotland, only returning south once the fighting was over.

News of the initial events in London also reached York around 17 June, and attacks at once broke out on the properties of the Dominican friars, the Franciscan friaries and other religious institutions. Violence continued over the coming weeks, and on 1 July a group of armed men, under the command of John de Gisbourne, forced their way into the city and attempted to seize control. The mayor, Simon de Quixlay, gradually began to reclaim authority, but order was not properly restored until 1382. The news of the southern revolt reached Scarborough where riots broke out against the ruling elite on 23 June, with the rebels dressed in white hoods with a red tail at the back. Members of the local government were deposed from office, and one tax collector was nearly lynched. By 1382 the elite had re-established power.

In the Somerset town of Bridgwater, revolt broke out on 19 June, led by Thomas Ingleby and Adam Brugge. The crowds attacked the local Augustine house and forced their master to give up his local privileges and pay a ransom. The rebels then turned on the properties of John Sydenham, a local merchant and official, looting his manor and burning paperwork, before executing Walter Baron, a local man. The Ilchester prison was stormed, and one unpopular prisoner executed.

=== Suppression ===
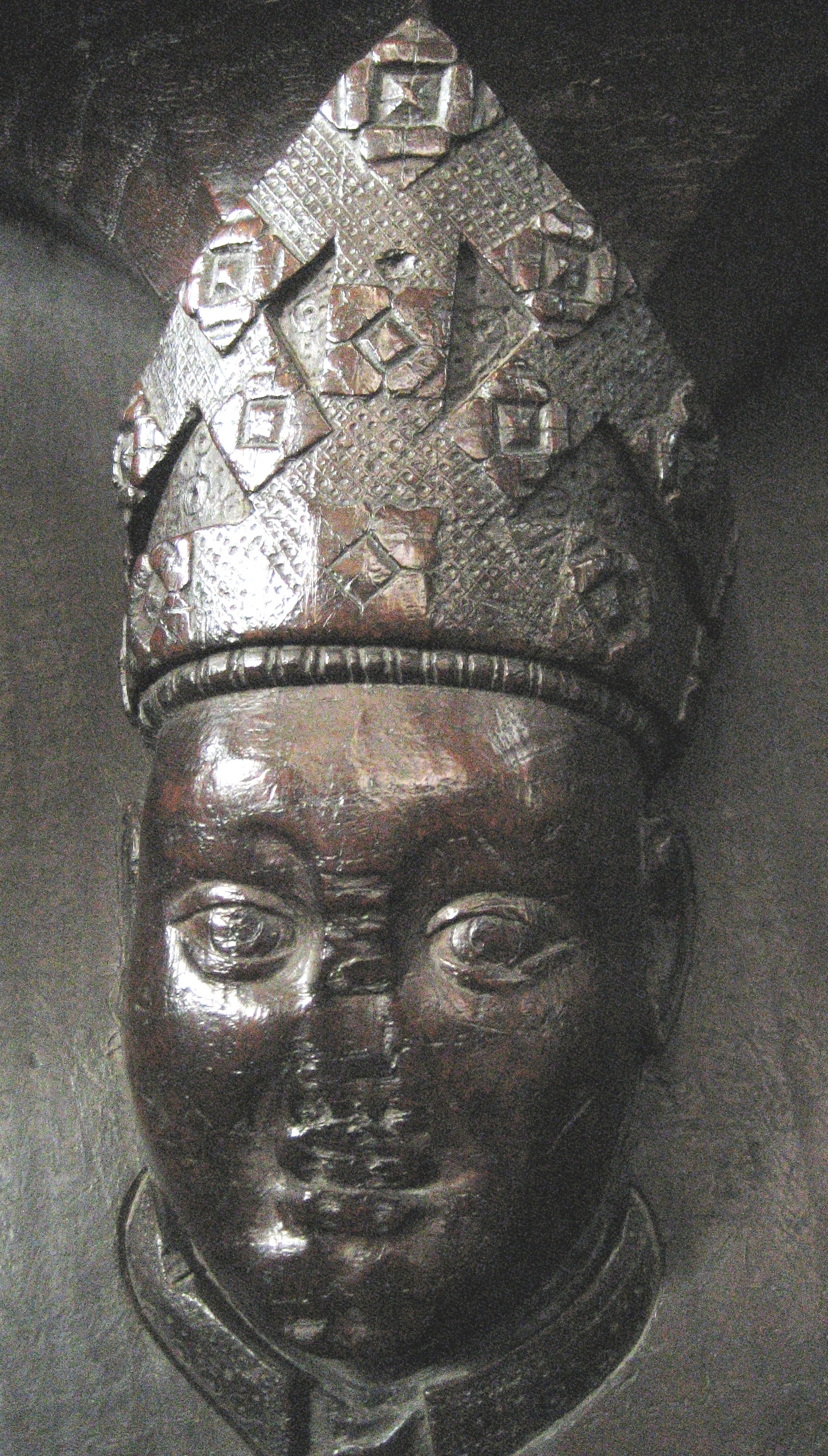
A 14th-century carving of Henry Despenser, the victor of the Battle of North Walsham in Norfolk

The royal suppression of the revolt began shortly after the death of Wat Tyler on 15 June. Sir Robert Knolles, Sir Nicholas Brembre and Sir Robert Launde were appointed to restore control in the capital. A summons was put out for soldiers, probably around 4,000 men were mustered in London, and expeditions to the other troubled parts of the country soon followed.

The revolt in East Anglia was independently suppressed by Henry Despenser, the Bishop of Norwich. Henry was in Stamford in Lincolnshire when the revolt broke out, and when he found out about it he marched south with eight men-at-arms and a small force of archers, gathering more forces as he went. He marched first to Peterborough, where he routed the local rebels and executed any he could capture, including some who had taken shelter in the local abbey. He then headed south-east via Huntingdon and Ely, reached Cambridge on 19 June, and then headed further into the rebel-controlled areas of Norfolk. Henry reclaimed Norwich on 24 June, before heading out with a company of men to track down the rebel leader, Geoffrey Litster. The two forces met at the Battle of North Walsham on 25 or 26 June; the Bishop's forces triumphed and Litster was captured and executed. Henry's quick action was essential to the suppression of the revolt in East Anglia, but he was very unusual in taking matters into his own hands in this way, and his execution of the rebels without royal sanction was illegal.

On 17 June, the King dispatched his half-brother Thomas Holland and Sir Thomas Trivet to Kent with a small force to restore order. They held courts at Maidstone and Rochester. William de Ufford, the Earl of Suffolk, returned to his county on 23 June, accompanied by a force of 500 men. He quickly subdued the area and was soon holding court in Mildenhall, where many of the accused were sentenced to death. He moved on into Norfolk on 6 July, holding court in Norwich, Great Yarmouth and Hacking. Hugh, Lord la Zouche, led the legal proceedings against the rebels in Cambridgeshire. In St Albans, the Abbot arrested William Grindecobbe and his main supporters.

On 20 June, the King's uncle, Thomas of Woodstock, and Robert Tresilian, the replacement Chief Justice, were given special commissions across the whole of England. Thomas oversaw court cases in Essex, backed up by a substantial military force as resistance was continuing and the county was still in a state of unrest. Richard himself visited Essex, where he met with a rebel delegation seeking confirmation of the grants the King had given at Mile End. Richard rejected them, allegedly telling them that "rustics you were and rustics you are still. You will remain in bondage, not as before, but incomparably harsher." (Note: The "rustics" quotation from Richard II is from the chronicler Thomas Walsingham, and should be treated with caution. Historian Dan Jones suspects that although Richard no doubt despised the rebels, the language itself may have been largely invented by Walsingham.) Tresilian soon joined Thomas, and carried out 31 executions in Chelmsford, then travelled to St Albans in July for further court trials, which appear to have utilised dubious techniques to ensure convictions. Thomas went on to Gloucester with 200 soldiers to suppress the unrest there. Henry Percy, the Earl of Northumberland, was tasked to restore order to Yorkshire.

A wide range of laws were invoked in the process of the suppression, from general treason to charges of book burning or demolishing houses, a process complicated by the relatively narrow definition of treason at the time. The use of informants and denunciations became common, causing fear to spread across the country; by November at least 1,500 people had been executed or killed in battle. Many of those who had lost property in the revolt attempted to seek legal compensation, and John of Gaunt made particular efforts to track down those responsible for destroying his Savoy Palace. Most had only limited success, as the defendants were rarely willing to attend court. The last of these cases was resolved in 1387.

The rebel leaders were quickly rounded up. A rebel leader by the name of Jack Straw was captured in London and executed. (Note: As noted above, questions exist over Jack Straw's identity. The chronicler Thomas Walsingham attributes a long confession to the Jack Straw executed in London, but the reliability of this is questioned by historians: Rodney Hilton refers to it as "somewhat dubious", while Alastair Dunn considers it to be essentially a fabrication. There are no reliable details of the trial or execution.) John Ball was caught in Coventry, tried in St Albans, and executed on 15 July. Grindecobbe was also tried and executed in St Albans. John Wrawe was tried in London; he probably gave evidence against 24 of his colleagues in the hope of a pardon, but was sentenced to be executed by being hanged, drawn and quartered on 6 May 1382. Sir Roger Bacon was probably arrested before the final battle in Norfolk, and was tried and imprisoned in the Tower of London before finally being pardoned by the Crown. As of September 1381, Thomas Ingleby of Bridgwater had successfully evaded the authorities.

Although women such as Johanna Ferrour played a prominent role in the revolt, no evidence has been found of women being executed or punished as harshly as their male counterparts.

=== Aftermath ===
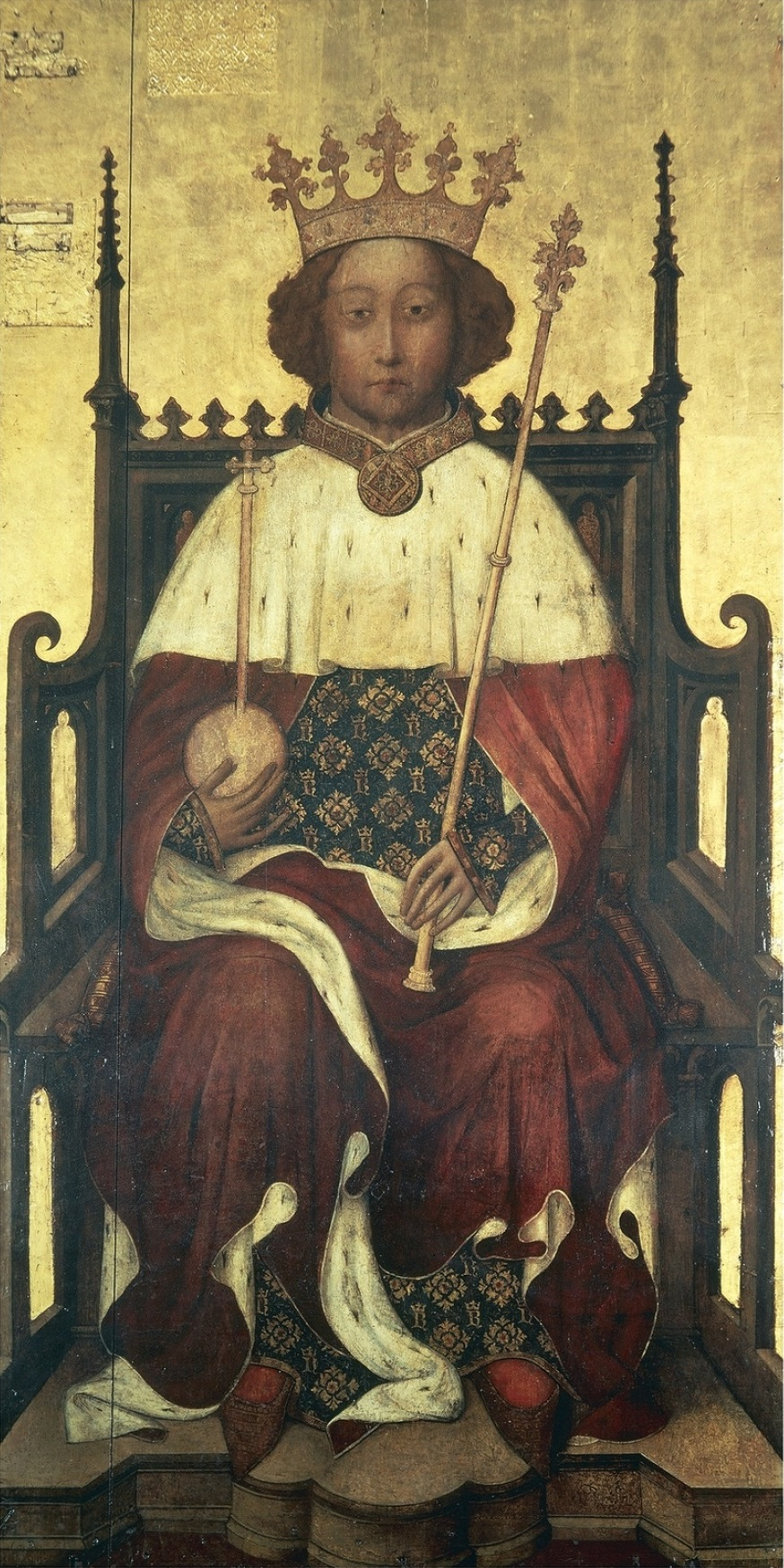
Coronation portrait of Richard II, now in Westminster Abbey

The royal government and Parliament began to re-establish the normal processes of government after the revolt; as the historian Michael Postan describes, the uprising was in many ways a "passing episode". On 30 June, the King ordered England's serfs to return to their previous conditions of service, and on 2 July the royal charters signed under duress during the rising were formally revoked. Parliament met in November to discuss the events of the year and how best to respond to their challenges. The revolt was blamed on the misconduct of royal officials, who, it was argued, had been excessively greedy and overbearing. The Commons stood behind the existing labour laws, but requested changes in the royal council, which Richard granted. Richard also granted general pardons to those who had executed rebels without due process, to all men who had remained loyal, and to all those who had rebelled – with the exception of the men of Bury St Edmunds, any men who had been involved in the killing of the King's advisers, and those who were still on the run from prison.

Despite the violence of the suppression, the government and local lords were relatively circumspect in restoring order after the revolt, and continued to be worried about fresh revolts for several decades. Few lords took revenge on their peasants except through the legal processes of the courts. Low-level unrest continued for several more years. In September 1382 there was trouble in Norfolk, involving an apparent plot against the Bishop of Norwich, and in March the following year there was an investigation into a plot to kill the sheriff of Devon. When negotiating rents with their landlords, peasants alluded to the memory of the revolt and the threat of violence.

There were no further attempts by Parliament to impose a poll tax or to reform England's fiscal system. The Commons instead concluded at the end of 1381 that the military effort on the Continent should be "carefully but substantially reduced". Unable to raise fresh taxes, the government had to curtail its foreign policy and military expeditions and began to examine the options for peace. The institution of serfdom declined after 1381, but primarily for economic rather than political reasons. Rural wages continued to increase, and lords increasingly sold their serfs' freedom in exchange for cash, or converted traditional forms of tenure to new leasehold arrangements. During the 15th century serfdom vanished in England.

== Rebels ==
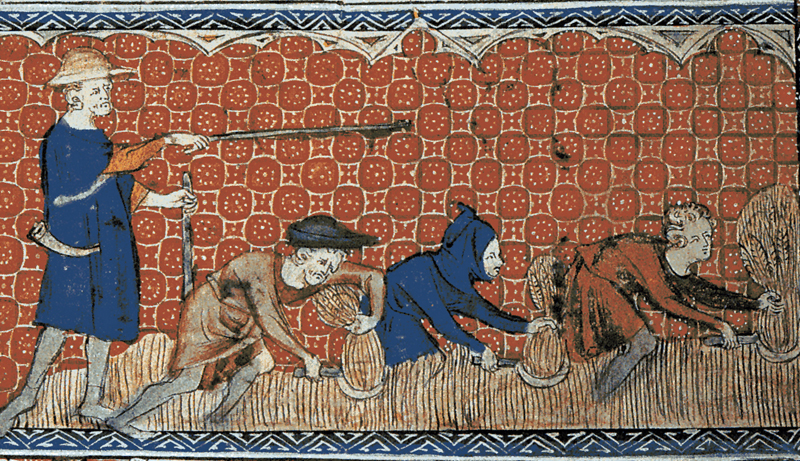
14th-century rural scene of a reeve directing serfs, from the Queen Mary Psalter. British Library, London

Chroniclers primarily described the rebels as rural serfs, using broad, derogatory Latin terms such as serviles rustici, servile genus and rusticitas. Some chroniclers, including Knighton, also noted the presence of runaway apprentices, artisans and others, sometimes terming them the "lesser commons." The evidence from the court records following the revolt, albeit biased in various ways, similarly shows the involvement of a much broader community, and the earlier perception that the rebels were only constituted of unfree serfs is now rejected. (Note: Historian Sylvia Federico notes the dangers in treating the pardons lists simplistically, given the tendency for some innocent individuals to acquire pardons for additional security, and the tendency for cases to be brought against individuals for local, non-political reasons.)

The rural rebels came from a wide range of backgrounds, but typically they were, as the historian Christopher Dyer describes, "people well below the ranks of the gentry, but who mainly held some land and goods", and not the very poorest in society, who formed a minority of the rebel movement. Many had held positions of authority in local village governance, and these seem to have provided leadership to the revolt. Some were artisans, including, as the historian Rodney Hilton lists, "carpenters, sawyers, masons, cobblers, tailors, weavers, fullers, glovers, hosiers, skinners, bakers, butchers, innkeepers, cooks and a lime-burner". They were predominantly male, but with some women in their ranks. The rebels were typically illiterate; only between 5 and 15 per cent of England could read during this period. They also came from a broad range of local communities, including at least 330 south-eastern villages.

Many of the rebels had urban backgrounds, and the majority of those involved in the events of London were probably local townsfolk rather than peasants. In some cases, the townsfolk who joined the revolt were the urban poor, attempting to gain at the expense of the local elites. In London, for example, the urban rebels appear to have largely been the poor and unskilled. Other urban rebels were part of the elite, such as at York where the protesters were typically prosperous members of the local community, while in some instances, townsfolk allied themselves with the rural population, as at Bury St Edmunds. In other cases, such as Canterbury, the influx of population from the villages following the Black Death made any distinction between urban and rural less meaningful. With the Peasants' Revolt marking the revolution of the freedom fight, labour had become so expensive that the feudal system was ultimately coming to an end.

The rebels of the Peasants' Revolt were represented by various writers since they did not represent themselves in historical records. The distortion of written records implied that these rebels were illiterate, or otherwise incoherent. Some of these distortions made by countless authors were also interpretative and favored their own positions, making the job of historians more difficult as they try to uncover a more truthful representation of the rebels. Author and medievalist Steven Justice exemplifies that the rebels were, in fact, capable of speech and language at its most developed. Examples of this included cultural forms of expression such as rituals, performances, and literary texts.

The vast majority of those involved in the revolt of 1381 were not represented in Parliament and were excluded from its decision-making. In a few cases the rebels were led or joined by relatively prosperous members of the gentry, such as Sir Roger Bacon in Norfolk. Some of them later claimed to have been forced to join the revolt by the rebels. Clergy also formed part of the revolt; as well as the more prominent leaders, such as John Ball or John Wrawe, nearly 20 are mentioned in the records of the revolt in the south-east. Some were pursuing local grievances, some were disadvantaged and suffering relative poverty, and others appear to have been motivated by strong radical beliefs.

Many of those involved in the revolt used pseudonyms, particularly in the letters sent around the country to encourage support and fresh uprisings. They were used both to avoid incriminating particular individuals and to allude to popular values and stories. One popular assumed name was Piers Plowman, taken from the main character in William Langland's poem. Jack was also a widely used rebel pseudonym, and historians Steven Justice and Carter Revard suggest that this may have been because it resonated with the Jacques of the French Jacquerie revolt several decades earlier.

== Legacy ==
=== Historiography ===
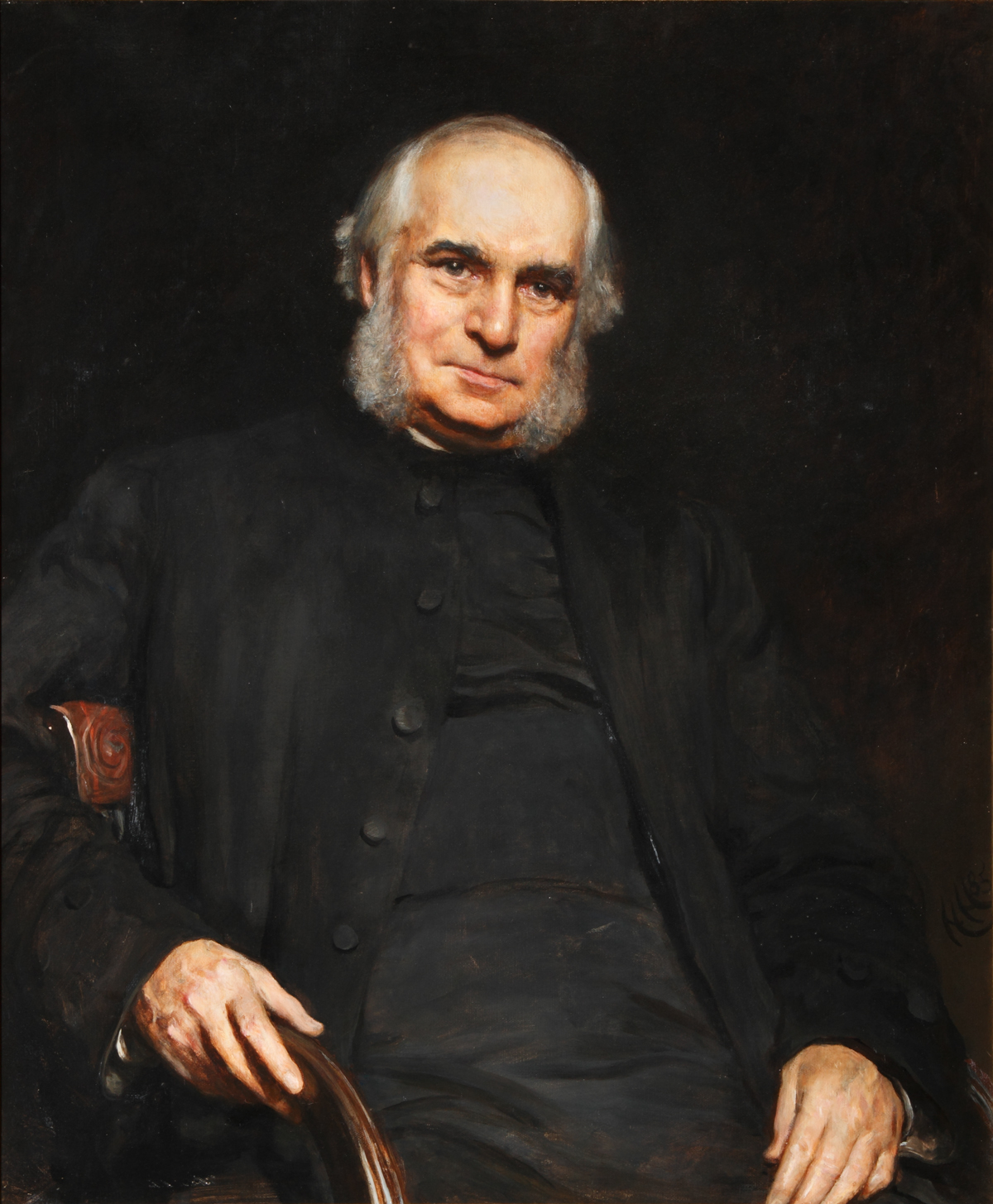
Historian William Stubbs, who considered the revolt "one of the most portentous events in the whole of our history", painted by Hubert von Herkomer

Contemporary chroniclers of the events in the revolt have formed an important source for historians. The chroniclers were biased against the rebel cause and typically portrayed the rebels, in the words of the historian Susan Crane, as "beasts, monstrosities or misguided fools". London chroniclers were also unwilling to admit the role of ordinary Londoners in the revolt, preferring to place the blame entirely on rural peasants from the south-east. Among the key accounts was the anonymous Anonimalle Chronicle, whose author appears to have been part of the royal court and an eye-witness to many of the events in London. The chronicler Thomas Walsingham was present for much of the revolt, but focused his account on the terror of the social unrest and was extremely biased against the rebels. The events were recorded in France by Jean Froissart, the author of the Chronicles. He had well-placed sources close to the revolt, but was inclined to elaborate the known facts with colourful stories. No sympathetic accounts of the rebels survive.

For four centuries, chroniclers and historians of the revolt were overwhelmingly negative, but attitudes started to change in the 18th century as serfdom was long rejected and in the aftermath of the radicalism associated with the French Revolution. At the end of the 19th century, there was a surge in historical interest in the Peasants' Revolt, spurred by the contemporary growth of the labour and socialist movements. Work by Charles Oman, Edgar Powell, André Réville and G. M. Trevelyan established the course of the revolt. By 1907, the accounts of the chroniclers were all widely available in print and the main public records concerning the events had been identified. Réville began to use the legal indictments that had been used against suspected rebels after the revolt as a fresh source of historical information, and over the next century extensive research was carried out into the local economic and social history of the revolt, using scattered local sources across south-east England.

Interpretations of the revolt have changed over the years. Historians of the 17th century, such as John Smyth, established the idea that the revolt had marked the end of unfree labour and serfdom in England. Historians of the 19th century, such as William Stubbs and Thorold Rogers, reinforced this conclusion, Stubbs describing it as "one of the most portentous events in the whole of our history". In the 20th century, this interpretation was increasingly challenged by historians such as May McKisack, Michael Postan and Richard Dobson, who revised the impact of the revolt on further political and economic events in England. Mid-20th century Marxist historians were both interested in, and generally sympathetic to, the rebel cause, a trend culminating in Hilton's 1973 account of the uprising, set against the wider context of peasant revolts across Europe during the period. The Peasants' Revolt has received more academic attention than any other medieval revolt, and this research has been interdisciplinary, involving historians, literary scholars and international collaboration.

A large slate memorial to "The Great Rising" was commissioned by Matthew Bell and carved by Emily Hoffnung. It was unveiled by the film director Ken Loach in Smithfield on 15 July 2015.

=== In popular culture ===
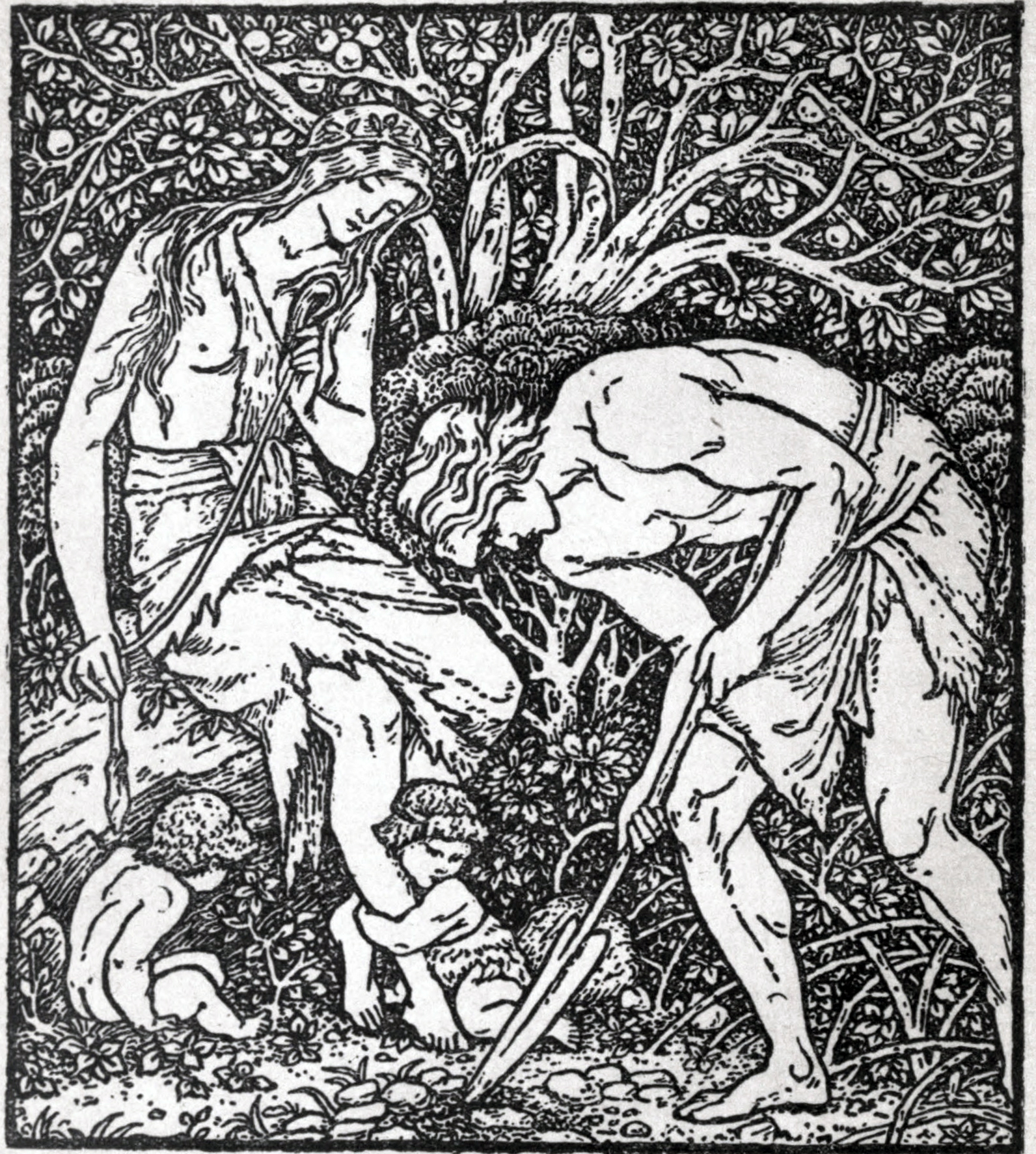
Illustration from title page to William Morris's A Dream of John Ball (1888), by Edward Burne-Jones

The Peasants' Revolt became a popular literary subject. The poet John Gower, who had close ties to officials involved in the suppression of the revolt, amended his famous poem Vox Clamantis after the revolt, inserting a section condemning the rebels and likening them to wild animals. Geoffrey Chaucer, who lived in Aldgate and may have been in London during the revolt, used the rebel killing of Flemings as a metaphor for wider disorder in The Nun's Priest's Tale part of The Canterbury Tales, parodying Gower's poem. Although the Peasants' Revolt was only ever mentioned sparingly in Geoffrey Chaucer's The Canterbury Tales, the Peasants' Revolt was one of the many historical incidents that occurred in Chaucer's life prior to his popular works. With other events such as the Black Death, the devastation that followed after the plague incited the peasants that survived to seek a better quality of life. Evidence of the impression that the revolt made on Chaucer can be seen in the Miller's Prologue of The Canterbury Tales. Chaucer portrays the Miller as someone who is not entirely satisfied with the typical idea of what a peasant is and how they should live, and he uses metaphors in order to make this implication in the Miller's Prologue. The notion that the Miller is able to tell a tale that can match, or is even better than one of the highest-ranking Knights in the pilgrimage shows the rebellion and persistence in bettering one's status, which is similar to what was seen in the attitudes of the peasants in their revolt. Chaucer otherwise made no reference to the revolt in his work, possibly because as he was a client of the King it would have been politically unwise to discuss it. William Langland, the author of the poem Piers Plowman, which had been widely used by the rebels, made various changes to its text after the revolt in order to distance himself from their cause.

The revolt formed the basis for the late 16th-century play, The Life and Death of Jack Straw, possibly written by George Peele and probably originally designed for production in the city's guild pageants. It portrays Jack Straw as a tragic figure, being led into wrongful rebellion by John Ball, making clear political links between the instability of late-Elizabethan England and the 14th century. The story of the revolt was used in pamphlets during the English Civil War of the 17th century, and formed part of John Cleveland's early history of the war. It was deployed as a cautionary account in political speeches during the 18th century, and a chapbook entitled The History of Wat Tyler and Jack Strawe proved popular during the Jacobite risings and American War of Independence. The historian James Crossley argues that after the French Revolution, the Peasants' Revolt was seen more positively, especially among radicals and revolutionaries. Thomas Paine and Edmund Burke argued over the lessons to be drawn from the revolt, Paine expressing sympathy for the rebels and Burke condemning the violence. The Romantic poet Robert Southey based his 1794 play Wat Tyler on the events, taking a radical and pro-rebel perspective.

As the historian Michael Postan describes, the revolt became famous "as a landmark in social development and [as] a typical instance of working-class revolt against oppression", and was widely used in 19th and 20th century socialist literature. William Morris built on Chaucer in his novel A Dream of John Ball, published in 1888, creating a narrator who was openly sympathetic to the peasant cause, albeit a 19th-century persona taken back to the 14th century by a dream. The story ends with a prophecy that socialist ideals will one day be successful. In turn, this representation of the revolt influenced Morris's utopian socialist News from Nowhere. Florence Converse used the revolt in her novel Long Will in 1903. Later 20th century socialists continued to draw parallels between the revolt and contemporary political struggles, including during the arguments over the introduction of the Community Charge in the United Kingdom during the 1980s.

Conspiracy theorists, including writer John Robinson, have attempted to explain alleged flaws in mainstream historical accounts of the events of 1381, such as the speed with which the rebellion was coordinated. Theories include that the revolt was led by a secret, occult organisation called "the Great Society", said to be an offshoot of the order of the Knights Templar destroyed in 1312, or that the fraternity of the Freemasons was covertly involved in organising the revolt. (Note: The term "the Great Society" emerges from indictments against the rebels, in which references were made the magne societatis. This probably meant "large company" or "great band" of rebels, but was mistranslated in the late 19th century to refer to the "Great Society".)

A film dramatizing the revolt, The Uprising, was released in 2026, with actors Jamie Bell and Cosmo Jarvis portraying Ball and Tyler.

== See also ==
- Jack Cade
- Kett's Rebellion
- Levellers
- John Preston (rebel)
- Popular revolt in late-medieval Europe
- Statute of Cambridge 1388

== Bibliography ==
- Arner, Lynn (2013). Chaucer, Gower, and the Vernacular Rising: Poetry and the Problem of the Populace After 1381. University Park: Penn State University Press. ISBN 978-0-271-05894-8.
- Barker, J. (2014). 1381: The Year of the Peasants' Revolt. New Haven: Harvard University Press. ISBN 978-0-67436-814-9.
- Barron, Caroline M. (1981). Revolt in London: 11 to 15 June 1381. London: Museum of London. ISBN 978-0-904818-05-5.
- Brie, Friedrich (1906). "Wat Tyler and Jack Straw". English Historical Review. 21: 106–111.
- Butcher, A. F. (1987). "English Urban Society and the Revolt of 1381". In Hilton, Rodney; Alton, T. H. (eds.). The English Rising of 1381. Cambridge: Cambridge University Press. pp. 84–111. ISBN 978-1-84383-738-1.
- Cohn, Samuel K. (2013). Popular Protest in Late Medieval English Towns. Cambridge: Cambridge University Press. ISBN 978-1-107-02780-0.
- Crane, Susan (1992). "The Writing Lesson of 1381". In Hanawalt, Barbara A. (ed.). Chaucer's England: Literature in Historical Context. Minneapolis: University of Minnesota Press. pp. 201–222. ISBN 978-0-8166-2019-7.
- Crossley, James. 2021 "John Ball and the 'Peasants' Revolt'", in James Crossley and Alastair Lockhart (eds.), Critical Dictionary of Apocalyptic and Millenarian Movements.
- Crossley, James (2022). Spectres of John Ball: The Peasants' Revolt in English Political History, 1381–2020. London: Equinox. ISBN 978-1800501362.
- Crow, Martin M.; Leland, Virginia E. (2008). "Chaucer's Life". In Cannon, Christopher (ed.). The Riverside Chaucer (3rd ed.). Oxford: Oxford University Press. pp. xi–xxi. ISBN 978-0-19-955209-2.
- Dilks, T. Bruce (1927). "Bridgwater and the Insurrection of 1381". Journal of the Somerset Archaeological and Natural History Society. 73: 57–67.
- Dobson, R. B. (1983). The Peasants' Revolt of 1381 (2nd ed.). London: Macmillan. ISBN 0-333-25505-4.
- Dobson, R. B. (1987). "The Risings in York, Beverley and Scarborough". In Hilton, Rodney; Alton, T. H. (eds.). The English Rising of 1381. Cambridge: Cambridge University Press. pp. 112–142. ISBN 978-1-84383-738-1.
- Dunn, Alastair (2002). The Great Rising of 1381: the Peasants' Revolt and England's Failed Revolution. Stroud, UK: Tempus. ISBN 978-0-7524-2323-4.
- Dyer, Christopher (2000). Everyday Life in Medieval England. London and New York: Hambledon and London. ISBN 978-1-85285-201-6.
- Dyer, Christopher (2003). "Introduction". In Hilton, Rodney (ed.). Bondmen Made Free: Medieval Peasant Movements and the English Rising of 1381 (New ed.). Abingdon, UK: Routledge. pp. ix–xv. ISBN 978-0-415-31614-9.
- Dyer, Christopher (2009). Making a Living in the Middle Ages: the People of Britain 850–1520. New Haven and London: Yale University Press. ISBN 978-0-300-10191-1.
- Eiden, Herbert (1999). "Norfolk, 1382: a Sequel to the Peasants' Revolt". The English Historical Review. 114 (456): 370–377. doi:10.1093/ehr/114.456.370.
- Ellis, Steve (2000). Chaucer at Large: the Poet in the Modern Imagination. Minneapolis: University of Minnesota Press. ISBN 978-0-8166-3376-0.
- Faith, Rosamond (1987). "The 'Great Rumour' of 1377 and Peasant Ideology". In Hilton, Rodney; Alton, T. H. (eds.). The English Rising of 1381. Cambridge: Cambridge University Press. pp. 43–73. ISBN 978-1-84383-738-1.
- Federico, Silvia (2001). "The Imaginary Society: Women in 1381". Journal of British Studies. 40 (2): 159–183. doi:10.1086/386239.
- Fisher, John H. (1964). John Gower, Moral Philosopher and Friend of Chaucer. New York: New York University Press. ISBN 978-0-8147-0149-2.
- Galloway, Andrew (2010). "Reassessing Gower's Dream Visions". In Dutton, Elizabeth; Hines, John; Yeager, R. F. (eds.). John Gower, Trilingual Poet: Language, Translation, and Tradition. Woodbridge, UK: Boydell Press. pp. 288–303. ISBN 978-1-84384-250-7.
- Given-Wilson, Chris (1996). The English Nobility in the Late Middle Ages. London: Routledge. ISBN 978-0-203-44126-8.
- Harding, Alan (1987). "The Revolt Against the Justices". In Hilton, Rodney; Alton, T. H. (eds.). The English Rising of 1381. Cambridge: Cambridge University Press. pp. 165–193. ISBN 978-1-84383-738-1.
- Hilton, Rodney (1987). "Introduction". In Hilton, Rodney; Alton, T. H. (eds.). The English Rising of 1381. Cambridge: Cambridge University Press. pp. 1–8. ISBN 978-1-84383-738-1.
- Hilton, Rodney (1995). Bondmen Made Free: Medieval Peasant Movements and the English Rising of 1381. London: Routledge. ISBN 978-0-415-01880-7.
- Hussey, Stanley Stewart (1971). Chaucer: an Introduction. London: Methuen. ISBN 978-0-416-29920-5.
- Israel, Charles E. (1963). Who was then the gentleman? A novel. New York: Simon and Schuster.
- Jones, Dan (2010). Summer of Blood: the Peasants' Revolt of 1381. London: Harper Press. ISBN 978-0-00-721393-1.
- Justice, Steven (1994). Writing and Rebellion: England in 1381. Berkeley and Los Angeles: University of California Press. ISBN 0-520-20697-5.
- Lyle, Marjorie (2002). Canterbury: 2000 Years of History (Revised ed.). Stroud, UK: Tempus. ISBN 978-0-7524-1948-0.
- Matheson, Lister M. (1998). "The Peasants' Revolt through Five Centuries of Rumor and Reporting: Richard Fox, John Stow, and Their Successors". Studies in Philology. 95 (2): 121–151.
- Mortimer, Ian (1981). The Fears of Henry IV: the Life of England's Self-Made King. London: Vintage. ISBN 978-1-84413-529-5.
- Oman, Charles (1906). The Great Revolt of 1381. Oxford: Clarendon Press. OCLC 752927432.
- Ortenberg, Veronica (1981). In Search of the Holy Grail: the Quest for the Middle Ages. London: Hambledon Continuum. ISBN 978-1-85285-383-9.
- Ousby, Ian (1996). The Cambridge Paperback Guide to Literature in English. Cambridge: Cambridge University Press. ISBN 978-0-521-43627-4.
- Picknett, Lynn; Prince, Clive (2007). The Templar Revelation: Secret Guardians of the True Identity of Christ (10th anniversary ed.). London: Random House. ISBN 978-0-552-15540-3.
- Postan, Michael (1975). The Medieval Economy and Society. Harmondsworth, UK: Penguin Books. ISBN 0-14-020896-8.
- Powell, Edgar (1896). The Rising of 1381 in East Anglia. Cambridge: Cambridge University Press. OCLC 1404665.
- Prescott, Andrew (2004). "'The Hand of God': the Suppression of the Peasants' Revolt in 1381". In Morgan, Nigel (ed.). Prophecy, Apocalypse and the Day of Doom. Donington, UK: Shaun Tyas. pp. 317–341. ISBN 978-1-900289-68-9.
- Prescott, Andrew (2017). "'Great and Horrible Rumour': Shaping the English Revolt of 1381". In Firnhaber-Baker, Justine; Schoenaers, Dirk (eds.). The Routledge History Handbook of Medieval Revolt. London: Routledge. pp. 76–103. ISBN 9781315542423.
- Réville, André (1898). Étude sur le Soulèvement de 1381 dans les Comtés de Hertford, de Suffolk et de Norfolk (in French). Paris: A. Picard and sons. OCLC 162490454.
- Reynaud, Gaston (1897). Chroniques de Jean Froissart (in French). Vol. 10. Paris: Société de l'histoire de France.
- Ribner, Irving (2005). The English History Play in the Age of Shakespeare. Abingdon, UK: Routledge. ISBN 978-0-415-35314-4.
- Robinson, John J. (2009). Born in Blood: the Lost Secrets of Freemasonry. Lanham, US: Rowman and Littlefield. ISBN 978-1-59077-148-8.
- Rubin, Miri (2006). The Hollow Crown: a History of Britain in the Late Middle Ages. London: Penguin. ISBN 978-0-14-014825-1.
- Saul, Nigel (1999). Richard II. New Haven: Yale University Press. ISBN 978-0-300-07875-6.
- Saul, Nigel (2010). "John Gower: Prophet or Turncoat?". In Dutton, Elizabeth; Hines, John; Yeager, R. F. (eds.). John Gower, Trilingual Poet: Language, Translation, and Tradition. Woodbridge, UK: Boydell Press. pp. 85–97. ISBN 978-1-84384-250-7.
- Silvercloud, Terry David (2007). The Shape of God: Secrets, Tales, and Legends of the Dawn Warriors. Victoria, Canada: Trafford. ISBN 978-1-4251-0836-6.
- Spindler, Erik (2012). "Flemings in the Peasants' Revolt, 1381". In Skoda, Hannah; Lantschner, Patrick; Shaw, R. (eds.). Contact and Exchange in Later Medieval Europe: Essays in Honour of Malcolm Vale. Woodbridge, UK: The Boydell Press. pp. 59–78. ISBN 978-1-84383-738-1.
- Strohm, Paul (2008). "A 'Peasants' Revolt'?". In Harris, Stephen J.; Grigsby, Bryon Lee (eds.). Misconceptions About the Middle Ages. New York: Routledge. pp. 197–203. ISBN 978-0-415-77053-8.
- Sumption, J. (2009). Divided Houses: Hundred Years War. Vol. 3. London: Faber & Faber. ISBN 978-0-57124-012-8.
- Trevelyan, George (1899). England in the Age of Wycliffe. London: Longmans and Green. OCLC 12771030.
- Tuck, J. A. (1987). "Nobles, Commons and the Great Revolt of 1381". In Hilton, Rodney; Alton, T. H. (eds.). The English Rising of 1381. Cambridge: Cambridge University Press. pp. 192–212. ISBN 978-1-84383-738-1.
- Wickert, Maria (2016) [1953]. Studies in John Gower. Translated by Meindl, Robert J. Tempe, Arizona: Arizona Center for Medieval and Renaissance Studies. p. 18. ISBN 9780866985413.
