= Serfdom in England =

Indentured servitude in Britain

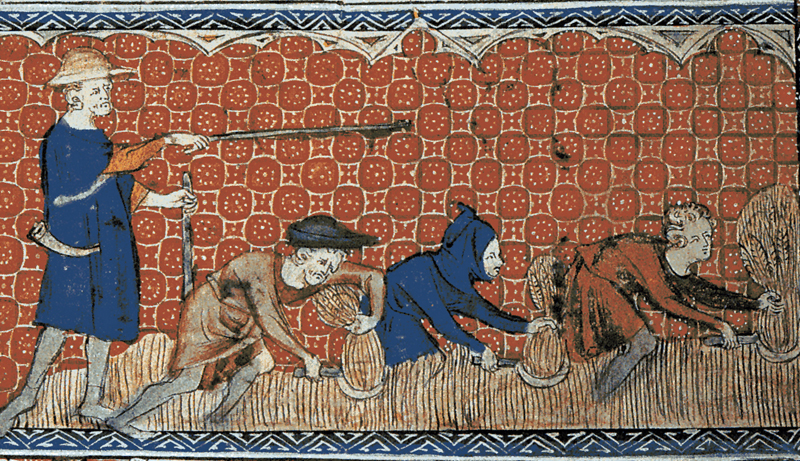
Illustration of serfs reaping wheat under the command of a lord, circa 1310.

Serfdom was present in England from its breakaway from the Roman Empire in 410AD up until its eventual decline with Peasants' Revolt in 1381, and ending fully in 1574. England depended heavily on serfdom for its agricultural working, with up to 30% of the population of England working in a fief, and 50% of the land tied up in serfdom. Peasants were often poorly taken care of by their lords, with several dying of hunger or sickness while working their land. Despite this, serfs were disallowed from "switching" fiefs; lords were often overprotective of their serfs and serfs escaping in this way to other lords were often a cause for conflict.

== Origin ==
Slavery was first brought to England with the Roman Empire, who came to Britain in 43AD. This was different from typical serfdom, as slaves were typically fully and unconditionally indebted to their owner, rather than being paid with land and protection like with serfs. The Romans exported slaves from the British Isles before their full conquest of it, but it was expanded upon with the full conquest of the isles. Serfdom was also present in the Roman Empire, however it was not nearly as widely spread as slavery. Slavery eventually morphed into serfdom across the Empire's remains as higher order governments collapsed, leading for lower class citizens to move to the countryside and enter into agreements with the landowners, resulting in serfdom.

== Height of serfdom ==
At the height of serfdom, it is estimated that 55% of all of the land in the British Isles was relegated to the serfs and their farming. England's economy depended heavily on the agricultural work done by the serfs, requiring them to often work a majority of the week in service of the lord. Fiefs were often large enough to serve from 15 to 30 peasants, along with the lord's income and the knight for defense. The serfs were also often additionally required to tend to other work for their lord, such as milking cattle or slaughtering livestock.

== Decline ==
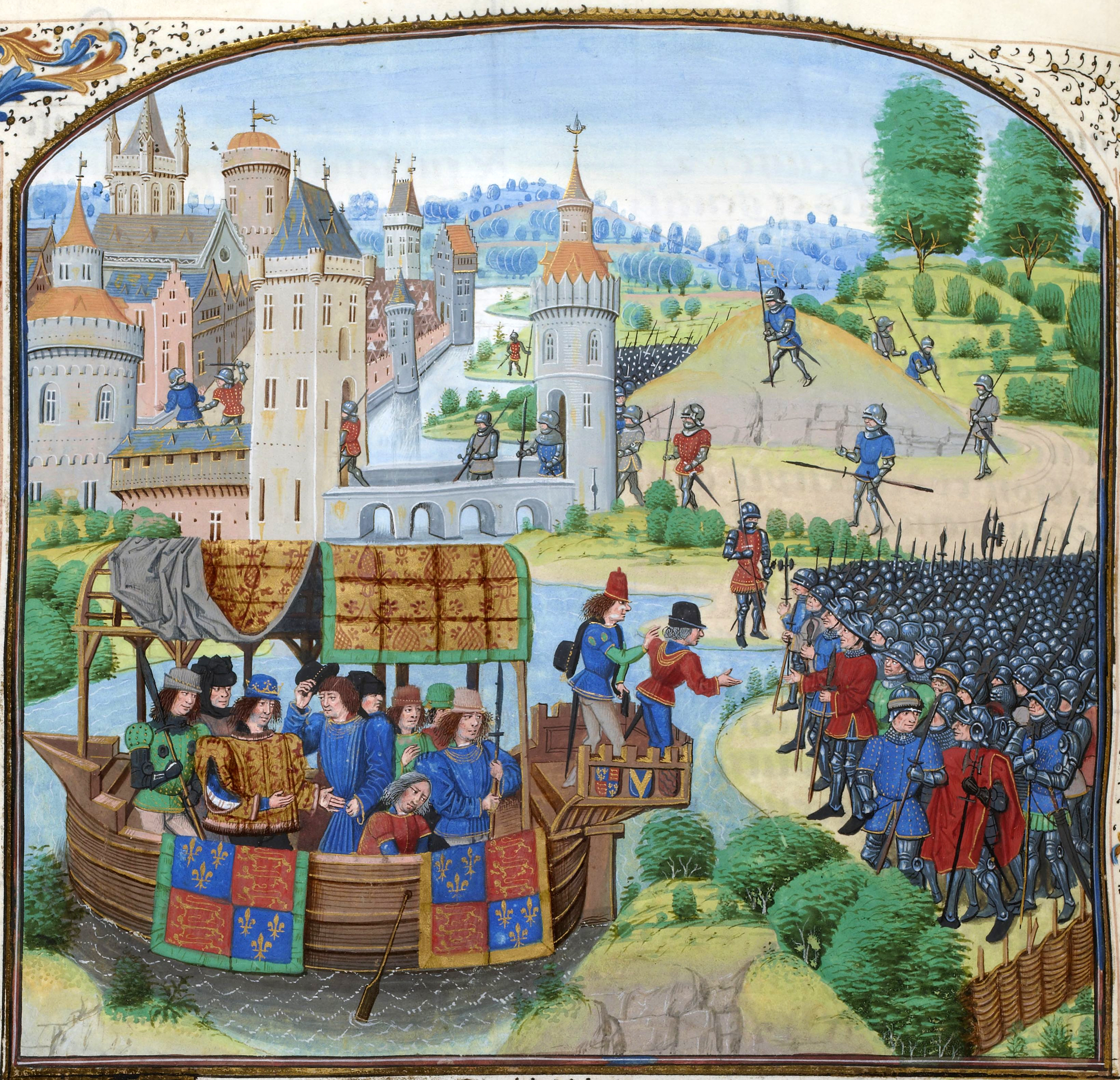
The then king of England, Richard II of England, meets with the revolting peasants

The decline of serfdom in England came with the Black Death of 1346. As peasants were often closely crammed together in their fief, resulting in the plague being easily able to kill entire populations of peasants at once. It is estimated that up to 35% of the population of England was killed by this plague, a majority of which being serfs. This led for serfs labor to be in incredibly high demand, a demand matched by the serfs demanding more pay for their labor. In addition to this, high taxes set forth by the crown as a result of the war with the French diminished an already lowering pay standard for serfs that led to the Peasant Revolt of 1381, which was unsuccessful. After this, serfs began to escape their fiefs and live in larger cities, further diminishing the amount of available labor. Serfdom in effect was ended in the 1500s when industrialization came to England; however, no official prohibition of serfdom was issued until 1574, when Queen Elizabeth I released a proclamation claiming the last remaining serfs as free.
