= Jahra Nature Reserve =

Wildlife reserve in Al Jahra, Kuwait

- An aerial view of the Al Jahra Nature Reserve
- Interactive map of Jahra Nature Reserve
- Location: Kuwait
- Nearest city: Al Jahra
- Coordinates: 29°21′45″N 47°41′37″E
- Established: 1987

Jahra Nature Reserve also known as Al-Khuwaisat Natural Reserve (Arabic: محمية الجهراء الطبيعية) is a nature reserve located in Al Jahra, Kuwait. Established in 1987, under the supervision of the Environment Public Authority, to provide a safe area for resident and migratory birds and to protect the environment and its biodiversity.
