= Kuwait Institute for Scientific Research =

Research institution in Kuwait

Government Institution overview
- Formed: 1967; 59 years ago
- Jurisdiction: Kuwait
- Headquarters: Al-Shuwaikh Educational, Kuwait City
- Government Institution executive: Dr.Faisal Salman Al-Humaidan, Director General
- Website: https://www.kisr.edu.kw/en/

The Kuwait Institute for Scientific Research (KISR) is an independent public scientific research institution based in Kuwait. Established in 1967, the institute conducts applied scientific research and provides technological and scientific consultancy to government agencies and private-sector organization's. Its research activities focus on petroleum, water resources, energy, agriculture, environmental protection, marine sciences and other areas relevant to Kuwait's economic and sustainable development.

== Research centers ==
KISR organises much of its research through specialised research centres, including:

- Petroleum Research Center
- Water Research Center
- Environment and Life Sciences Research Center
- Energy and Building Research Center

These centers undertake scientific research, applied technology development and consultancy projects in their respective fields.

== International cooperation ==
KISR maintains research partnerships and collaborations with international scientific institutions, universities and organizations. These partnerships facilitate the exchange of scientific knowledge, joint research projects and the development of technological solutions relevant to Kuwait and other countries with similar environmental and economic conditions.

The institute also contributes scientific expertise to governmental and industrial projects within Kuwait and the wider Gulf region.

== KISR Time Capsule 2061 ==
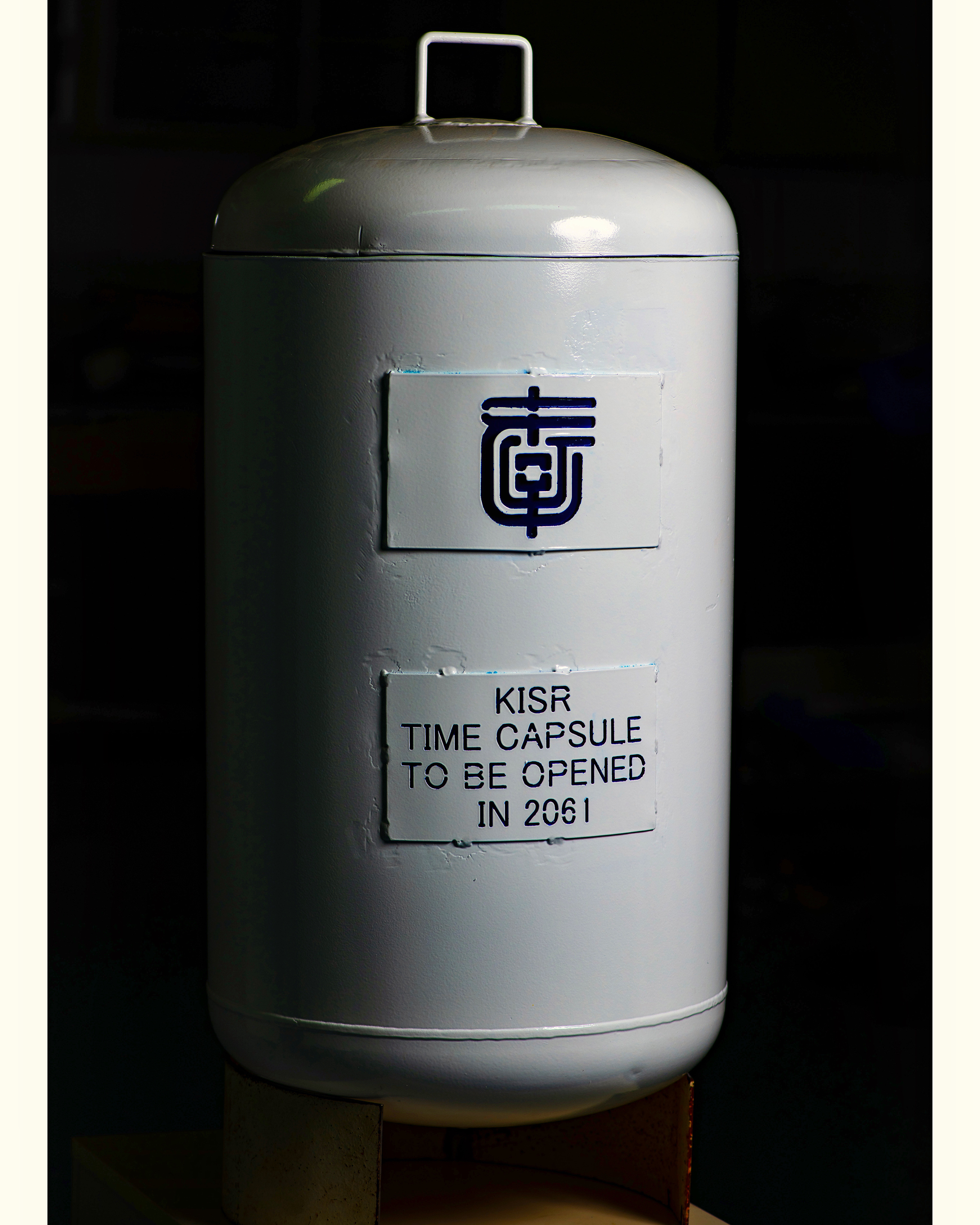
KISR Time Capsule 2061: commissioned by Kuwait Institute for Scientific Research.

In 2019, the Kuwait Institute for Scientific Research (KISR) commissioned a time capsule as part of the inauguration of the Shagaya Renewable Energy Park in western Kuwait. Named KISR Time Capsule 2061, the initiative was designed to preserve a record of contemporary Kuwaiti society, scientific achievements, technological developments and everyday life for future generations. The capsule contains a collection of historical and cultural materials, including KISR publications, local newspapers, photographs, personal letters, children's drawings, coins, a Kuwaiti flag, digital storage media and scientific memorabilia. It also includes contributions reflecting the aspirations and experiences of people from different backgrounds. The capsule was scheduled to be opened in 2061, marking the centenary of Kuwait's independence, allowing future generations to explore and understand the country's scientific, cultural and social heritage in the early twenty-first century.

== Nature Reserves Protected Under KISR ==
- Sabah Al-Ahmad Natural Reserve
- Kabd Nature Reserve (KISR Station for Research & Innovation)
- Al-Sulaibiya Protected Area
- Jal Al-Liyah
