= John Wrawe =

English rebel leader

John Wrawe (Note: Middle English pronunciation: [ˈwrau̯ə]) (d. 6 May 1382) was a rebel leader during the English Peasants' Revolt. He was executed in 1382.

== Details ==
At the start of the Peasants' Revolt in June 1381, John Wrawe, a former chaplain, marched north from Essex towards the neighbouring county of Suffolk, with the intention of raising a revolt there.

Wrawe had considerable influence over the development of the revolt across eastern England. The number of rebels in the eastern counties, then a very populous region, may have approached those in the London revolt. The authorities put up very little resistance to the revolt: the major nobles failed to organise defences, key fortifications fell easily to the rebels and the local militias were not mobilised. As in London and the south-east, this was in part due to the absence of key military leaders and the nature of English law, but any locally recruited men may also have proved unreliable in the face of a popular uprising.

On 12 June, Wrawe attacked Sir Richard Lyons' property at Overhall, advancing on to the towns of Cavendish and Bury St Edmunds in west Suffolk the next day, gathering further support as they went. John Cambridge, the prior of the wealthy Bury St Edmunds Abbey, was disliked in the town, and Wrawe allied himself with the townspeople and stormed the abbey. The prior escaped, but was found two days later and executed. A small band of rebels marched north to Thetford to extort protection money from the town, and another group tracked down Sir John Cavendish, the Chief Justice of the King's Bench and Chancellor of the University of Cambridge. Cavendish was caught in Lakenheath and executed.

On 15 June, revolt broke out in Cambridgeshire, led by elements of Wrawe's Suffolk rebellion and some local men, such as John Greyston, who had been involved in the events in London and had returned to his home county to spread the revolt, and Geoffrey Cobbe and John Hanchach, members of the local gentry. The University of Cambridge, staffed by priests and enjoying special royal privileges, was widely hated by the other inhabitants of the town. A revolt broke out in Cambridge with the university as its main target, backed up by the Mayor of Cambridge. The rebels ransacked Corpus Christi College, which had connections to John of Gaunt, and the University's church, and attempted to execute the university bedel, who escaped. The university's library and archives were burnt in the centre of the town. The next day, the university was forced to agree a new charter, giving up its royal privileges. Revolt then spread north from Cambridge toward Ely, where the gaol was opened and the local Justice of the Peace executed.

As the revolt was suppressed, John Wrawe was captured and was tried in London. He probably gave evidence against 24 of his colleagues in the hope of a pardon, but was sentenced to be executed by being hanged, drawn and quartered on 6 May 1382.

== Bibliography ==
- Dunn, Alastair (2002). The Great Rising of 1381: the Peasants' Revolt and England's Failed Revolution. Stroud, UK: Tempus. ISBN 9780752423234.
- Powell, Edgar (1896). The Rising of 1381 in East Anglia. Cambridge, UK: Cambridge University Press. OCLC 1404665.
- Tuck, J. A. (1987). "Nobles, Commons and the Great Revolt of 1381". In Hilton, Rodney; Alton, T. H. (eds.). The English Rising of 1381. Cambridge, UK: Cambridge University Press. pp. 192–212. ISBN 9781843837381.
