= Judicial officer =

Legal profession

A judicial officer is a person with the responsibilities and powers to facilitate, arbitrate, preside over, and make decisions and directions with regard to the application of the law.

Judicial officers are typically categorized as judges, magistrates, puisne judicial officers such as justices of the peace or officers of courts of limited jurisdiction; and notaries public and commissioners of oaths. The powers of judicial officers vary and are usually limited to a certain jurisdiction.

Judicial officials are also known as persons entitled to the enforcement of enforcement documents, the establishment of factual circumstances, the transfer of documents and any other functions provided for by law. In most countries, they are appointed and dismissed by the Minister of Justice. Their activities are strictly regulated by law and controlled by the state.

== Kuwait ==
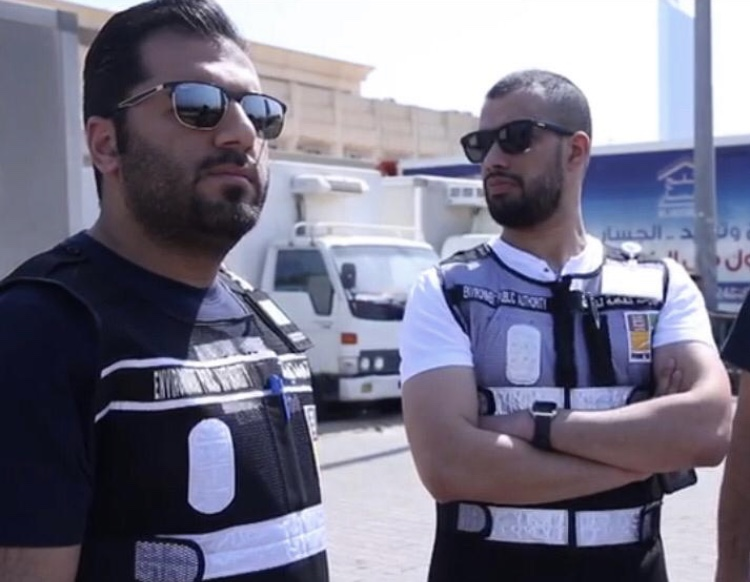
Environmental Judicial Officers at the scene of an environmental crime in Kuwait.

In Kuwait, Judicial Officers are sworn law enforcement agents with the capacity to enforce the law within their speciality, an example would be The Environment Public Authority's environmental Judicial Officers, which function, effectively, as an Environmental judicial police force that enforces the country's environmental law.

== Sri Lanka ==
In Sri Lanka, Judicial officers refer to District judges and Magistrates. They are appointed by the Judicial Service Commission.

== United States ==
In the United States a judicial officer is a political appointee to the judicial branch of the United States who is commissioned by the President of the United States. Examples include judges, magistrates, foreclosure referees and arbitrators. A complete list of judicial officers is published after every election, along with every other officer of the United States, in the United States Government Policy and Supporting Positions, or more commonly called the Plum Book.
