= Environment Public Authority =

Environment Public Authority - Kuwait
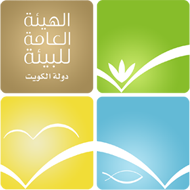
- Environment Public Authority - Kuwait

Government Institution overview
- Formed: 1995; 31 years ago
- Jurisdiction: Kuwait
- Headquarters: Industrial Shuwaikh
- Motto: تسوى نحميها It's worth protecting
- Government Institution executive: Abdullah Al-Ahmad Al-Humoud Al-Sabah, Director General
- Website: http://www.epa.org.kw

The Environment Public Authority of Kuwait is an independent governmental organization dedicated to environmental action, and domestic and international legislation and policy regarding the environment. The Environment Public Authority serves as the epicenter of governmental action regarding the preservation of the environment in Kuwait. It was founded in 1995 through law number 21.

Since its establishment, the Environment Public Authority of Kuwait has been actively participating on a local, regional, and international scale with environmental legislation. Its first and founding Director General was Dr. Muhammad Al-Saarawi. It was also formerly led by Dr. Salah Al-Mudhi, and his successor Sheikh Abdullah Al-Ahmad AlHumoud Al-Sabah is currently the serving Director General. The Environment Public Authority also enforces environmental legislation, alongside the Environmental Police of Kuwait, with penalties that vary depending on the environmental crime committed.

== Departments ==
- Information Technology
- Planning and Environmental Impact Assessment Department
- Administrative & Training Department
- International Affairs Department
- Coastal & Desertification Monitoring Department
- Analytical Laboratories Center
- Department of Engineering Affairs
- Department of Industrial Environment
- Office of Strategic Planning
- Research and Studies Office
- Conservation of Biodiversity department
- The Secretariat of Committees
- Department of Legal Affairs
- Public Affairs and Environmental Awareness Department
- Director General's Office
- Air Quality Monitoring Department
- Industrial Environment Department
- Environmental Inspection and Environmental Emergencies Department
- Aquatic Environmental Pollution Department
- Financial Affairs Department

== Activity ==
=== Kuwaiti Fish Death Phenomena ===
On Sunday, September 19, 1999, EPA survey teams discovered large quantities of dead fish along the Salam coast, extending to the National Assembly building, which is a coastal building. A team of technical specialists from various Kuwaiti governmental organizations studied the phenomena and concluded that the ‘Red Tide’ phenomena was to blame.

=== Early Alarm Project to Observe Marine Environment Pollutants ===
The Environment Public Authority has begun the implementation of an intensive program aimed to observe any harmful plankton that may negatively affect the marine environment. The aim of the project was to detect any unnatural changes to reproduction and development of harmful plankton on a qualitative and quantitative scale through studying the distribution and concentration of chlorophyll and other physical factors.

=== Judicial officers ===
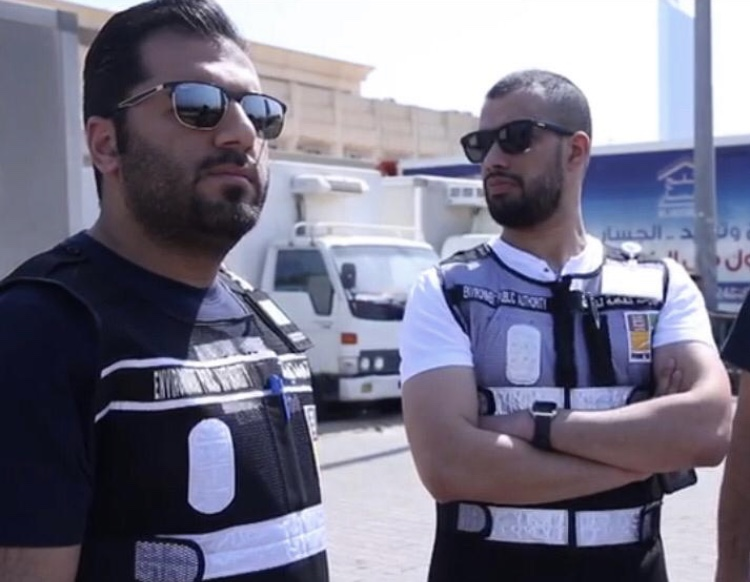
Environmental Judicial Officers at the scene of an environmental crime in Kuwait.

The Environment Public Authority prepares an executive regulation of authority establishment law No. 21/1995 and amended with law No. 16/1996 concerning the environmental requirements, conditions, and standards required for State of Kuwait.

This law brought forth the importance of the environment. It set standards by which all private institutions, citizens, and government institutions were to operate with regards to environmental law and protection of the environment.

=== Ozone layer depletion ===
Kuwait is a country that has committed to the Vienna Convention to protect the Ozone Layer, and the Montreal Protocol concerning exhausted material of Ozone Layer. These conventions brought forth an Ozone layer protection committee that emerged from the Environment Public Authority of Kuwait to analyze and study the provisions of the protocol and convention. The result was a request to issue the following legislative decrees regarding:

- The oversight of the importation of Halogen.
- The establishment of a Halogen bank.
- To provide maintenance facilities with recycling equipment
- The ban of the importance of equipment that include dangerous materials.
- The oversight of the importation process of registered dissolvents.

=== Environmental Police ===
The Environment Public Authority also played a large role in the implementation of a special division within the Kuwaiti Ministry of Interior's police force that is tasked with environmental violations. The development of an 'Environmental Police' is considered the first of its kind in the region.
