= Judicial review in South Africa =

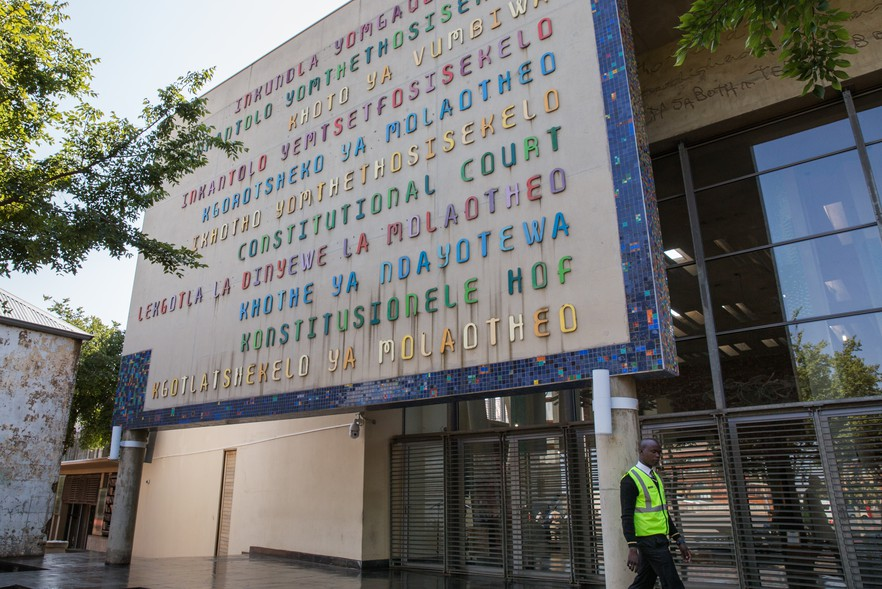
The façade of the Constitutional Court of South Africa

The South African judiciary has broad powers of judicial review under the Constitution of South Africa. Courts are empowered to pronounce on the legality and constitutionality of exercises of public power, including administrative action, executive action, and the passage of acts of Parliament. Though informed by the common law principles that guided judicial review during the apartheid era, contemporary judicial review is authorised by and grounded in constitutional principles. In the case of administrative action, it is also codified in the Promotion of Administrative Justice Act, 2000.

The post-apartheid constitutional transition permitted a significant expansion in judicial review, replacing parliamentary sovereignty and executive prerogative with a framework of constitutional supremacy. In contemporary South African constitutional law, the value of the rule of law is taken to imply the principle of legality, which, akin to the ultra vires doctrine, entails that the courts may invalidate any unlawful exercise of power. The Constitutional Court of South Africa has developed several requirements for the lawful exercise of public power, including an elaborate rationality test. Administrative and executive actions which limit a constitutional right may be tested for their proportionality, while the government's efforts to fulfil its constitutional obligations may be tested for their reasonableness.

These standards have been used to strike down decisions by the President of South Africa, both Houses of Parliament, the provincial legislatures, the Speaker of the National Assembly, and various other public agencies, including the National Prosecuting Authority. The Constitutional Court, in particular, has sometimes been accused of undue judicial activism in the use of its powers of judicial review.

== History ==
In 1903, Chief Justice James Rose Innes held that the courts were responsible for three broad categories of judicial review: review of proceedings in inferior courts; review at common law of the decisions of administrative authorities; and review conducted in terms of special powers granted upon a court or judge by the legislature. (Note: Johannesburg Consolidated Investment Company v Johannesburg Town Council 1903 TS 111 at 115.) Although the South African judiciary retained these functions throughout the 20th century, its powers of judicial review were otherwise severely limited during the apartheid era. In Collins v Minister of the Interior, (Note: Collins v Minister of the Interior and Another 1957 (1) SA 552 (A) 565.) a judgment written by Chief Justice Albert van der Sandt Centlivres in 1956 at the tail-end of the Coloured vote constitutional crisis, the Supreme Court of South Africa severely curtailed its own "testing power" to review acts of the Parliament of South Africa. The Constitution of 1961 did not empower courts to scrutinise statutory provisions, nor did the Constitution of 1983; moreover, neither constitution contained a bill of rights, and each was subject to parliamentary sovereignty and strong executive prerogatives.

During the negotiations to end apartheid, the proper form of judicial review became a central debate in the South African legal establishment. Drawing partly on international models, the constitutional negotiators devised two constitutions – the Interim Constitution of 1994 and the final Constitution of 1996 – which included strong protections for individual rights and for the oversight role of the judiciary. Indeed, in one description, "South Africa consciously adopted judicial review under its Constitution and created a new Constitutional Court entirely dedicated to this responsibility." Among other enabling provisions, section 2 of the Constitution, the so-called supremacy clause, holds explicitly that, "This Constitution is the supreme law of the Republic; law or conduct inconsistent with it is invalid, and the obligations imposed by it must be fulfilled." Thus, in the post-apartheid period, each of the categories of judicial review identified by Innes were augmented. Most significantly, review of administrative action proceeds with statutory codification under the Promotion of Administrative Justice Act, 2000 (PAJA) and with support in the Constitution, and it is complemented by new constitutional grounds for the judicial review of executive and legislative action. Courts also retain certain special powers of review under certain statutes, including the power to review proceedings in and decisions of inferior courts.

== Review under the Constitution ==
The control of public power by the courts through judicial review is and always has been a constitutional matter. Prior to the adoption of the interim Constitution this control was exercised by the courts through the application of common law constitutional principles. Since the adoption of the interim Constitution such control has been regulated by the Constitution which contains express provisions dealing with these matters. The common law principles that previously provided the grounds for judicial review of public power have been subsumed under the Constitution, and in so far as they might continue to be relevant to judicial review, they gain their force from the Constitution. In the judicial review of public power, the two are intertwined and do not constitute separate concepts.

— Pharmaceutical Manufacturers Association, 2000 (Note: Pharmaceutical Manufacturers Association of South Africa and Another: In re Ex Parte President of the Republic of South Africa and Others (CCT31/99) [2000] ZACC 1 at 33–44, 90.)

Under the post-apartheid constitutional dispensation, common-law review of administrative action has been subsumed under the newly expanded framework of constitutional review of exercises of public power. In Pharmaceutical Manufacturers Association: In re Ex Parte President, a landmark judgment handed down in 2000 which defined the post-apartheid landscape in South African administrative law, Justice President Arthur Chaskalson held that, under constitutional supremacy, "all law, including the common law, derives its force from the Constitution and is subject to constitutional control". Or, as Justice Kate O'Regan put it four years later in Bato Star Fishing v Minister, constitutional principles had become "the grundnorm" of administrative law. (Note: Bato Star Fishing (Pty) Ltd v Minister of Environmental Affairs and Tourism and Others (CCT 27/03) [2004] ZACC 15.)

In cases where a statute prescribes particular standards for reviewing particular categories of action, the courts will often prefer to apply that statute. However, courts have also developed non-statutory grounds of review which may be applied to exercises of public power that are not reviewable under any particular statute. In this framework, the judicial review of administrative action is grounded in constitutional law and proceeds according to principles that apply broadly to exercises of public power regardless of whether they are defined strictly as instances of administrative action.

=== Grounds of review ===
==== Principle of legality ====
In respect of the exercise of public powers, the Constitutional Court has developed its power of review primarily through its doctrine on the principle of legality, which it takes to be an "incident" of the rule of law, one of the Constitution's founding values. Contemporary legality review originated in Fedsure Life Assurance v Greater Johannesburg, in which the Constitutional Court explained that, under the new constitutional dispensation, the common law principles of ultra vires "are underpinned (and supplemented where necessary) by a constitutional principle of legality". This principle entails that a public agent:

may only act within the powers lawfully conferred upon it. There is nothing startling in this proposition – it is a fundamental principle of the rule of law, recognised widely, that the exercise of public power is only legitimate where lawful. The rule of law – to the extent at least that it expresses this principle of legality – is generally understood to be a fundamental principle of constitutional law... It seems central to the conception of our constitutional order that the legislature and executive in every sphere are constrained by the principle that they may exercise no power and perform no function beyond that conferred upon them by law. At least in this sense, then, the principle of legality is implied within the terms of the interim Constitution. (Note: Fedsure Life Assurance Ltd and Others v Greater Johannesburg Transitional Metropolitan Council and Others (CCT7/98) [1998] ZACC 17 at 56–59.)

Although Fedsure was decided in 1998 under the Interim Constitution, the principle of legality was reaffirmed and further entrenched after the enactment of the Constitution of 1996, section 1(c) of which explicitly identified the rule of law as a founding constitutional value. In subsequent jurisprudence, the Constitutional Court affirmed several grounds of review arising from the legality principle, beyond the narrow ultra vires requirement not to exceed one's lawful powers. In President v SARFU, the Constitutional Court held per curiam that legality requires that public agents act in good faith and not misconstrue their powers, (Note: President of the Republic of South Africa and Others v South African Rugby Football Union and Others (CCT16/98) [1999] ZACC 11.) while Pharmaceutical Manufacturers formalised the requirement to act rationally rather than arbitrarily as a "minimum threshold requirement applicable to the exercise of all public power". In Simelane, the Constitutional Court additionally held that "procedural rationality" is a ground of legality review, subsidiary to rationality review; (Note: Democratic Alliance v President of South Africa and Others (CCT122/11) [2012] ZACC 24.) although similar to PAJA's requirement of procedural fairness, procedural rationality is distinct and applies to all exercises of public power.

==== Bill of Rights ====
Section 8(1) of the Constitution provides that, "The Bill of Rights applies to all law, and binds the legislature, the executive, the judiciary and all organs of state." Thus, in some other cases, constitutional judicial review does not rely explicitly on the principle of legality but instead relies directly on the court's interpretation of a constitutional right protected by Chapter Two of the Constitution of South Africa. Under section 36 of the Constitution, when the exercise of a public power limits such a right, courts often conduct a so-called limitations exercise to determine whether the limitation of the right is proportionate and justifiable in the circumstances. Before the enactment of PAJA, the right to just administrative action was a notable example of a constitutional right which the court preferred to interpret and apply directly, in that case in reviewing administrative action.

In the case of the socioeconomic rights protected by sections 26 and 27 of the Constitution, the Constitutional Court has emphasised the constitutional provisions directing the state to "take reasonable legislative and other measures, within its available resources, to achieve the progressive realisation" of these rights. In this vein, it has developed a primarily procedural standard of reasonableness to test whether laws, policies, and state actions fulfil this obligation to a constitutionally compliant extent; Government v Grootboom (on the right to housing), (Note: Government of the Republic of South Africa and Others v Grootboom and Others (CCT11/00) [2000] ZACC 19.) Minister of Health v Treatment Action Campaign (on the right of access to healthcare services), (Note: Minister of Health and Others v Treatment Action Campaign and Others (No 2) (CCT8/02) [2002] ZACC 15.) and Mazibuko v City of Johannesburg (on the right of access to water) (Note: Mazibuko and Others v City of Johannesburg and Others (CCT39/09) [2009] ZACC 28.) were landmark cases in that regard.

=== Scope ===
==== Administrative action ====
During apartheid, because of limited accountability safeguards and very limited judicial recourse to challenge executive and legislative action, administrative law was dominated by judicial review of administrative action (including subordinate legislation) according to common-law principles; indeed, this was "virtually the only tool for challenging governmental action". In the post-apartheid period, the definition of "administrative action" has become narrower; as Cora Hoexter points out, the passage of a detailed Bill of Rights meant that the concept no longer had to be "all-encompassing", because, "Much of the work previously done by judicial review in administrative law would henceforth be performed by constitutional rights". At the same time, as Justice President Chaskalson held in Pharmaceutical Manufacturers, post-apartheid judicial review of administrative action no longer emanates from the common law but instead emanates from the text of the Constitution and, since 2000, from the text of PAJA. However, despite these far-reaching changes to the scope and source of review of administrative action, Hoexter argues that judicial review remains the predominant mechanism of administrative law, with few non-judicial pathways available even in the post-apartheid period.

===== Before PAJA =====
In the constitutional era, and even before the enactment of PAJA in 2000, administrative action has been subject to stricter scrutiny than other exercises of public power. The stricter standard of review originates in explicit constitutional protections for the right to administrative justice or "just administrative action", first enshrined in section 24 of the Interim Constitution and then markedly expanded in the final Constitution. Section 33 of the Constitution protects a universal "right to administrative action that is lawful, reasonable and procedurally fair," as well as the right to be furnished with written reasons when one’s rights are "adversely affected by administrative action".

Because neither constitution defined "administrative action", the Constitutional Court was called upon to do so. In an early trilogy of cases, the Constitutional Court held that administrative action excludes legislative action (including a local authority's budgetary resolutions, as in Fedsure), executive action (including the appointment of a commission of inquiry, as in SARFU), and judicial action (including pre-trial investigatory examination, as in Nel v Le Roux). (Note: Nel v Le Roux NO and Others (CCT30/95) [1996] ZACC 6.) Moreover, in SARFU, the court outlined broad factors to be considered in deciding whether an action is administrative, including the source, nature, and subject matter of the underlying power. In Pharmaceutical Manufacturers Association, Justice President Chaskalson found that decisions requiring a "political judgment" (such as the presidential proclamation of an act) are unlikely to be administrative in nature, and, later the same year in Department of Education v Ed-U-College, Justice O'Regan expanded on the distinction between administrative action and executive policy-making. (Note: Permanent Secretary of the Department of Education of the Government of the Eastern Cape Province and Another v Ed-U-College, Port Elizabeth (CCT26/00) [2000] ZACC 23.)

This case law had the effect of narrowing the scope of administrative action, compared to the scope of conduct reviewable at common law during the apartheid era. This notwithstanding, the substitution of section 33 for common-law principles permitted considerable continuity in the grounds of review, because the constitutional requirements of lawfulness, reasonableness, and procedural fairness were familiar common-law principles of administrative law. As Iain Currie observed, "besides the constitutional grounding of the basis for judicial review (and once one is over the constitutional threshold concept of administrative action), the application of the subsumed common-law rules and principles of administrative law proceeded pretty much as it had always done". Moreover, exercises of public power that did not reach the threshold of administrative action – and that therefore did not invoke section 33 – were nonetheless reviewable, and routinely reviewed, under the principle of legality. Indeed, and in any case, in early judgments such as SARFU, Fedsure, and Pharmaceutical Manufacturers, the Constitutional Court developed the principle of legality “so that it increasingly mimicked the usual requirements of administrative law" at common law.

[These cases] show the constitutional principle of legality, part of the Rule of Law, to be a wonderfully useful and flexible device. In the first place it operates as a residual repository of fundamental norms about how public power ought to be used. It thus acts as a kind of safety net, catching exercises of public power that do not qualify as administrative action. Its spread is reassuringly wide: it covers a good deal of the area protected by the administrative justice clause… By telling us that all exercises of public power must comply with standards such as lawfulness, reasonableness and fairness, the principle of legality points away from all this [statutory] conceptualism and parsimony and perversity.

— Cora Hoexter on the utility of the legality principle in judicial review, 2004

===== After PAJA =====
Section 33(3) of the Constitution required the enactment of national legislation to "give effect" to the right to just administrative action and to "provide for the review of administrative action by a court or, where appropriate, an independent and impartial tribunal". In 2000, PAJA was enacted to fulfil that requirement, and section 6 of PAJA set out grounds for judicial review of administrative action. Much of the Constitutional Court's early doctrine on the nature of administrative action was codified in section 1 of PAJA, which defines administrative action, but the definition was also narrowed and, in particular, complicated. Because PAJA sets a more exacting standard of review than the legality principle, state litigants are often eager to establish that their decisions are executive, rather than administrative, in nature; thus PAJA did not preclude a considerable further amount of dispute about the precise nature of administrative action. In Mazibuko, for example, Justice O'Regan held that the installation of prepaid water meters did not amount to administrative action (and therefore was not subject to PAJA), because it was an integral part of a broader water regulation policy and therefore constituted executive action; this finding was criticised by some commentators.

An even greater controversy concerns the primacy of PAJA as a basis for the review of administrative action. With the enactment of PAJA, there exist "two parallel systems of review" for administrative action: ordinary and broad review under the Constitution and the legality principle, and statutory review under PAJA. In principle, PAJA is the "most immediate justification" for, or "primary pathway" to, review of administrative action, though the section 33 right to administrative justice gives PAJA its authority and informs its interpretation. In the earliest articulation of this principle, Justice O'Regan held in Bato Star Fishing that:

The provisions of section 6 [of PAJA] divulge a clear purpose to codify the grounds of judicial review of administrative action as defined in PAJA. The cause of action for the judicial review of administrative action now ordinarily arises from PAJA, not from the common law as in the past. And the authority of PAJA to ground such causes of action rests squarely on the Constitution.

Such a preference for PAJA over the legality principle is in line with the Constitutional Court’s doctrine on the principle of subsidiarity, expressed in SANDU v Minister of Defence (another judgment by O'Regan). Yet, in practice, courts have not always applied PAJA when it is applicable. Indeed, in 2010 in Albutt v Centre for the Study of Violence and Reconciliation, Justice Sandile Ngcobo wrote for a unanimous Constitutional Court that, in cases where the broader legality principle is capable of resolving a dispute, resort to PAJA is "ancillary" and unnecessary. (Note: Albutt v Centre for the Study of Violence and Reconciliation and Others (CCT54/09) [2010] ZACC 4 at 82-83.) Four years later, however, in Minister of Defence v Motau, the Constitutional Court held that, "The correct order of enquiry is to consider, first, whether PAJA applies, and only if it does not, what is demanded by general constitutional principles such as the rule of law"; Justice Sisi Khampepe made this observation in an unobtrusive footnote, without acknowledging that it contradicted Albutt. (Note: Minister of Defence and Military Veterans v Motau and Others (CCT133/13) [2014] ZACC 18 at 27 fn 28.) Lower courts have had similarly mixed views about whether the principle of legality may properly be applied in place of PAJA in the review of administrative action.

==== Executive action ====
The courts' willingness to review and overturn executive action and decisions of the South African government, especially in socioeconomic rights cases such as Grootboom and Treatment Action Campaign, has been described as activist and criticised for intruding on the executive branch's policy-making domain. However, in cases such as Soobramoney v Minister of Health, (Note: Soobramoney v Minister of Health, Kwazulu-Natal (CCT32/97) [1997] ZACC 17.) the Constitutional Court deferred to the government's exclusive prerogative to make policy, and some commentators argue that the reasonableness standard is inherently deferential to the political branches.

Decisions of the President of South Africa have also frequently been subject to judicial review. The Constitutional Court held in an early decision, President v Hugo (on presidential pardons), that "executive powers" include those prerogative powers held by the President of South Africa in his capacity as head of state (rather than head of the executive); that such powers stem from the Constitution alone; and that the exercise of such powers is therefore reviewable for compliance with the Constitution. (Note: President of the Republic of South Africa and Another v Hugo (CCT11/96) [1997] ZACC 4.) In subsequent years, the court reviewed, inter alia, the President's appointment of a commission of inquiry, the President's dismissal of the head of the National Intelligence Agency, (Note: Masetlha v President of the Republic of South Africa and Another (CCT01/07) [2007] ZACC 20.) and the President's appointment of a National Director of Public Prosecutions. In 2019 in President v Democratic Alliance, the opposition Democratic Alliance sought to challenge the dismissal of Finance Minister Pravin Gordhan; the Constitutional Court heard argument on whether the President's appointments to the Cabinet could be subject to judicial review, but the question became moot before judgment was handed down. (Note: President of the Republic of South Africa v Democratic Alliance and Others (CCT159/18) [2019] ZACC 35.)

==== Legislation ====
The first two judgments delivered by the Constitutional Court both involved challenges to the constitutionality of statutes passed by the Parliament of South Africa: both in S v Zuma and in S v Makwanyane, the court struck down provisions of the Criminal Procedure Act, 1977, for inconsistency with provisions of the Interim Constitution. (Note: S v Zuma and Others (CCT5/94) [1995] ZACC 1.) (Note: S v Makwanyane and Another (CCT3/94) [1995] ZACC 3.) During the same period, in an early sign of the reach of judicial review in the post-apartheid period, the Constitutional Court was called upon to review – and initially declined to certify – the final draft of the Constitution of 1996; (Note: Certification of the Constitution of the Republic of South Africa, 1996 (CCT23/96) [1996] ZACC 26.) according to Steven Calabresi, it is the only court ever to decide the constitutionality of a constitution. In subsequent years, judicial review of legislation remained commonplace, and the Constitutional Court invalidated 85 pieces of national legislation between 1995 and 2012, as well as six pieces of provincial legislation. In reviewing the substantive content of legislation, courts have applied diverse standards, including the rational-basis requirement that there should be a rational relationship between the legislative scheme adopted and a legitimate government purpose.

Somewhat more boldly, the Constitutional Court has held that legislative acts may be subject to procedural review and invalidated on the basis that they were passed according to an unconstitutional procedure. In the 2002 matter of United Democratic Movement v President of the Republic, the court reviewed the procedure that had led to the passage of four acts – two statutes and two constitutional amendments – that permitted floor-crossing in South Africa. (Note: United Democratic Movement v President of the Republic of South Africa and Others (CCT23/02) [2002] ZACC 21.) In 2006, in Doctors for Life v Speaker, the court invalidated two acts on the basis that the National Council of Provinces had failed to fulfil its constitutional obligation to facilitate public involvement in the law-making process. (Note: Doctors for Life International v Speaker of the National Assembly and Others (CCT12/05) [2006] ZACC 11.)

==== Parliamentary processes ====
The breadth and rigour of South African judicial review of internal parliamentary procedures is "highly unorthodox by comparative standards". For example, in 2012 and 2013, the Constitutional Court handed down judgment in two cases in which it demonstrated a willingness to review the constitutionality of Parliament's internal procedural rules. Both in Oriani-Ambrosini v Sisulu and in Mazibuko v Sisulu, the court invalidated internal rules of the National Assembly for violating the constitutional rights of opposition party Members of Parliament. (Note: Oriani-Ambrosini, MP v Sisulu, MP, Speaker of the National Assembly (CCT16/12) [2012] ZACC 27.) (Note: Mazibuko v Sisulu and Another (CCT115/12) [2013] ZACC 28.) This development was criticised by commentators who regarded it as infringing upon parliamentary autonomy and therefore upon the separation of powers.

Still more controversial was a series of judgments handed down during the second term of President Jacob Zuma, which related to the manner in which Parliament elected to discharge its function of holding the executive branch accountable. In United Democratic Movement v Speaker, another case involving the National Assembly's internal procedures, the court declined to prescribe a secret ballot in a parliamentary vote of no confidence, but held unanimously that, per Chief Justice Mogoeng:

There must always be a proper and rational basis for whatever choice the Speaker makes in the exercise of the constitutional power to determine the voting procedure... The exercise of that power must be duly guided by the need to enable effective accountability, what is in the best interests of the people and obedience to the Constitution. (Note: United Democratic Movement v Speaker of the National Assembly and Others (CCT89/17) [2017] ZACC 21 at 88–90.)

Shortly afterwards, in the related matter of Economic Freedom Fighters v Speaker II, the court overturned an unsuccessful motion to impeach Zuma and held that it should be re-run under an improved procedure; in his dissenting opinion, Chief Justice Mogoeng Mogoeng famously called this judgment "a textbook case of judicial overreach". (Note: Economic Freedom Fighters and Others v Speaker of the National Assembly and Another (CCT76/17) [2017] ZACC 47 at 223.)

==== Prosecutorial discretion ====
In 2012, asked to review the discontinuation of President Zuma's corruption prosecution, the Supreme Court of Appeal ruled that, though it does not constitute administrative action under PAJA, the exercise of prosecutorial discretion by the National Prosecuting Authority is subject to review under the principle of legality. (Note: Democratic Alliance and Others v Acting National Director of Public Prosecutions and Others (288/11) [2012] ZASCA 15.)

== Review under statute ==
The legislature may and often does confer on the courts a statutory power of review. As Acting Judge of Appeal Belinda van Heerden recognised in Nel v Master, the extent of this power depends on the statutory provision in question; it may be a wider than ordinary review, and thus more akin to an appeal, or it may be narrower, with the court confined to particular grounds of review or particular remedies. (Note: Nel NO and Another v Master of the High Court Eastern Cape and Others (A9/03) [2004] ZASCA 26.) Examples of special statutory review include the review of decisions made in terms of the Promotion of Access to Information Act, 2000; the review of decisions made by the Master of the High Court in terms of section 151 of the Insolvency Act, 1936; and the provision in section 145 of the Labour Relations Act, 1995 for review of arbitration awards made by the Commission for Conciliation, Mediation and Arbitration. The review of private voluntary arbitration takes place in terms of section 33(1) of the Arbitration Act, 1965.

=== Promotion of Administrative Justice Act ===
Enacted in 2000 to give effect to the section 33 right to just administrative action, PAJA outlines the requirements of administrative justice as statutory grounds of judicial review of administrative decisions. State conduct which qualifies as administrative action in terms of PAJA is subject to a dual regime of review: statutory review under PAJA, and ordinary review under the Constitution. Drawing on Pharmaceutical Manufacturers, on the role of common law in informing constitutional interpretation, Justice O'Regan held in Bato Star that the common law would "inform the provisions of PAJA".

=== Review of inferior courts ===
Among the functions excluded from the statutory definition of administrative action, and therefore from review under PAJA, are the "judicial functions of a judicial officer". However, as confirmed in Pretoria Portland Cement v Competition Commission, (Note: Pretoria Portland Cement Company Ltd. and Another v Competition Commission and Others (64/2001) [2002] ZASCA 63.) judicial officers performing non-judicial functions may take administrative action which is reviewable under PAJA. Moreover, other statute provides for the judicial review of decisions and proceedings in inferior courts.

==== Review of proceedings ====
South African criminal procedure and civil procedure have long afforded superior courts the power to review the proceedings of inferior courts in their jurisdiction, a power originating in the prerogative writs of English law. Outlining the tripartite structure of judicial review in 1903, Chief Justice Innes called this form of review the "most usual" form, "the process by which, apart from appeal, the proceedings of inferior courts of justice, both civil and criminal, are brought before this court in respect of grave irregularities or illegalities occurring during the course of such proceedings". For Hennie Erasmus, the "essence of the distinction" between appeal and review is that "review concerns the regularity and validity of the proceedings under review, whereas appeal concerns the correctness or otherwise of the decision being assailed on appeal." In particular, an appeal is the natural course where a ground for review is apparent from the court record, because an appeal is bound by the record of the inferior court. Review may refer to matter not appearing in the record but introduced by affidavit.

Judicial review of the proceedings of inferior courts was first codified in statute in the Cape Colony's Charter of Justice of 1828. In subsequent decades, section 19 of the Supreme Court Act, 1959, granted the power to provincial divisions of the Supreme Court, applying to "all inferior courts" within the provincial division (most significantly magistrate's courts); section 24 set out the grounds of review. In the post-apartheid period, the Superior Courts Act, 2013, which repealed the Supreme Court Act, preserved the power of divisions of the High Court of South Africa to review the proceedings of all magistrate's courts within their jurisdiction (a slightly narrower power than the earlier power applying to "all inferior courts"). Under section 22(1) of the Superior Courts Act, grounds of such review are absence of jurisdiction on the part of the court; conflict of interest, bias, malice or corruption on the part of the presiding judicial officer; gross irregularity in the proceedings; and the admission of inadmissible or incompetent evidence or the rejection of admissible or competent evidence.

==== Automatic review ====
Certain statutes provide for the automatic review or "review in the ordinary course" of the decisions of magistrates or other judicial officers. Such review is not initiated by an aggrieved individual through the rules of court but instead has a statutory trigger. Most significantly, sections 302 to 304 of the Criminal Procedure Act provide for the automatic review by the High Court of certain criminal sentences imposed by magistrates. Section 85 of the Child Justice Act, 2008, broadens the application of these sections in the case of juvenile offenders. Separately, the Extension of Security of Tenure Act, 1997, confers on the Land Claims Court the power to review eviction orders granted in the magistrate's courts. Automatic review is generally considered a sui generis procedure: though a form of review, it closely resembles an automatic appeal, insofar as the grounds of review are not restricted to procedural irregularities.

== See also ==
- Constitutional democracy
- Constitutional litigation in South Africa
- Law of South Africa
