= South African constitutional law =

Legal interpretation and application of the Constitution

South African constitutional law is the area of South African law relating to the interpretation and application of the Constitution of the Republic of South Africa by the country's courts. All laws of South Africa must conform with the Constitution; any laws inconsistent with the Constitution have no force or effect.

== Constitutions ==
South Africa is generally considered to have had five constitutional documents since the Union was established in 1910, including the current one. The constitutions in chronological order are:

- South Africa Act 1909
- Constitution of South Africa, 1961 (also known as the "Republican Constitution")
- Constitution of South Africa, 1983 (also known as the "Tricameral Constitution")
- Constitution of South Africa, 1993 (also known as the "Interim Constitution")
- Constitution of South Africa, 1996 (also known as the "Final Constitution")

The Interim Constitution abolished South Africa's system of parliamentary sovereignty and replaced it with a dispensation wherein the Constitution is the supreme law, as opposed to the will of Parliament. The previous three constitutions were all subject to parliamentary amendment with, generally, a simple majority, therefore were not considered extraordinary statutes.

== Doctrines of constitutional application ==
=== Constitutional supremacy ===
This Constitution is the supreme law of the Republic; law or conduct inconsistent with it is invalid, and the obligations imposed by it must be fulfilled.

— Constitution of 1996, section 2

Section 2 of the Constitution of 1996, the so-called supremacy clause, excludes parliamentary sovereignty and, in the extra-curial words of Justice Kate O'Regan, "shifts the foundations of our legal system". Section 2 holds that all law or conduct inconsistent with the Constitution is invalid, and various supporting provisions explicitly bind public agents to compliance with the Constitution. One consequence of this was to introduce a very far-reaching system of judicial review in South Africa; early influential judgments in that regard were President v Hugo, (Note: President of the Republic of South Africa and Another v Hugo 1997 (4) SA 1 (CC).) Fedsure Life Assurance v Johannesburg, (Note: Fedsure Life Assurance Ltd and Others v Greater Johannesburg Transitional Metropolitan Council and Others 1999 (1) SA 374 (CC).) and, in particular, Pharmaceutical Manufacturers Association: In re Ex Parte President, in which, in the process of holding that administrative action is reviewable for its constitutionality, Justice President Arthur Chaskalson wrote that under constitutional supremacy, "all law, including the common law, derives its force from the Constitution and is subject to constitutional control". (Note: Pharmaceutical Manufacturers Association of South Africa and Another: In re Ex Parte President of the Republic of South Africa and Others 2000 (2) SA 674 (CC).)

Separately from the supremacy clause, the Constitution also mentions the "supremacy of the constitution", in section 1(c) and alongside the rule of law, as one of the founding values of the Republic. Frank Michelman has argued that the supremacy clause and the supremacy value have different constitutional functions: the first "lays down constitutional supremacy as a rule for the construction of a determinate, hierarchical relation among legal norms emanating from various, recognised sources of law", and the second presents a normative vision or "value of legal-systemic harmony in the service of the vision of the good society staked out by the entire list of founding values set forth" elsewhere in section 1. In this connection, Michelman cites Carmichele v Minister, which described the Constitution as "not merely a formal document regulating public power" but instead as embodying "an objective, normative value system", within the "matrix" of which the common law must be developed. (Note: Carmichele v Minister of Safety and Security 2001 (4) SA 938 (CC).)

=== Principle of avoidance ===
In South Africa, the principle of constitutional avoidance is a principle of decisional minimalism which implies a preference for declining to adjudicate constitutional questions that are not decisive for the dispute under consideration. It originates in S v Mhlungu, in which Acting Justice Sydney Kentridge wrote in a minority opinion of his support for "the general principle that, where it is possible to decide any case, civil or criminal, without reaching a constitutional issue, that is the course which should be followed." (Note: S v Mhlungu and Others 1995 (3) SA 867 (CC).) Later the same year, the Constitutional Court endorsed that principle unanimously in Zantsi v Council of State, Ciskei. (Note: Zantsi v Council of State, Ciskei and Others 1995 (4) SA 615 (CC).)

In Zantsi, Justice President Chaskalson quoted approvingly from Liverpool, New York & Philadelphia Steamship Co. v. Commissioners of Emigration, a United States Supreme Court case in which Justice Stanley Matthews advised never to "anticipate a question of constitutional law in advance of the necessity of deciding it" or "formulate a rule of constitutional law broader than is required by the precise facts to which it is to be applied". For Chaskalson, the American "salutary rule" of constitutional avoidance:

allows the law to develop incrementally. In view of the far-reaching implications attaching to constitutional decisions, it is a rule which should ordinarily be adhered to by this and all other South African Courts before whom constitutional issues are raised... It is not ordinarily desirable for a Court to give rulings in the abstract on issues which are not the subject of controversy and are only of academic interest.

For Iain Currie and Johan de Waal, the principle of avoidance ensures that courts do not create a "constitutional straitjacket" which unnecessarily prohibits the political branches of government from interpreting and developing the law. Moreover, and more practically, Mhlungu and Zantsi were handed down under the Interim Constitution, during which time the Constitutional Court had exclusive jurisdiction over constitutional matters; the principle of avoidance therefore discouraged lower courts from referring irrelevant issues to the Constitutional Court on the grounds that they had constitutional implications. Under the Constitution of 1996, that procedural incentive has dissipated, and the most prominent contemporary consequence of the principle of avoidance is for statutory interpretation in the context of South African constitutional litigation. When the constitutionality of a statutory provision is in doubt, a court will generally prefer to resolve that doubt by interpreting the statute in a manner which makes it constitutionally compliant, if such an interpretation is reasonably available. The court thereby exercises its section 39(2) power to interpret law in light of constitutional values, instead of the more obtrusive section 172(1) power to invalidate law.

However, the principle of avoidance – especially Zantsi's broader formulation of it – has also been linked to more general and more "pernicious" practices of judicial restraint, especially in respect of the courts' putative reluctance to develop jurisprudence on the content of socioeconomic rights. Several commentators, following Lourens du Plessis, view what others call the principle of avoidance as one strand of a broader doctrine of "adjudicative subsidiarity" (distinct from institutional subsidiarity), which orders the primacy of different legal norms or sources of law when more than one is applicable to a given situation. According to du Plessis, South African adjudicative subsidiarity theory has developed such that, in constitutional adjudication, more particular, indirect norms are preferred over more general and direct norms.

=== Principle of subsidiarity ===
There are several notions of "subsidiarity" in South African law, among them notions of subsidiarity in international law and in concurrent provincial competences. However, in rights-based litigation, the principle of subsidiarity governs the way in which litigants may invoke the Constitution to secure enforcement of a constitutional right, and, in particular, limits the circumstances in which a litigant may rely directly on – or seek direct enforcement of – a constitutional right. The principle holds that, when Parliament enacts legislation to give effect to a constitutional right, an aggrieved party must rely on that legislation rather than resorting directly to the underlying constitutional provision as a cause of action. He is excluded from claiming direct enforcement of the right, but instead may challenge the constitutional validity of the legislation on the basis that it does not adequately protect that right. Justice Edwin Cameron summarised the principle as:

the norm that a litigant cannot directly invoke the Constitution to extract a right he or she seeks to enforce without first relying on, or attacking the constitutionality of, legislation enacted to give effect to that right... Once legislation to fulfil a constitutional right exists, the Constitution's embodiment of that right is no longer the prime mechanism for its enforcement. The legislation is primary. The right in the Constitution plays only a subsidiary or supporting role. (Note: My Vote Counts NPC v Speaker of the National Assembly and Others 2016 (1) SA 132 (CC).)

The Constitutional Court first articulated the subsidiarity principle clearly in SANDU v Minister of Defence, in which it held unanimously that, per Justice O'Regan, "a litigant who seeks to assert his or her right to engage in collective bargaining under section 23(5) should in the first place base his or her case on any legislation enacted to regulate the right, not on section 23(5)". (Note: South African National Defence Union v Minister of Defence and Others 2007 (5) SA 400 (CC).) O'Regan argued that to rely directly on the constitutional provision, bypassing the legislation, would be to fail to respect the legislative branch's role in fulfilling constitutional rights. In Minister of Health v New Clicks, Justice Sandile Ngcobo made the same point and added that direct rights enforcement would encourage the development of "two parallel systems of law" (one made by the courts and the other made by the legislature). (Note: Minister of Health and Another v New Clicks South Africa (Pty) Ltd and Others 2006 (2) SA 311 (CC).) For Karl Klare, the principle's "raison d'être" is "to strike an authoritative balance between the conflicting values of judicial deference and constitutional supremacy, so that courts are not at large weighing the conflict on an ad hoc, case-by-case basis."

Other than collective bargaining rights, rights governed by the subsidiarity principle include the section 32 right of access to information and section 33 right to administrative justice: the Promotion of Access to Information Act 2 of 2000 (PAIA) and Promotion of Administrative Justice Act 3 2000 (PAJA), respectively, were the result of the Constitution's explicit directive, in sections 32(2) and 33(3), to enact national legislation "to give effect" to the section 32 and 33 rights. New Clicks and Bato Star Fishing v Minister both affirmed the primacy of PAJA as a cause of action over the section 33 right and related common-law norms, (Note: Bato Star Fishing (Pty) Ltd v Minister of Environmental Affairs and Tourism and Others 2004 (4) SA 490 (CC).) while My Vote Counts v Speaker confirmed the primacy of PAIA over the section 32 right. Likewise, the Constitutional Court held in MEC v Pillay that the Promotion of Equality and Prevention of Unfair Discrimination Act 4 of 2000 takes precedence over section 9 in the enforcement of the right against unfair discrimination, since the Act was designed to effectuate that right in terms of by section 9(4) of the Constitution. (Note: MEC for Education, Kwazulu-Natal and Others v Pillay 2007 (2) SA 106 (CC).)

My Vote Counts also contained extensive discussion of the implications of the subsidiarity principle in light of the Constitutional Court's exclusive jurisdiction to determine whether the political branches have failed to fulfil a constitutional obligation. The majority affirmed that, in such cases, subsidiarity dictated that the constitutional obligation at issue was the state's obligation to enact some legislation that intended and purported to give effect to the relevant right, an obligation which the passage of PAIA fulfilled; the further question, of whether such legislation did in fact give adequate effect to the right, did not invoke the Constitutional Court's exclusive jurisdiction and must be deferred to a frontal challenge to the statute.

Some analyses link the subsidiarity principle to the avoidance principle as another instantiation, under du Plessis's adjudicative subsidiarity, of the general norm that "a court should not protect a constitutional right by way of a direct validity attack or by way of a direct constitutional remedy before considering whether the legislation or common law in question could be interpreted in a constitution-conforming and -confirming way". In his minority opinion in My Vote Counts, Justice Cameron himself implied support for this view, suggesting that the shared underlying premise is that, "resort to constitutional rights and values may [not] be freewheeling or haphazard."

== Doctrines of constitutional adjudication ==
=== Separation of powers ===
{{ALL RASCIST BUSINESSES WITH RSA GOVERNMENT MUST DECLARE TO AD HOCK COMMITY, TREASON TRAILS, COMPLETE FINANCIAL REVIEW, PUNISHMENT FOR TREASON CHARGE FOR USING BEE MUST BE EXCILED OR DECLARE 70% ASSETS TOWARDS EMPOWERING THE CITIZEN. EQUAL REPUBLIC MEANS CITIZEN CAN ALL WORK FOR RSA. IF CITIZEN IS SPECIAL BEE BEFORE IT BECOME SPECIAL CITIZEN IN RSA OF DEMOCRACATIC EQUALITY, ADHOCH TRAIL EXTRA JUST TO BE SURE. THE NEW CITIZEN NOW NEEDS FUNDING FOR NEW CITIZEN MISSION. 18 NOVEMBER 2025}}

== See also ==
- Constitutional Court of South Africa cases
