= Nel v Le Roux =

South African legal case

- Court: Constitutional Court of South Africa
- Full case name: Nel v Le Roux NO and Others
- Decided: 4 April 1996
- Docket nos.: CCT 30/95
- Citations: [1996] ZACC 6; 1996 (4) BCLR 592; 1996 (3) SA 562

Case history
- Prior actions: Referral from the Supreme Court of South Africa, Witwatersrand Local Division

Court membership
- Judges sitting: Chaskalson P, Mahomed DP, Ackermann, Didcott, Kriegler, Langa, Madala, Mokgoro, O'Regan and Sachs JJ

Case opinions
- The provisions of section 205 of the Criminal Procedure Act 51 of 1977 are not inconsistent with the Interim Constitution.
- Decision by: Ackermann J (unanimous)

Nel v Le Roux NO and Others is a 1996 decision of the Constitutional Court of South Africa in the area of criminal procedure. The Constitutional Court dismissed a constitutional challenge to section 205 of the Criminal Procedure Act 51 of 1977, which allowed judicial officers to compel witnesses to provide evidence in pre-trial examinations. The court held unanimously that the summary imprisonment of recalcitrant witnesses in section 205 examinations was consistent with the Interim Constitution. In particular, the court found that the relevant sentencing procedure was neither criminal nor administrative in nature, so it was governed neither by the right to a fair trial nor by the right to just administrative action. The judgment was written by Justice Laurie Ackermann on behalf of a unanimous court.

== Background ==
Section 205(1) of the Criminal Procedure Act 51 of 1977 (CPA) provides that, at the request of public prosecutors, judges and magistrates may compel individuals to appear for examination by prosecutors, provided that such persons are deemed "likely to give material or relevant information as to any alleged offence, whether or not it is known by whom the offence was committed". Section 205(2) incorporates by reference section 189(1) of the CPA, which provides for the summary imprisonment of recalcitrant witnesses. In the context of section 205 examinations, a person who refuses or fails to provide prosecutors with the desired information may be sentenced to imprisonment summarily "unless the person so refusing or failing has a just excuse for his refusal or failure".

In March 1995, the applicant, Jan Kemp Nel, was served with a subpoena in terms of section 205(1). The subpoena required him to appear in the Magistrate's Court to be examined in connection with pending criminal charges against an associate, Herbert Hoogakker, who had been charged with fraud and contraventions of exchange control regulations. The subpoena alerted Nel that he was required to provide information concerning, inter alia, his association with Hoogakker and his acquisition of a property in Spain. Nel believed that his answers to this line of questioning would expose him to civil forfeitures in terms of the exchange control regulations.

Nel challenged the constitutionality of section 205 of the CPA, asserting that it violated various of his rights under the Interim Constitution. The Witwatersrand Local Division of the Supreme Court of South Africa referred the matter to the Constitutional Court, which heard argument on 20 February 1996 and handed down judgment on 4 April 1996.

== Judgment ==
Writing on behalf of a unanimous court, Justice Laurie Ackermann dismissed the application, finding that section 205 of the CPA was consistent with the Interim Constitution. Moreover, Ackermann chastised the applicant for his framing of the constitutional issue, arguing that if the litigants had "applied their minds", the Constitutional Court would have heard the matter as a challenge to section 189 of the CPA, which was more to the point than section 205.

Ackermann's judgment dealt most substantially with Nel's arguments on the basis of the right to a fair trial and right to administrative justice. Although Nel's application invoked several other constitutional rights, two of those rights were not pursued in argument. Further, Ackermann dismissed the invocation of several other rights, including the right against self-incrimination and the right to be presumed innocent, on the basis that those rights were not reached under a proper reading of section 189(1) of the CPA and particularly the "just excuse" exception therein. Properly interpreted, the procedure only compelled Nel to provide the desired information if he did not have a just excuse for doing so. If the questioning had unjustifiably threatened his constitutional rights, including his right against self-incrimination, that would constitute a just excuse for refusing to answer under section 189(1).

=== Fair trial rights ===
Nel contended that the summary sentencing procedure violated his right not to be detained without trial under section 11(1) of the Interim Constitution, as well as his right to a fair trial under section 25(3) of the Interim Constitution. However, the court found that the right to a fair trial extends only to accused persons, and that persons detained under the summary compulsion procedure are not accused persons: the section 189(1) proceedings are not criminal proceedings, nor do they result in a criminal conviction or criminal sentence. On the other hand, such persons are entitled to the section 11(1) protection against detention without trial, but section 189(1) detentions do not constitute detention without trial: adequate procedural safeguards are in place.

=== Administrative justice ===
Section 24 of the Interim Constitution protected the right to procedurally fair, lawful, and justifiable administrative action, and Nel contended that the summary sentencing procedure violated this right. However, the court found that the summary sentencing procedure in section 189 of the CPA did not constitute administrative action; instead, it is "clearly" judicial action, especially since it is subject to appeal. Moreover, Ackermann was hesitant to apply section 24 rights to the section 205 proceedings more broadly:

I have grave doubts whether section 24 is applicable at all to section 205 proceedings, since their aim is limited to the gathering of factual information; in fact they constitute no more than a mechanism for compelling a witness statement.

== Reception ==
Ackermann's judgment was criticised for its narrow conception of the section 11(1) and 25(3) rights. Commentators have argued that the court's finding on the scope of section 25(3) results in a situation in which persons are afforded constitutional protection in inverse proportion to the "arbitrariness or informality" of the sentencing proceedings.

In administrative law, the judgment was significant for its affirmation that judicial action does not constitute administrative action for the purposes of section 24.
