= My Vote Counts v Minister of Justice and Correctional Services =

South African legal case

- Court: Constitutional Court of South Africa
- Full case name: My Vote Counts NPC v Minister of Justice and Correctional Services and Another
- Decided: 21 June 2018
- Docket nos.: CCT 249/17
- Citations: [2018] ZACC 17; 2018 (8) BCLR 893 (CC); 2018 (5) SA 380 (CC)

Case history
- Prior actions: My Vote Counts v President [2017] ZAWCHC 105; 2018 (2) SACR 644 (WCC) in the High Court of South Africa, Western Cape Division

Court membership
- Judges sitting: Mogoeng CJ, Zondo DCJ, Froneman J, Jafta J, Khampepe J, Madlanga J, Theron J, Cachalia AJ, Dlodlo AJ, Goliath AJ and Petse AJ

Case opinions
- Access to information on the private funding of political parties is essential for the effective exercise of political rights. The Promotion of Access to Information Act, 2000 is unconstitutional insofar as it fails to provide for such access.
- Decision by: Mogoeng CJ (Zondo DCJ, Jafta J, Khampepe J, Madlanga J, Theron J, Dlodlo AJ, Goliath AJ and Petse AJ concurring)
- Concurrence: Froneman J (Cachalia AJ concurring)

Keywords
- Political party funding; Promotion of Access to Information Act, 2000; right of access to information; right to an informed vote; right to vote; section 7(2) of the Constitution; section 19 of the Constitution; section 32 of the Constitution; transparency, accountability, openness

My Vote Counts NPC v Minister of Justice and Correctional Services and Another is a decision in the Constitutional Court of South Africa which established a constitutional right of access to information about the sources of political party funding. The court held unanimously that the Promotion of Access to Information Act, 2000 was inconsistent with the Constitution insofar as it failed to give effect to that right. The matter was heard on 13 March 2018 and decided on 21 June 2018, with a majority judgment written by Chief Justice Mogoeng Mogoeng.

== Background ==
In the 2015 matter of My Vote Counts v Speaker of the National Assembly, the non-profit My Vote Counts approached the Constitutional Court of South Africa with an application to compel the Parliament of South Africa to pass legislation that would oblige political parties to disclose the sources of their private funding. That application failed insofar as it was couched in terms of the constitutional right of access to information, which is regulated by the Promotion of Access to Information Act, 2000 (PAIA); a majority of the Constitutional Court held that, under the principle of subsidiarity, My Vote Counts was required to lodge a frontal challenge the constitutionality of PAIA rather than rely directly on the constitutional right which PAIA aims to effectuate.

In the aftermath of that judgment, My Vote Counts lodged requests with various political parties, asking in terms of PAIA for information about the sources of the parties' private funding. Some of the parties declined those requests, arguing that PAIA did not cover such disclosures from political parties. This triggered an application by My Vote Counts to the High Court of South Africa, in which it sought to challenge the constitutional validity of PAIA insofar as PAIA failed to mandate the disclosure of private party funding. Judge Shehnaz Meer of the Western Cape High Court found in its favour on 27 September 2017, and her order of constitutional invalidity was referred to the Constitutional Court for confirmation; My Vote Counts also appealed the High Court's refusal to declare that PAIA should require "continuous and systematic" disclosure of information on party funding.

== Arguments ==
It was common cause among the disputants that PAIA was the act of national legislation intended to regulate and give effect to the right of access to information. My Vote Counts argued, and the High Court agreed, that PAIA was inconsistent with the Constitution insofar as it failed to fulfil the imperative of promoting access to information on the private funding of political parties and independent candidates. According to their application, this imperative arises from a joint reading of sections 7(2), 19, and 32 of the Constitution: the meaningful exercise of the political rights provided in section 19 depends on access to information about political finance, and section 32 compels Parliament to give effect to the right of access to "any information that is held by another person and that is required for the exercise or protection of any rights". Compliance with section 32 therefore requires that Parliament pass legislation to provide for public access to information about party funding.

The application was opposed by the Minister of Justice and Correctional Services, who contended that PAIA made adequate provision for the disclosure of information about the private funding of political parties and independent candidates.

== Judgment ==
On 21 June 2018, in a majority judgment written by Chief Justice Mogoeng Mogoeng, the Constitutional Court confirmed the order of constitutional invalidity made by the Western Cape High Court. Preserving the substance of Meer's order, the Constitutional Court declared that:

- "information on the private funding of political parties and independent candidates is essential for the effective exercise of the right to make political choices and to participate in the elections."
- "information on private funding of political parties and independent candidates must be recorded, preserved and made reasonably accessible."
- PAIA "is invalid to the extent of its inconsistency with the Constitution by failing to provide for the recordal, preservation and reasonable disclosure of information on the private funding of political parties and independent candidates."

The majority agreed with the reasoning of My Vote Counts, holding that there was a vital connection between the right to vote and the right of access to information, insofar as the meaningful exercise of political rights must be an informed exercise of the same. Parliament was ordered to amend PAIA, and to "take any other measure it deems appropriate to provide for the recordal, preservation and facilitation of reasonable access to information on the private funding of political parties and independent candidates", within 18 months.

However, the court refused My Vote Count's appeal on the matter of ordering "continuous and systematic" disclosure; again agreeing with the High Court, the majority held that such an order would trench on the separation of powers, insofar as it would go beyond requiring Parliament to fulfil a right to prescribing the manner in which Parliament should legislate.

In a brief separate concurrence, in which Acting Justice Azhar Cachalia concurred, Justice Johan Froneman reflected on several tangential issues, including the implementation of the court's order and the notion of participatory democracy, which he said would be weakened not only if individual voters were uninformed but also if civil society and media institutions were uninformed.

== Reactions ==
Civil society organisations, including the South African National Editors' Forum and amaBhungane, welcomed the decision.

In June 2020, President Cyril Ramaphosa signed into law the Promotion of Access to Information Amendment Act, 2019, which gives effect to the decision.
