= S v Mlonyeni =

S v Mlonyeni, an important case in South African criminal procedure, was an appeal against the convictions of the appellants on two charges of murder in connection with traditional witch-craft practices and the modern method of 'necklace' killings.

The court held that the provisions of s144(3)(a)(i) of the Criminal Procedure Act, 1977 are explicitly to the effect that the State is not bound by the contents of the summary of substantial facts.

There is, therefore, no obligation on the State to seek an amendment to its summary, whether before or after it leads evidence which may be in conflict therewith.

If it does seek such an amendment before the leading of evidence, it is to the advantage, and not to the prejudice, of the defense in at least two respects:

1. it warns the defense that the summary is incorrect; and
2. it provides ammunition for the cross-examination of witnesses who may have furnished the information on which the summary was based.

As the State is not bound by the summary and is not precluded from leading evidence at variance with such summary, the question whether the court has the power to permit the amendment of the summary of substantial facts is largely academic.
