= S v Hendrix =

South African legal case

S v Hendrix, an important case in South African criminal procedure, dealt with s119 of the Criminal Procedure Act, 1977. The court held that this section and the rest of Chapter 19 do not, where the accused pleads not guilty, envisage a trial, nor that anything more shall be held than a preliminary enquiry in order to clarify the matters in respect of which the State and the accused are at issue.

It is necessary for a "charge" to be put to the accused in order for him to know what the State case against him is eventually going to be. It is necessary for him to "plead" to that charge to indicate what his answer to that charge is.

If his plea is one of guilty, then there is provision for the proceedings to continue to finality.

If his plea is one of not guilty then the proceedings thereafter are not trial proceedings.

Accordingly, the rule that an accused person is entitled to a verdict once he has pleaded has no application as the provision of s106(4) of the CPA relates only to the situation where an accused person pleads to a charge in a court which is trying him on that charge.
