= My Vote Counts v Speaker of the National Assembly =

South African legal case

- Court: Constitutional Court of South Africa
- Full case name: My Vote Counts NPC v Speaker of the National Assembly and Others
- Decided: 30 September 2015
- Docket nos.: CCT 121/14
- Citation: [2015] ZACC 31

Court membership
- Judges sitting: Mogoeng CJ, Moseneke DCJ, Cameron J, Froneman J, Khampepe J, Madlanga J, Nkabinde J, Jappie AJ, Theron AJ, Molemela AJ, Tshiqi AJ

Case opinions
- Decision by: Khampepe J, Madlanga J, Nkabinde J, and Theron AJ (Mogoeng CJ, Molemela AJ and Tshiqi AJ concurring)
- Dissent: Cameron J (Moseneke DCJ, Froneman J and Jappie AJ concurring)

Keywords
- Exclusive jurisdiction; political party funding; principle of subsidiarity; Promotion of Access to Information Act, 2000; right of access to information; right to vote; section 19(3) of the Constitution; section 32 of the Constitution; section 167(4)(e) of the Constitution

In My Vote Counts NPC v Speaker of the National Assembly and Others, the Constitutional Court of South Africa dismissed an application which sought to compel Parliament to pass legislation mandating the disclosure of political party funding information. Split seven to four, the court held that the application transgressed the principle of subsidiarity and separation of powers.

The matter was heard on 10 February 2015 and decided on 30 September 2015. The application by My Vote Counts, a non-profit organisation, posited an interaction between two constitutional rights – the section 32 right to access to information and the section 19 right to vote – which it argued imposed a constitutional obligation on Parliament to make legislation promoting systematic transparency in party funding. While the minority endorsed this argument, the majority declined to evaluate its merit. According to the majority, the applicant's complaint was justiciable only as a challenge to the constitutionality of the Promotion of Access to Information Act 2 of 2000, which regulated the right of access to information, and any such challenge should be heard by a lower court.

== Background and arguments ==
The non-profit My Vote Counts approached the Constitutional Court with a request that the court should compel the Parliament of South Africa to pass legislation that would oblige political parties to disclose the sources of their private funding. The application rested on section 32 of the Constitution, which provides the right of access to information. In particular, section 32(1)(b) grants everyone the right of access to "any information that is held by another person and that is required for the exercise or protection of any rights", and section 32(2) obliges Parliament to enact legislation to give effect to that right. Represented by David Unterhalter SC, My Vote Counts argued that the exercise of the constitutional right to vote (section 19) rested on access to information about party funding sources, and that the constitutional right of access to information therefore required the systematic disclosure of such information to the public.

The application was opposed by the presiding officers of Parliament – the Speaker of the National Assembly and the Chairperson of the National Council of Provinces – represented by Wim Trengove SC. Parliament argued that there was no need to enact specific legislation to fulfil the purpose sought by My Vote Counts, because existing legislation promoted accountable and transparent governance and access to information. In particular, the Promotion of Access to Information Act 2 of 2000 (PAIA) regulated the section 32 right to know and provided for citizens to request information about the sources of political parties' private funding. My Vote Counts contended that PAIA was not sufficient to fulfil Parliament's constitutional obligation, because it did not require proactive and regular disclosure of the relevant information.

== Majority judgment ==
Handing down judgment on 30 September 2015, a majority of the Constitutional Court dismissed the application on the technical grounds of the principle of subsidiarity as affirmed in SANDU v Minister of Defence and elsewhere. In a judgment co-written by Justice Sisi Khampepe, Justice Mbuyiseli Madlanga, Justice Bess Nkabinde, and Acting Justice Leona Theron, the majority held that PAIA was the legislation intended to give effect to the constitutional right of access to information. The essence of the complaint by My Vote Counts was therefore a complaint about the putative constitutional shortcomings of PAIA. Under the principle of subsidiarity, My Votes Counts was required to challenge the constitutional validity of that legislation – in the High Court of South Africa – instead of relying directly on the constitutional right which the legislation was enacted to effectuate. The majority was concerned that to overlook the principle of subsidiarity, and grant the application, would be to trench on the separation of powers.

== Minority judgment ==
Justice Edwin Cameron wrote for the minority, which disagreed that the applicant was obliged to challenge PAIA frontally and held that the applicant's approach to the Constitutional Court was competent. Cameron argued that Parliament's technical defence – resting on the principle of subsidiary – should not be allowed to trump the substance of My Vote Counts's complaint, writing that, "to shut down the route the applicant has chosen to enforce its right to information risks impoverishing the Constitution and this Court’s jurisdiction to interpret it".

Moreover, whereas the majority declined to evaluate the argument that information on party funding is essential to the exercise of the right to vote, the minority strongly affirmed that argument. The minority also agreed with My Vote Counts that PAIA was woefully inadequate to fulfil the concomitant right to access to information about party funding, and that Parliament had therefore failed to fulfil a constitutional obligation.

== Reactions ==
Some commentators viewed the court's decision as an evasion of the substance of the application or as a "lost opportunity to begin a respectful dialogue between the judiciary and the legislature about the shape and content of information security and disclosure laws". However, others pointed out that the minority opinion provided rhetorical support to a continued campaign by My Vote Counts for transparency in party funding, which ultimately culminated in My Vote Counts v Minister of Justice and Correctional Services.
