= Young v Minister of Safety & Security =

South African legal case

In Young and another v Minister of Safety and Security and others 2005 (2) SACR 437 (SE), sometimes called Young v Minister of Safety and Security, an important case in South African criminal procedure, Young ran a business supplying and distributing adult videos and DVDs, and sought order setting aside two search warrants, issued in terms of section 21 of the Criminal Procedure Act (CPA), and the seizure of certain articles.

Young contended that the search and seizure was unlawful, as it was conducted after sunset.

The court held that section 21(3)(a) of the CPA was intended to ensure that the privacy of people's homes was not invaded at unreasonable hours. This did not mean, however, that a search commenced during daytime became unlawful when the sun set; neither could it be said that the fact that the third respondent had left the premises to fetch certain equipment required for the copying of computer files, and had returned after night-fall, constituted a second and unauthorized search.

The application for the setting aside of the search warrants and the seizure of articles was therefore dismissed.

== Notes ==
- Young and another v Minister of Safety and Security and others 2005 (2) SACR 437 (SE)
