= S v Morrison =

South African legal case

In S v Morrison, an important case in South African criminal procedure, the court considered whether or not there is a duty on the presiding officer to inform the accused of his right to legal representation.

In terms of section 73(2) of the Criminal Procedure Act, 1977, the accused has a right to legal representation, but the court held that this right is generally known to most people, and that no rule of law or practice requires a trial court to spell this out to every unrepresented accused.

The court held that whether there is such a duty depends on the circumstances of the case.

This case was heard before the Constitution came into force. The Constitution now explicitly protects the right of the accused to be informed of his right to legal representation.

== Notes ==
- S v Morrison 1988 (4) SA 164 (T)
