= S v Dlamini =

S v Dlamini (1999), an important case in South African criminal procedure, dealt with a challenge to the constitutionality of certain provisions of section 60 of the Criminal Procedure Act, 1977.

What was in issue was the effect that section 60(14) may have on the right in section 35(1)(f) of the Constitution, to be released from detention if the interests of justice permit.

Notwithstanding the provisions of ss (14), a prosecutor may have to be ordered by the court (in terms of ss (11)) to lift the veil in order to afford the arrested person access to such docket.

Subsection (14) can therefore not be read as sanctioning a flat refusal on the part of the prosecution to divulge any information relating to the pending charge even where the information is necessary to give effect to the 'reasonable opportunity' requirement of ss (11).

Furthermore, there is a ready - and less absolute - interpretation of ss (14) which is both consistent with its language and in harmony with ss (11).

The words 'have access to' in ss (14) are to be interpreted as barring physical access to the contents of the docket, in the sense of having sight of or perusing such contents.

Thus ss (14), read restrictively as indicated, does no more than make plain that, whatever access to the police docket an accused may have to be afforded in order to protect the right to a fair trial guaranteed by the Constitution, there is no correspondingly general right at the bail stage.

In order to make that intention completely plain, the proviso to the subsection expressly excludes access required for trial purposes from its prohibitory ambit.

It follows, the court found, that there is no constitutional fault to be found with the subsection.
