= Minister of Health v New Clicks =

South African legal case

New Clicks South Africa (Pty) Ltd v Tshabalala-Msimang and Another NNO; Pharmaceutical Society of South Africa and Others v Tshabalala-Msimang and Another NNO 2005 (2) SA 530 (C) is an important case in South African administrative law. However, note that this case went on appeal, first to the Supreme Court of Appeal and thereafter to the Constitutional Court, where the various judgments of Chaskalson, Ngcobo, Sachs, Moseneke and others had far-reaching effects on administrative law in South Africa. This article discusses the first hearing of this matter in the Cape Provincial Division. The final judgment is listed on SAFLII as Minister of Health and Another v New Clicks South Africa (Pty) Ltd and Others (CCT 59/2004) [2005] ZACC 14.

== Facts ==
The applicants sought the review and setting aside of a recommendation made by the Pricing Committee, and of regulations made pursuant to the Medicines and Related Substances Act. The regulations dealt with a new pricing system for medicines in South Africa, as well as dispensing fees and wholesale pricing. The Pricing Committee had taken representations on behalf of interested parties. After this process, it made recommendations to the first respondent in the form of draft regulations. These were then published as final regulations.

== Judgment ==
The first question before the court was whether or not the conduct of the Pricing Committee constituted administrative action. Yekiso J, for the majority, began his analysis as follows:

For the conduct of the Pricing Committee to constitute an administrative action as against the applicants, there ought to exist an administrative law relationship based on authoritative power. This relationship encompasses an element of subordination on the object of such administrative law relationship which, in the instance of these proceedings, ought to be the applicants. Use of the authoritative power presupposes the administrative law relationship between the organ of state, as the subject of the administrative law relationship and the object, which could either be an individual or a group of individuals as the objects of such relationship.

Yekiso J then referred to section 33 of the Constitution and the definition section of the Promotion of Administrative Justice Act (PAJA) and continued as follows:

In terms of this definition conduct, in order to constitute administrative action as defined, has to have a direct, external legal effect and has to adversely affect rights of the individual or a group. On the face of it, it would appear that the definition of administrative action in section 1 of the Promotion of Administrative Justice Act limits the scope of administrative action in section 33 of the Constitution. Whether such limitation conforms to the requirements of the limitation clause in section 36 of the Constitution and thus passes muster, does not call for determination in these proceedings. From this definition, the following elements of the term administrative action emerge, namely:

* a decision

* that is of an administrative nature

* made in terms of the empowering provision

* that is not specifically excluded by the Act

* that adversely affects rights and

* that has a direct, external legal effect.

For the conduct of the Pricing Committee to be subject to review in terms of section 6 of the Promotion of Administrative Justice Act it has to embody all the elements enumerated in the preceding paragraph failing which the conduct complained of cannot be subject to review in terms of the Promotion of Just Administrative Act. If the conduct of the Pricing Committee does not fall within the ambit of the definition of administrative action contained in section 1 of the Promotion of Administrative Justice Act, the issue which will then call for determination is whether the conduct of the Pricing Committee is beyond judicial review. All these issues will be determined in the course of this judgment. To revert to the Pricing Committee, it will be recalled that it is a committee that was appointed and established in terms of section 22G(1) of the Act. Its mandate was to formulate recommendations which, if accepted, would enable the first respondent to make regulations relating to the introduction of a transparent pricing system for all medicines and Scheduled substances sold in the Republic and, on an appropriate dispensing fee to be charged by a pharmacist or by a person licensed in terms of section 22G(1)(a) of the Act. In line with its mandate the committee did formulate the required recommendations which it submitted to the first respondent for acceptance. It was for the first respondent to either accept or reject the recommendations as formulated. It is these recommendations which are the subject of a challenge by the applicants on the basis that the conduct of the Pricing Committee, in going about fulfilling its functions in the formulation of the recommendations, constitutes an administrative action within the meaning of the term as contemplated in section 1 of the Promotion of Just Administrative Act.

For the conduct of the Pricing Committee to constitute an administrative action within the meaning of that term in terms of the Promotion of Administrative Justice Act, not only should it fall within the ambit of that definition, but, at the very least, it will have to contain those elements I have set out in paragraph [35] of this judgment. The most important of these elements are, in my view, that the recommendations should adversely affect rights and should have a direct external legal effect. I venture to suggest at this stage that such conduct or action should affect the rights of the person concerned directly rather than indirectly. Once the recommendations were formulated and submitted to the first respondent for acceptance, at that stage, that is prior to acceptance thereof by the first respondent, they did not affect any one of the applicants' existing rights or legitimate expectations directly. Such recommendations did not have any force or effect on any one of the applicants. These were mere recommendations. They were not binding on the applicants and thus could not be construed as having had any direct, external legal effect. The applicants did not feel any effect of the recommendations.

The recommendations, prior to the acceptance thereof by the first respondent, did not impose any burden on the applicants nor did they, at that stage, remove rights from any one of the applicants. Even if one were to accept that the Pricing Committee is an organ of state, in my view, it can hardly be conceivable that the formulation of the recommendations which can only have a final effect once promulgated into regulation could be said to constitute exercise of public power. The direct, legal effect contemplated in the definition of administrative action cannot be conditional, in the sense of pending acceptance by the first respondent. In my view, and on the grounds set out in this and the preceding paragraph alone, the conduct and the activities of the Pricing Committee can hardly be construed as constituting an administrative action nor do such activities fall within the ambit of the definition of administrative action as defined in section 1 of the Promotion of Administrative Justice Act. Furthermore, for the activities of the Pricing Committee to constitute administrative action, such conduct, in terms of the definition of administrative action, should have, in as far as the applicants are concerned, a "direct legal effect." For any action to have a direct effect, it obviously must affect the person concerned directly rather than indirectly. Some writers, in particular, de Ville are of the view that direct effect requires finality in the administration of rights, which would exclude preliminary steps in multi-staged decisions. This would include the making of reports prior to decisions and any conduct preparatory to the taking of a decision. As regards the term legal effect, what this in my view would entail to is that the administrative action or decision must be a legally binding determination of individual rights. In other words, the recommendations, to constitute an administrative action, must either establish, change or withdraw existing rights. The recommendations of the Committee do not have any of these attributes. The principles of administrative justice apply to administrative action only and the Committee's recommendations fall short of this.

To the extent that the applicants seek to have the recommendations to be reviewed and set aside in terms of the provisions of the Promotion of Administrative Justice Act, the applicants' challenge on this ground cannot succeed for the simple reason that the conduct of the Committee, culminating in the recommendations, does not constitute an administrative action within the meaning of the Promotion of Administrative Justice Act.

Having found, however, that the recommendation could not be reviewed in terms of PAJA, Yekiso J held that the recommendation was nevertheless reviewable in terms of the common law and section 33 of the Constitution. He then turned to consider whether the passing of the regulations themselves fell under the definition section of the PAJA:

The making of regulations, which clearly is a legislative administrative action, as against judicial and pure administrative action, is not specifically referred to in the definition of the term "decision" in section 1 of the Promotion of Administrative Justice Act. Could it therefore be said that "rule making" was deliberately left out of the definition of the term "decision" and if so, whether it was the intention of the legislature not to include "rule making" in the definition of administrative action? The making of regulations, the subsequent promulgation and the enforcement of such regulations govern the general administrative law relationship as against the individual administrative law relationship. The former is what would constitute "administrative action affecting the public" as contemplated in section 4 of the Promotion of Administrative Justice Act. This obviously would entail the making and promulgation of such regulation by following the procedure as provided for in section 4(1) of the Promotion of Administrative Justice Act. Following the procedure as laid down in section 4(1) of the Promotion of Administrative Justice Act would obviously be preceded by a decision to follow that procedure. A decision to follow that procedure would constitute a decision taken in terms of section 4(1) of the Promotion of Administrative Justice Act. Now, the taking of a decision or failure to take a decision in terms of section 4(1) has been specifically excluded from the definition of the administrative action.

Could it be that the omission to refer to legislative administrative action in the definition of the term "decision" in section 1, and the specific exclusion of taking a decision or failure to take a decision in terms of section 4(1), is a pointer or an indication of an intention to exclude "rule making" from the ambit of administrative action? In my view the legislature could not have intended otherwise. In short, my view is that it was not the intention of the legislature to include rule making in the definition of and in the ambit of administrative action as defined in section 1 of the Promotion of Administrative Justice Act. To the extent that rule making could be construed as the implementation of national legislation as contemplated in section 85(2)(a) of the Constitution, the latter section of the Constitution provides "in implementing national legislation except where the Constitution or an Act of Parliament provides otherwise". In the instance of this matter the Promotion of Administrative Justice Act, which is an Act of Parliament, provides otherwise.

Once again, I must re-iterate, the fact that rule making does not constitute administrative action, does not render the regulations themselves to be beyond judicial scrutiny. The regulations are subject to review on the basis of the principle of legality, the principles of common law to the extent such common law principles are not inconsistent with the Constitution, the provisions of section 33(1) of the Constitution and other relevant provisions of the Constitution. I am making these observations mindful of what was said by the Constitutional Court in Pharmaceutical Manufacturers of SA and Another: In Re Ex Parte President of the Republic of South Africa and Others that the control of public power is always a constitutional matter.

Yekiso J considered this question later in the judgment and said as follows:

I have already determined in paragraph [49] of this judgment that the Regulations do not constitute an administrative act within the meaning of the term as defined in section 1 of the Promotion of Administrative Justice Act. I made this determination well aware of the remarks by O'Regan J in Bato Star Fishing (Pty) Ltd v The Minister of Environmental Affairs and Tourism and Others where the learned Justice said:

"The grundnorm of administrative law is now to be found in the first place not in the doctrine of ultra vires, nor in the doctrine of parliamentary sovereignty nor in the common law itself, but in the principles of our Constitution. The common law informs the principles of Paja and the Constitution and derives its force from the latter. The extent to which the common law remains relevant to administrative review will have to be developed on a case by case basis as the courts interpret and apply the provisions of PAJA and the Constitution."

I made this determination also well aware of the remarks by the Constitutional Court in Minister of Home Affairs v Eisenberg [2003 (8) BCLR 838 (CC) at paras 52 and 53] that, in that matter, it was not necessary to consider causes of action for judicial review of administrative action that do not fall within the scope of the Promotion of Administrative Justice Act. The Regulations which are the subject of this review, as I have already determined, do not fall within the scope of the Promotion of Administrative Justice Act. I re-iterate that the Regulations in question are susceptible to review on the basis of the principle of legality and other provisions of the Constitution in particular, the administrative justice clause.

In a minority judgment, Traverso DJP also considered whether the recommendations and the regulations constituted administrative action. Unlike Yekiso J, Traverso DJP found that the recommendation did constitute administrative action within the definition section of the PAJA. She reasoned as follows:

One of the issues raised is whether the making of recommendations by the Pricing Committee is reviewable under PAJA. [Counsel for the first respondent] submitted that the recommendation of the pricing committee is not reviewable because it is neither an "administrative action" nor a "decision" as defined in PAJA. He argued that the "recommendation" of the Pricing Committee is purely advisory in nature, and therefore does not fall within the definition of a decision as contained in Section 1(v) of PAJA. I agree with [counsel for the first respondent] that the recommendation of the Pricing Committee is not covered by those "decisions" listed in Section 1(v)(a)-(f) of PAJA. Section 1(v)(g) is more problematical. Its wording is much wider and it is a typical "catch all" provision. [Counsel for the first respondent] however argued that the words "any other act ... of an administrative nature" should be interpreted restrictively and with reference to the kinds of decisions listed in paragraphs 1(v)(a)-(f). For this submission he relied on the ejusdem generis principle, as there is a distinct genus of decisions listed under this definition. I cannot agree. Firstly the wording of this sub-section makes it plain that the actions listed in Section 1(v)(a)-(g) are not exhaustive. This was conceded by [counsel for the first respondent]. Secondly, there is nothing in the wording of Section 1(v)(g) which indicates that the words "any other act or thing of an administrative nature" refers to only acts or things belonging to a certain "genus". PAJA was specifically enacted to give effect to the constitutional right of citizens to just administrative action. This relates to all forms of administrative action and not just a restrictive "genus" of acts of an administrative nature. (See Pharmaceutical Manufacturers Association of SA: Ex parte President of the Republic of South Africa, 2000(2) SA 674 CC; JR de Ville: Judicial Review of Administrative Action in South Africa at p. 39.)

The Pricing Committee was appointed to make recommendations. As I will show later it is not in dispute that these recommendations are a jurisdictional prerequisite for the making of recommendations. It is in my view clear that the recommendations could adversely affect not only the rights of members of the pharmaceutical industry but also the rights of consumers, and therefore the public at large. When the Committee considered the public comment in formulating their recommendations they were clearly performing a function which was of an administrative nature. I am therefore satisfied that the word "decision" does not have the narrow meaning contended for by the Respondents.

The next point to consider is whether the recommendations of the Pricing Committee would have a "direct external legal effect". From the wording of Section 22G(2), it is clear that the making of a recommendation by the Committee is a specific and separate requirement for the making of the regulations, because it is only upon the recommendation of the Pricing Committee that the Minister can make the Regulations. That being so, and for the reasons set out in the preceding paragraph, it follows that the recommendations must ultimately have a direct external legal effect. These recommendations are not mere preliminary determinations, investigative actions or intermediate steps, which the legislature intended to exclude from the definition of administrative action. (See Currie & Klaaren: Promotion of Administrative Justice Act Benchbook at 44-45) On the contrary the recommendations are upon promulgation transformed into the regulations [....] I am [...] satisfied that a valid recommendation by the Pricing Committee is a jurisdictional requirement for valid regulations. Valid recommendations entail at least 3 elements:

(a) A recommendation made by the Pricing Committee, and not by any other person or entity;

(b) A fair procedure must be adopted and sustained by the Pricing Committee in its meetings;

(c) A proper application of the mind by a duly constituted Pricing Committee to all representations made to it.

These are in my view all matters which fall squarely within the definition contained in Section 1(v)(g) namely "any other act of an administrative nature".

Traverso DJP then turned to the question of whether or not the passing of the regulations also constituted administrative action within the definition as provided by the AJA. She wrote, (para 44—58)

PAJA excludes the executive powers and functions of the National Executive under Section 85(2)(b)-(e) of the Constitution from the definition of administrative action. It is however important to note that the powers and functions of the National Executive under Section 85(2)(a) of the Constitution are not excluded. They are:

"85(2) The President exercises the executive authority, together with other members of the Cabinet by—

(a) implementing national legislation ..."

The implementation of national legislation therefore falls under the definition of administrative action. In my view this provides a strong indication that the making of Regulations falls within the definition of administrative action as contained in PAJA. Section 33(1) of the Constitution provides that everyone has the right to administrative action that is lawful, reasonable and procedurally fair. Section 33(3) provides that national legislation must be enacted to give effect to those rights. If the definition of administrative action in PAJA has to be given the narrow meaning contended for on behalf of the First Respondent, it would in my view follow that PAJA will not pass constitutional muster as it will then not give effect to Section 33(1) of the Constitution. It would rather than give effect to the Bill of Rights, and in particular to Section 33 thereof, limit an individual's right to lawful, reasonable and procedurally fair administrative action. Such an interpretation must be avoided in favour of one which conforms to the Constitution. See National Director of Public Prosecutions v. Mohamed N.O, 2002 (4) SA 843 CC at 856 A-C. I therefore conclude that both the recommendations and the Regulations are subject to judicial review. The grounds of judicial review have now been codified by Section 6 of PAJA, and therefore if PAJA applies to the Regulations the review grounds must be located within Section 6 of PAJA (Bato Star Fishing (Pty) Ltd v Minister of Environmental Affairs and Tourism 2004 (7) BCLR 687 CC at 705 B-D). But as I have stated before, even if I am wrong in my conclusion that PAJA applies to the rule-making, then the Regulations may be challenged on the basis of the conventional grounds under the Constitution referred to above.

== See also ==
- South African administrative law
