= S v Zuma =

South African legal case

- Court: Constitutional Court of South Africa
- Full case name: State v Zuma and Others
- Decided: 5 April 1995
- Citations: [1995] ZACC 1, 1995 (2) SA 642 (CC), 1995 (4) BCLR 401 (CC)

Case history
- Prior action: Referral from Natal Provincial Division

Court membership
- Judges sitting: Chaskalson P, Ackermann, Didcott, Kriegler, Langa, Madala, Mahomed, Mokgoro, O'Regan & Sachs JJ, Kentridge AJ

Case opinions
- Decision by: Kentridge

S v Zuma and Others was the first case decided by the Constitutional Court of South Africa after it was established in 1995. The case dealt with a provision of the Criminal Procedure Act which required the defence in criminal cases to prove that a confession made before a magistrate was coerced, rather than requiring the state to prove that it was not coerced. The court held that this reverse onus provision was unconstitutional because it violated the right to a fair trial under section 25 of the Interim Constitution.
