= South African administrative law =

Law over public authorities

South African administrative law is the branch of public law which regulates the legal relations of public authorities, whether with private individuals and organisations or with other public authorities, or better say, in present-day South Africa, which regulates "the activities of bodies that exercise public powers or perform public functions, irrespective of whether those bodies are public authorities in a strict sense." According to the Constitutional Court, administrative law is "an incident of the separation of powers under which the courts regulate and control the exercise of public power by the other branches of government."

Weichers defines administrative law as a body of legal rules governing the administration, organisation, powers and functions of administrative authorities. For Baxter, it is a set of common-law principles which promote the effective use of administrative power, protect against misuse, preserve a balance of fairness and maintain the public interest. Chaskalson describes it as the interface between the bureaucratic state and its subjects.

From this it may be seen that commentators agree that administrative law is concerned with attaining administrative efficiency, and with ensuring that this power is tightly controlled, so that no abuse may occur. In Pharmaceutical Manufacturers Association of South Africa: In re Ex Parte President of the Republic of South Africa, it was held that administrative law forms the core of public law. It overlaps with constitutional law because both deal with organs of state and their relationship to individuals. Administrative law differs from constitutional law, however, in its emphasis on a particular branch of government (the public administration) and on a particular activity of the state (administrative action). In President of the RSA v SARFU, the Constitutional Court held that the administration is that part of government which is primarily concerned with the implementation of legislation.

In summary, then, administrative law regulates the activities of bodies that exercise public powers or perform public functions, and even certain private functions exercised by private bodies, but which functions have a public impact (see, for example, Lauren Kohn’s public/private typology, which is useful in ascertaining when the requirements of administrative justice will likely be found by a court to apply to particular conduct, irrespective of the seemingly private nature of the functions and actors).

In short though fundamentally, administrative law both empowers - in the main- administrative officials so that they may implement policies or programs, but it also limits the exercise of their powers by requiring that administrative action meet the minimum requirements of lawfulness, reasonableness and fairness; as well as written reason-giving when applicable.

For contemporary, scholarly insights on South African administrative law, see the legal scholarship of Advocate and Legal Scholar, Lauren Kohn; and, in particular, for an overview of this fast-evolving field of law, see Kohn and Corder’s Chapter 7 (“Administrative Justice in South Africa: An Overview of Our Curious Hybrid”) in the KAS Publication, “Pursuing Good Governance- Administrative Justice in Common-Law Africa”

== Sources ==
Administrative officials derive their authority or jurisdiction from a legal instrument or rule, and may only do what a law authorises them to so. This is known as the principle of legality, which requires that administrative authorities not only refrain from breaking the law, but that all their content comply with the Constitution and particularly the Bill of Rights. The sources of administrative law are, in order of importance,

- the Constitution;
- legislation; and
- the common law.

=== Constitution ===
The Constitution is the supreme law of the land. Any law or act which is inconsistent with it has no force or effect. The effect of this provision is that laws and administrative acts must comply with the Constitution. The Constitution is binding on the executive branch of government in every sphere of administration. The importance of the Constitution as a source of administrative law was best articulated in Pharmaceutical Manufacturers, where Chaskalson P held that the control of public power by the courts through judicial review is a constitutional matter. The common-law principles that had been applied to control powers prior to 1994 have now been subsumed under the Constitution. As a source of administrative law, the Constitution establishes a variety of agencies and administrative structures to control the exercise of public power.

In Bato Star Fishing v Minister of Environmental Affairs, O'Regan J held that there are not two systems of law regulating administrative action—the common law and the Constitution—but only one system grounded in the Constitution. The courts' power to review administrative action no longer flows directly from the common law, but rather from the constitutionally mandated PAJA and from the Constitution itself. The grundnorm of administrative law is now to be found in the first place not in the doctrine of ultra vires, nor in that of parliamentary sovereignty, nor in the common law itself, but rather in the principles of the Constitution. The common law informs the provisions of PAJA and the Constitution, and derives its force from the latter. The extent to which the common law remains relevant to administrative review will have to be developed on a case-by-case basis as the courts interpret and apply the provisions of PAJA and the Constitution.

=== Legislation ===
Legislation includes

- Acts of Parliament;
- provincial legislation;
- by-laws; and
- regulations, etc.

All these statutes may confer authority to take action and make decisions. For a statute to be valid, it must conform to constitutional requirements.

==== Provincial legislation ====
Section 125(2)(b) of the Constitution states that the Premier of a province exercises its executive authority, together with the other members of the Executive Council, by implementing all national legislation within the functional areas listed in Schedules 4 or 5 of the Constitution, except where the Constitution or an Act of Parliament provides otherwise.

==== Local-government legislation ====
Section 151 of the Constitution states that the executive and legislative authority of a municipality is vested in its municipal council. The municipality has the right to govern, on its own initiative, the local government affairs of its community, subject to national and provincial legislation, as provided for in the Constitution.

In Fedsure Life Assurance v Greater Johannesburg Transitional Metropolitan Council, the court found that the imposition of the rates and levies and the payment of the subsidies did not constitute "administrative action" under section 24 of the Interim Constitution. By-laws cannot fall within the definition of administrative action in PAJA; therefore they are not subject to the principles of just administrative action.

==== Subordinate legislation ====
Subordinate legislative bodies, such as the President, when promulgating proclamations, and ministers, when issuing regulations, do not have original legislative competence and must act within the confines of the enabling legislation. In Minister of Health v New Clicks, Chaskalson stated that the making of delegated legislation by a member off the executive is an essential part of public administration, in that it gives effect to legislative policies. Further, it provides the detailed infrastructure whereby this can take place.

==== PAJA ====
In Sasol Oil v Metcalfe, Willis held that "PAJA cannot be regarded as ordinary legislation," because it seeks to give effect to fundamental rights contained in the Bill of Rights. Willis described the Act further as "triumphal legislation."

=== Common law ===
Common law as a source of authority was mainly limited to the prerogative powers. A prerogative is a discretionary power given to someone by virtue of the fact that he holds a particular office. In President of RSA v Hugo, it was held that the common-law prerogative powers no longer exist in South African law as an independent source of power.

The reason for this is that the executive may not have inherent common-law powers which go beyond the ambit of the Constitution. The common law continues to influence administrative law until such a time as it is set aside on grounds of constitutional inconsistency.

Some of the administrative-law principles which have their origin in the common law are now written down in the Constitution or in legislation. The common-law principle of reasonableness, for example, is contained in the Constitution and PAJA.

In Marais v Democratic Alliance, the court found that common laws of procedural fairness and natural justice were applicable to a dispute between a mayor and a political party, even though the dispute itself did not fall under the scope of PAJA. In contrast, however, it was also held that PAJA must first be looked to as the source of law to resolve a dispute. In Pharmaceutical Manufacturers, the court held that the principles that have previously provided the grounds for judicial review of public power have been subsumed under the Constitution; in so far as they might continue to be relevant to judicial review, they gain their force from the Constitution.

=== International and foreign law ===
The Constitution obliges the courts to consider international human rights. Administrators must recognise international documents which deal with international human rights whenever they are relevant to the administrator's functions, and must act in accordance with these international documents. The courts are not confined to instruments that are binding on South Africa. In S v Makwanyane, the Constitutional Court held that both binding and non-binding international law may be used as a tool of interpretation.

Under foreign law, section 39(1) of the Constitution provides that a court may consider foreign law. Courts are not compelled to consider foreign law.

== History ==
=== Pre-1994 ===
Prior to 1994, South African administrative law was underdeveloped. The reason for this was that Parliament's surrender of more and more power to the executive. The law was not used to check or to structure these powers. Under this system, the courts could not question the validity of Acts of Parliament. In R v Mchlery, Lord De Villiers held that the courts had no right to enquire into or as to whether the legislature had acted wisely or unwisely for the benefit of the public or individuals.

The procedure for the review of administrative action under rule 53 of Uniform Rules of Court lacked clearly defined guidelines for how administrative action could be assessed. The principle of parliamentary sovereignty implied ministerial responsibility for administrative action. Ministerial responsibility was complementary to judicial review, in that

- judicial review is concerned with the legality of administrative action; and
- ministerial responsibility is concerned with merits of administrative action.

The efficiency of ministerial responsibility was reduced by the imbalance of party representation in the South African Parliament.

South African administrative law is similar to its English equivalent, especially in relation to judicial review of administrative action. For this reason, British cases are often cited and relied upon by South African courts. There are fundamental differences in substance, however. The conditions, composition and politics of South African society were and are different. Under apartheid, Parliament had the power to enact whatever it wished (however unreasonable and however unacceptable). The Parliament was not elected by universal franchise. The largest section of the population was excluded from representation on grounds of race. Laws affecting black people conferred extensive powers upon the administration. South Africa was isolated from the rest of the world, so its public law became insular.

In Lunt v University of Cape Town, regarding a refusal to allow a post-graduate into medical school, the court applied the legitimate-expectation doctrine in a contractual setting.

=== Reform ===
As early as the late 1980s, there were a number of reform initiatives aimed at reforming the undesirable state of administrative law in South Africa. Most of the reforms were court-driven and therefore known as judge-made reforms. There were limitations, however, which were embedded in the judicial process. Judges have no control over cases which come before them, so it was difficult to effect a programmatic reform.

A significant step was the decision in Attorney General, Eastern Cape v Bloom. The President had enacted a set of regulations which, for example, excluded a detainee from having a fair trial. This implied that the President could exclude natural justice. The court held that this was a dire mistake, and that the President could not exclude procedural fairness. This decision clarifies the underlying principle which was incorrectly interpreted in the case of Omar v Minister of Law and Order]], in which it was held that the State President, when enacting emergency regulations in terms of the Public Safety Act, could excuse the right to a hearing as well as the right of detainees to legal representatives.

Another reform was the recognition of the doctrine of legitimate expectation – this came as a result of landmark case of Transvaal v Traub, which extended the applicability of the right to be heard to cases which did not necessarily affect one's liberty, property or existing rights.

The courts also recognised unreasonableness as a ground of judicial review, which was expressed in Jacobs v Waks and reaffirmed in JSE v Witwatersrand Nigel Limited, where it was held that it is the function of the court to determine what was and what was not relevant to the exercise of discretionary administrative power.

There were also sporadic initiatives taken by the government, but these were limited, because there was no incentive for those in power to change administrative law in any meaningful way. The South African Law Review, however, published reports in 1986 and 1992 which included draft legislation to codify judicial review.

In SA Roads Board v Johannesburg City Council, the rigid classification of functions as either administrative or legislative was rejected; instead a distinction must be drawn between

- statutory powers which equally affect the members of a community at large;
- those powers which have a general impact and are calculated to cause particular prejudice to an individual or a particular group of individuals.

These reforms cleared the way for a new phase of administrative law reform, rooted on the principles of democratic rule and constitutional supremacy.

=== Post-1994 ===
Before 1994, South Africa had embraced the doctrine of parliamentary sovereignty. Now, however, the Constitution dictates that all exercises of public power be rational, justifiable and reasonable. The Interim Constitution provided a bridge from an authoritarian past to a democratic future. Section 24 of the Interim Constitution provided that every person shall have the right to

- lawful administrative action where any of his or her rights or interests is affected or threatened;
- procedurally fair administrative action where any of his or her rights or legitimate expectations is affected or threatened;
- be furnished with reasons in writing for administrative action which affects any of his or her rights or interests, unless the reasons for such aon have been made public; and
- administrative action which is justifiable in relation to the reasons given for it, where any of his or her rights is affected or threatened.

Section 33 of the final Constitution provides

- that everyone has the right to administrative action that is lawful, reasonable and procedurally fair;
- that everyone whose rights have been adversely affected by administrative action has the right to be given written reasons; and
- that national legislation must be enacted to give effect to these rights, and must
  - provide for the review of administrative action by a court or, where appropriate, an independent and impartial tribunal;
  - impose a duty on the state to give effect to the rights above; and
  - promote an efficient administration.

== Lawfulness ==
Administrators must obey the law and must be authorised by the law for the decisions they make. This is the same as the principle of legality; it is the authority of an administrator to act. The administrator must obey the law, whether general or specific, and must act within his delegated powers.

Affordable Medicines Trust v Minister of Health concerned a challenge to the validity of a licensing scheme introduced by the government. The applicants sought an order declaring the invalidity of certain sections of the Medicines and Related Substances Act which authorised the Director-General of Health to issue licences to dispense medicines to health practitioners, which could result in wide, unlimited and uncircumscribed arbitrary legislative powers. It was submitted that this was a breach of the principle of legality. The challenge raised the question of whether it is permissible for parliament to leave it to the Director-General to prescribe the conditions on which a licence may be issued.

It was held that there is nothing preventing Parliament from delegating subordinate regulatory authority to other bodies; nor is there anything that prevents Parliament from conferring upon the Director-General the discretion to determine the conditions. The delegation must not be so broad or vague, however, that the authority to whom the power is delegated is unable to determine the nature and the scope of the powers conferred, as this would lead to arbitrary exercise of delegated powers.

On the principle of legality, the court held that constitutional democracy is founded on the values of the supremacy of the Constitution and the rule of law; any law or conduct inconsistent with it is invalid. The exercise of public power must therefore comply with the Constitution, which is the supreme law, and with the doctrine of legality, which is part of that law. The Constitution entrenches the principle of legality and provides the foundation for the control of public power.

In exercising the power to make regulations, the Minister has to comply with the Constitution and the empowering provision. If he exceeds the powers conferred by the empowering provisions, there is a breach of the doctrine of legality.

In Nala Local Municipality v Lejweleputswa District Municipality, the legality of a meeting at which a decision to investigate alleged irregularities of the applicants was called into question. It was held that, in line with the principle of legality embodied in the Constitution and built into PAJA, administrative action not authorised by an empowering provision is unlawful and invalid, and that a person prejudiced by it may have it reviewed and set aside. It was held that the meeting did not comply with the requirements of the standard rules and orders, and therefore that it was irregularly convened and was therefore invalid.

In Platinum Asset Management v Financial Services Board, the argument was raised by Platinum Asset Management that an authorisation of an inspection of the applicant's business by the registrar in terms of the Inspection of Financial Institutions Act was "overboard, undefined and unspecified," and therefore in contravention of the principle of the rule of law and the doctrine of legality. The applicants relied on case law to the effect that the absence of clear parameters in the letter of appointment renders the appointment overboard and inconsistent with the rule of law entrenched in section 1 of the Constitution. Because of the circumstances of the case, however, it was held that the applicants had no basis for reliance on section 1.

In Mgoqi v City of Cape Town, Mgoqi acted as the municipal manager of the City of Cape Town in terms of contract of employment between him and the city council. The former mayor of the city altered the contract and extended the period for which it ran. When a new mayor was elected, there was a meeting at which the extended contract was reviewed and revoked. The first application concerned the inconsistency of this with the Constitution and therefore its unlawfulness and invalidity. The second application, brought by the city of Cape Town, was for the review and setting aside of the first Mayor's decision to extend the contract of employment.

In terms of the second application, the court dealt with the matter on the basis of the doctrine of legality. It was held that the first Mayor did not have the power to make his decision. This was argued on three grounds by the City:

1. The statutory framework does not allow the delegation of power to extend the municipal manager's contract to the mayor, and the former mayor's unilateral exercise of power could never have been lawful.
2. The city's own system of delegation, like the statutory framework, does not allow the delegation of power to appoint a municipal manager.
3. Even if the municipal system of delegation did allow the delegation of the power to the mayor, it was not properly done, as there was a requirement for the council to be in recess at the time that the former mayor purportedly exercised her recess powers. Furthermore, there was no consultation. In terms of empowering provisions, therefore, the former mayor failed to act in terms of the requirements laid out in the relevant sections.

The court held on all three grounds that the former mayor's decision to extend the contract of employment was fatally flawed, unlawful and invalid.

In Van Zyl v Government of RSA, the applicants sought the review and the setting aside of a decision by the government (the decision not to engage in diplomatic relations with the government of Lesotho), in order to protect the applicant's property rights and interests in Lesotho.

An example of delegation may be found in section 7 of the Refugees Act, in terms of which the Minister of Home Affairs may delegate any power granted to or duty imposed on him by the Act to an officer in the Department of Home Affairs. To be lawful, a delegation of a power or a duty by the Minister has three requirements:

1. The Minister (no one else) must take the decision to delegate a power or duty.
2. The person to whom the power or duty is delegated must be an officer in the Department of Home Affairs.
3. The power or duty delegated must be one provided for and conferred on the Minister in the Refugees Act. If any of these requirements are not met, the delegation will be unlawful. In addition, any action taken by the officer concerned who is not properly authorised is unlawful.

== Reasonableness ==
The Interim Constitution, in section 24, provides that every person has the right to administrative action which is justifiable. The Constitution, in section 33, states that everyone has the right to administrative action which is lawful, reasonable and procedurally fair.

The content of reasonableness remains unclear, but it was held in the case of Bato Star Fishing that what will constitute a reasonable decision will depend on the circumstances of each case. Factors include

- the nature of the decision;
- the identity and expertise of the decision-maker;
- the range of factors relevant to the decision;
- the reasons given for the decision;
- the nature of competing interests; and
- the impact of the decision.

It was held further, in the case of Rowan v Williams, that a decision must be capable of objective substantiation. In order to prove justifiability in relation to the reasons given for it, it must be objectively tested against the three requirements of suitability, necessity and proportionality. Gross unreasonableness is no longer a requirement for review. The constitutional test embodies the requirement for proportionality between the means and the end.

In short reasonableness requires that

- the information available to an administrator supports the decision made;
- the decision be supported by sound reasons;
- the decision makes logical sense in relation to the available information;
- the empowering provision and other relevant provisions be correctly understood and applied;
- the adverse effect of the decision be proportionate to the objective sought to be achieved; and
- there not be a less restrictive means to achieve the purpose of the decision.

== Procedural fairness ==
Section 33(1) of the Constitution provides for a right to administrative action that is procedurally fair. The question is this: How to determine the content of the right? There are three legal sources:

1. the provisions of PAJA;
2. the provisions of the common law; and
3. the interpretation provided by judicial decisions (under the Interim Constitution and the final Constitution).

The common law embodies certain principles of natural justice, including audi alteram partem (or "hear the other side") and nemo iudexin sua causa (or "no-one may be a judge in his own cause").

Requirements for the opportunity to be heard are as follows:

- that there be proper notice of the intended action;
- that there be reasonable and timely notice;
- that there be personal appearance;
- that there be legal representation;
- that there be evidence and/or cross-examination;
- that there be a public hearing; and
- that the other side be properly informed of the considerations which count against him.

Section 3(1) of PAJA provides that administrative action which materially and adversely affects the rights or legitimate expectations of any person must be procedurally fair.

Section 33 of the Constitution is of paramount importance. The operation of section 33 remained suspended until legislation was enacted in the form of PAJA, which rendered section 33 binding and enforceable. Section 33 brought about far-reaching changes to administrative law. Section 33 aims to cause administrative decision-making to be open, transparent and rational, to provide a safeguard against capriciousness and autocratic tendencies, and promote administrative accountability and justice.

== Interaction between common law, PAJA and the Constitution ==
In Minister of Environmental Affairs & Tourism v Phambili Fisheries, the respondent successfully challenged in the court a quo the decision of the Chief Director of Marine Coastal Management to allocate a maximum amount of hake that they were permitted to catch, being less than what they had asked for. The empowering provision was the Marine Living Resources Act. The respondents were both companies of historically disadvantaged persons. They argued that the Chief Director had failed to consider adequately the need for transformation when allocating less to them than they had requested.

In Bato Star Fishing, the applicant relied on three ground in its application for special leave to appeal:

1. that the Supreme Court of Appeal (SCA) had misconstrued the nature of the objectives in section 2 of the Act;
2. that the SCA incorrectly concluded that the Chief Director's decision should not be set aside on the ground that he failed to apply his mind to the quantum of hake applied for by the applicant and its ability to catch such quantum; and
3. that the SCA had erred in finding that the alleged "undisclosed policy change" by the Department did not infringe the applicant's right to procedural fairness.

The court held that there are not two systems of administrative law, one founded on the Constitution and one founded on the common law. There is now but one system of administrative law, founded in the Constitution and expressed in PAJA.

Section 1 of PAJA defines the scope of administrative action. It was held that the cause of action for the judicial review of administrative action now ordinarily arises from PAJA, not from the common law, as in the past, and that the authority of PAJA to ground such causes of action rests squarely on the Constitution.

In Petro Props v Barlow, the applicant was the owner of immovable property on which it intended to construct and operate a filling station. It had the backing of Sasol, with which certain agreements had been concluded. The respondents were opposed to the development, fearing that a filling station in the proposed location will be detrimental to the wetland surrounding it. In spite of this, the applicant was granted authorisation in terms of section 22 of the Environmental Conservation Act (ECA). A campaign was launched in opposition to this. The application was for an interdict to prohibit the respondents from continuing the campaign.

The respondents resisted the application for an interdict on the ground that it would violate the constitutional right to freedom of expression.

The applicants argued that sections 35 and 36 of the ECA operate as a limitation on the constitutional right to freedom of expression and that the limitation was justifiable in terms of section 36 of the Constitution. This argument was rejected. The court held that such limitation on the rights in the Bill of Rights was not justifiable in terms of section 36, as the factors must be considered on the criterion of proportionality.

The structure of the applicants' argument was based on section 7 of PAJA, which limits access to the right to have administrative action reviewed until internal appeal or review procedures have been exhausted. One difference between the right to administrative action and the other rights in the Bill of Rights is that PAJA explicitly places that limitation on access to the protection of section 33. The mere fact that alternative procedures exist does not create this limitation.

In the new constitutional order, the control of public power is always a constitutional matter. The court's power to review administrative action no longer flows directly from the common law but from PAJA and the Constitution itself. The common law informs the provisions of PAJA and the Constitution, and derives its force from the latter. The extent to which the common law remains relevant to administrative review will have to be developed on a case-by-case basis as the courts interpret and apply the provisions of PAJA and the Constitution.

== Promotion of Administrative Justice Act (PAJA) ==
=== Purpose and preamble ===
This law was passed to realise the vision of an open and accountable system of administrative law that is fair and just. It is designed to constrain government, and represents a decisive break from the past. The purpose of the Act is to give effect to the right to administrative action which is lawful, reasonable and procedurally fair, and the right to written reasons for administrative action. The preamble of the Act promotes efficient administration and good governance, and emphasises the importance of a culture of accountability, openness and transparency in public administration.

=== Definitions ===
==== "Administrative action" ====
"Administrative action" is defined in the Promotion of Administrative Justice Act (PAJA) as any decision taken, or any failure to take a decision, by

- an organ of state, when
  - exercising a power in terms of the Constitution or a provincial constitution; or
  - exercising a public power or performing a public function in terms of any legislation; or
- a natural or juristic person, other than an organ of state, when exercising a public power or performing a public function in terms of an empowering provision, which adversely affects the rights of any person, and which has a direct, external legal effect.

The Act resolves to control exercises of public power, even by private actors, with the requirements of lawfulness, procedural fairness and reasonableness. It is the nature of the functions performed, as opposed to the nature of the functionary, that is important. It has been argued that this definition has shortfalls, in that, for example, it excludes the nine categories of public functions.

==== "Decision" ====
A decision in this context includes a proposed decision and a failure to take a decision. An administrative decision must be taken without unreasonable delay, or within the time period that may be prescribed for the particular administrative action.

In PAJA, a "decision" is defined as any decision of an administrative nature made, proposed to be made, or required to be made, as the case may be, under an empowering provision, including a decision relating to

- making, suspending, revoking or refusing to make an order, award or determination;
- giving, suspending, revoking or refusing to give a certificate, direction, approval, consent or permission;
- issuing, suspending, revoking or refusing to issue a licence, authority or other instrument;
- imposing a condition or restriction;
- making a declaration, demand or requirement;
- retaining, or refusing to deliver up, an article; or
- doing or refusing to do any other act or thing of an administrative nature. A reference to a failure to take a decision must be construed accordingly.

A decision is the exercise of discretionary powers. It is a legislative function performed by an elected legislative body, not subordinate legislation.

In Noupoort Christian Care Centre v Minister of National Department of Social Development the applicant argued that the failure by the respondent to determine the question of whether the applicant was entitled to a permanent licence amounted to unlawful administrative action. It was held that inaction on the part of the respondent falls under the definition of administrative action in section 1 of PAJA. A decision includes any decision of an administrative nature made under an empowering provision, including the decision relating to issuing or refusing to issue a licence.

==== "Of an administrative nature" ====
Most decisions that administrators take as part of their official functions are of an administrative nature. There is necessarily a public character to the phrase. The relationship is one of inequality or subordination. It excludes decisions made in the exercise of legislative and judicial power. These are decisions connected with the daily or ordinary business of government. The effect of the phrase "of an administrative nature" is that only decisions made in the course of exercising and performing powers and functions will qualify as administrative action subject to PAJA.

In Gamevest v Regional Land Claims Commissioner, Northern Province and Mpumalanga, the appellant challenged a decision of the Regional Land Claims Commissioner to accept the claim of the fifth respondent for certain land in terms of the Restitution of Land Rights Act. The steps to be followed in terms of section 11 of the Act are as follows:

1. The applicant lodges the claim.
2. Once it is accepted, notice is given in the Government Gazette of this fact.
3. The Commissioner investigates the matter.
4. The matter is referred to the Land Claims Court.

When the matter reached the court, PAJA had not yet come into force, so it was necessary to rely on the common law. On the facts, the alleged decision was merely an opinion expressed by a representative of the Commissioner at the first stage of the process; it was therefore not an administrative decision that could be set aside.

In Platinum Asset Management v Financial Services Board; Anglo Rand Capital House v Financial Service Board, the applicants were companies believed to be carrying on operations buying and selling shares on behalf of paying clients on various international stock exchanges without the necessary approval in terms of section 445 of the Stock Exchange Control Act. On the basis of this belief, the CEO authorised inspections of the applicants, which subsequently took place.

The applicants sought the review and setting aside of the decision to authorise an inspection on the basis

- that the inspection was ultra vires the powers conferred in section 3(1), because the applicant companies were not "financial institutions" or "associated institutions" within the meaning of section 3(1);
- that the authorisation made was vague and overboard;
- that the investigation was initiated at the behest of a foreign regulating authority, and the purpose of the authorisation, in seeking to ensure compliance with the laws of that country, was ulterior
- that the inspectors responsible for carrying out the investigation were not independent; and
- that the investigation was ultra vires because the Financial Services Board (FSB) is empowered to investigate only contraventions of laws supervised by the FSB, namely laws relating to financial institutions.

There are, then, two sets of actions, regarding respectively

1. the decision of the CEO to authorise inspections; and
2. the inspections themselves.

It was held that, while the CEO's decision would not amount to administrative action within the meaning of section 1 of PAJA, whether the actions of the inspectors would was a separate inquiry. As to the meaning of administrative action, it was noted that rights need only be affected, rather than affected adversely, in order to meet the definitional standards of section 1 of PAJA. There is, furthermore, no distinction between administrative action as defined in PAJA and administrative action as defined in section 33 of the Constitution, so the procedural requirement cannot be avoided. If PAJA applies to a case, therefore, its provisions must be determinative of the merits of the case.

==== "Empowering provision" ====
The importance of this provision lies in the determination of lawfulness of the administrative action. An "empowering provision" is

- a law;
- a rule of common law;
- customary law; or
- an agreement, instrument or other document in terms of which an administrative action was purportedly taken.

The empowering provision is an extremely important aspect of any administrative action. Any action not authorised by the empowering provision is not allowed. In fact, section 6 of PAJA says that a court may set aside decisions where

- the decision was taken by an administrator who was not authorised to do so by the empowering provision;
- the decision was taken by someone who was delegated to take the decision, but the empowering provision did not allow such delegation;
- a "mandatory and material procedure or condition" set out in the empowering provision was not followed; or
- the action was taken for a reason that was not authorised by the empowering provision; or
- the action was not rationally connected to the purpose of the empowering provision.

An "enabling statute" is that legislation which allows the administration to act.

In the case of natural or juristic persons, a wider definition of "empowering provision" is employed to accommodate instances where natural or juristic persons exercise public power or perform public functions, such as the functions awarded to them in terms of outsourcing agreements.

The powers contained in the empowering provision may be express; they may also include tacit powers, in which case rules can be applied to establish the content and ambit of the administrator's authority in the particular circumstance.

Administrators operate under certain conditions and for the most part have very little freedom to choose how they would like to make decisions. They are controlled by empowering provisions, which govern decisions according to sets of rules. These rules may come in the form of conditions, expressed by such terms as "age," "fit and proper," "exceptional circumstances," "reasonable," etc. These are often hard to define, so some of these concepts need to be given meaning. This is done by setting a standard against which people or circumstances can be measured. Such standards need to be

- relevant;
- fair; and
- reasonable.

In some circumstances, there are guidelines about how an administrator should act. These can be found by looking at how such decisions have been made within their department, and how the courts have interpreted these words in the past. Sometimes the Preamble to the empowering Act may also say what the purpose of the Act is.

==== "Not specifically excluded by the Act" ====
The Act specifically excludes some decisions of administrators, such as decisions made in terms of the Promotion of Access to Information Act. Examples include

- the exercise of powers by the Executive in the national, provincial and local spheres of government
- the making of legislation;
- the judicial functions of the courts;
- the actions of traditional leaders and a special tribunal;
- a decision to prosecute;
- appointment of judicial officers;
- decisions under PAIA; and
- a decision in terms of section 4(1).

In section 33 the adjective "administrative," not "executive," is used to qualify "action." This suggests that the test for determining whether conduct constitutes "administrative action" is not whether or not the action concerned is performed by a member of the executive arm of government. What matters is not so much the functionary as the function. The question is whether the task itself is administrative or not. It may well be that some acts of a legislature may constitute "administrative action." Similarly, judicial officers may, from time to time, carry out administrative tasks. The focus of the enquiry as to whether conduct is "administrative action" is not on the arm of government to which the relevant actor belongs, but on the nature of the power he or she is exercising.

== See also ==
- Administrative law
- Law of South Africa
