= SANDU v Minister of Defence (2007) =

South African legal case

- Court: Constitutional Court of South Africa
- Full case name: South African National Defence Union v Minister of Defence and Others
- Decided: 30 May 2007
- Docket nos.: CCT 65/06
- Citations: [2007] ZACC 10; 2007 (5) SA 400 (CC); 2007 (8) BCLR 863 (CC); [2007] 9 BLLR 785 (CC); (2007) 28 ILJ 1909 (CC)

Case history
- Prior actions: In the Supreme Court of Appeal: Minister of Defence and Others v SANDU; Minister of Defence and Others v SANDU and Another [2006] ZASCA 92; SANDU v Minister of Defence and Others; Minister of Defence and Others v SANDU and Others [2006] ZASCA 95; In the High Court of South Africa, Transvaal Division: SANDU v Minister of Defence and Others 2003 (3) SA 239 (T) (SANDU I); SANDU and Another v Minister of Defence and Others 2004 (4) SA 10 (T); 2003 (9) BCLR 1055 (T) (SANDU II); SANDU and Others v Minister of Defence (T) (15790/2003) (SANDU III)

Court membership
- Judges sitting: Moseneke DCJ, Madala J, Mokgoro J, Ngcobo J, Nkabinde J, O'Regan J, Sachs J, Skweyiya J and Navsa AJ

Case opinions
- Decision by: O'Regan J (unanimous)

In South African National Defence Union v Minister of Defence and Others, an important case in South African labour law, the Constitutional Court gave judgment on a series of disputes connected to collective bargaining that had arisen between the South African National Defence Union (SANDU) and the South African National Defence Force (SANDF).

== Background ==
Since the 1999 judgment of the Constitution Court in SANDU v Minister of Defence, the legislative framework constructed for collective bargaining in South Africa had taken force.

=== High Court ===
The application originated in five separate matters initiated by SANDU against the Minister of Defence in the Pretoria High Court between 2001 and 2003, which resulted in three separate High Court judgments:

1. The first of these judgments (SANDU I), written by Judge Johann van der Westhuizen, held that the SANDF was not obliged to bargain collectively with SANDU, and that SANDF’s withdrawal from negotiations with SANDU was reasonable.
2. The second of these judgments (SANDU II), written by Judge J. M. C. Smit, also concerned the duty to bargain, as well as an attack on specific regulations passed pursuant to national legislation, relating to labour relations in the military. This judgment held that the regulations violated the union members’ rights to participate in union activities, as well as their rights to freedom of expression and association; it held that, contrary to the earlier judgment, the SANDF had a duty to bargain with SANDU.
3. In the third case (SANDU III), Judge Eberhardt Bertelsmann's court made an order preventing the SANDF from implementing a restructuring programme without first consulting with SANDU.

=== Supreme Court of Appeal ===
The decisions in these three cases were appealed to the Supreme Court of Appeal. A single, consolidated hearing was held, resulting in two unanimous judgments:

1. The first judgment, written by Judge Johan Conradie, held that the SANDF is not obliged by the provisions of the Constitution or any other law to bargain collectively with SANDU.
2. The second judgment, written by Judge Robert Nugent, dismissed all the challenges to the regulations, save one.

SANDU sought leave to appeal to the Constitutional Court against the large part of the judgments and orders made by the Supreme Court of Appeal.

== Judgment ==
Justice Kate O’Regan, writing for the Court, dealt with the history of the relationship between SANDU and the SANDF. She confirmed the principle of subsidiarity, holding that, where legislation has been enacted to give effect to a constitutional right, a litigant is not entitled to bypass that legislation and to rely directly on the constitutional right. If, in other words, a framework has been created to give effect to the Constitution, a litigant must use that framework, unless he means to claim that it falls short or is unconstitutional; otherwise the legislative intervention would serve no purpose. As regulations had been enacted to give effect to section 23 of the Constitution, and to regulate the bargaining relationship between SANDU and the SANDF, the application for leave to appeal must be determined in the light of those regulations. The court did not find it necessary, accordingly, to determine whether section 23(5) of the Constitution confers a justiciable duty to bargain collectively on employers and trade unions.

The judgment concluded that the regulations establish a bargaining forum, the Military Bargaining Council (the MBC), where matters of mutual interest to SANDU and the SANDF are to be negotiated. If disputes arise in respect of such matters, those disputes may be referred to arbitration by the Military Arbitration Board. The court held that, on a proper construction of the regulations, the SANDF may not impose pre-conditions for bargaining; nor may it withdraw unilaterally from the MBC. It also found that the regulations do not permit the SANDF to implement unilaterally a transformation policy which is the subject of a dispute at the MBC, and which has been referred to the Military Arbitration Board.

Finally, the court held that SANDU is not entitled in terms of the regulations to demand that the respondents bargain over the content of the regulations. Were s 23(5) to establish a justiciable duty to bargain, enforceable by either employers or unions outside of a legislative framework to regulate that duty, courts may be drawn into a range of controversial industrial relations issues. These issues would include questions such as at which level bargaining should take place, level of union membership required to give rise to the duty, topics and manner of bargaining. These are difficult issues which the courts are not the best equipped to deal with.

In considering the challenges to the individual regulations, the court dismissed SANDU’s challenge to the regulation that prohibits union members from participating in union activities while undergoing training or participating in military exercises. The SANDF can justifiably limit union activities in instances when such activities may interfere with the military’s ability to carry out its constitutional obligation to protect the country. In the same vein, the SANDF has a legitimate interest in preserving the appearance of the political neutrality of the military by prohibiting association with other trade unions.

The court held, however, that several of the regulations were unconstitutional. It found that the Minister of Defence, as head of SANDF, could not appoint the members of the Military Arbitration Board (the body tasked with settling union disputes) because appointment by an interested party (the Minister as the employer) undermines the impartiality and independence of the Board.

Furthermore, regulations which prohibited union members from being represented by union members or officials in grievance or disciplinary proceedings offended the right to fair labour practices, because representing its members is one of a union’s central tasks. Finally, to the extent that the good order and discipline of the military was not jeopardised, the SANDF could not forbid non-uniformed soldiers from assembling to petition or picket as private citizens.

== See also ==
- South African labour law

== Bibliography ==
- South African National Defence Union v Minister of Defence and Others (CCT65/06) [2007] ZACC 10; 2007 (5) SA 400; 2007 (8) BCLR 863 (CC); [2007] 9 BLLR 785 (CC); (2007) 28 ILJ 1909 (CC) (30 May 2007).
