= Pharmaceutical Manufacturers Association of South Africa: In re Ex Parte President of the Republic of South Africa =

South African legal case

Pharmaceutical Manufacturers Association of SA and Another: In re ex parte President of the Republic of South Africa and Others is an important case in South African constitutional law. It deals with relevant issues about the role of the courts in controlling public power, and raises the question of whether or not a court has the power to review and set aside a decision by the President of South Africa to bring an Act of Parliament into force.

The Constitutional Court held that the purpose of section 172(2)(a) was to ensure that the Constitutional Court, as the highest court in constitutional matters, controls declarations of constitutional invalidity made against the highest organs of state. This purpose would be defeated, the court found, if the issue in casu, concerning the legality of the President's conduct (a matter of considerable importance), were characterised as not falling within section 172(2)(a); that would be to remove it from the controlling power of the Constitutional Court. The section was, therefore, to be given a wide meaning as far as the President's conduct was concerned.

== Facts ==
The matter arose when the Transvaal High Court was requested to review and set aside the President’s decision to bring the South African Medicines and Medical Devices Regulatory Authority Act 1998 into operation on 30 April 1999. The purpose of the Act was to govern the registration and control of medicines for human and animal use, and to replace previous legislation dealing with these matters. The Act sought to control the flow of medicines on the market by classifying medicines into specific categories. In order to be effective, the Act required a comprehensive regulatory infrastructure, including the determination of schedules regulating the manufacture, sale and possession of substances controlled by the Act. The applicants (the President and others) alleged that, through an error made in good faith, the Act had been brought into operation before the necessary regulatory infrastructure had been put in place, and that, as a consequence, the entire regulatory structure had been rendered unworkable. The result would be highly damaging to the public in that control over dangerous medicines would be lost before the new schedules were in place.

== Judgment ==
The matter was referred to the Constitutional Court by the High Court for confirmation of its order declaring the decision of the President to bring the Act into force null and void. The Constitutional Court, in a unanimous decision delivered by Chaskalson P, confirmed the order of the Transvaal High Court, but gave reasons that were different from those of the High Court. Two issues had to be decided by the Court. The first was whether or not the High Court’s order, setting aside the President’s decision, was a finding of “constitutional invalidity” that required confirmation by the Constitutional Court under section 172(2) of the Constitution. If so, the second issue was whether the President’s decision to bring the Act into force was constitutionally valid or not.

=== Confirmation ===
Commenting on whether the High Court’s order was a finding of "constitutional invalidity," the Court emphasised that the control of public power by the courts through judicial review is, and always has been, a constitutional matter. This is so irrespective of whether the principles are set out in a written Constitution or contained in the common law.

Judicial review is an incident of the separation of powers, under which courts regulate and control the exercise of public power by the other branches of government. Before the interim Constitution came into force, in April 1994, the principles of judicial review were developed through the “crucible” of the common law. Since the adoption of the interim Constitution, public power is controlled by the written Constitution, which is the supreme law. The common-law precedent continues to inform the law only to the extent that it is consistent with the Constitution. Consequently, there is only one system of law. Thus, orders of invalidity under the courts’ powers of judicial review are orders of constitutional invalidity. If the order of invalidity relates to conduct of the President, section 172(2) of the Constitution requires that it be confirmed by the Constitutional Court.

In this regard, the court held that, as the Constitutional Court, it "occupies a special place in this new constitutional order." It had been established as part of that order, "as a new Court with no links to the past," to be the highest Court in respect of all constitutional matters, "and, as such, the guardian of our Constitution." It had exclusive jurisdiction in respect of certain constitutional matters, and made the final decision on those constitutional matters which also fell within the jurisdiction of other courts.

It was within this context that section 172(2)(a) had to be construed. That section was concerned with law-making acts of the legislatures at the two highest levels, and with the conduct of the President who, as head of State and of the Executive, was the highest functionary within the State. The use of the words "any conduct of the President" indicated that "the section is to be given a wide meaning as far as the conduct of the President is concerned." The section's "apparent purpose" was to ensure that the Constitutional Court, as the highest Court in constitutional matters, should control declarations of constitutional invalidity made against the highest organs of State. That purpose would be defeated if an issue concerning the legality of conduct of the President, which raised a constitutional issue of considerable importance, could be characterised as not falling within section 172(2)(a), and thereby removed from the controlling power of the Constitutional Court under that section.

The decision of the Full Bench of the High Court was accordingly subject to confirmation by the Constitutional Court under section 172(2)(a).

=== Review and setting aside ===
In deciding the second question, the court noted the reluctance of courts in other countries to review decisions of this nature because of the political nature of the judgment required, and its closeness to legislative powers.

The Court held that the power was not “administrative action,” as contemplated in the administrative justice clause in the Bill of Rights, and therefore did not fall within the controls of public power set out in that clause. Rather, it was a power of a special nature, the character of which is neither legislative nor administrative, although it is more closely linked to the legislative than the administrative function. However, the exercise of such a power is not beyond the reach of judicial review, because the exercise of all power must conform with the Constitution, and, in particular, the requirements of the rule of law—a foundational principle in the Constitution. The Court held that this includes the requirement that a decision, viewed objectively, must be rationally related to the purpose for which the power was given. Thus, even if the President acts in good faith, his decision may be invalid if it does not meet this objective requirement. This does not mean, however, that a court may interfere with a decision simply because it disagrees with it or considers that the power was exercised inappropriately.

On the facts, the court held that the decision to bring the Act into force on April 30, 1999, before the necessary schedules were in place, although through no fault of the President, was objectively irrational. It noted that no rational basis for the decision had been suggested, and that the President himself had approached the court urgently, with the support of the Minister of Health and the professional associations most directly affected by the Act.

=== Effect ===
The effect of the Constitutional Court’s decision in this case was that the 1965 legislation that governed the control of medicinal substances, and that was to be replaced by the 1998 Act, remained in force until such time as the President determined a date for bringing the new Act into force.

== See also ==
- South African constitutional law
