= S v Mhlungu =

South African legal case

- Court: Constitutional Court of South Africa
- Full case name: State v Mhlungu and Others
- Decided: 8 June 1995
- Citations: [1995] ZACC 4, 1995 (3) SA 867 (CC), 1995 (7) BCLR 793 (CC)

Case history
- Prior action: Referral from Natal Provincial Division

Court membership
- Judges sitting: Chaskalson P, Ackermann, Didcott, Kriegler, Langa, Madala, Mahomed, Mokgoro, O'Regan & Sachs JJ, Kentridge AJ

Case opinions
- Decision by: Mahomed

S v Mhlungu and Others is a decision of the Constitutional Court of South Africa in which the court interpreted a transitional provision in the Interim Constitution of South Africa relating to the handling of criminal cases that were pending when that constitution came into force on 27 April 1994. The ruling, handed down on 8 June 1995, held that such cases were subject to the human rights protections in Chapter 3 of the Interim Constitution despite a clause appearing to exclude them.
