= President v Hugo =

South African legal case

- Court: Constitutional Court of South Africa
- Full case name: President of the Republic of South Africa and Another v Hugo
- Decided: 18 April 1997
- Docket nos.: CCT 11/96
- Citations: [1997] ZACC 4; 1997 (6) BCLR 708; 1997 (4) SA 1

Case history
- Prior actions: Supreme Court of South Africa, Durban and Coast Local Division – Hugo v President of the Republic of South Africa and Another 1996 (4) SA 1012 (D)

Court membership
- Judges sitting: Chaskalson P, Mahomed DP, Ackermann, Didcott, Goldstone, Kriegler, Langa, Madala, Mokgoro, O'Regan and Sachs JJ

Case opinions
- The provisions of the Presidential Act No. 17 of 27 June, 1994, relating to the remission of sentences of mothers in prison, are not inconsistent with the Interim Constitution.
- Decision by: Goldstone J (Chaskalson, Mahomed, Ackermann, Langa, Madala and Sachs concurring)
- Concurrence: O'Regan J (Chaskalson, Mahomed, Ackermann, Goldstone, Langa, Madala and Sachs concurring)
- Concur/dissent: Mokgoro J
- Dissent: Didcott J
- Dissent: Kriegler J

President of the Republic of South Africa and Another v Hugo is a 1997 decision of the Constitutional Court of South Africa. The court affirmed that the exercise of presidential prerogative powers is subject to judicial review, but it nonetheless found that President Nelson Mandela had acted fairly and lawfully in pardoning imprisoned mothers, but not imprisoned fathers, in a June 1994 presidential decree. The decision was among the first in the Constitutional Court's emerging jurisprudence on unfair discrimination and the right to equality.

== Background ==
Section 82(1)(k) of the Interim Constitution of South Africa empowered the President of South Africa to pardon or reprieve criminal offences and to remit criminal penalties. Acting in terms of this power, on 27 June 1994, newly elected President Nelson Mandela signed a decree styled Presidential Act No. 17, which granted special remission of the prison sentences of certain categories of offenders, including imprisoned mothers who had minor children under the age of 12 years.

John Phillip Peter Hugo, who had served two-and-a-half years of an effective fifteen-and-a-half year prison sentence, was the only living parent of an 11-year-old son born in December 1982. He therefore would have qualified for remission had he been the child's mother, not his father. Hugo applied to the Supreme Court of South Africa to challenge the constitutionality of the Presidential Act. He contended that the Presidential Act discriminated against him unfairly on the ground of sex or gender – and therefore indirectly discriminated against his son on the ground of his parents' sex or gender – and therefore that it contravened sections 8(1) and 8(2) of the Interim Constitution, which guaranteed the right to equality.

Magid J of the Supreme Court's Durban and Coast Local Division upheld Hugo's application, finding that the Presidential Act discriminated unfairly against Hugo and his son. The President was ordered to correct the Presidential Act accordingly. The President and his co-respondent, the Minister of Correctional Services, appealed the Supreme Court's decision to the Constitutional Court of South Africa, where the matter was heard on 12 November 1996 and decided on 18 April 1997.

== Majority judgment ==
=== Unfair discrimination ===
The Constitutional Court's majority judgment was written by Justice Richard Goldstone, who overturned the Supreme Court's finding and upheld the President's appeal. His judgment opened with an exposition of the constitutional right to equality, including an oft-cited description of the purpose of the section 8(2) protection from unfair discrimination:

The prohibition on unfair discrimination in the interim Constitution seeks not only to avoid discrimination against people who are members of disadvantaged groups. It seeks more than that. At the heart of the prohibition of unfair discrimination lies a recognition that the purpose of our new constitutional and democratic order is the establishment of a society in which all human beings will be accorded equal dignity and respect regardless of their membership of particular groups. The achievement of such a society in the context of our deeply inegalitarian past will not be easy, but that that is the goal of the Constitution should not be forgotten or overlooked.

Thus, though men were not a disadvantaged group, they could nonetheless be victims of unfair sex discrimination. Indeed, the majority judgment agreed with the court a quo that the Presidential Act did discriminate against male prisoners – in fact, discrimination was inevitable in such a directive, because, "The line has to be drawn somewhere, and there will always be people on one side of the line who do not benefit and whose positions are not significantly different to those of persons on the other side of the line who do benefit." Moreover, because the Presidential Act discriminated on the ground of gender, section 8(4) of the Interim Constitution entailed that such discrimination was presumptively unfair unless the contrary was proved in court. Goldstone held that:

To determine whether that impact was unfair it is necessary to look not only at the group who has been disadvantaged but at the nature of the power in terms of which the discrimination was effected and, also at the nature of the interests which have been affected by the discrimination.

He concluded that the President had indeed proved that the discrimination was not unfair in these terms. In particular, the public interest and the administration of justice required that the scope of the presidential remission must be limited. Male prisoners outnumbered female prisoners almost fiftyfold, so the release of imprisoned fathers would mean the release of a very large number of prisoners. Moreover, the President had intended for the remission to serve the interests of children, and, because men were generally not their children's primary caretakers, the release of male prisoners "would not have contributed as significantly" to the achievement of this purpose as the release of mothers had. Finally, the impact of the discrimination on imprisoned male fathers was not severe: "The Presidential Act may have denied them an opportunity it afforded women, but it cannot be said that it fundamentally impaired their rights of dignity or sense of equal worth." Thus the Presidential Act was not unfairly discriminatory and Hugo had no justified complaint under section 8(2) of the Constitution.

=== Presidential prerogatives ===
Goldstone's judgment was also notable for its defence of the applicability of judicial review to the exercise of a presidential prerogative. The section 82(1)(k) power to pardon offenders was one of a list of powers granted by the Interim Constitution to the President in his capacity as head of state (rather than head of the executive). Like the others, it was historically a prerogative power of the English monarch. Goldstone found that, under South Africa's new constitutional dispensation, such prerogative powers flow directly from the Constitution and constitute executive powers – that is, their exercise constitutes an exercise of executive authority. Under constitutional supremacy, the court therefore had jurisdiction to review the exercise of any presidential power under section 82(1), and such exercise must comply with the Constitution and the Bill of Rights.

== Other judgments ==
Goldstone's judgment was joined by Justices Arthur Chaskalson, Ismail Mahomed, Laurie Ackermann, Pius Langa, Tholie Madala, and Albie Sachs. The same group, with Goldstone, also joined a separate concurrence written by Justice Kate O'Regan, which primarily elaborated on Goldstone's argument in response to a dissent by Justice Johann Kriegler. Kriegler dissented on the majority's finding of fairness, holding instead that the sex discrimination perpetrated by the Presidential Act was unfair.

In addition, Justice Yvonne Mokgoro wrote in a separate judgment that there was unfair discrimination, in violation of section 8(2), but that the violation was justifiable in terms of section 33(1); she therefore supported the majority's order upholding the appeal. Finally, in his own separate judgment, Justice John Didcott held that the matter was moot and that, per JT Publishing v Minister of Safety and Security, the court should not answer moot constitutional questions.

== Significance ==
Along with Prinsloo v Van der Linde (delivered on the same day) and Harksen v Lane, Hugo is regarded as one of the Constitutional Court's most influential early judgments on the right to equality (later enshrined in Section Nine of the Constitution of 1996). In Harksen v Lane (also written by Goldstone), the court confirmed and elaborated on Hugo's contention that the unfairness of discriminatory conduct must be determined with reference to the impact of the discrimination on its victims, and particularly with reference to its impact on the victims' dignity.

== See also ==
- Discrimination law
