= Fedsure Life Assurance v Greater Johannesburg Transitional Metropolitan Council =

South African legal case

- Court: Constitutional Court of South Africa
- Full case name: Fedsure Life Assurance Ltd and Others v Greater Johannesburg Transitional Metropolitan Council and Others
- Decided: 14 October 1998
- Citations: [1998] ZACC 17, 1999 (1) SA 374 (CC); 1998 (12) BCLR 1458 (CC)

Case history
- Appealed from: Witwatersrand Local Division

Court membership
- Judges sitting: Chaskalson P, Langa DP, Ackermann, Goldstone, Kriegler, Madala, Mokgoro, O'Regan, Sachs & Yacoob JJ

Case opinions
- Decision by: Chaskalson, Goldstone and O'Regan

Fedsure Life Assurance Ltd and Others v Greater Johannesburg Transitional Metropolitan Council and Others is an important case in South African law, heard in the Constitutional Court on 18 and 20 August 1998, with judgment handed down 14 October. The bench was occupied by Chaskalson P, Langa DP, Ackermann J, Goldstone J, Kriegler J, Madala J, Mokgoro J, O'Regan J, Sachs J and Yacoob J. DJB Osborn (with him PJ Van Blerk) appeared for the appellants, RM Wise (with him J. Kentridge) for the first respondent, and CZ Cohen (with him M. Chaskalson) for the second, third, fourth and fifth respondent.

== Principles ==
The interim Constitution recognises and makes provision for three levels of government: national, provincial and local. Each level of government derives its powers from the interim Constitution. In the case of local government, however, the powers are subject to definition and regulation by either the national or the provincial governments, which are the "competent authorities" for enacting such legislation. Under section 174(1) of the interim Constitution, though, there is a constitutional obligation on the "competent authority" to establish local government, which has to be "autonomous and, within the limits prescribed by or under law [...] entitled to regulate its affairs." In section 174(4), it is specifically provided that "Parliament or a provincial legislature shall not encroach on the powers, functions and structure of a local government to such an extent as to compromise the fundamental status, purpose and character of local government." In terms of section 175 (2), the competent authority is also obliged to assign to a local government "such powers and functions as may be necessary to provide services for the maintenance and promotion of the well-being of all persons within its area of jurisdiction." In section 175(4), the interim Constitution specifically provides that a "local government shall have the power to make by-laws not inconsistent with this Constitution or an Act of Parliament or an applicable provincial law." Section 178(2) gives local government a taxing power subject to certain conditions. The constitutional status of local government is thus materially different from what it was when Parliament was supreme, when not only the powers but the very existence of local government depended entirely on superior legislatures. Although the detailed powers and functions of local governments have to be determined by laws of a competent authority, this does not mean that the powers they exercise are "delegated" powers; nor does it prevent the powers from being regarded as "original" and not "delegated."

While section 24 of the interim Constitution applies to the exercise of powers delegated by a council to its functionaries, the court in the present case found it difficult to see how it can have any application to by-laws made by the council itself. The council is a deliberative legislative body whose members are elected. The legislative decisions taken by them are influenced by political considerations for which they are politically accountable to the electorate. Such decisions must, of course, be lawful, but the requirement of legality exists independently of, and does not depend on, the provisions of section 24(a). The procedures according to which legislative decisions are to be taken are prescribed by the Constitution, the empowering legislation and the rules of the council. While this legislative framework is subject to review for consistency with the Constitution, the making of by-laws and the imposition of taxes by a council in accordance with the prescribed legal framework cannot appropriately be made subject to challenge by "every person" affected by them on the grounds contemplated by s 24(b). Nor, the court found, are the provisions of s 24(c) or (d) applicable to decisions taken by a deliberative legislative assembly. The deliberation ordinarily takes place in the assembly in public, where the members articulate their own views on the subject of the proposed resolutions. Each member is entitled to his or her own reasons for voting for or against any resolution and is entitled to do so on political grounds. It is for the members, not the Courts, to judge what is relevant in such circumstances. Sections 24(c) and (d) cannot sensibly be applied to such decisions. The enactment of legislation by an elected local council in accordance with the Constitution is, in the ordinary sense of the words, a legislative and not an administrative act.

It seems plain, the court determined, that when a legislature, whether national, provincial or local, exercises the power, conferred by section 178(2) of the interim Constitution, to raise taxes or rates, or determines appropriations to be made out of public funds, it is exercising a power that under the Constitution is a power peculiar to elected legislative bodies. It is a power that is exercised by democratically elected representatives after due deliberation. Such action of the municipal legislatures, in resolving to set the rates, to levy the contribution and to pay a subsidy out of public funds, cannot be classed as administrative action as contemplated by section 24 of the interim Constitution. In the past, the action of a municipal council in setting rates was considered to be an action that was subject to judicial review on the principles of administrative law, but the principles upon which that jurisprudence was based are no longer applicable. It follows that the imposition of rates and levies, and the payment of the subsidies, do not constitute "administrative action" under section 24 of the interim Constitution.

== Judgment ==
The Court accordingly held that the rates imposed by the first respondent, the transitional metropolitan council, and its four metropolitan substructures, the levies paid by two of the substructures to the first respondent and the subsidies paid by the first respondent to the other two substructures, in terms of the powers conferred on them by the interim Constitution, read with Premier's Proclamations 24 of 1994 (Gauteng), 35 of 1995 (Gauteng) and 42 of 1995 (Gauteng), which were enacted in terms of section 10 of the Local Government Transition Act, did not constitute "administrative action" under section 24 of the interim Constitution.

The primary provisions of the interim Constitution regulating local government are contained in Chapter 10. To the extent, therefore, that a local government acts in breach of one of the direct and mandatory provisions of Chapter 10, it is clear that that infringement will be in breach of the Constitution and subject to constitutional challenge. Local government is also subject to Chapter 3 of the interim Constitution. It is also clear from Chapter 10 that the powers, functions and structures of local government provided for in the Constitution will be supplemented by powers, functions and structures provided for in other laws made by a competent authority. There is no doubt, the court held, that the common-law principles of ultra vires remain under the new constitutional order. However, they are underpinned (and supplemented where necessary) by a constitutional principle of legality. In relation to "administrative action," the principle of legality is enshrined in section 24(a) of the Constitution. In relation to legislation, and to executive acts that do not constitute "administrative action," the principle of legality is necessarily implicit in the Constitution. The question, therefore, of whether or not local governments act intra vires in imposing rates and levies, and paying subsidies, remains a constitutional question.

The Court held further that the applicants' constitutional challenge to the validity of the levying of the rates in question by the second respondent (the Eastern Metropolitan Substructure) based on the alleged non-compliance with section 178(2) of the interim Constitution and the challenge to the validity of the budgets of the first and second respondents, based on non-compliance with section 58 of the Local Government Ordinance 17 of 1939 (T), had on an analysis of the facts to fail. The Court held that the rates had been validly imposed.

The Court further held that the imposition of a levy by the first respondent on the second respondent in an amount equal to the budgeted surplus of the second respondent for the financial year ended 30 June 1997, and the use of that levy to meet the deficits in the budgets of the first respondent and two other of the first respondent's metropolitan substructures (the fourth and fifth respondents), could not be justified as "a grant or donation" under section 79(15)(i) of the Local Government Ordinance, as that had not been the decision which the council of the second respondent had taken. The council had considered the draft budget on the assumption that it fell within the powers of the first respondent to levy a contribution upon the second respondent for the purpose of subsidising itself and the fourth and fifth respondents. It was not known what the attitude of the members of the second respondent's council would have been had they been faced with a decision to make a donation or grant: That question was never before the council of the second respondent. Furthermore, the difference between the two was one of substance and not merely one of form.

Whether item 23(c) of Annexure A to Premier's Proclamation 35 of 1995 (Gauteng), which is the same as item 23(c) of Schedule 2 to the Local Government Transition Act 209 of 1993, is construed as a condition for raising a levy prescribed in the Local Government Transition Act by a competent authority as contemplated by section 178(2) of the interim Constitution, or as a power vested in the Greater Johannesburg Transitional Metropolitan Council independently of section 178(2), the "levy," held the court, has to comply with the provisions of item 23(c).

As to the question of whether or not the levy raised by the first respondent against the second and third respondents complied with the requirement of item 23(c), namely that it was "an equitable contribution from" the substructure "based on the gross or rates income of such" substructure, the Court was evenly divided. In a joint judgment by Chaskalson P, Goldstone J and O'Regan J (Ackermann J and Madala J concurring), it was held that meaning and significance had to be attributed to the distinct requirements of item 23(c). The mere fact that a levy might be said to be equitable in all the circumstances did not dispense with or detract from the stipulation that it had also to be based on gross or rates income. It was further held that the word "based" in item 23(c) implied that there should also be some relationship between the calculation of the levy and the incomes referred to. The levy imposed by the first respondent on the second and third respondents was not fixed as a proportion or a percentage of either gross or rates income; nor was it related directly in any way to either gross or rates income. The levy was a surplus produced from the total income after agreement had been reached as to the expenditure to be incurred by the second and third respondents: To read "gross or rates income" as meaning "net income after allowing for all expenses of the substructure" was to ignore the inclusion of the words "gross or rates" in the phrase, and thereby to do violence to the provision as a whole. The levy was accordingly not based on gross or rates income, and therefore did not comply with the requirements of item 23(c).

Per contra, Kriegler J (Langa DP, Mokgoro J, Sachs J and Yacoob J concurring) held, firstly, that the attack on the imposition of the levy based on the contention that it fell foul of the requirement of section 178(2) of the interim Constitution, because it was not "based on a uniform structure for its area of jurisdiction," could not succeed. It could not be said that anything other than a uniform structure had been applied. The very purpose of the co-ordination of the budgets of the first respondent and its four substructures (the second to fifth respondents) had been to apply a uniform method of estimating both the income and the expenditure of each substructure. It was an express component of that method that each budget would be balanced and that such balance would be attained uniformly by taking away any excess and supplementing any deficit. What section 178(2) required was a uniform structure on the basis of which revenue was to be raised, not identical rates or tariffs. There had in the present case been a uniform basis for charging all municipal imposts throughout the metropolitan area. The challenge based on non-compliance with section 178(2) failed. Secondly, with regard to the alleged non-compliance with item 23(c) of Annexure A to Proclamation 35 of 1995, it was held that there was no ground for suggesting that the levy was not fair and should be set aside on the ground of inequity. It was further held that item 23(c) used a phrase of wide generality to link the contribution to the income, namely "based on." It had not been specified that the levy had to be a fraction or percentage of income, and all that was required was some relationship between contribution and income. The uniform structure referred to above entailed accepting a platform above which a levy would be imposed on a substructure and the common platform above which the levy was payable was a substructure's estimated expenditure. The amount of the levy was also related to the substructure's gross income. The excess of such gross income over and above expenditure constituted the levy. That the levy equalled the surplus did not—and could not in logic—mean that the levy was not related to the gross income; on the contrary, gross income was the very basis for its calculation. It was not correct, as the judgment of Chaskalson P, Goldstone J and O'Regan J had it, that this conclusion entailed reading "gross or rates income" as meaning "net income after allowing for all expenses of the substructure." The contribution was not based on net income; it was indeed the net income based on gross income and expenditure. The levy on each of the substructures was clearly a surplus produced after account had been taken of the expenditure budgeted for by that substructure. That surplus was based on gross income. Accordingly, the levy was clearly based on the gross or rates income of each of the substructures. In the result the appellants' attacks based on the alleged non-compliance with the requirements of section 178(2) of the interim Constitution and item 23(c) of Annexure A to Proclamation 35 of 1995 had to be dismissed.

The Court accordingly held that, because it was unanimous that the rates levied by the second respondent were lawful, the attack made on them by the appellants had to be dismissed. As the Court was evenly divided on the lawfulness of the contributions levied by the first respondent on the second and third respondents, the appeal on those issues was not successful and had to be dismissed. In the result, the appeal as a whole had to be dismissed.

Having regard to item 17 of Schedule 6 to the Constitution of the Republic of South Africa Act 108 of 1996, it is in the interests of justice that in respect of constitutional issues under the interim Constitution which may in future come before it, the SCA, as the successor of the Appellate Division, should exercise the jurisdiction conferred upon it over constitutional matters by Chapter 8 of the 1996 Constitution. Its exercise of that jurisdiction, however, will not affect the principle articulated in S v Mhlungu and Du Plessis v De Klerk in terms of which the constitutionality of an act is to be determined by the substantive provisions applicable at the time.

The decision in the Witwatersrand Local Division, in Fedsure Life Assurance v Greater Johannesburg Transitional Metropolitan Council, was thus confirmed.

== See also ==
- Constitutional law
- Constitution of South Africa
- Law of South Africa
- Local government
