= Promotion of Administrative Justice Act, 2000 =

The Promotion of Administrative Justice Act (PAJA) is an important piece of South African legislation, and the cornerstone of administrative law in South Africa.

== Administrative action ==
The South African Law Commission’s draft Administrative Justice Bill described the concept of "administrative action" widely: any action or decision performed by an organ of state or any exercise of public power other than executive, legislative or judicial action. The definition of administrative action ultimately enacted in PAJA was "considerably more complicated and qualified." Section 1 of the PAJA defines administrative action as "any decision taken, or any failure to take a decision, by

- "an organ of state, when
  - "exercising a power in terms of the Constitution or a provincial Constitution; or
  - "exercising a public power or performing a public function in terms of any Legislation; or
- "a natural or juristic person, other than an organ of state, when exercising a public power or performing a public function in terms of an empowering provision, which adversely affects the rights of any person and which has a direct, external legal effect, but does not include
  - "the executive powers or functions of the National Executive [...];
  - "the executive powers or functions of the Provincial Executive [...];
  - "the executive powers or functions of a municipal council;
  - "the legislative functions of Parliament, a provincial legislature, or a municipal council;
  - "the judicial functions of a judicial officer of a court referred to in section 166 of the Constitution or of a Special Tribunal established under section 2 of the Special Investigating Units and Special Tribunals Act, 1996 (Act No. 74 of 1996), and the judicial functions of a traditional leader under customary law or any other law;
  - "a decision to institute or continue a prosecution;
  - "a decision relating to any aspect regarding the appointment of a judicial officer, by the Judicial Service Commission;
  - "any decision taken, or failure to take a decision, in terms of any provision of the Promotion of Access to Information Act, 2000;
  - "any decision taken, or failure to take a decision, in terms of section 4(1)."

Currie and De Waal write that, "although one begins with the definition of ‘administrative action’, the enquiry into the scope of application of the Act does not end there." Because administrative action as defined is confined to "decisions," "one must also consider the definition of 'decision' in s 1." In turn, because the definition of "decision" confines decisions to conduct "of an administrative nature" in terms of an "empowering provision," "it must be read with the definition of 'empowering provision.'" Finally, because "decision" includes failure to take a decision, the definition must be read with the definition of "failure" (which includes a refusal to take a decision).

In summary, an action will qualify as an administrative action under the PAJA if it is

- a decision
- by an organ of state (or a natural or juristic person)
- when exercising a public power or performing a public function
- in terms of any legislation (or in terms of an empowering provision)
- that adversely affects rights;
- that has direct, external legal effect; and
- that is not specifically excluded by the list of exclusions in the definition of administrative action.

Procedurally fair in terms of the Promotion of Administrative Justice Act 3 of 2000 is discussed as follows; Sections 3 (1) provides that an administrative action which materially and adversely affects the rights or legitimate expectations of any person must be procedurally fair. (2)(a) A fair administrative procedure depends on the circumstances of each case. Procedurally fair in terms of Promotion of Administrative Justice Act 3 of 2000 is discussed as follows: Section 3 (1) provides that an administrative action which materially and adversely affects the rights or legitimate expectations of any person must be procedurally fair. (2)(a) A fair administrative procedure depends on the circumstances of each case.

== Criticism ==
In 1993 Baxter argued that a

genuinely participatory, responsive, accountable, affordable and efficient system of administrative decision-making is attainable in South Africa, and every South African, no matter how poor or disadvantaged, is entitled- to nothing less. The new system of government must, of course, be tailored to the limited resources available. But those multitudes of South Africans, who have too long had to endure the insult of second- and third-class citizenship, should not now be prepared to settle for second- or third-class administrative justice and accountability.

Cora Hoexter believes that

"the Constitution and, to a lesser extent, the PAJA have brought about a good deal of the reform Baxter hoped for. Indeed, in many ways expectations reasonably held in the years before 1994 were exceeded by the sweeping nature of the constitutional reform that actually took place."

The Constitution offers a multitude of checks on the use of public power at every level, and the administrative system today is replete with safeguards against secrecy, arbitrariness, and maladministration. "While some of these safeguards may not be functioning optimally, it may seem absurd to ask for more at this stage of South Africa’s development."

On the other hand, "there is no room for complacency—particularly given the growing menace of public corruption, which is rightly regarded as the greatest challenge currently confronting South Africa." The problem of corruption and its pernicious effects have been acknowledged by the Constitutional Court. In Glenister v President, the court noted that corruption blatantly undermines the democratic ethos, the institutions of democracy, the rule of law and the foundational values of South Africa's nascent constitutional project, fuelling maladministration and public fraudulence and imperilling the capacity of the state to fulfil its obligations to respect, protect, promote, and fulfil all the rights in the Bill of Rights. The court emphasised that corruption demands "an integrated and comprehensive" response from the legal system. "Such a response would certainly include strengthening and improving the safeguards."

"Unfortunately," several important innovations proposed by the Law Reform Commission in its draft Bill of 1999 were rejected or heavily watered down by the legislature when the PAJA was enacted early in 2000, either for lack of funding or for fear of the burdensome nature of some of these proposals that would have been imposed on an unprepared government. For instance, a requirement that administrators take steps to communicate their rules to those likely to be affected by them was dropped from the PAJA altogether—"rather pointlessly, too, for the accessibility of such rules is an express requirement of the Constitution as well as an ineluctable requirement of the rule of law." Where the Law Commission’s draft Bill created an Administrative Review Council (ARC) and placed it under a duty to make recommendations for reform on certain subjects within two or three years, the PAJA merely gives the Minister discretion to make regulations establishing an advisory council which may advise her on certain reforms. This power has not been exercised. The idea of non-judicial review, for instance, remains "a purely theoretical possibility." That is "unimportant, perhaps, but what is especially regrettable is that no progress seems to have been made with the reform of the existing system of administrative appeals. Reform is urgently needed in this area if the system is ever to function as a worthy adjunct and alternative to judicial review."

Several innovations in relation to rulemaking, inspired by the work of both O’Regan and Baxter, were also watered down in the Act. One was a requirement that the State Law Adviser compile and publish protocols for the drafting of rules and standards and, in conjunction with the ARC, provide training to the drafters of rules and standards. Earlier versions of the Bill went even further than this in providing for the establishment of a Central Drafting Office, a proposal made in 1993 by O’Regan. This office would not only have performed the functions allocated to the State Law Adviser in the final bill but would also have been responsible for scrutinising the text of rules and standards and making recommendations to advance the clarity of the text. In its 1999 Report on Administrative Justice, the Commission explained that the proposals were scrapped because "the Department of Justice has suggested that the functions of the Office can better and more cheaply be performed by several specially appointed State Law Advisers." The Portfolio Committee on Justice "unfortunately jettisoned the less onerous and less expensive option as well."

Other reforms in the bill included a requirement that administrators compile and maintain up-to-date registers and indexes of rules and standards used by them, and a duty on the ARC to keep a national index of rules and standards, which would be published on the internet as well as in the Government Gazette. Earlier versions of the bill were "even more ambitious," in that they provided for the automatic lapsing of rules and standards within certain periods in terms of "sunset" provisions. These were dropped by the Law Commission in favour of a clause requiring the ARC to investigate the feasibility of sunset clauses. Again, PAJA is "more cautious still." In terms of it the Minister may ask the advisory council (if he ever establishes such a body) to advise him on matters such as the appropriateness of publishing uniform rules and standards, the maintenance of indexes and registers and "the appropriateness of requiring administrators, from time to time, to consider the continuance of standards administered by them and of prescribing measures for the automatic lapsing of rules and standards." It is "encouraging," writes Hoexter, that the scrutiny and control of delegated legislation are still being investigated by Parliament as well as by the Law Commission, "but frustrating that some of the interim recommendations made by Parliament’s Joint Subcommittee on Delegated Legislation are almost identical to recommendations made by the Law Commission and rejected by the Portfolio Committee on Justice more than a decade ago."

"Fortunately," she adds, not all the innovations proposed by the Law Commission were subject to this fate. However, in the case of certain reforms "it is still too soon to tell what effect they are having on the administrative system, while others are necessarily of a continuing nature." PAJA’s introduction of essentially voluntary procedures to facilitate public participation falls into the first category. "It is too early to say whether notice and comment procedures, and public inquiries or other participatory procedures are even likely to be used by administrators." Likewise, "one can only speculate about the future effects of the code of good administrative conduct." A code was produced recently in accordance with section 10(5A) and (6) of the PAJA, and has been accessible as a draft document for some time, but is not yet in force.

In relation to reforms of a continuing nature, "the most important are surely educating South Africans on administrative law and, more specifically, giving administrators training on the PAJA." Notwithstanding the downgrading of the Law Commission’s proposal in this regard, "progress was made at an early stage." Justice College, the training institution of the Department of Justice, began holding train-the-trainer workshops and courses for administrators shortly after the PAJA was enacted. Initial awareness-raising workshops allowed the trainers to identify problem areas, which were then addressed in practical training. The main objectives of the training were to ensure that participants had a clear understanding of the Act and would be able to comply with its provisions in practice and to motivate participants to implement the Act, which included changing attitudes regarding the way administrative decisions are made. Wessels recalls that the workshops revealed some quite alarming ignorance, such as the fact that many administrators had never set eyes on the empowering legislation in terms of which they were making decisions. "Anecdotes like this one," writes Hoexter, "indicate the importance of sustaining and expanding educational initiatives, several of which are currently being implemented under the auspices of the Department of Justice."

In spite of all that has been achieved, "it is clear that work remains to be done." However, the prospects of further programmatic reform of administrative law and the administrative system are "slim." Doubts were expressed some years ago as to whether the Department of Justice has the capacity to take on the various tasks listed in section 10(2) of the PAJA. In the absence of an administrative-law champion such as an ARC, "South Africa is reliant on the will of the Minister of Justice to push for reform and on the government’s preparedness to provide funding for such reform. Given the many challenges currently confronting the Department of Justice, the refinement of administrative justice seems unlikely to become a priority."

== See also ==
- South African administrative law
