= Criminal Procedure Act, 1977 =

South African act

Parliament of South Africa
- Long title: Act to make provision for procedures and related matters in criminal proceedings.
- Citation: Act No. 51 of 1977
- Enacted by: Parliament of South Africa
- Assented to: 21 April 1977
- Commenced: 22 July 1977
- Status: In force

The Criminal Procedure Act, 1977 (Act No. 51 of 1977) is an act of the Parliament of South Africa that governs criminal procedure in South Africa's legal system. It details the procedure for the whole system of criminal law, including search and seizure, arrest, the filing of charges, bail, the plea, the testimony of witnesses and the law of evidence, the verdict and sentence, and appeal.

The act is also in force in Namibia, which inherited it from the South African administration of South-West Africa. Administration of the act was transferred to the SWA government in 1979, and since then the South African and Namibian versions have diverged through amendment. A new Namibian Criminal Procedure Act was passed in 2004 but has not yet come into force.

== See also ==
- Criminal procedure in South Africa
- National Forensic DNA Database of South Africa
- South African criminal law
