= Law of evidence in South Africa =

Governs which facts may be presented at trials and inquests, and how

The South African law of evidence forms part of the adjectival or procedural law of that country. It is based on English common law.

There is no all-embracing statute governing the South African law of aspects: Various statutes govern various aspects of it, but the common law is the main source. The Constitution also features prominently.

All types of legal procedure look to the law of evidence to govern which facts they may receive, and how: civil and criminal trials, inquests, extraditions, commissions of inquiry, etc.

The law of evidence overlaps with other branches of procedural and substantive law. It is not vital, in the case of other branches, to decide in which branch a particular rule falls, but with evidence it can be vital, as will be understood later, when we consider the impact of English law on the South African system.

== Admissions ==
The general rule is that the parties must prove their cases by evidence. Admissions constitute an exception to this rule.

An admission is a statement by a party which is adverse to that party's case. The party in question does not have to realise that something is adverse to his case for it to qualify as an admission. Whether or not something is adverse to a party's case can depend on the context.

One cannot, by definition, admit something in one's own favour.

Admissions may be divided into two categories: formal and informal.

- Formal admissions are in a way part of the proceedings in a case. Examples include a plea in a criminal case, a formal admission under section 220 of CPA in a criminal case ( 220 Admissions :An accused or his or her legal adviser or the prosecutor may in criminal proceedings admit any fact placed in issue at such proceedings and any such admission shall be sufficient proof of such fact) and pleadings in a civil case. They can be used against a party, and they constitute conclusive proof of the facts they cover.
- Informal admissions are extra-curial statements by a party which can be used against that party during legal proceedings. They do not constitute conclusive proof of the facts they cover, but they can constitute an item of proof. They are put in the scale and assessed at the end of the case. Sometimes informal admissions can be made in very formal circumstances, as when a suspect appears before a magistrate out of court in order to make a statement about his alleged involvement in an offence.

=== Informal admissions ===
Below are the requirements for the admissibility of informal admissions.

In civil cases, the only requirement is relevance. Additionally, where statements are made in the course of settlement negotiations, they may not be received without the consent of the party making them. See Naidoo's case.

In criminal cases, the requirements are

- that the statement be relevant; and
- that it have been made voluntarily.

Admissions may be made verbally or in writing, or they may be inferred from conduct, or in any combination of these ways.

==== Admissions by conduct ====
===== Silence =====
Common sense may indicate that the silence is in effect an admission of an accusation. Note, however, the effect of the Constitution in criminal cases.

===== Failure to answer letters =====
The courts will not as readily conclude that failure to respond to a letter is an admission by silence as in the case of a failure to deny orally. Surrounding circumstances must permit the reasonable inference that the failure to respond can be equated with an admission, as in commercial practice, especially when there has been correspondence on an issue.

===== Statements made in the presence of a party =====
The reaction of a party may be put before the court, including such reactions as silence and denial with uncomfortable demeanour. Note the possible effect of section 35 of Constitution in criminal cases.

===== Failure to challenge in cross-examination =====
See S v Mathlare and S v Boesak.

==== Vicarious admissions ====
Previous admissions by third parties are sometimes admitted as vicarious admissions: that is, admitted against a party even though not made by that party.

The three main situations in which they were admitted were

1. where there is implied or express authority to make the admission;
2. where the litigant adopts the statement of the third party and ratifies it as his/her own; and
3. where the litigant and a third party shared privity or identity of interest.

The SCA has now held that such statements are generally not admissible, on the grounds that they are hearsay. They only become admissible if the court exercises its power to admit hearsay evidence under Law of Evidence Amendment Act.

Below are some categories where vicarious admissions have been held to be admissible:

- Express or implied authority:
  - Agents and servants
  - Partners
  - Legal representatives
  - Spouses
  - Referees

Evidence by a director or trustee in an insolvency or similar inquiry under company legislation is not binding on others.

- Privity or identity of interest:
  - Predecessors in title
  - Master and servant
  - Nominal and real parties

Even if Mdani stands as law, it is possible that the courts would allow such evidence in the future on the basis of their power to admit hearsay evidence in certain circumstances.

==== Executive statements ====
Statements made in execution of conspiracy or common purpose have been admitted against co-conspirators. The judgment of Squires J in S v Shaik allows an executive statement to be received in evidence, but unfortunately does not deal in detail with the legal principles, or reconcile the principle with constitutional values. Although it is not entirely clear, the SCA in the Shaik appeal seems to say that executive statements which are adduced to prove the truth of their contents should be dealt with under the statutory law relating to hearsay evidence.

==== Statements made without prejudice ====
In course of negotiations to reach compromise in a civil dispute, parties sometimes make statements "without prejudice." For policy reasons such statements are not admissible in civil proceedings. To qualify for inadmissibility such statements must be made in a bona fide attempt to reach a settlement.

==== Admissibility of statements not amounting to full confessions by accused in criminal trial ====
At common law, statements made informally by the accused are only admitted if proved to have been made freely and voluntarily. "Freely and voluntarily" means only that the statement has not been induced by threat or promise from someone in authority.

A threat or promise per se is insufficient to render the statement inadmissible, if it did not influence the mind of the accused.

==== "Person in authority" ====
This term has been interpreted in two ways:

1. On the restrictive interpretation, it refers to any person whom the accused might reasonably believe is able to influence the course of the prosecution, like a police official, a prosecutor, a magistrate, a complainant, etc.
2. S v Robertson gave it an extended meaning, referring to any person with some measure of authority over accused, like parent or dominant gang member. Les Roberts believes that this one will continue to be preferred.

Separate rules apply for statements qualifying as confessions. The Constitution, in section 35(1)(c), may well provide an opportunity for courts to overrule the arbitrary distinction previously made between the admissibility of confessions and the admissibility of admissions.

See S v Orrie and S v Molimi.

==== Onus of proving that statement made freely and voluntarily ====
At common law, the onus is on the State to prove beyond reasonable doubt that statement was made freely and voluntarily.

Section 219A of the CPA purports to place an onus on the accused to show that an admission made in writing was not made freely and voluntarily if it appears ex facie the document that it was made freely and voluntarily. The Constitutional Court has ruled, in S v Zuma, that similar provisions for confessions are unconstitutional; almost certainly it would rule similarly in the case of admissions.

==== Method of determining in criminal trial whether admission made freely and voluntarily ====
Admissibility is determined by way of a "trial within a trial," on the basis of evidence led by the parties on this specific issue, in a form similar to that of a trial proper. See the case of S v Andile and another.

=== Formal admissions ===
The general rule is that parties must prove their case by evidence. Formal admissions constitute an exception to this general rule.

The rationale for formal admissions is that they save time and costs. The system encourages people to admit facts which are not in dispute, so that the trial is not derailed and unnecessarily delayed by extraneous and superfluous issues.

==== Distinct from informal admissions ====
Informal admissions, on the one hand, are usually made out of court, although they can be made in formal settings (even to a magistrate, for example); that, however, does not make them formal. Formal admissions, on the other hand, are usually made as part of the pleadings, or in the court itself.

Informal admissions constitute merely an item of evidence helping to prove the other party's case, whereas a formal admission, once made, is conclusive proof of the fact admitted.

The weight to be accorded to an informal admission depends on the circumstances. Formal admissions cannot be withdrawn or contradicted without compliance with certain formalities.

Formal admissions need to be clear and unequivocal, because of their implications.

==== Formal admissions in civil trials ====
Formal admissions may be made during pleadings, or during the trial itself. Section 15 of the CPEA provides that it is not necessary for a party to prove a fact formally admitted; nor is it competent to disprove a fact so admitted.

Withdrawal of formal admission is only possible in the event of compliance with formalities. The court will only allow withdrawal if satisfied that it was a bona fide mistake, and that there is no prejudice to opposing party.

The party seeking withdrawal must give a full and satisfactory explanation for the withdrawal, supported by evidence (like an affidavit).

Even after withdrawal, a formal admission may still be taken into account as an item of evidence; it may still constitute an informal admission, in other words.

==== Formal admissions in criminal trials ====
===== Formal admissions under s 220 of CPA =====
In criminal trials, either side (the defence or the prosecution) may now make formal admissions in favour of the other side. They are made under section 220 of the CPA.

Previously statutory provision was made only for the defence to make admissions, although at common law it was accepted as a matter of practice that the State could also make admissions.

Section 220 has now been amended to cover admissions made by either side. Section 220 provides that formal admissions are “sufficient proof” of the facts they cover.

In S v Malebo, Hiemstra CJ held that "sufficient proof" meant conclusive proof. Therefore, a formal admission under section 220 immediately became conclusive of the fact covered thereby.

In S v Sesetse, however, the Appellate Division held that an admission only becomes conclusive proof at end of the trial.

Not much turns on this disagreement.

Withdrawal of a formal admission in criminal trial is possible, if the formalities have been complied with, but a withdrawn admission may still have some evidentiary value.

There is a need for clarity: Formal admissions should be worded and recorded carefully, to eliminate ambiguity. A formal admission need not necessarily be in writing, but this is preferable, for the purposes of clarity.

If there is any ambiguity, the general principle is that the interpretation in the accused's favour is to be applied.

A formal admission by the accused does not bind the State to a meaning fundamentally at variance with the State's case.

===== Plea of guilty =====
A plea of guilty itself constitutes a type of formal admission.

Once a plea of guilty is altered to one of not guilty under section 113, any admissions already made, and not affected by the section-113 ruling, “shall stand as proof thereof.” They are unaffected or unchanged by the conversion of the plea to one of not guilty.

Section 113 provides for the setting aside of a plea of guilty in a wider variety of situations than those covered by the withdrawal of other formal admissions: for example, if the court thinks that there is any valid reason why the plea of guilty should not stand.

===== Plea of not guilty =====
If the accused gives a plea explanation, in terms of section 115 of the CPA, he is asked by the presiding officer whether anything not placed in issue by the plea explanation may be formally recorded as an admission under section 220. If it is so recorded, it is the same as any other section 220 admission.

Even if the accused does not so agree, the admissions remain evidential material, and are similar to informal admissions; indeed, they have the effect of an informal admission.

===== Generally =====
Courts should be wary about accepting formal admissions from an unrepresented accused on points beyond the personal knowledge of the accused. This occurs all too often in practice. The accused's presence at the scene of the crime is within his personal knowledge; the veracity of the blood tests is obviously not.

==== Admissions during cross-examination (civil and criminal) ====
Explicit assertions by the cross-examiner may constitute admissions, eliminating the need for proof. For example, in a traffic case for negligence, the defendant's counsel may put it to a witness that the client, although he admits to driving the other vehicle, denies any negligence. This would constitute an admission that the defendant was the driver. This underscores the need for caution and care in cross-examination.

PJ Schwikkard and SE van der Merwe consider such admissions to be formal admissions, and rely on AD authority.

For an example of an admission by a cross-examiner, see Zungu's case.

==== Summary ====
The first thing to decide is whether an admission is formal or informal. If there is no conclusive proof in this regard, in a criminal trial one must ask if it is a confession or not. Having answered this question, one has passed the point of no return; one cannot retrace one's steps back to this proverbial fork in the road.

== Confessions in a criminal trial ==
A confession is a special type of informal admission in a criminal trial. It has been defined as an unequivocal admission of guilt, equivalent to plea of guilty in a court of law.

The CPA creates special rules for the admissibility of confessions. In terms of section 217, a confession is admissible only if made

- freely and voluntarily;
- in sound and sober senses; and
- without undue influence.

There are stricter requirements here than for an ordinary admission.

In S v Nkanyezi, Judge Luyanda Xulu held that there are secondary requirements needed to be complied with for confessions made in terms of Section 217(1)(a) and 217(1)(b).

In addition, a confession to a peace officer, other than a justice of the peace—that is, to a police official lower than the rank of officer (a captain or higher)—is not admissible unless it is confirmed and reduced to writing in the presence of a magistrate.

The rationale for the exclusion of confessions not complying with section 217 includes considerations of

- unreliability;
- the principle that person should not be made to incriminate himself—reasons of policy, in other words; and
- the Constitution.

Courts have tended to take a strict view of what a confession is. They have tended to regard a statement as not being a confession if there is any opening for a valid defence.

What if the accused intends to make an exculpatory statement, but in fact it objectively amounts to a confession? Previously there was some debate on this issue, but now it has been decided that such statements are to be judged objectively.

In deciding whether a statement amounts to a confession, the surrounding circumstances must be looked at, to get the full context.

Even if the statement does not constitute an unequivocal admission to the main charge alleged, but objectively constitutes a full admission to some lesser charge (competent verdict), this will amount to confession, and section 217 will apply.

=== Requirements of s 217 of CPA ===
==== Freely and voluntarily made ====
This expression is given the same interpretation as at common law.

==== Sound and sober senses ====
Does accused appreciate what he/she is saying? (Consumption of alcohol or loss of temper does not per se lead to the conclusion that accused was not in sound and sober senses.) See R v Blyth

==== Without being unduly influenced thereto ====
There must be no external factor operating to extinguish accused's freedom of will.

Undue influence need not emanate from person in authority. Violence, or threat of violence, would clearly constitute undue influence.

The concept also includes subtler influences such as the promise of some benefit, or an implied threat or promise.

Influences which come from the accused herself do not constitute undue influence: for example, an expectation by the accused that he will receive more favourable treatment if a confession is made.

Courts have regarded this requirement as being a subjective one: Was the accused in fact influenced?

Improper threats or promises which did not in fact influence the accused will therefore not automatically render the confession inadmissible.

Failure to advise the accused of his rights at the time of the arrest can be taken into account to decide whether there was improper influence.

A person taking a confession is not obliged to interrogate the interviewee in order to exclude the possibility of undue influence.

==== Statutory compulsion ====
Previously courts have held that statements made under statutory compulsion do not fall foul of the requirement that statements be free of undue influence.

How does this fit in with right not to incriminate oneself in s 35(3)(j) of Constitution?

==== Additional requirement for confessions to peace officers ====
Section 217(1) of the CPA contains a proviso: Confessions to peace officers who are not magistrates or justices of peace are not admissible unless confirmed and reduced to writing before magistrate.

In practice this means that confessions to police officials below officer rank—that is, up to and including the rank of inspector, and below the rank of captain—will not be admissible unless confirmed and reduced to writing before a magistrate.

The rationale for this is the elimination of the undesirable practice of enforced confessions, and "trial by police station" instead of trial by court.

The meaning of "peace officer" is defined in section 1 of the CPA. It includes magistrate, justice of peace, police officials and other categories.

The proviso to section 217(1) exempts from the prohibition those peace officers who are also magistrates or justices of peace. Police officials of commissioned-officer rank (lieutenant and higher) are also justices of the peace, and therefore included in the exemption. In practice, therefore, the exclusion of confessions applies to constables, sergeants and warrant officers in the SAPS, as well as to certain categories of other officials referred to in definition of "peace officer." For ease of reference those officials affected by the disqualification will henceforth be called "disqualified officials."

The proviso to s 217(1) only excludes statements made to disqualified officials. The mere presence of a disqualified official when a confession is made does not render that confession inadmissible. For example, if a disqualified official is in the presence of a more senior police official who is also a justice of the peace, or acting as interpreter for such more senior police official when the confession made, or present when a confession is made to a private person, the confession would be admissible, if other admissibility requirements have been met.

The proviso to s 217(1) states that confession to a disqualified official becomes admissible if it is subsequently confirmed and reduced to writing in the presence of a magistrate or justice of the peace. In practice, if it is so confirmed and reduced to writing before a magistrate or justice, it is regarded as a new confession, and the inquiry will be about whether that confession complies with the usual admissibility requirements.

Confessions to police officials who are also justices are permissible.

In practice, it is far preferable to have the suspect taken before the magistrate if there is to be a confession. It is especially undesirable to have the confession made to a commissioned officer who is involved in the investigation.

If the maker of the confession is unaware that the person to whom he makes the statement is a police official, the proviso is not applicable.

==== Burden of proof for confessions in criminal cases ====
At common law, the State has the burden of proof beyond a reasonable doubt. Section 217(1)(b) of the CPA made two changes:

1. A confession to magistrate (note the non-inclusion of a justice of peace—is admissible on its mere production, without need for further proof, if certain requirements are met).
2. A confession to magistrate is deemed to be freely and voluntarily made, in sound and sober senses, without its maker's having been unduly influenced thereto (unless the contrary is proved), if it appears ex facie document itself that it was freely and voluntarily made, in sound and sober senses, without having been unduly influenced thereto.

In S v Zuma, the Constitutional Court struck down the second of these changes as being unconstitutional, because it sought to introduce a reverse onus. The first was not struck down, but on its own it does not do much.

The effect is that common-law onus (beyond reasonable doubt) once again applies.

==== Procedure to prove confession admissible ====
A confession is proved to be admissible by way of a "trial within a trial," whereby each side leads evidence, and then argues on its admissibility.

The content of the confession itself usually cannot be placed before court at this stage, unless exceptional circumstances apply, as in S v Lebone, where it was necessary to refer to the contents of the confession to refute the allegation made by the accused that he had been coached by the police as to what to say.

Evidence at a trial within trial is not per se admissible at the main trial, whether the confession is allowed or excluded. If the confession is ruled admissible at the trial within a trial, the evidence to prove the confession still has to be led at the main trial.

==== Inadmissible confession subsequently becoming admissible ====
Generally an accused cannot waive the admissibility requirements of a confession. But section 217(3) of CPA renders an inadmissible confession admissible if the accused adduces evidence, whether in chief or in cross-examination, of the confession, and the court considers that that part of the evidence so adduced is in favour of accused.

==== Facts discovered in consequence of inadmissible confession ====
Section 218 of the CPA provides as follows:

1. Evidence may be admitted even if discovered in consequence of an inadmissible confession or admission.
2. Evidence of pointing out, or anything discovered in consequence of pointing out, is admissible even if the pointing out is part of an inadmissible confession.

The rationale for this is that, while confession evidence improperly obtained may be unreliable—the person may confess, for example, to avoid some harm or threat of harm—concrete evidence discovered in consequence thereof, or pointing out, etcetera, is not so tainted: There is no threat to reliability.

This rationale does not give value to section 35(5) of Constitution, which clearly envisages that improperly-obtained evidence may be excluded, even if otherwise reliable.

Previously the courts took the view that whatever led to the pointing out was irrelevant. The pointing out itself was admissible.

Now courts look to the nature of the pointing out, to see if it is in fact a disguised admission or confession.

Since the advent of constitutionalism, section 35(5) of the Constitution may lead to the exclusion of evidence as unfair, or likely to bring the administration of justice into disrepute, even if section 218 of CPA would allow it.

==== Confession only admissible against maker ====
A confession is only admissible against its maker.

== Private privilege ==
Privilege—note the Latin etymology of the word—refers to a personal right to refuse to give or disclose otherwise admissible evidence. A witness, otherwise compellable, is not obliged to answer certain questions. See Ferreira v Levin.

Privilege is different from other rules that exclude evidence. Such other rules tend to exclude because of some doubt about reliability, whereas privilege excludes evidence because it aims to protect some higher value than the search for truth. The granting of privilege is therefore not lightly made.

The principle of privilege is aimed, for policy reasons, at protecting the rights of individuals.

It is to be distinguished from competence and compellability. In the case of privilege, the witness may not refuse to testify at all; he may refuse only to answer a particular question or questions.

Private privilege may be waived, but courts require confirmation that the person so waiving is aware of his rights. The court must be satisfied of this before it will allow such waiving.

The courts are reluctant generally reluctant to grant privilege. The more privilege they grant, the more hampered they are in getting to the bottom of the matter.

Below are some categories of private privilege:

- the privilege against self-incrimination;
- legal professional privilege (or litigation privilege or attorney-client privilege); and
- marital privilege.

On the question of whether or not other professions enjoy privilege, see below. On the question of whether there is parent-child privilege, see below.

=== Privilege against self-incrimination ===
One may not be made to say something that incriminates oneself. This is the natural consequence or corollary of the presumption of innocence, and it applies both to criminal and to civil cases. Sometimes, in civil cases, one might be in danger of saying something that could lead subsequently to one's criminal prosecution. Privilege protects one in such circumstances.

The privilege against self-incrimination originates in the unpopularity of the harsh Star Chamber in England, which forced suspects to talk when interrogated under oath. This was abolished, as a result of growing opposition (since the politically powerful aristocracy were often victims of the Star Chamber), in 1641. The principle against self-incrimination became very important to English system thereafter.

The United States Supreme Court, in the case of Miranda v Arizona, held that the constitutional foundation for the privilege is the respect that government must accord to the dignity and integrity of its citizens. This decision came after the accused had been asked and made to answer self-incriminating questions by the police. Now suspects in the US must be "mirandised."

==== Criminal proceedings ====
===== Witnesses =====
The privilege against self-incrimination, as it applies to witnesses in criminal proceedings, is governed by section 203 of the CPA, which refers to position in South Africa as at May 30, 1961. What this means is that one must look to English law, as interpreted in South Africa, at the time.

A witness is privileged only against replying to questions which may criminally incriminate him, not those which might only involve civil liability.

The rule of practice in South Africa is that courts should warn or inform witnesses of the privilege when the issue arises. In S v Lwane, the accused, and others involved in the robbery of a training store, fled from the scene of the crime and when they had reached what they took to be a safe distance began dividing up the loot. An argument broke out about its distribution. One of them pulled out a knife and stabbed Lwane, who was sent to hospital. The police opened a charge at Lwane's instance against his stabber. (At this stage the police were not yet in possession of sufficient proof of the earlier murder and robbery; they were just concerned with Lwane's stabbing.) At a preparatory examination (then common, now very rare) of Lwane as the complainant, he had recounted the events of the day in question, including the fact that he and his partners had robbed the shop. No-one had warned him of the privilege against self-incrimination. At this point the preparatory examination was abandoned, and Lwane was sent to trial, where evidence of his remarks at the examination was led. He was duly convicted, and appealed to AD, which noted the absence of any warning of the privilege. The court found that this made a crucial difference, and it would be unfair to incriminate him on the basis of something he would not have said had he been aware of his rights. The court held that the correct rule of practice had not been observed, and that, since the remaining evidence was not convincing, the conviction ought to be set aside.

When the issue arises, the court is obliged to establish whether there is a proper basis for the claim that the accused cannot answer without incriminating himself. The court must be satisfied on reasonable grounds that the answer may incriminate the witness. In Magmoed v Janse van Rensburg, a very important case, a policeman had been giving evidence at inquest, after a number of people had been shot dead by the police. The policeman refused to answer the question of whether or not he had been in charge on day in question, but his claim of privilege was not upheld. On appeal it was held that it ought to have been.

If the witness is warned under section 204 of the CPA, the privilege falls away: The witness is then given the right to earn an indemnity in exchange for taking away the privilege against self-incrimination. For example, if while housebreaking one sees a murder occurring, one may be indemnified against incriminating oneself in providing evidence of the murder. This is a question of State strategy: The murder is obviously the more serious offence. Once the procedure in section 204 has been correctly followed, the witness loses the privilege, but gains indemnity against any future prosecution on that charge. This can be controversial: Glenn Agliotti was famously called as a witness against Jackie Selebi in terms of section 204, and admitted to having paid a bribe. It could be argued that in such circumstances the bigger crook is allowed to get away with it.

After a warning under section 204, the privilege falls away. In exchange for losing the privilege, the witness earns the right to indemnity. Section 204 is available only to the State, not to the defence.

The privilege falls away also if the witness has already been indemnified—he might have given the same evidence in an earlier trial—or has already been acquitted or convicted. This is so because the witness is not in any jeopardy; there is no increase in his risk of self-incrimination. What applies in such circumstances is the principle of autrefois acquit or autrefois convict. There is therefore no need for the witness to be indemnified twice.

Section 204 does not violate the right to a fair trial. In S v Suliman, it was argued that it does so violate; the court disagreed.

===== Accused =====
At pre-trial stage, accused not obliged to say anything therefore has a right to remain silent; right not to incriminate himself: S v Melani; S v Mathebula.

This privilege does not extend to bodily characteristics of accused, which may be obtained under s 37 of CPA: Ex parte Minister of Justice: in re R v Matemba Levack v Regional Magistrate, Wynberg

Bail proceedings: accused can decline to answer incriminating questions: court has duty to inform accused of this right: s 60 (11B)(c) of CPA. What is the position if accused is not expressly informed of this right, and incriminates himself during bail proceedings? Best view appears to be that such evidence would not be automatically excluded: Du Toit et al: commentary on s 60 (11B)(c): Why exclude if it is clear that accused understood the position perfectly? Makes sense especially in the case of accuseds who already know of this right, or are well versed in the law.

During trial stage:

• Accused can but is not obliged to give plea explanation: s 115 of CPA • Accused not obliged to testify, although failure to testify comes with attendant risks and disadvantages: S v Boesak. Court might have to decide the matter on only one side’s version of events. • If accused does elect to testify, cannot refuse to answer relevant and otherwise admissible questions.

==== Civil proceedings ====
In civil proceedings, the witness has a wider protection by virtue of privilege than in criminal cases. He can refuse to answer questions which would incriminate, or would expose him to “penalties or forfeiture.” Under section 14 mere exposure to a civil claim is insufficient to raise privilege. “Penalties or forfeiture” means something other than mere civil liability. For example, you would incur a penalty in the running of your business, or be forced to forfeit your passport. But mere civil liability or indebtedness is not covered by the privilege.

=== Legal professional privilege ===
Most South African writers and cases treat this as one branch of privilege. Zeffertt et al., in Chapter 17 of their book, treat it as two separate branches. This article treats it as one branch with different rules for different situations.

Legal professional privilege applies to both criminal and civil cases.

The basic rule is that communications between a lawyer and a client may not be disclosed without the client’s consent. The communications “belong” to the client, not to the lawyer. It is the client’s choice to consent to or refuse their disclosure.

The rationale for this privilege is that society sees the need for lawyers to help resolve civil and criminal disputes. Lawyers could not do their work properly if there were a danger that they could be forced to disclose communications with their clients.

This is a fundamental right of procedural justice. It existed even before advent of the constitutional dispensation in South Africa, but it has even greater importance in that context.

The following are a few of the requirements for legal professional privilege to operate:

- The person to whom the communication is made must be a legal adviser. To seek legal advice from a non-lawyer is therefore not a good idea if privilege is an important consideration.
- The legal adviser must be acting in his professional capacity a such. That something is said to a lawyer does not automatically make it privileged information; it must have been said to a lawyer acting as a lawyer. Whether or not a lawyer was acting in professional capacity depends on the facts of each case. In S v Kearney, where Kearney was charged with various white-collar crimes, involving business that had gone sour. Much money was lost, leading to his prosecution. Prior to the trial, there arose and was heard a civil dispute on a similar set of facts, during which Kearney was called as a witness by one of the parties. During preparation for him to give evidence, he had a consultation with legal counsel, and said certain things relevant to the criminal matter. The legal counsel was subsequently called during the criminal trial. Kearney objected to this, but the court said there was nothing amiss, since the legal counsel in question was not Kearney's legal counsel.
- The communication must have been made in confidence. If you shout out the information at top of your voice to your lawyer, such that everyone hears it, you cannot realistically claim privilege. Much the same applies if a police officer is present during the communication between lawyer and client.
- The communication must have been made either for the purpose of obtaining professional legal advice, or for the purpose of pending litigation.

Payment or non-payment of fees to legal counsel is not automatically decisive. The situation appears to cover communications to salaried legal advisers.

Whether or not the communication was made in confidence depends on the facts of each case. Whether or not it was made for the purpose of legal advice, again, depends on facts of each case.

There will be no privilege if the statement made for the purpose of furthering some criminal plan. In Harksen v Attorney-General, Cape, Harksen had sought advice from a lawyer so as to further a criminal plan, asking the lawyer for the best way to avoid detection or prosecution. It need not be the case that the lawyer is complicit, or aware of the purposes to which his advice was to be put.

The privilege belongs to the client, not to the legal adviser, although the legal adviser would usually raise privilege in the first place.

The privilege falls away if there is waiver, express or implied or imputed, by the client. The legal adviser in that case must give the evidence, since his client has consented to its disclosure. S v Tandwa is an important case on the imputed variety. Tandwa was one of a number of accused charged with a big bank robbery. Tandwa was the bank manager, and it was contended that he was complicit. Tandwa chose not to give evidence at the trial, and was convicted. On appeal, he claimed that the trial had been vitiated by irregularity: Counsel had closed the case without allowing him to give evidence, which would have been a gross dereliction of duty on part of counsel. Counsel said that this was not so, but Tandwa contended that counsel was not allowed to say that, owing to privilege. Judge Edwin Cameron told Tandwa that he was not permitted to have it both ways, for policy reasons. It had therefore been imputed that Tandwa had waived his privilege.

Privilege attaches not just to communications with legal advisers, but also to communications with the employees of legal advisers, like clerks, secretaries and interpreters. In S v Mushimba, such an employee had been passing on privileged information to the police. After a conviction, this came to notice of the Appellate Division, which set aside the conviction on the basis of gross irregularity.

The privilege also attaches to communications between legal advisers and third parties gathering potential evidence at the instance of legal advisers for clients, for the purpose of litigation. An example would be where a legal adviser hires a private detective to obtain certain information for use in contemplated litigation. This is what Zeffertt et al. refer to as litigation privilege. This privilege only arises once the litigation is contemplated, unlike the ordinary type of legal professional privilege, which can come into existence prior to the contemplation of litigation.

Section 37 of the Financial Intelligence Centre Act expressly preserves legal professional privilege despite the stringent reporting requirements of the Act.

=== Other professional privilege ===
At common law, other professionals, such as doctors, accountants and ministers of religion, are not covered by professional privilege.

There is some argument that under the new constitutional dispensation communications with such professionals ought also to be covered by privilege.

In England, there is recent authority to the effect that professional privilege does not extend beyond the legal profession.

In South Africa the courts have on occasion given some protection to this type of situation by applying section 189 of CPA. Under this section the court may refrain from punishing a recalcitrant witness if there is a “just excuse” for his not testifying. This development is not on all fours with legal professional privilege: Under section 189, the court has held that a receiver of communication is not bound to testify where it would clash with professional ethics; the court did not say, however, that this protection covered the maker of the communication. The section-189 situation is different from privilege in that it is not a blanket legal protection, but a decision not to punish in a given situation.

=== Marital privilege ===
Marital privilege is covered by section 198 of the CPA and section 10 of the CPEA. It originates in public policy.

Note the meaning of "marriage."

The privilege only covers communications made during the course of the marriage.

The privilege attaches to the spouse receiving the communication.

Section 199 of CPA and section 12 of CPEA extend the privilege to a spouse who may decline to answer any question which the other spouse may lawfully have declined to answer.

=== Parent/child privilege ===
At common law no special privilege attaches to the parent-child relationship.

If, however, a parent assists a child accused in criminal proceedings, the privilege attaches, as the parent is then in a similar position to a legal adviser.

In the US the courts have recognised a constitutional right to confidential communications between parent and child.

Under section 14 of the South African Constitution (on the right to privacy), there is scope for the development of such a right in South Africa.

== State privilege ==
Is State privilege truly a privilege? It might rather be described as an exclusion of certain categories of evidence on the grounds of public policy, in that admission of such evidence would be harmful to the public interest.

The English case of Duncan v Cammell Laird, which concerned sinking of HMS Thetis, is important in this regard. It concerned litigation by widows and dependants during World War I, the accident having occurred before the war. The plaintiffs wanted to access the plans of the submarine so that they could prove their case. The Ministry of Defence said that this was a sensitive matter, invoking Crown privilege and arguing, accordingly, that it could not be adduced in court. The House of Lords (deciding the case at the darkest point of the war) held that, once the decision to invoke Crown privilege is made in the proper form, it may not be questioned.

In South Africa, this is usually described as State privilege. In the United Kingdom it used to be called Crown privilege, but is sometimes referred to today as "public interest immunity."

Below are some distinctions between State and private privilege:

- Secondary evidence is permissible to prove issues covered by private privilege, but not those covered by State privilege.
- Private privilege may be waived; State privilege may not.
- Private privilege must be claimed by the holder thereof, whereas State privilege is to be upheld by the court mero motu if necessary.

=== Development in English common law ===
In Duncan v Cammell Laird, the House of Lords held that the court could never question a claim of State privilege, if the privilege was claimed in the proper form. But note the extreme conditions prevailing when this decision was taken.

In Conway v Rimmer, twenty-five years later, the House of Lords revisited the issue and reasserted judicial control. The court said it had been wrong in Duncan; court must always apply its mind; must always make up its own mind as to whether the circumstances justify State privilege. This case involved a probationary policeman who was not going to have his probation confirmed; he wanted access to confidential staff files that the police had on his performance, that he might make his case stronger thereby. The Minister issued a certificate invoking Crown privilege. This was challenged. The court a quo said it was bound by Duncan, and for perhaps the first time the House of Lords revisited an earlier decision. What could be the harm to the State, it asked, if the performance of an individual policeman is put on table? It might be slightly embarrassing, but it was no national security issue. It was for the court to decide, and the court decided in casu that records should be revealed.

The context and prevailing circumstances in these two were important, especially as regards national security; indeed, they were probably decisive.

=== Development in South Africa ===
Duncan v Cammell Laird was binding on South Africa, but the Appellate Division, in Van der Linde v Calitz broke away from the House of Lords authority, deciding that the court had the final say. This decision anticipated Conway v Rimmer. South Africa got there first, in other words, in remarkably similar circumstances, involving a fairly junior official working for the Free State provincial administration. Periodic reports were made on staff performance, and the official in question had been given a rating which upset him, so he sued for defamation. He wanted to get hands on confidential reports as to his performance, that he might prove his case. The court noted the absurdity of invoking national security on such an issue as this.

Parliament unhappy with this decision and passed legislation in 1969 to restore the situation to the Cammell Laird position. The executive had absolute and unquestionable power to block the disclosure of evidence, no reasons required. The Minister’s certificate was conclusive. In 1972 the legislation was relaxed somewhat, so that the ouster of the court’s power to decide applied only where national security at stake. National security, in other words, was again the decisive issue.

The General Law Amendment Act was replaced by section 66 of the Internal Security Act, which was repealed (on Parliament’s own initiative, without direction from the Constitutional Court) in 1996. The situation thus effectively reverts to Van der Linde v Calitz, subject of course to constitutional considerations.

Under the Freedom of Info Bill, 2010, section 46 leaves discretion to the court to order disclosure.

In the constitutional era, anything in the common law which conflicts with the Constitution will not be tolerated, unless it is a justifiable limitation.

Swissborough Diamond Mines v Government of RSA related to a diamond mining co-operative in Lesotho, whose government was going to interfere with its mining rights. The company wanted South Africa to pressure Lesotho not to do so. South Africa refused, and the company brought application against the South African government seeking information about the background. The government was opposed. The court applied its mind, ordered disclosure and enunciated some principles:

- The court is not bound by the ipse dixit of the Cabinet Minister.
- The court itself is entitled to scrutinise the evidence, in order to apply its mind properly.
- In making its decision, the court must balance the necessity of the evidence for the litigant against public interest. The greater the public interest in secrecy, the more likely the court will find the information to be sensitive, and therefore in keeping with State privilege.
- The onus should be on the State to show why disclosure should not be permitted.
- In a proper case, the court should call for oral evidence about reasons, in camera if necessary.

Schwikkard and Van der Merwe suggest two further requirements or principles:

1. There should be heavy onus on the State to motivate non-disclosure. There must be a likelihood of harm, not a mere possibility. The onus on the State is to justify the exclusion, not on the other party to justify inclusion or disclosure. In a proper case, the court can call for oral evidence about reasons for the exclusion, in camera if necessary.
2. The court, which may have privately inspected the documents in question, should consider the possibility of a partial disclosure, blocking out the sensitive parts.

Note the difference or distinction here from administrative law, which deals with access to information outside of the judicial arena. State privilege, in contrast, deals with whether certain information may be laid before the court by way of evidence.

In Independent Newspapers v Minister for Intelligence Services, the applicant had applied for the compelled public disclosure of restricted material contained in the records of certain court proceedings. The Minister objected to the disclosure on national-security grounds. The court held that a fair and objective assessment required the striking of a harmonious balance between the two competing claims—the applicant’s right to “open justice” and the constitutionally-derived power and duty of the executive to make and implement national-security policy. Although this case deals with sensitive state security issues, it is not about privilege as such.

=== Detection of crime ===
At common law the State is protected against disclosure of communications which would tend to reveal the identity of an informer or otherwise expose methods of detection of crime. The term “informer privilege” is often encountered when one species of this branch is under discussion. There are at least three reasons for the preservation of informer privilege:

1. protection of the informer and his family;
2. ensuring that the informer (usually “professional” informers, doing it on a permanent or semi-permanent basis) can be used in future; and
3. encouraging public to come forward and report crime.

Privilege against disclosure of methods to detect crime is needed to safeguard the criminal justice system.

The Appellate Division set certain bounds to informer privilege. In Pillay’s case, it held that the privilege only operates where public policy requires it, and will be relaxed, at least, in the following circumstances:

- when material to interests of justice;
- if necessary to show the accused’s innocence; and
- when the reasons for the privilege no longer exist, as when the identity of informer is already known.

Is informer privilege constitutional? In US the Supreme Court has held that it could be, provided it does not have effect of denying the accused a fair trial.

== Hearsay ==
The common-law definition of “hearsay” describes it as a statement made by someone who is not a witness before the court. Statements that constitute admissions do not fall under this definition, or under the statutory definition referred to below.

The common-law position is that hearsay evidence is generally excluded, subject to certain exceptions. (These exceptions became frozen in the course of time.) The issue in each case was to try to bring a situation within the ambit of a recognised exception.

The situation is now covered by statute, in section 3 of the Law of Evidence Amendment Act, which defines “hearsay” as “evidence, whether oral or in writing, the probative value of which depends upon the credibility of any person other than the person giving evidence.”

The first question raised by this definition is this: What is meant by “depends upon?” The answer seems to be that this phrase refers to the issue of whose credibility the probative value rests upon primarily.

Section 3 provides that hearsay is generally inadmissible, subject to a number of exceptions. The section lists a number of categories under which hearsay may be admitted:

- Section 3(1)(a): If there is consent to the admission of the evidence. “Consent” refers to the consent of the opposing party; it clearly does not denote the consent of the witness in question. “Consent” here seems to go further than explicit consent. (See, for example, the Thoroughbred Breeders case, where the failure to object was equated with consent.) The deliberate elicitation of material during cross-examination would also be regarded as consent to the admission of that material.
- Section 3(1)(b): Hearsay may be provisionally admitted if the court is informed that the person on whose credibility the evidence depends will be testifying later. Section 3(3) provides that, if that person does not in fact testify, the evidence will not be taken into account, unless it is admitted by consent or the court allows it under section 3(1)(c). For the rationale for this, see S v Ndhlovu. Although section 3(1)(b) does not make this clear, Ndlovu’s case does: The subsequent witness must actually testify about that which was earlier referred to as hearsay.

It is wrong for a party to lead provisional hearsay evidence if that party knows there is no prospect of the witness’s actually giving evidence.

Section 3(1)(c) refers to the general power of a court to allow hearsay evidence if it is in the interests of justice. This is the most important of the statutory exceptions, and most radical break with the past. It is not properly called a “discretion” to admit hearsay evidence. The court must admit it.

The court, in terms of section 3(1)(c), should consider six explicitly-mentioned factors as well as “any other factor.”

The explicit factors are the following:

- The nature of the proceedings: Are they civil or criminal? Is it an application as opposed to a trial? Is it bail proceedings, or perhaps an inquest? This does not mean that hearsay will never be allowed in criminal proceedings.
- The nature of the evidence: It seems that this factor refers to reliability.
- The purpose for which evidence is tendered. This has led to some disagreement.
- The probative value of the evidence: What will it prove, and how reliably?
- Why was evidence not given by the source itself? Reasons could include the death of the witness, a missing witness, poor health of the witness, or other unavailability. This factor is less vague than the others.
- Prejudice to opponents: What is meant by “prejudice”? The better view is that this refers to procedural, not substantive, prejudice.

Note the question: Would the admission of hearsay infringe on the accused’s right to cross-examine under section 35(3)(i) of Constitution? This is an important procedural right.

Take careful note of the case of S v Ndhlovu, where the SCA laid down some very clear policy provisions, and gave a very far-reaching decision. A gang was accused of murder and robbery; on arrest, some of its members made admissions to the police. One such admission proved to be particularly important. It was allowed in as evidence against its maker. On the State’s application, the trial court decided to admit the admission also against his co-accused. This proved decisive of the outcome of the case, which went on appeal to the SCA. Cameron JA wrote the majority judgment and provided some pointers:

- The presiding officer is under a duty not to allow hearsay wholesale; the basic principle is still that it is inadmissible.
- There is a need to explain the provisions to unrepresented accused. Accused must understand what is up.
- The party seeking to have hearsay admitted must apply timeously.

The SCA allowed the contents of the admissions by the accused numbers three and four to be used as evidence against accused numbers one and two.

See also S v Mokoena at 45-48 for a similar example of the court’s using its power to allow hearsay in the form of the proved statements of the co-accused.

In S v Mathonsi, the court admitted hearsay under this section in the form of a former inconsistent statement of a witness who had been discredited.

See note by Schwikkard in 2003 SALJ.

The SCA has recently cautioned against pushing Ndhlovu too far. But see the recent case of S v Rathumbu.

=== "Any other factor" ===
Principles of Evidence, in Chapter 14, suggests that common-law exceptions to the hearsay rule could be relevant under this heading.

See also S v Mnyama and S v Hewan.

For an illustration of the careful application of section 3(1)(c), see S v Shaik. See also S v Ralukukwe.

In S v Mpungose, the victim of a rape was killed in a manner suggesting that the purpose was to prevent her testimony. She had previously said something devastating, but hearsay, to the accused, who was subsequently convicted. This conviction was overturned on appeal.

=== Common-law exceptions to hearsay ===
There are two main categories under the common law:

1. statements by deceased persons; and
2. spontaneous exclamations.

=== Spontaneous exclamations ===
The basis for allowing spontaneous exclamations is their reliability. There are four main requirements:

- a startling occurrence;
- spontaneity;
- no reconstruction of past events permissible; and
- narrative parts excluded.

=== Statutory exceptions to hearsay ===
The following are the statutory exceptions hearsay:

- affidavits under section 212 of the CPA;
- Part VI of the CPEA (applied also to criminal cases via section 222 of the CPA); and
- birth and death certificates.

== Previous consistent statements ==
A "previous consistent statement" is a statement, written or oral, made by a witness prior to testifying, which corresponds with or is substantially similar to his testimony in court.

The general rule is that a witness is not allowed to testify about, nor may another witness be called to support, a previous consistent statement.

The rationale for the exclusion is the irrelevance of such statements, and their lack of probative value, and the ease with which they can be fabricated. To allow them would be to open the door to much time wasting and the exploration of collateral issues.

The rule is also known as the rule against self-serving statements.

Previous inconsistent statements are admissible against a witness, because they tend to show inconsistency, and thus unreliability.

An example of the application of the rule may be found in R v Roberts.

=== Exceptions to general rule ===
==== Rebutting suggestion of recent fabrication ====
"Recent" means after the event in question, and prior to testimony. The allegation may be made explicitly or by implication. Not every attack on credibility constitutes a suggestion of recent fabrication. The basis for allowing this evidence is relevance.

==== Complaint in sexual case in which there is a victim ====
A statement by a victim within a reasonable time of the event is admissible. It comes from medieval concept of "hue and cry." It applies both to female and to male victims, and it applies whether absence of consent is an element of offence or not.

The complaint must be voluntary. The victim must testify. The complaint must be made at first real opportunity.

Such statements have limited evidential value. They do not constitute corroboration.

Note that this issue is now governed by legislation. Evidence of previous consistent statements is admissible in sexual offence cases, but the court may not draw an adverse inference from the failure to make a complaint. Court also may not draw an adverse inference from the length of delay in reporting such an offence.

Note must be taken of expert evidence to show why people sometimes do not report such offences immediately. In Holtzhauzen, the alleged victim had wanted to lead the evidence of a hypnotist—this was not allowed—and an expert witness on why she had not come forward immediately. (This was allowed.) Prior to the commencement of the Criminal Law (Sexual Offences and Related Matters) Amendment Act, expert evidence was sometimes led to explain the delay in reporting. It could be argued that such evidence would no longer be necessary, in view of the explicit provisions of the new statute.

For critical discussion of this legislation, see Zeffertt et al in 2008 125 SALJ 642.

=== Identification ===
Such evidence is potentially problematic, since people make mistakes. In the case of dock identification of the accused, the witness can testify that he had previously identified witness, at an ID parade, for example. Others may also testify to show such prior identification by the witness.

=== Prior statements by the witness ===
These are sometimes admissible under Part VI of the CPEA, and are also applicable to criminal cases by virtue of section 222 of CPA. Such prior statements do not constitute corroboration of the witness.

=== Res gestae (the things that happened) ===
Sometimes the prior consistent statement is so closely related to res gestae as not to be permitted. In S v Moolman, Moolman was a policeman investigating stock-theft cases. He was very successful, because it turned out he had been torturing suspects to get them to confess. Put on trial, he was charged with numerous assaults. Moolman led evidence from his police pocket book; in other words, his notes. The court held, on appeal, that the pocket-book entries had been made as part of his daily routine, and were too intimately bound up with the events themselves.

=== Refreshing memory ===
Note here the requirement of the "primacy of orality"—viva voce evidence—and the general rule against proving previous consistent statements.

There are statutory exceptions, but it is not necessary to go into in detail on them here.

The common law covers the many areas not covered by those provisions. The common law allows for a quasi-exception, in the case of refreshing memory from a previous written statement.

It is important to distinguish between refreshing one's memory prior to giving evidence (always permitted, because this does not cause the possible privilege attaching to the statement to be lost) and refreshing one's memory in the witness box. What follows deals with latter situation.

The following requirements must be met before a witness will be permitted to refresh his memory from a prior written statement:

- He must have personal knowledge of the event.
- He must be unable to recollect unaided.
- Verification of document: must have been created by witness, but
  - actual recording of particulars may have been recorded by other person, who will also have to be called; or
  - witness must have verified accuracy whilst still fresh in witness's mind.
- The prior statement must have been made while the events were still fresh in the witness's mind. Strict contemporaneity is not required; what is fresh will be decided on facts of each case.

There is no need for the witness to have an independent recollection of the event or a portion of the event.

In the United States, a distinction is drawn, based on modern psychological theory, between "present recollection revived" and "past recollection recorded." This distinction is not watertight.

The South African courts have not yet gone into this distinction in any depth.

==== Status of document used to refresh memory ====
Note the correct status of the document used to refresh memory: At common law it does not constitute independent evidence, although in practice this distinction can be difficult to apply, as in the case, for example, of a professional report of a medical expert. It is, therefore, a “quasi-exception.”

Ideally, if the report of a witness is used, the witness should be asked to confirm and adopt it as part of his evidence.

== Similar-fact evidence ==
Similar facts are facts directed at showing that a party to proceedings (usually the accused) has acted in a similar way before, and is therefore more likely to have done what is alleged against him or her. For example, the accused has previously been convicted of shoplifting; therefore he is more likely to be guilty of shoplifting on this occasion. The issue can also arise in the case of people who are not the accused, as with the allegation that the police systematically tortured suspects in order to extract confessions from them.

Similar-fact evidence is usually inadmissible, on the grounds of irrelevance. It will only be admitted when it is both logically and legally relevant.

The policy reason for the exclusion of similar-fact evidence is that its prejudicial effect outweighs its probative value. Evidence of a previous conviction of the accused would be highly prejudicial, but it would have low probative value. Other possible reasons for exclusion are listed below:

- The court could get sidetracked into going into a large array of issues other than those immediately before it.
- Trials could be protracted.
- The accused would have to be ready to defend himself on a wide range of issues.
- It could discourage the police from investigating cases properly, by encouraging them to focus on past offenders rather than examining the evidence properly.

=== Formulation of rule ===
The case of Makin v Attorney General for New South Wales, decided in the Privy Council in the 1890s, is the leading case on the exceptional circumstances in which the courts will allow similar-fact evidence:

- Similar-fact evidence is not admissible merely to show a propensity to commit crimes.
- Even evidence which does show such a propensity is nevertheless admissible if it is relevant to the issue before the court: for example, whether certain events were designed or accidental, or to rebut some defence which would otherwise be open to the accused. In the Makin case, rather a lot of dead babies were lying around. This was rather suggestive of a design; it could not have been accidental.

This is known as the "Makin rule."

The Makin rule has been criticised as not accurately reflecting all the situations in which courts have allowed similar fact evidence in the past.

See, for example, R v Straffen, where the court came close to saying the accused was guilty because of two very similar murders he had previously committed. The court allowed evidence that he had previously done similar deeds, even though he had done them while in a state which excluded criminal culpability.

The better view seems to be that the Makin rule should have the following qualification added: "In some cases evidence which proves only a disposition will be admitted if on the facts it is a disposition highly relevant to the issue before court."

See R v Bond for a more helpful formulation than in Makin: "In proximity of time, in method or in circumstances there must be a nexus between the two sets of facts, otherwise no inference can be safely induced therefrom."

The court in DPP v Boardman approved expressly of the Makin rule, but in fact applied a more supple test: Similar-fact evidence is admissible where its probative value exceeds its prejudicial effect.

Lord Wilberforce's judgment provided as follows:

- Similar fact evidence is only admissible in exceptional circumstances.
- A strong degree of probative force is required.
- There must be such a striking similarity that the only possible inference is that the conclusion is true, or that it has been concocted by a witnesses, or that it is a sheer coincidence.

Below are some of the leading English cases:

- In R v Ball, a brother and sister were charged with incest, having been found in bed together in a flat. It could not be shown, however, that they were having intercourse. Evidence was allowed, though, that they had previously been convicted of incest.
- In R v Smith, the famous "brides in the bath" case, Smith had committed multiple bigamy offences. In each case, his bride was monied, and had made out will, leaving her possessions to Smith. On each of three cases, she had then suffered epileptic attacks and died in her bath. Smith was convicted, and the House of Lords confirmed his conviction, on the basis that this was all a bit too good to be true.
- R v Bond was decided when abortions were illegal. Bond was charged with having in his possession instruments that could have been used for abortion. He claimed that the opposition had not shown that the instruments were intended to be used for that purpose. The prosecution sought to get around this defence by showing that he had previously been convicted of illegal abortions.
- In DPP v Boardman, Boardman was a housemaster at an English school. He had been charged with sexually fooling around with the boys in their dorms. On one count, the evidence of a complainant was not very strong, but court said his evidence did not stand alone, since there was other evidence, and a pattern of strikingly similar circumstances.

In the South African case of S v D, the court applied DPP v Boardman, using the evidence on one count to prove another, because of the striking similarity of the accused's modus operandi. The accused in question was charged with a number of rapes and robberies in area of Johannesburg. In each case, when accosting his victim, he had gotten her to remove her valuables and then, before raping her, said, “Sleep down,” meaning “Lie down.” In one count, the witness was unable to identify him, but her description of what happened to her was so strikingly similar to other instances that, on similar-fact evidence, it was good enough. Note the distinction between this case and that of Makin.

For a good example of the Southern African application of these principles, see the recent case R v Sole. There was a dam construction in Lesotho, and Sole was a highly placed official, who oversaw contracts, etc. He started taking bribes, and was duly charged. The court said that on some counts the evidence against him was not strong, but if regard was had to the evidence on the other counts, it should be allowed. So the conviction followed even on the counts where the evidence standing alone would not have been strong enough.

Note that similar fact evidence is only permissible to resolve facts in issue. What is in issue will depend on the nature of the defence. For example, where the defence is an alibi, the presence or absence of the accused at the particular place is crucial, and similar fact evidence could conceivably be relevant. If the defence is self-defence, however, different considerations apply.

In the past, the courts have sometimes put cases into categories in order to decide whether similar fact evidence is admissible. There is a danger in this method, however, as principles cannot always be easily pigeonholed. It is nevertheless useful to note these categories.

The following are some of the categories under which the exceptions were dealt with:

- Res gestae: Certain acts form part of the transaction. If acts were so closely connected to the crime charged as to be relevant to explain it, they may be allowed in evidence: for example, a series of assaults.
- Presence at a place, or possession of a weapon: The commission of another offence shortly before or after the charged offence is sometimes allowed to prove the accused's presence at scene. For example, the accused is charged with possessing a weapon, and evidence is allowed that he had used it for a criminal purpose shortly before or after the commission of the charged offence.
- Previous course of dealing: The nature of the transaction between parties may not be understandable without reference to previous dealings. For example, a person approaches a drug dealer and asks for "the usual."
- Proof of motive: For example, an accused is charged with theft, the allegation being that he stole the money to cover previous thefts. In such a case the prosecution would be allowed to prove the previous thefts in order to show motive.
- Sexual passion: In R v Ball, as we have seen, previous acts of incest were allowed in as evidence to show the likelihood that the accused had been committing incest on this occasion.
- Acts of preparation: In R v Troskie, too, the accused was charged with incest with his sister. Evidence was allowed that he had previously attempted to have sexual relations with her. See also R v Hair, where the accused was charged with the theft of shares. Evidence was allowed that he had forged certain documents in order to obtain them.
- Corroboration of witness on material point: In R v D, the accused was charged with sodomy with a young boy. The boy said the accused had shown him indecent pictures. Evidence was allowed that such photographs were found in the accused's house. In S v Banana, evidence was allowed on one count of sodomy to corroborate evidence on another count (striking similarity).
- Corroboration of a confession: In R v Evans, the accused was charged with murdering a child. He had made a confession to murdering the wife and child. Evidence of both confessions was allowed to corroborate the confession about killing child.
- Knowledge: In R v Keller & Parker, the accused was charged with selling pieces of glass as diamonds. Evidence that the accused had previously attempted to sell glass as diamonds was allowed to show that the accused had guilty knowledge.
- Intent: In R v Pharenque, the accused was charged with buying goods on credit without the intention to pay. Evidence was allowed of previous convictions for similar conduct, to show that the accused had no intention of paying.
- Design or system: In R v Khan, the accused was charged with murder during a robbery. Evidence was allowed that some months previously the accused had invited a witness to join him in a robbery on the deceased.
- Accident or mistake: R v Smith, discussed above, also applies here. In R v Mortimer, the accused was charged with deliberately running down a female cyclist. Evidence was allowed that he had recently run down several other female cyclists.
- Identity: In Thompson v R, the accused was charged with an indecent act on young boys. He said the young boys had been mistaken about his identity. Evidence was allowed that he had had indecent photographs and powder puffs in his possession when arrested. This evidence confirmed the identity evidence by the young boys.
- Innocent association: In R v Sims, the accused was charged with indecency committed with four different men in his house. The accused denied the charges; he said the men had come to visit for innocent purposes. Evidence was allowed on one count to corroborate the other counts, that there was no innocent association.
- Innocent possession: In R v Armstrong, the accused was charged with poisoning his wife with arsenic. His defence was that he had bought the arsenic innocently, and that his wife must have tried to commit suicide with it. Evidence was allowed that, soon after his wife's death, he tried to poison someone else with arsenic.

Note the two different types of situation that can arise in practice:

- the Makin-type situation, where evidence is admitted of other events not otherwise before court; and
- the use of the evidence before court on one count to prove or corroborate the evidence on another count.

In the first situation, the issue will arise at the stage when the similar-fact evidence is sought to be admitted.

In the second, the similar fact evidence is already legitimately before court. The issue will be whether the court may take it into account when considering the strength of the case on the other count, as in DPP v Boardman.

Note that in certain jurisdictions in the United States there has been radical statutory intervention in the common-law rule relating to certain types of crimes (especially sexual crimes), allowing much more evidence of previous deeds. A similar provision in California led to the admission in the Michael Jackson trial of evidence of alleged prior misconduct in circumstances where it would probably have been excluded under common-law rules.

In England the common-law rules have been repealed and replaced by recent statutory provisions. These provisions seem less radical than those in the US. Because of statutory amendment to the English common law rules, it is likely that future English cases on the point will be of less relevance to South African law.

=== Similar fact evidence in civil cases ===
The issue of similar fact evidence can also arise in civil cases. The applicable rules are substantially the same as in criminal trials, but in practice the courts tend to be more inclined to accept such evidence, as the prejudicial aspect is less problematic.

In Delew v Town Council of Springs, Delew did not believe the council was right about the amount of power he had consumed. The court excluded similar-fact evidence.

In Laubscher v National Foods, Laubscher sued the producer of animal food, since his animals, after consuming it, had subsequently died. He wanted to lead evidence that others who had bought food from the same source had suffered the same kinds of trouble. The court said no.

In Gosschalk v Rossouw, there was an alleged assault by the police on a detainee.

== Entrapment ==
This issue is covered by section 252A of the CPA.

There are two main policy issues behind this provision:

1. Officers of the State should not be allowed to commit offences in the course of investigating a crime, except under circumstances strictly controlled.
2. Obtaining of evidence should be fair to the accused and comply with the Constitution.

This is the common-law meaning of entrapment: "A trap is a person who, with a view to securing the conviction of another, proposes certain criminal conduct to him, and himself ostensibly takes part therein. In other words he creates the occasion for someone else to commit the offence.”

Entrapment could be called a “pro-active investigation technique.” It is not a case of passively waiting for a crime to be committed; it is the active instigation of a crime. It can be controversial, especially when traps lure the accused into buying contraband.

At common-law, entrapment is no defence. The court is more inclined on common-law principles to evince its displeasure with the police by giving a light sentence.

Note, however, the potential clash with section 35(5) of Constitution: Is the trial fair in such circumstances? South Africa has chosen not to go the route of recognising a defence of entrapment, but rather to regulate entrapment by way of legislation dealing with the admissibility of entrapment evidence.

In S v Kotze, the police received information that a diamond racket was going on in a town. They set up a trap, using a policeman from their diamond branch. He infiltrated the group, having been formally processed out of the police service. (This made it look as if he had been ousted.) For the first nine months of the operation, he set himself up as part of the community; operations started thereafter. After several more months, the police had secured many prosecutions. Kotze, a high-profile member of the community, was caught buying diamonds from the trap, but it turned out he was also intimately involved in the racket. On appeal to SCA, with the evidence overwhelmingly against him, he argued that under the legislation he had been caught unfairly. The SCA did not agree.

Section 252A of the CPA, enacted in 1996, governs traps and undercover operations. Note that the legislation does not define either of these concepts.

Section 252A(1) provides that traps may be used to detect, investigate or uncover the commission of any offence, or to prevent the commission of any offence.

Evidence thus obtained is admissible if it does not go beyond providing an opportunity to commit an offence. Even, however, if the evidence does go beyond that limit, the court has a discretion to allow it.

Section 252A(2) sets out the circumstances which will be taken into account—this is not, however, a “brightline test”—to determine whether the evidence goes beyond a mere opportunity to commit an offence:

- whether the prior approval of the DPP has been obtained, and whether there has been compliance with the guidelines or instructions laid down by the DPP;
- the nature of offence;
- the availability of other techniques;
- whether an average person in the position of the accused would have been induced;
- the degree of persistence of the trap or agent;
- the type of inducement, since too great and disproportionate an inducement might constitute too great and disproportionate a temptation;
- the timing of the conduct, in particular whether the official instigated the offence, or became involved in an existing offence;
- whether there was exploitation of human characteristics or frailty;
- whether there was exploitation of a particular vulnerability, like a mental handicap or substance addiction;
- proportionality, in that the conduct must bear some relation to the harm caused by the crime;
- any threats by the official;
- any prior suspicion against target;
- good or bad faith on part of the official or agent; and
- any other factor.

Note the illogicality of some of the criteria.

See Hammond for an example of how the listed factors are to be assessed.

See S v Reeding for consideration of the meaning of “going beyond mere opportunity of committing offence.”

See also S v Van den Berg, but also S v Kotzè, which is less critical of the provisions.

In terms of section 252A(3), a court may exclude evidence going beyond a mere opportunity to commit an offence if it considers

- that the evidence was obtained in improper or unfair manner;
- that the admission of the evidence would render the trial unfair;
- that the admission of the evidence would be otherwise detrimental to the administration of justice.

In coming to this conclusion, the court has to weigh up the public interest against the interests of the accused.

For a proper interpretation of section 252A(3), see S v Kotzè, where the prosecution conceded that the conduct in question had gone beyond a mere furnishing of an opportunity.

=== Guidelines by DPP ===
The DPP may issue general or specific guidelines on the conduct of traps. There are two considerations here:

1. the likelihood of compromising the prosecution’s case; and
2. the likelihood of harm to society.

Note that it is not obligatory for the DPP to issue guidelines.

=== No criminal liability on part of trap ===
A trap does not incur criminal liability who acts in good faith.

There may be no prosecution, without the written authority of the DPP, of a trap who possibly exceeds the good-faith requirement.

=== Onus to show admissibility ===
The prosecution bears onus of showing admissibility, but only on a balance of probabilities. This is in contrast to the normal onus to show admissibility beyond reasonable a doubt. The statute, in other words, has lowered the onus. This onus is of doubtful constitutionality. In S v Kotzè, the facts of the case did not make it necessary to consider this issue, but the court said obiter that the onus ought to be beyond reasonable doubt, and also stressed need for compliance with section 252A(6). The accused must be given an indication of basis of challenge. See also S v Naidoo, where the court held that the onus is beyond reasonable doubt.

Note that there is a duty on the accused to set out the grounds of objection.

The method of determining admissibility is, generally, by way of a trial within a trial.

Some cases dealing with section 252A include

- S v Hammond;
- S v Mkhonto;
- S v Odugo; and
- S v Makhanya.

=== Criticism of s 252A ===
There has been some criticism of section 252A, mainly on the basis that it appears to conflict with section 35(5) of Constitution, in that it seems to apply different admissibility requirements to those set out in that constitutional provision.

=== Trap evidence treated with caution ===
It is a basic principle of the common law that the courts are to treat trap evidence with caution.

A confession to an undercover police official is not hit by the proviso to section 217 of CPA.

=== Entrapment in civil cases ===
Note that section 252A of the CPA does apply to civil cases.

Previously the common law did not disallow evidence in civil cases which had been secured by entrapment. The question now is whether the court has any discretion to disallow such evidence.

The courts have begun to develop a discretion to disallow trap and other evidence obtained in violation of constitutional rights.

== See also ==
- Law of South Africa
- South African civil procedure
- South African criminal procedure
