= FNB v Lynn =

South African legal case

- Court: Supreme Court of South Africa, Appellate Division
- Full case name: First National Bank of SA Ltd v Lynn NO and Others
- Decided: 30 November 1995
- Citation: [1995] ZASCA 158; 1996 (2) SA 339 (SCA)

Case history
- Appealed from: Natal Provincial Division

Court membership
- Judges sitting: Joubert JA, Nestadt JA, Van den Heever JA, Olivier JA, and Van Coller AJA

Case opinions
- Decision by: Joubert JA

First National Bank of SA Ltd v Lynn NO and Others is an important case in South African contract law, especially in the area of cession. It was heard in the Appellate Division of the Supreme Court by Joubert JA, Nestadt JA, Van den Heever JA, Olivier JA and Van Coller AJA on 19 September 1995, with judgment passed on 29 November. M. Tselentis SC (with him AC Thompson) was counsel for the appellant; Malcolm Wallis SC (with him LB Broster) appeared for the respondents.

== Cession ==
Cession is a particular method of transferring rights in a movable incorporeal thing in the same manner in which delivery (traditio) transfers rights in a movable corporeal thing. It is in substance an act of transfer (Afrik oordragshandeling) by means of which the transfer of a right (translatio iuris) from the cedent to the cessionary is achieved. The transfer is accomplished by means of a transfer agreement (oordragsooreenkoms) between the cedent and the cessionary arising out of a iusta causa from which the former's intention to transfer the right (animus transferendi) and the latter's intention to become the holder of the right (animus acquirendi) appears or can be inferred. It is an agreement to divest the cedent of the right and vest it in the cessionary.

Logically speaking, as the court noted in the present case, a non-existent right of action or a non-existent debt cannot be transferred as the subject-matter of a cession. The parties may agree in the obligatory agreement to cede and transfer to the cessionary a future or contingent right of action (spes futurae actionis), or a future or conditional debt (debitum conditionale, debitum futurum) as and when it comes into existence and accrues or becomes due and payable, whereupon it will be transferred to the cessionary. If it never comes into existence it will amount to a non-existent right of action or a non-existent debt which cannot qualify as the subject-matter of a cession.

== Facts ==
On 31 December 1984, N (Pty) Ltd executed a deed of cession in securitatem debiti in favour of First National Bank (FNB). The deed was headed '"Cession of Book Debts" and provided that N Ltd did

hereby cede, assign, transfer and make over to and in favour of [the bank ...] all our right, title and interest in and to all and any moneys and amounts which may now [be] or which may hereafter become due and owing to us by any person whomsoever as security for the fulfilment of all obligations undertaken by us to the bank and as security for the payment of all money now and from time to time hereafter owing by us to the bank for any cause of debt whatsoever [...]. In order to give effect to the cession herein contained, we hereby nominate, constitute and appoint the bank irrevocably and in rem suam to be our attorneys and agents, with full power and authority for use and in our name or in its own name to demand, sue for, recover and receive all debts or sums of money whatsoever which now or hereafter may become due, owing, payable or belonging to us.

N Ltd, the contractor, thereafter entered into a construction contract with the Government of QwaQwa for the construction of a public road. By 29 August 1990, the contractor had completed all work in terms of the contract. A certificate of completion was issued on 27 August specifying a sum of money that was to be retained by the employer government against defective work and for maintenance for a period of one year. At the expiry of this period, 27 August 1991, subject to any defect being repaired, the contractor's claim for payment of the retention money would become enforceable.

On 10 June 1991, a progress certificate was issued, certifying that the balance of the retention money amounted to a sum of R1,106,376.37, payable when a final certificate of completion was issued by the project's engineer within fourteen days of the expiration of the retention period. On 10 June, the contractor was placed in provisional liquidation and was finally wound up on 26 July. On 2 July, the engineer issued a final certificate of completion.

A dispute arose between the bank and the respondents in the present case, the joint liquidators of the contractor, as to who was entitled to payment of the balance of the retention money. The joint liquidators applied to the Natal Provincial Division for a declaratory order that, on a proper construction of the contract of cession, no security had been conferred on the bank in respect of retention money certified in terms of the contract for payment by the employer subsequent to 10 June 1991.

On 15 December 1993, the application was granted with costs against the bank. Relying on the authority of Muller v Trust Bank of Africa, the court held that the right to the retention money had not vested in the contractor at the time of the issue of the completion certificate, and that, at most, the contractor could be said to have had a mere spes or expectation of a right not yet in existence which was not capable of cession prior to the contractor's liquidation.

The bank appealed against the decision.

== Judgment ==
=== Issues ===
The Appellate Division held, agreeing with Joubert JA's analysis of the deed of cession as evidencing an intention to deal with future rights which the contractor might acquire, and not merely with rights extant at the time of conclusion of the cession agreement, that the questions to be determined were

1. whether the cession contemplated a transfer only of the contractor's then exigible debts and of future debts as and when they became exigible, or whether the parties to the document contemplated also a transfer of the contractor's claims then extant but imperfect because, for example, they were subject to some time clause or condition, and of similar imperfect claims as and when they arose in the future; and, if the latter
2. whether the contractor's claim against the employer was merely a future claim or such an imperfect one; and, if so,
3. whether present effective transfer was possible of such a claim, or whether future and contingent rights were equally incapable of present "delivery."

=== Findings ===
As to the first question, the court held that the inquiry had to be into what the parties to the cession had had in mind: what the contractor intended to deliver to the bank which was willing to finance, as far as necessary, the contractor's ongoing operation by means of overdraft facilities, and what the bank was content to accept as security for the recovery of the funds it was prepared to advance.

The court reasoned that it would make poor commercial sense for the bank to want no more than to ensure that the contractor channelled into the bank's possession money earned only as and when received as being exigible in reduction of the contractor's overdraft with the bank. In judging what was the content of the rights intended to be transferred and accepted as security, it was relevant that the sequence provided for in the contract, as in most engineering or building contracts, was that the contractor would perform first: it was only after the contractor had spent energy as well as money for the benefit of the employer, that performance—payment—by the employer enriched thereby became due in the sense of only then becoming exigible.

The personal rights intended to be transferred by the cession included rights to money owing, or which might become owing, to the contractor. The cession did not limit the rights to be transferred to the contractor's right to money then payable; or only as and when money became payable in future. The parties to the cession intended to extend the ambit of the rights of the contractor to be transferred to the bank as security as widely as lawfully possible.

As for the third question, the court found nothing in logic or law to militate against acceptance of the notion that an extant right may be transferred to another forthwith despite its being subject to a condition. It is accepted law that a contingent right is capable of immediate transfer. The fact that the right may in time turn out to be worth little, or less than the parties anticipated, does not detract from this proposition; the requirement that the object of a cession be certain did not mean that the money value of the ceded right had to be precisely calculable when the transfer of that right occurred. The dictum in Tuckers Land and Development v Strydom was applied by the court, and Muller v Trust Bank of Africa called into question.

As to the second question, since by 29 August 1990, the contractor had completed all work relating to the construction stage and had moved off the site, and since the work had been accepted by the employer, the contractor was owed what it had earned, subject only to the condition that it could forfeit a portion of that money if it did not maintain the work done for the period agreed upon, or if it did not remedy such minor defects as might become manifest during the period in question. The court held, accordingly, that the contractor had acquired before liquidation a personal right to performance by the employer of its part of their bargain: that performance (payment by the employer) was delayed for the maintenance period, and was subject to the condition that the amount held in the retention fund could be reduced. That right was transferred by cession to the bank before liquidation. (Joubert JA and Nestadt JA dissented from this finding.) The court held accordingly that the appeal should be upheld.

The court held further that the certificate of completion signified the coming into existence of a right to claim payment of the retention money subject to a suspensive condition, namely the repair of any defects which might manifest themselves during the retention period. It has been accepted in commerce and by the courts of South Africa for more than a century that future rights could be ceded and transferred in anticipando. Accordingly, the cession of 31 December 1984, was a valid one. If it incorporated a transfer in anticipando of the right in question (which only came into being at a later stage), it would have been legally effective.

The words of the deed, in particular the words "transfer and make over," and the reference to moneys and amounts becoming due and owing in future, indicated a present mutual intention of now transferring rights as they came into existence in the future. Accordingly, by virtue of the cession of 31 December 1984, the contractor's right to claim payment of the retention money when it came into being on 27 August 1990 (even though that right was subject to a suspensive condition), had been transferred to the bank. (Joubert JA and Nestadt JA dissented again.) The decision in the Natal Provincial Division, in Lynn v FNB, was thus reversed.

== See also ==
- South African contract law
