= S v Salzwedel =

South African legal case

S v Salzwedel and Others, an important case in South African criminal law and criminal procedure, was heard in the Supreme Court of Appeal (SCA) on 4 November 1999, with judgment handed down on 29 November. The judges were Mahomed CJ, Smalberger JA, Olivier JA, Melunsky AJA and Mpati AJA. GG Turner appeared for the appellant (the state); P. Myburgh, instructed by the Legal Aid Board, for the respondents, whose heads of argument were drawn up by JR Koekemoer.

The case dealt with factors to be taken into account in the imposition of sentences. Among the aggravating factors was racial motivation in the commission of a serious offence. This was found to subvert the fundamental premises of the ethos of human rights which now, after the negotiated settlement, permeated South Africa's processes of judicial interpretation and judicial discretion, including sentencing policy in punishment of criminal offences. A substantial term of imprisonment, for a murder committed out of racism, would give expression to the legitimate feelings of outrage experienced by all reasonable men and women in the community when the circumstances of the offence were disclosed and appreciated. It would also send a strong message to the country that the courts would not tolerate the commission of serious crimes perpetrated in consequence of racist and intolerant values inconsistent with the ethos of the Constitution, and that the courts would deal severely with offenders guilty of such conduct.

== Facts ==
The respondents had been convicted, inter alia, of murder in a Provincial Division. In sentencing them for a racially motivated crime, the court a quo had taken into account as a mitigating factor (among others) that they had been influenced by the racist conditioning of the environment in which they had grown up. Finding that direct imprisonment would serve no other purpose than retribution, the court a quo sentenced the respondents to an effective sentence of three years' correctional supervision.

The State appealed against this sentence.

== Judgment ==
On appeal, the SCA held that there came a time in the life of a nation when it had to and was able to identify practices such as racism as pathologies, and when it sought consciously and visibly and irreversibly to reject its shameful past. Substantially the same temper should inform the response of South Africa to serious crimes motivated by racism, at a time when the country had negotiated a new ethos and a clear repudiation of the racism which had for so long and so pervasively dominated so much of life and living in South Africa. The commission of serious offences perpetrated under the influence of racism subverted the fundamental premises of that ethos of human rights which now permeated the processes of judicial interpretation and judicial discretion, including sentencing policy in the punishment of criminal offences. The racial motive which had influenced the respondents to commit a serious crime had to be considered as an aggravating factor.

Imprisonment, the court found, would undoubtedly have been prejudicial to the respondents, but regard had to be had not only to the interests of the respondents, but also to the serious nature of the crime in the present case, its effect on others and the interests of the community at large. It could not properly have been said that a substantial term of imprisonment, in the circumstances of the present case, would have served no purpose other than retribution. It would also have given expression to the legitimate feelings of outrage which must have been experienced by reasonable men and women in the community when the circumstances of the offence had been disclosed and appreciated.

A lengthy term of imprisonment, sanctioned by the court, would also have served another important purpose. It would send a strong message to the country that the courts would not tolerate the commission of serious crimes in South Africa perpetrated in consequence of racist and intolerant values inconsistent with the ethos to which the Constitution committed the nation, and that the courts would deal severely with offenders guilty of such conduct.

The sentence imposed by the court a quo was accordingly set aside and replaced with an effective sentence of ten years' imprisonment.

== See also ==
- Murder
- Punishment
- Racism
- South African criminal law
