= Memory Institute SA v Hansen =

South African legal case

Memory Institute SA CC t/a SA Memory Institute v Hansen and Others is an important case in South African law, heard in the Supreme Court of Appeal. The judges were Harms JA, Schutz JA, Cameron JA, Conradie JA and Heher JA, who heard the case on May 8, 2003, handing down judgment on May 16, 2003. PJ Heymans appeared for the appellant; MH Wessels SC for the respondents.

The case revolved around the requirements for Anton Piller orders. Such orders, the court found, are for preservation of evidence; they are not a substitute for possessory or proprietary claims. They require built-in protection measures such as the appointment of an independent attorney to supervise their execution. The applicant and his own attorney may not form part of search party. The goods seized are to be kept in the possession of the sheriff pending the court's determination. Orders are not to be had simply for asking. Courts must satisfy themselves that a proper case has made out, more so if the subject-matter is of a technical nature.

The applicant alleged copyright infringement as basis for application for the Anton Piller order. The documents he was alleged to have copyright in were neither identified nor produced. That the applicant was the author of those documents, together with the originality of alleged works, was not proved to the satisfaction of the court. It was not alleged that there was a written assignment of copyright by the author to the applicant. It appeared that the allegations concerning possible infringement of copyright were purely speculative in their attempt to obtain the order.

== Facts ==
The appellant close corporation had, without notice, brought an urgent ex parte application seeking a rule nisi with interim effect against the first and second respondents. The order, referred to as an Anton Piller order by counsel, was granted by the High Court. The order provided for the removal of goods by the sheriff and the handing over of those goods to the appellant. The sheriff, together with a member of the appellant and the appellant's attorney, duly proceeded to the residence of the first and second respondents, and seized what they wanted.

The rule was later discharged by the court; the appellant appealed against this ruling. The first and second respondents had been party to a partnership agreement with the appellant, and wished to withdraw from this agreement. The appellant was prepared to buy them out, but insisted that they agree to a restraint-of-trade clause. The first and second respondents refused to do this. As the original contract had not contained a restraint-of-trade clause, the first and second respondents took steps to begin their own and similar business.

== Argument ==
On the issue of the seizure, the appellant argued that it was entitled to rely on rei vindicatio in relation to some of the items that had belonged to it. The problem faced by the appellant was that the first and second respondents were in possession of the goods in terms of an agreement with the appellant, which agreement had not been cancelled. The appellant further relied on copyright for the relief sought in the application. Counsel was, however, unable to refer to any prayer relating to or based on copyright infringement.

== Judgment ==
The court held that Anton Piller orders were for the preservation of evidence and were not a substitute for possessory or proprietary claims. They required built-in protection measures such as the appointment of an independent attorney to supervise the execution of the order. An applicant and his own attorney could not be part of the search party. The goods seized had to be kept in the possession of the sheriff pending the court's determination. Since it was the duty of the applicant to ensure that the order applied for did not go beyond that which was permitted, and since the Court had granted a rule nisi which it had not been empowered to grant, the setting aside of the rule had to follow as a matter of course.

The appellant had alleged that it held copyright in documents, but these documents had neither been identified nor produced. Whether the appellant was the author of the relevant documents, and the originality of the alleged works, was further not proved to the satisfaction of the Court. It was also not alleged that there had been written assignment of copyright by their author to the appellant.

It appeared to the court that the allegations concerning possible infringement of copyright in the founding affidavit had been purely speculative, a suspicion borne out by the results of the sheriff's search.

The court held, further, as to the reliance on unfair competition, that no trade secrets were alleged. It was impossible to perceive what wrong the appellant relied upon, unless it was lamenting the fact that the first and second respondents wished to compete with it at some time in the future, and that it could not prevent this because of the lack of restraint-of-trade and copyright protection.

Interim orders and rules nisi, the court held, were not to be had simply for the asking. Courts had to satisfy themselves that a proper case had been made out, more so if the subject was technical. The appeal, accordingly, was dismissed, and the decision in the Orange Free State Provincial Division, in Memory Institute SA CC t/a Memory Institute v Hansen and Others confirmed.
