= Informal admissions in South African law =

Informal admissions in South African law are part of the South African law of evidence. Briefly, an admission is a statement made by a party, in civil or criminal proceedings, which is adverse to that party's case. Informal admissions, which are usually made out of court, must be distinguished from formal admissions, made in the pleadings or in court. Formal admissions are binding on the maker, and are generally made in order to reduce the number of issues before the court; an informal admission is merely an item of evidence that can be contradicted or explained away.

Informal admissions may be admitted to prove the truth of their contents. The rationale for admitting such evidence would appear to be that a person is unlikely to make an admission adverse to his interests if the contents of that admission are not true. Since, however, a statement may constitute an admission even though a party is unaware that what he is saying is contrary to his interests,

[i]t is probably better to say that admissions or confessions do not have some of the drawbacks inherent in hearsay because a party can hardly complain that when he made the statement he was not on oath or did not have an opportunity to cross-examine himself.

Nevertheless, informal admissions in many instances will be hearsay in nature. Section 3(4) of the Law of Evidence Amendment Act defines hearsay evidence as “evidence, whether oral or in writing, the probative value of which depends upon the credibility of any person other than the person giving such evidence.” When the probative value of an informal admission depends primarily on its maker (which will almost invariably be the case), it will be a hearsay statement. As, however, section 3 of the Law of Evidence Amendment Act is “subject to the provisions of any other law,” existing statutory provisions will remain the primary route to admission, and the common law will remain “any other factor” to be taken into account by the court in the exercise of its discretion to admit hearsay in the interests of justice.

While Paizes also takes the view that section 3(4) brings confessions and admissions within the hearsay rule, and that the probative value of a statement depends on the credibility of its maker, he concludes that section 3 does not require any significant departure from the traditional approach to the admission of confessions and admissions, because

the more contentious aspects of the problem of the admissibility of confessions or admissions are not the concern of s 3. And, since it is difficult to imagine how the interest of justice could be served by the exclusion of a relevant, voluntarily made admission or confession which satisfies the other statutory requirements, it is submitted that subjecting such evidence to the scrutiny required in s 3 will be a harmless but usually futile exercise. The hearsay objection will be met, in any event, should the accused himself testify at his trial.

Once part of a statement has been allowed into evidence as an admission, the maker is entitled to have the whole statement put before the court, even where it includes self-serving statements, provided the two components form part of a single statement.

An informal admission, which is made extrajudicially, must also be distinguished from a statement made against a party's interest during the course of a trial. The latter is treated as ordinary evidence.

== Requirements for Admissibility ==
In civil matters, there is only one general requirement for admissibility: relevance. An additional requirement must be met where statements are made in the course of negotiations for the settlement of a dispute, in that such statements cannot be disclosed without the consent of both parties. In criminal matters, an admission must be proved to have been made voluntarily before it can be admitted into evidence.

== Admissions by conduct ==
Admissions may be contained in a verbal or written statement, and may also be inferred from conduct. For example, in S v Sheppard, it was held that a party's payment of an invoice was an admission that the services specified in that invoice had been performed. Conduct, however, does not need to be positive if it is to constitute an admission, and an admission may be inferred from silence. The constitutional right to remain silent, and the presumption of innocence, "will no doubt severely restrict the inferences that can be drawn from an accused's silence."

=== Admissions by silence ===
Silence in the face of an accusation may amount to an admission when it forms the basis of a commonsense inference against a party. For example, in Jacobs v Henning, the plaintiff, in bringing an action for damages for seduction, led evidence that the defendant, when confronted and accused by the plaintiff's father of having caused his daughter's pregnancy, remained silent and simply lowered his head. The court found that this conduct was sufficient corroboration of the plaintiff's version.

The nature of the inference that can be drawn from silence will always depend on the surrounding circumstances. In the past, one of the reasons for not readily drawing an inference from the accused's silence was the common-law right to remain silent and the presumption of innocence, which requires the prosecution to make out a prima facie case before there can be any obligation on the accused to speak. These rights now enjoy protection in the Constitution.

The right to remain silent may be described as the absence of a legal obligation to speak. Its rationale is three-fold:

1. concern for reliability (by deterring improper investigation), which relates directly to the truth-seeking function of the court;
2. a belief that individuals have a right to privacy and dignity, which, while not absolute, may not be lightly eroded; and
3. the necessity of giving effect to the privilege against self-incrimination and the presumption of innocence.

In the constitutional context, an issue that has been the subject both of national and of international debate is whether or not a negative inference may be drawn from an accused's election to exercise his right to remain silent. Although the issue of a negative inference will arise only at the trial stage, there are significant policy issues differentiating silence prior to trial from silence at trial.

At common law, the right to remain silent prohibited a court from drawing adverse inferences from silence at the investigative stage of the proceedings. If, however, an alibi defence is raised for the first time at trial, then the court, in determining whether the alibi is reasonably possibly true, may take into account, in terms of the common law, that there has been no opportunity for the state to investigate the alibi properly.

The constitutionality of the common-law approach to the late disclosure of an alibi was considered by the Constitutional Court in S v Thebus, where the court also applied its mind to the issue of the permissibility of drawing an adverse inference of guilt from pre-trial silence and the constitutionality of drawing an adverse inference as to the credibility of the accused from pre-trial silence.

These issues were raised on appeal by one of two co-accused, whose conviction on a charge of murder and two counts of attempted murder had been confirmed by the Supreme Court of Appeal. On arrest, the accused had been warned of his right to remain silent, but nevertheless elected to make an oral statement in which he described the whereabouts of his family at the time of the shooting. At trial, he testified that this statement had not been intended to include himself. (If it had been, it would have contradicted the details of his alibi defence.) After making this initial oral statement, the accused refused to make a written statement and only disclosed his alibi defence two years later, when the matter came to trial. The alibi defence was rejected by the trial court, and the accused was convicted. The accused's appeal to the Supreme Court of Appeal failed, and the matter then proceeded to the Constitutional Court, where the accused contended that the Supreme Court of Appeal had erred in drawing a negative inference from his failure to disclose his alibi defence timeously. Although there was concurrence on the ultimate fate of the appeal on this point, it attracted four separate judgments.

Moseneke J (Chaskalson CJ and MadalaJ concurring) emphasised the distinction between pre-trial silence and trial silence. In terms of this distinction, the objective of the right to silence during trial is to secure a fair trial, whereas "the protection of the right to pre-trial silence seeks to oust any compulsion to speak." Moseneke J then categorically stated that, "in our constitutional setting, pre-trial silence of an accused can never warrant the drawing of an inference of guilt," as this would undermine both the right to remain silent and the right to be presumed innocent. It is the ambiguity of pre-trial silence that prohibits an inference from silence being drawn. On Moseneke J's account, the drawing of an inference would render the mandatory warning of the right to remain silent "a trap instead of a means for finding out the truth in the interests of justice."

Moseneke J drew a distinction between an inference as to guilt and an inference pertaining to credibility on the basis of a person's pre-trial silence. The latter would not necessarily infringe on the presumption of innocence. "This distinction," argues PJ Schwikkard,

is somewhat tendentious. For example, with respect to the late disclosure of an alibi defence, a negative inference as to credibility will inevitably be a factor taken into consideration in the ultimate determination of guilt or innocence.

Moseneke J's judgment also supports a distinction between an inference as to guilt and the effect of late disclosure on the weight to be accorded the alibi evidence. The latter is simply treated as an unavoidable consequence of adversarial proceedings: Late disclosure precludes the prosecution from properly investigating the alibi defence. As a result, the alibi evidence will not be fully tested; less weight must be attached to it. The effect on weight is not the result of a negative inference as to credibility or guilt, but simply a product of the evaluation of evidence in the context of an adversarial system. As Schwikkard notes, however,

Moseneke J appears to equate this procedural consequence with an inference as to credibility and argues that drawing an inference as to credibility amounts to a compulsion to speak and consequently limits the accused’s right to silence.

Moseneke J further noted that it is constitutionally mandatory to warn accused of their right to remain silent, but that it is not mandatory that they be warned that their silence may possibly be used against them, and that their silence will be taken into account in determining the weight to be accorded an alibi. Taking into account the limited use of an inference based on the late disclosure of an alibi, he concluded that the common-law rule is a justifiable limitation of the right to remain silent, and that late disclosure of an alibi may have consequences which "can legitimately be taken into account in evaluating the evidence as a whole." Moseneke J acknowledged that “an election to disclose one’s defence only when one appears on trial is not only legitimate but also protected by the Constitution.” He then held, however, that this protection would not preclude cross-examination on the accused's election to remain silent, as such cross-examination would go to credit. Such cross-examination “would not unjustifiably limit the right to remain silent,” provided it was conducted with due regard to the dictates of trial fairness.

Goldstone and O’Regan JJ (Ackermann and Mokgoro JJ concurring) concurred in the result, but dissented insofar as they reached the conclusion that drawing an adverse inference from the first appellant's failure timeously to disclose his alibi was an unjustifiable infringement of the right to remain silent. In considering the rationale for prohibiting inferences from silence, they rejected the argument that it is unfair to place the accused in a position where he will suffer adverse consequences whatever his election, on the basis that hard choices were unavoidable in the adversarial process. They went no further, though, than suggesting that it is inevitable that there may be adverse consequences from exercising the right to remain silent. They avoided concluding that silence itself is an item of evidence.

Goldstone and O’Regan JJ also rejected the argument that drawing an adverse inference infringes the presumption of innocence because it relieves the state of part of its burden of proving guilt beyond a reasonable doubt. They argued that the Constitution “does not stipulate that only the state’s evidence may be used in determining whether the accused person has been proved guilty”. Taking the historical record of policing into account, however, they found that the prohibition on adverse inferences was justified insofar as it protected accused persons from improper police questioning and procedures. They held that this rationale does not extend to silence in court. They also endorsed the view that it is unfair to warn accused persons of their right to remain silent in a formulation that implies that there will be no penalty for silence, and then to permit a court to draw a negative inference from that silence. Although it is legitimate for an accused to be compelled to make a choice, that choice must be an informed choice: “An accused person needs to understand the consequences of remaining silent.” The warning also constitutes a barrier to drawing an adverse inference, in that, in many cases, it “will render the silence by the accused ambiguous.” Goldstone and O’Regan JJ rejected the distinction between adverse inferences going to guilt and those going to credit. Although they might be conceptually different, the two justices wrote, “the practical effect of the adverse inference to be drawn for the purposes of credit, namely, that the alibi evidence is not to be believed, will often be no different to the effect of the inference to be drawn with respect to guilt, namely that the late tender of the alibi suggests that it is manufactured and that the accused is guilty.” They also rejected Moseneke J's conclusion that it is constitutionally permissible to cross-examine accused on their election to remain silent:

1. An accused should not be required to explain why she chose to exercise a constitutional right.
2. It would be unfair in the light of the constitutionally mandated warning in respect of silence.

The two justices concluded, however, that, if the warning was revised, an adverse inference from the late disclosure of an alibi would constitute a justifiable limitation on the right to remain silent.

Yacoob J, although concurring in the result, took a somewhat different approach. He rejected the distinction between trial and pre-trial silence and held that section 35(1)(a) and section 35(3)(h) “represent a continuum.” He identified the purpose of the right to silence as being to “ensure that people are protected from self-incrimination in the process of police interrogation.” However, the ultimate objective of the right to remain silent, Yacoob J held, is to ensure a fair trial. Furthermore, he wrote that the right to a fair trial

is not limited to ensuring fairness for the accused. It is much broader. A court must also ensure that the trial is fair overall, and in that process, balance the interests of the accused with that of society at large and the administration of justice.

Because this broad concept of trial fairness cannot, presumably, be found in section 35(3), Yacoob J locates it in section 35(5). Section 35(5) confers a discretion on the courts to admit evidence even if it was unconstitutionally obtained, provided that it is fair to do so and its admission is not detrimental to the interests of justice. Consequently, Yacoob J held that, provided that the drawing of inferences from the exercise of the right to remain silent, or the interrogation of such exercise on cross-examination, does not ultimately render the trial unfair, there is no basis on which to forbid the drawing of such inferences. He reasoned as follows:

In the exercise of the duty to ensure a fair trial, it would become necessary to balance the rights of the accused, the rights of the victim and society at large. The right to silence of the accused could well become implicated in this balancing exercise when the judicial officer makes decisions concerning the admissibility of evidence, the allowing of cross-examination, as well as the drawing of inferences. Indeed inferences arising out of silence cannot ordinarily be drawn unless there is evidence of the silence of the accused and evidence of the circumstances surrounding the silence. Any investigation around the accused’s silence cannot be said to infringe his right to silence unless the trial is thereby rendered unfair. The same goes for all decisions concerning admissibility of evidence as well as the use of silence in the drawing of inferences. The fairness of the trial as an objective is fundamental and key. The right to silence can only be infringed if it is implicated in a way that renders the trial unfair. It is a contradiction in terms to suggest that the right to silence has been infringed if it is implicated in a way that does not compromise the fairness of the trial but enhances it.

"The reasoning in this passage," writes Schwikkard,

is difficult to sustain. First, s 35(5) only becomes applicable once it has been established that evidence has been unconstitutionally obtained. In respect of the right to remain silent, it first needs to be established whether the right to remain silent in s 35(1)(a) or s 35(3)(h) has been infringed. The right to remain silent attaches only to arrested and accused persons and does not embrace the rights of the victim and society at large. The broader notion of trial fairness may possibly be read into s 35(5) but is precluded at any earlier stage of the inquiry. Secondly, by conflating the right to silence and the right to a fair trial at all stages, Yacoob J implies that the only remedy for infringing the right to remain silent is the exclusion of evidence. An arrested person who is subjected to improper police questioning that infringes her right to remain silent must surely (at least theoretically) be able to seek relief for the infringement of this pre-trial right prior to going to trial. Undue emphasis on trial fairness may result in insufficient attention being given to the underlying relationship between the right to remain silent and the right to dignity.

Schwikkard finds, though, that "much is to be said for the contextual approach taken by Yacoob J in respect of the appropriate warning to be given to arrested persons." Yacoob J suggested that a more complex warning as to the consequences of remaining silent may well “tilt the balance in favour of getting [a] person to speak,” and that such a consequence may not necessarily be fairer than the constitutionally prescribed warning that “encourages silence on the part of an arrested person.” As a result, Yacoob J concluded that the more limited warning did not result in any unfairness to the appellant. Schwikkard suggests that

contextualising these particular constitutional rights might also lead to the conclusion that a more complex warning will make little difference to the fairness of the trial: it is very likely that neither warning will be properly understood. Therefore adverse inferences should not be permitted in these circumstances as silence in response to an incomprehensible warning would inevitably be too ambiguous to sustain an inference.

Schwikkard finds that, "given the divergent judgments, it is difficult to state, with any clarity what the law now is." Ten judges heard the case. Only two of them, "surprisingly," found that it was unnecessary to determine whether the failure to disclose an alibi defence to the police could attract an adverse inference. On the facts of the case, the appellant had not exercised his right to silence and, after being duly warned, had responded to a question concerning his whereabouts. "In effect," writes Schwikkard, "the court treated the matter as a previous inconsistent statement." Seven of the ten judges held that it was constitutionally impermissible to draw an adverse inference as to guilt from the accused's pre-trial silence. Four of the seven, however, indicated that, if the constitutionally-mandated warning was rephrased so as to apprise arrested persons of the consequences of remaining silent, an adverse inference for pre-trial silence might be constitutionally justifiable. Three other judges held that, although an adverse inference as to guilt was not justifiable, an adverse inference as to credibility was a justifiable limitation on the right to remain silent, and that it was permissible to cross-examine the accused on his failure to disclose an alibi timeously. Four justices expressly rejected this conclusion. All eight of the judges dealing with the question of adverse inferences would appear to have concurred with the view that there may well be acceptable negative consequences which attach to remaining silent:

It would seem, therefore, that the common-law position remains largely intact and that it is constitutionally permissible to take the late disclosure of an alibi into account in determining what weight should be attached to the alibi defence.

As to the drawing of inferences from pre-trial silence, Moseneke J makes it clear that negative inferences are constitutionally impermissible. On the other hand, the concurring judgment of Goldstone and O’Regan JJ suggests that such inferences might be constitutional if arrested persons are warned of the consequences of their silence. One conclusion that would be consistent with both judgments, and which is suggested by Schwikkard,

is that the ambiguity of silence (and the impermissibility of drawing any inference) would remain if an arrested person did not understand the revised warning. Such a restatement of the law would make it highly unlikely that a negative inference could ever be drawn from silence at any stage where an arrested person or accused person is not represented by counsel.

The position on inferences to be made from trial silence "likewise remains unclear." At common law, the prosecution could refer to the accused's silence once a prima facie case had been established. Clear authority exists for the proposition that, in certain circumstances, an accused's refusal to testify, when the prosecution had established a prima facie case, could be a factor in assessing guilt. The Constitutional Court has not expressly ruled on whether drawing an adverse inference from silence at trial would pass constitutional muster, but it has on more than one occasion pronounced that trial silence may have such untoward consequences. In Thebus, the court wrote that

if there is evidence that requires a response and if no response is forthcoming [...] the Court may be justified in concluding that the evidence is sufficient, in the absence of an explanation, to prove the guilt of the accused.

The precise nature of the negative consequences of remaining silent at trial is "not altogether clear." Schwikkard believes there to be two options:

(a) an adverse inference as to credibility or guilt; (b) a conclusion that in the absence of contradictory evidence the evidence is sufficient to convict. In (a) silence becomes an item of evidence whereas in (b) the negative consequence is simply an unavoidable possibility in the final evaluation of evidence. The problem with (a) is that to use silence as an item of evidence against the accused may well infringe the right to remain silent.

To date the Constitutional Court has avoided pronouncing upon the constitutionality of using trial silence as an item of evidence. However, the language employed by Ponnan JA in S v Monyane would suggest that the Supreme Court of Appeal is prepared to expand the ambit of negative consequences to include using silence as an item of evidence. This is suggested in the following passage:

[S]omewhat surprisingly, the fourth appellant did not testify. The presence of his vehicle and the evidence of the second appellant linked him to the crime scene. In those circumstances, a reasonable expectation existed that, if there were an explanation consistent with his innocence, it would have been proffered. He, however refused to rise to the challenge. For him to have remained silent in the face of the evidence was nothing short of damning.

It appears to Schwikkard that, in the circumstances of the case, there was sufficient evidence to establish guilt beyond reasonable doubt without using silence as evidence. He finds

[a]nother difficulty that arises with drawing inferences from trial silence [...]: what is the inference to be drawn if the accused remains silent on the advice of counsel? In these circumstances it would very difficult for any court to conclude that an inference to credibility or guilt was the only reasonable inference—the consequence outlined in (b) above would not necessarily be precluded.

This issue was "skirted," Schwikkard believes, by the Supreme Court of Appeal in S v Tandwa, in which the first accused alleged that his right to a fair trial had been compromised as a result of incompetent legal representation. The basis of this complainant was that counsel had advised him not to testify. The court, taking a similar approach to that in Monyane, held that silence could, depending on the circumstances, give rise to an inference of guilt: that is to say, could be used as an item of evidence against the accused in establishing guilt beyond reasonable doubt; indeed it was such an inference that led to the accused's conviction. The court did not explain how it discounted the undisputed fact that the accused remained silent on counsel's advice. "That being so," writes Schwikkard, "it is difficult to understand how an inference as to guilt could be the only reasonable inference in the circumstances."

== See also ==
- Law of South Africa
- South African civil procedure
- South African criminal procedure
- South African law of evidence
