= S v Thebus =

South African legal case

- Court: Constitutional Court of South Africa
- Full case name: Abduraghman Thebus and Another v the State
- Decided: 28 August 2003
- Citations: [2003] ZACC 12; 2003 (6) SA 505 (CC); 2003 (10) BCLR 1100 (CC)

Case history
- Prior actions: Supreme Court of Appeal – S v Thebus [2002] ZASCA 89; High Court of South Africa, Cape Division – S v Thebus (SS77/2000, unreported)

Court membership
- Judges sitting: Chaskalson CJ, Langa DCJ, Ackermann, Goldstone, Madala, Mokgoro, Moseneke, O'Regan and Yacoob JJ

Case opinions
- The doctrine of common purpose is compatible with the Constitution. (Unanimous.) It is permissible to draw an adverse inference from an accused person's failure to disclose an alibi timeously. (4:4.)
- Decision by: Moseneke J (Chaskalson and Madala concurring)
- Concur/dissent: Goldstone and O'Regan JJ (Ackermann and Mokgoro concurring); Yacoob J; Ngcobo J (Langa concurring)

S v Thebus and Another is a 2003 decision of the Constitutional Court of South Africa in the area of criminal law and criminal procedure. The court unanimously affirmed that the doctrine of common purpose was compatible with the Constitution, upholding two murder convictions on that basis. However, the court was also called to determine whether it is compatible with the constitutional right to silence for courts to draw an adverse inference from a criminal defendant's failure to disclose an alibi before trial. On that further question, the court was divided.

== Background ==
The case emanated from a gunfight in Ocean View, a township in Cape Town, on 14 November 1998. Earlier that day, a group of residents, described variously as a vigilante or as protestors, had driven in a motorcade through the township; they allegedly attacked the houses of several individuals whom they suspected of drug dealing, including Grant Cronje. Encountering the motorcade at an intersection, Cronje opened fire on the group, some of whom returned fire. A seven-year-old girl was killed in the crossfire and two others were wounded.

In the aftermath, Abduraghman Thebus and Moegamat Adams were arrested on suspicion of having been part of the group involved in the shooting. Although there was no evidence that either man had fired a shot, the state led evidence placing both defendants in the vicinity of the shooting, leading the Cape High Court to conclude that both had been members of the group of protestors and that both had been present at the scene of the shooting. On this basis, on 14 September 2000, the High Court applied the doctrine of common purpose to find them guilty of one count of murder and two counts of attempted murder apiece. They were sentenced to eight years' imprisonment, suspended for five years.

The state applied for leave to appeal the defendants' sentences, seeking stricter sentences, and the defendants applied to appeal their convictions. On 30 August 2002, the Supreme Court of Appeal dismissed the appeal against the convictions but upheld the state's appeal against the sentences; in a judgment written by Acting Judge of Appeal Carole Lewis, the majority of the court ordered that each defendant should be sentenced to 15 years' imprisonment. Thebus and Adams were subsequently granted special leave to appeal to the Constitutional Court of South Africa, which, on 20 February 2003, heard argument on two constitutional questions arising from the case.

== Argument ==
Represented by Jeremy Gauntlett, the defendants launched two constitutional attacks on their convictions. The first was a broad challenge to the doctrine of common purpose as found at common law. That doctrine, as refined in S v Mgedezi, allows individuals to be held liable for any criminal conduct committed in terms of a joint criminal enterprise with which they are associated. The defendants contended that the doctrine is inconsistent with the constitutional rights to dignity, freedom of the person, and a fair trial. Therefore, they held that the Supreme Court of Appeal had been obliged, in terms of section 39(2) of the Constitution, to develop the doctrine of common purpose in order to bring it into compliance with the Bill of Rights. Section 39(2) provides that, "When interpreting any legislation, and when developing the common law or customary law, every court, tribunal or forum must promote the spirit, purport and objects of the Bill of Rights."

The second constitutional issue pertained only to Thebus's conviction. During the trial, Thebus had relied on an alibi defence, calling two witnesses to testify in support of his alibi. However, he had not disclosed his alibi upon his arrest – including during a brief conversation with a police sergeant – nor at any point during the two years in which he was awaiting trial. Both lower courts rejected Thebus's alibi, preferring the evidence of the witness who placed him at the scene of the shooting in Ocean View. The Supreme Court of Appeal, in particular, explicitly drew an adverse inference from his failure to advise the police of his alibi, concluding that this proved his alibi to be false. In argument before the Constitutional Court, Thebus argued that this inference violated his right to silence, as guaranteed in section 35(1)(a) of the Constitution.

== Judgments ==
Handing down judgment on 28 August 2003, the Constitutional Court dismissed the defendants' appeal, upholding their convictions. Justice Dikgang Moseneke wrote the leading judgment, in which Chief Justice Arthur Chaskalson and Justice Tholie Madala concurred. Three other judgments were filed.

=== Common purpose ===
On the first constitutional question, the court concurred unanimously in Moseneke's judgment. After discussing the proper application of section 39(2) of the Constitution and the circumstances in which it compels a court to develop or adapt the common law, Moseneke rejected the defendants' rights-based arguments. He held that the doctrine of common purpose, as applied in the present case, passes constitutional muster and therefore does not trigger any judicial obligation under section 39(2).

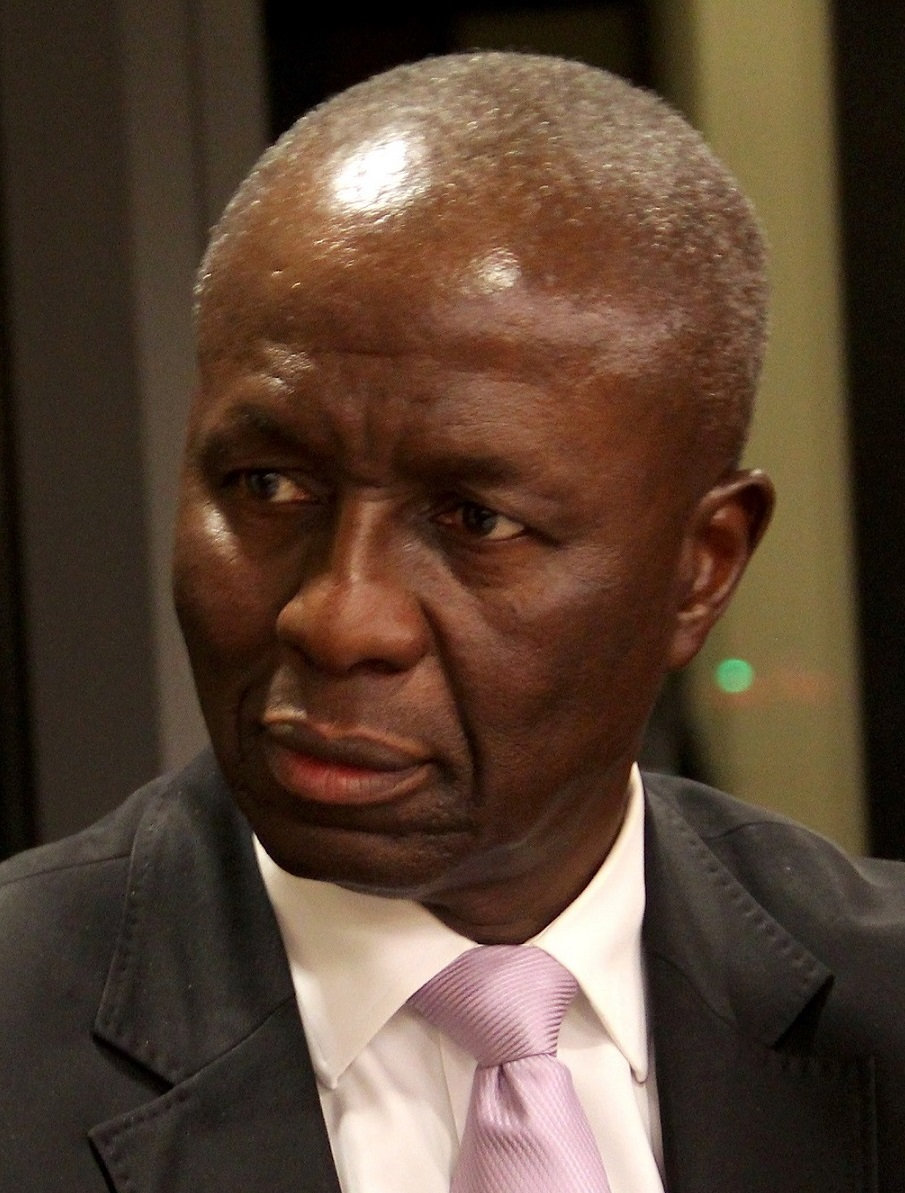
Justice Dikgang Moseneke's judgment on the common purpose doctrine was endorsed unanimously.

=== Adverse inference ===
On the second constitutional question, the court was divided; each of the four judgments provided a different approach to the constitutionality of drawing adverse inferences from the late disclosure of an alibi. However, each also agreed that, the constitutional question notwithstanding, Thebus's guilt had been proved beyond a reasonable doubt and the trial court had therefore been entitled to convict him. The court therefore unanimously endorsed the order set out in Moseneke's judgment.

Moseneke's leading judgment answered the second constitutional question by distinguishing between adverse inferences as to guilt and adverse inferences as to credibility. It upheld the principle that an accused person's pre-trial silence can never warrant an inference of guilt; to permit such inferences would undermine the right to remain silent and the right to be presumed innocent. On the other hand, if an accused person opts to remain silent instead of disclosing an alibi timeously, this may legitimately be taken into account in evaluating the evidence, and it may legitimately lead a court to place less weight on the evidence supporting the alibi. This principle limits the constitutional right to remain silent, but the limitation is justifiable under section 36 of the Constitution. In particular, the limitation is not severe: the late disclosure of an alibi does not alone justify an inference of guilt, and it is only one of several factors that a court takes into account when evaluating an alibi. Among other things, the court will have regard "to the factual matrix within which the right to silence was exercised"; indeed, in this connection, it is permissible for courts to cross-examine accused persons about their reasons for having chosen to remain silent instead of disclosing their alibi. Nonetheless, Moseneke agreed with the defendants that the Supreme Court of Appeal had placed undue weight on the late disclosure of Thebus's alibi: the court had, "in effect, imputed guilt from pre-trial silence and thus trenched his constitutional guarantee to remain silent before his trial". This was impermissible, but it did not materially alter the outcome of the trial.

A second judgment was tendered by Justice Zak Yacoob, who agreed with the plurality judgment that it is not necessarily unconstitutional to draw an adverse inference from the late disclosure of an alibi. However, his reasoning differed substantially from Moseneke's and was instead grounded in section 35(3) of the Constitution, which guarantees – in detailed terms – the right to a fair trial. For Yacoob, the ultimate obligation of a judicial officer in any criminal trial is to ensure a fair trial under section 35(3), and that imperative is dispositive in deciding whether an accused or arrested person's rights have been infringed in any case. To draw an adverse inference from the accused's silence alone would render a trial unfair. However, courts are permitted to draw adverse inferences from the delayed disclosure of an alibi, in conjunction with any explanation for the delay given by the accused under cross-examination, "provided that the way in which the inference is made and the drawing of the inference itself does not render the trial unfair". In Thebus's case, the inference drawn by the Supreme Court of Appeal was "entirely fair".

The plurality judgment on the question was written by Justice Richard Goldstone and Kate O'Regan and joined by Justices Laurie Ackermann and Yvonne Mokgoro. Unlike Moseneke, Goldstone and O'Regan did not acknowledge a valid distinction, in practice and as applied to alibi evidence, between an adverse inference as to guilt and an adverse inference as to credibility. In cases such as Thebus's, the crucial component of the right to silence was "the specific immunity of an accused from having an adverse inference drawn from his or her silence", and that right was clearly breached by the lower courts' adverse inference. It may be constitutionally permissible for adverse inference to be drawn, but only if the accused person is warned that their silence may license adverse inferences. Section 35(1)(b) mandates that arrested persons must be warned of their right to silence (akin to the Miranda warning), but, in its current formulation, it provides accused persons with the impression that the right to silence is "without qualification" and without penalty. In those circumstances, it is unfair to draw an adverse inference from an accused person's silence. Goldstone and O'Regan also disagreed with Moseneke's finding that it is permissible to cross-examine an accused person about why they opted to exercise their right to silence.

The final judgment was written by Justice Sandile Ngcobo and joined by Deputy Chief Justice Pius Langa. Ngcobo held that the court need not reach the adverse inference question because, on the facts, Thebus's right to silence was not implicated. In supporting this conclusion, Ngcobo returned to the account of the police sergeant present at Thebus's arrest. After informing Thebus of his right to remain silent and the risk of self-incrimination, the sergeant informed him that witnesses had placed him at the scene of the crime. To this inquiry, Thebus had not only failed to disclose his alibi; he had not exercised his right to silence, and instead had replied with an exculpatory statement to the effect that his family was in Hanover Park at the time of the crime. This was patently inconsistent with his later alibi defence – that he had been at Parkwood Estate with his second wife – and, when Thebus was later questioned about the inconsistency, his explanation had been "disingenuous" and unpersuasive. In other words, the obstacle to Thebus's defence was not his silence – because he had not remained silent – but the inconsistency of what he had said. The lingering consistency provided proper grounds for drawing an adverse inference on credibility, though Ngcobo agreed with the majority that the Supreme Court of Appeal had erred insofar as it had inferred guilt from Thebus's non-disclosure of his alibi.

== Significance ==
During the 2003 term, Thebus was one of only two Constitutional Court judgments that were not unanimous, the other being Phillips v Director of Public Prosecutions. In addition to the case's significance in criminal procedure, Moseneke's judgment is often cited in connection with the section 39(2) obligation to develop the common law, as well as in connection with the common purpose doctrine.

== See also ==
- Informal admissions in South African law
- Tshabalala v S; Ntuli v S
