= Pierre Olivier =

South African judge (1936–2003)

Judge of the Supreme Court of Appeal
- In office 1 April 1995 – 16 December 2003
- Appointed by: Nelson Mandela

Judge of the Supreme Court
- In office 1985 – 31 March 1995
- Appointed by: P. W. Botha
- Division: Orange Free State

Personal details
- Born: 1936 Usakos, South West Africa
- Died: 16 December 2003 (aged 67) Bloemfontein, Free State; Republic of South Africa
- Citizenship: South Africa
- Education: Paul Roos Gymnasium
- Alma mater: University of Pretoria

Pierre J. J. Olivier (1936 – 16 December 2003) was a South African jurist and judge who served in the Supreme Court of Appeal from 1995 until his death in 2003. He was an advocate and silk in Bloemfontein until he was appointed to the bench in 1985 as a judge of the Orange Free State Provincial Division of the Supreme Court of South Africa. Before entering legal practice, he taught law at the University of Pretoria from 1961 to 1969 and at the University of the Orange Free State from 1969 to 1973; he specialised in private law.

== Early life and education ==
Olivier was born in Usakos, Namibia in 1936. He matriculated at Paul Roos Gymnasium in Stellenbosch, South Africa, and attended the University of Pretoria from 1957 to 1960, completing an LLB and a BA in law.

== Legal and academic career ==
While a law student, Olivier clerked at a local firm in Pretoria, and he was admitted as an advocate in 1961. However, after his graduation, he entered legal academia, first as a lecturer in Roman-Dutch law at the University of Pretoria from 1961, then as a professor of law at the same university from 1965, and finally as a professor of private law at the University of the Orange Free State from 1969.

On 15 December 1973, Olivier left academia to join the bar. He practised as an advocate in Bloemfontein, taking silk on 19 November 1981. In addition to local courts, he frequently appeared in courts in Windhoek and Lesotho. He also continued to publish, authoring the first Afrikaans-language textbook on family law and the law of persons. On 30 September 1982, he was appointed to the South African Law Reform Commission, based in Pretoria.

== Free State Division: 1985–1995 ==
In late 1985, Olivier was appointed as a judge of the Orange Free State Provincial Division of the Supreme Court of South Africa. Soon afterwards, in 1986, he was seconded full-time to the Pretoria offices of the South African Law Reform Commission; he was a full-time member until 1 December 1988, when he began his lengthy as vice-chairperson of the commission (initially deputising judge H. J. O. van Heerden). His tenure coincided with the post-apartheid transition, and Olivier became a central figure in debates about a post-apartheid constitution and bill of rights. In particular, he led the Law Reform Commission project that drafted an authoritative 1989 working paper on group rights and human rights; among other things, the paper proposed a South African bill of rights based on individual rights rather than on group rights.

During this period, in October 1994, he was an unsuccessful candidate for appointment to the new Constitutional Court of South Africa.

== Appellate Division: 1995–2003 ==
In December 1994, the Judicial Service Commission interviewed Olivier as a candidate for one of three vacancies in the Supreme Court's Appellate Division. His candidacy was met with objections from gender advocacy groups, who argued that Olivier had handed lenient sentences to rapists. Cathi Albertyn of Witwatersrand University wrote in an open letter to the commission that Olivier's judgements in rape cases "appear to suggest that the judge does not believe that rape in itself is a serious offence, [and] they appear to reinforce and perpetuate within the law many of the myths and stereotypes that surround rape and that have resulted in the unfair treatment of women as complainants in rape trials".

Nonetheless, Olivier was appointed as an acting judge in the court's Appellate Division on 15 December 1994, and he joined the Appellate Division permanently with effect from 1 April 1995, alongside judges Robin Marais and Peter Schutz. He remained in the appellate court after it was reconfigured as the Supreme Court of Appeal, and he served until his death in 2003. During that time, he was also extraordinary professor in the law of evidence and procedure at the University of Pretoria. At the same time, he gained reappointment to the first post-apartheid Law Reform Commission (under chairperson Ismail Mahomed) in 1996, and he remained in the vice-chairmanship until the end of 1998, when he was succeeded by Yvonne Mokgoro.

== Personal life and death ==
He was married to Helene Olivier (née De Beer), a writer and children's books publisher, with whom he had four sons. He died on 16 December 2003 at Rosepark Hospital in Bloemfontein, aged 67; he had been ill with cancer for some time and was hospitalised for three weeks prior.
