= Tshabalala v S; Ntuli v S =

South African legal case

- Court: Constitutional Court of South Africa
- Full case name: Tshabalala v S; Ntuli v S
- Decided: 11 December 2019
- Docket nos.: CCT323/18;CCT69/19
- Citations: [2019] ZACC 48; 2020 (3) BCLR 307 (CC); 2020 (2) SACR 38 (CC); 2020 (5) SA 1 (CC)

Case history
- Appealed from: High Court of South Africa, Witwatersrand Local Division

Court membership
- Judges sitting: Mogoeng CJ, Froneman J, Jafta J, Khampepe J, Madlanga J, Mathopo AJ, Mhlantla J, Theron J, Victor AJ

Case opinions
- The doctrine of common purpose is applicable to the common law crime of rape.
- Decision by: Mathopo AJ (unanimous)
- Concurrence: Khampepe J (Froneman, Jafta, Madlanga, Mathopo, Mhlantla, Theron, and Victor concurring)
- Concurrence: Victor AJ

Keywords
- Common law rape; doctrine of common purpose; instrumentality

Tshabalala v S; Ntuli v S is a decision of the Constitutional Court of South Africa which established that the doctrine of common purpose is applicable to the common law crime of rape. It was heard on 22 August 2019 and decided on 11 December 2019. In a unanimous decision written by Acting Justice Rammaka Mathopo, the court dismissed the appeal of applicants, who were convicted of rape in a gang rape situation without having entered into sexual contact with the victims. The court rejected the argument that the crime of rape requires the instrumentality of one's own body, finding that the purpose of the common purpose doctrine is to penalise crime committed in joint enterprises.

== Background ==
On 20 September 1998, a group of young men raped eight women in the Umthambeka section of the township of Tembisa in Gauteng. Members of the group were brought to trial in the High Court of South Africa on 13 August 1999 and were convicted of various charges, including seven counts of common law rape. Seven of the eight rape counts were imposed on the basis of the doctrine of common purpose: although some of the defendants had not penetrated the raped women, but had instead stood as look-outs, the High Court found that defendants had entered into a common purpose to commit the rape and that the rapes were executed pursuant to a prior agreement in furtherance of that purpose. Two of the defendants, Mr Abulane Alpheus Tshabalala and Mr Annanius Ntuli, sought leave to appeal their convictions and sentences in the Constitutional Court.

The Constitutional Court found jurisdiction in the case because of an existing uncertainty in South African criminal law about the proper application of the common purpose doctrine to the crime of common law rape. Although the doctrine of common purpose passed constitutional muster in S v Thebus, it was generally applied to convictions of crimes of consequence such as murder, assault, and robbery. Courts had been hesitant to apply the doctrine to co-accused in rape cases, especially in cases of gang rape.

== Arguments ==
The applicants contended that the doctrine of common purpose does not apply to common law rape because the common law crime of rape requires unlawful sexual penetration, and the instrumentality of one's body is therefore required for the commission of the crime of rape (the so-called "instrumentality argument").

The respondent submitted that physical instrumentality is not required for the commission of rape in cases where the accused have entered into a prior agreement, because the conduct of each accused in the execution of that purpose is rightfully imputed to the other. Two amici curiae, the Commission for Gender Equality and Centre for Applied Legal Studies, made submissions in support of the trial court's order.

== Judgment ==
Acting Justice Rammaka Mathopo wrote on behalf of a unanimous court that the instrumentality argument is flawed. The use of one's body in the commission of a crime is no more determinative in cases of rape than in cases of murder and assault. The main object of the common purpose doctrine, in cases of rape as in other cases, is to obstruct and penalise crime committed in the course of joint enterprises, and the causal prerequisite in the crime of common law rape was ineffectual to that object. Accepting the High Court's circumstantial evidence of a premeditated agreement between the group of men in the trial, the main judgment held that the applicants knowingly and intentionally associated themselves with the criminal purpose of the group and could therefore be regarded as co-perpetrators of the rape. Tshabalala and Ntuli's appeals were dismissed.

In a separate opinion, joined by seven justices, Justice Sisi Khampepe expanded on the nature of rape as a systemic crime of power rather than a deviant sexual crime. Acting Justice Margaret Victor filed a third opinion on the influence of feminist legal theory and international law on the development of South African common law with respect to sexual offences.

== Reactions ==
The decision was generally commended as progressive.
