= S v Naidoo =

In S v Naidoo 2003 (1) SACR 347 (SCA); [2002] 4 All SA 710 (SCA), an important case in South African criminal procedure, the appellant had been convicted, along with two other accused, on 13 counts of culpable homicide arising out of an incident where a teargas canister was thrown into a rival nightclub. In the ensuing chaos and stampede 13 of the patrons of the nightclub died.

Just as in the case of murder it is immaterial whether multiple killings were the result of one act (such as throwing a grenade) and as many counts of murder as the number of people who have been killed may be preferred, so too in the case of culpable homicide where multiple deaths have been caused is it immaterial that they were caused by a single negligent act or omission provided only that multiple deaths were a reasonably foreseeable consequence.

It is the foreseeable and actual consequences of the accused's negligent act which determine whether she or he is liable to be charged with one or more counts of culpable homicide.

The punishable act is by definition the unlawful negligent killing of a human being. The unlawful negligent killing of more than one human being gives rise to more than one punishable act irrespective of whether the negligent act which caused death was a series of different acts or the same single act.

There should be no difference (subject of course to jurisdictional sentencing limitations) in the sentence imposed whether multiple deaths have been the subject of separate counts or combined in one count of culpable homicide. Whether multiple deaths are the subject of a single count or a number of separate counts, the totality of the sentence to be imposed will depend upon the personal circumstances of the accused, the degree of culpability present in both his or her conduct and in the failure to foresee the reasonably possible consequences of that conduct, and the actual consequences of that conduct.

The Court dismissed the appellant's contention that he should have been convicted on only one count of culpable homicide and not on multiple counts.
