= S v D =

In S v D, an important case in South African criminal law, the appellant had attempted to rape an eleven-year-old girl. He was a 44-year-old first offender. The complainant had not suffered physical injuries; there was no evidence of psychological damage. The sentence was altered on appeal to three years' imprisonment, half suspended.

== See also ==
- South African criminal law
