= S v Suliman =

In S v Suliman 1969 (2) SA 385 (A), an important case in South African criminal procedure, the court held that the full Court of a Provincial Division of the Supreme Court has no power, either under the authority of the Supreme Court Act, or by reason of any practice or any reason of any inherent jurisdiction, to intervene in any criminal case which is being heard by a Judge sitting in the Supreme Court or the Local Division, or which has already been disposed of by a Judge sitting in such Court or Local Division.
