= Peter Schutz (judge) =

South African judge

The Honourable Peter Schutz

Personal details
- Born: 1932; Carnarvon, Cape Province; Union of South Africa
- Died: August 2004 (age 71); Johannesburg, Gauteng; Republic of South Africa

W. Peter Schutz (1932–2004) was a South African judge who served in the Supreme Court of Appeal between 1995 and 2004. Formerly a practising advocate, he joined the judiciary in 1991 as a judge of the Transvaal Provincial Division.

== Life and career ==
Schutz was born in 1932 in Carnarvon in the Northern Cape (then the Cape Province). He joined the bar in February 1956 and took silk in June 1976. He took office as a judge of the Transvaal Provincial Division of the Supreme Court of South Africa on 1 January 1991, and he was elevated to the Appellate Division with effect from 1 April 1995. He remained in the appellate court after it was reconfigured as the Supreme Court of Appeal, and he served until his death in August 2004.

His notable judgments included Minister of Environmental Affairs and Tourism v Phambili Fisheries, which was reviewed in the Constitutional Court as Bato Star Fishing v Minister of Environmental Affairs and Tourism.
