= S v Tandwa =

South African legal case

In S v Tandwa, the seven appellants were convicted of a bank robbery and appealed this. The allegation was that it was an "inside job," as Tandwa was an employee of the bank. It looked like Tandwa was a victim, but he was actually working with the bank robbers.

The first appellant also contended that his right to a fair trial had been violated in that his counsel had been incompetent, had given him bad advice, and had conducted himself obstructively. In particular, he claimed that he had not been properly informed about the consequences of not testifying, and that his counsel had misled him on the legal position in this regard.

The court held that the right to legal representation meant a right to representation that was competent and of a quality and nature that ensured that the trial was indeed fair.

It also followed that an accused had the right to represent himself, and if the unwanted or inept advice of counsel unfairly thwarted the exercise of that right, the accused's right to a fair trial would have been infringed.

The court held that the evidence in favour of the State was very strong and the accused's allegations were so weak, contradictory and inherently improbable that they could be rejected on affidavit without further enquiry.

Furthermore, it was held that it was inherently improbable that a well-educated accused with experience of testifying in previous proceedings would not either insist on testifying, as previously agreed, or complain at the first opportunity about having been unjustly thwarted in his wish to do so

Therefore, the appeals were dismissed.
