= Toich v Magistrate, Riversdale =

South African legal case

In Toich v Magistrate, Riversdale (2007), an important case in South African criminal procedure, Toich's home was searched on two occasions by the police, who were purportedly acting in terms of valid search warrants. Various items and sums of cash were seized.

Toich sought an order for the return of the property seized under both warrants, and for the setting aside of the second warrant.

The court held that the first warrant authorized a search of a certain farm, and not of the applicant's house, which was on an entirely different property. Accordingly, the search of her house had been unauthorized and unlawful, as had been the seizure of her property. Moreover, hardly any of the property seized had been specified in the warrant. In consequence, the applicant was entitled to the return of all the seized items.

Regarding the second warrant, the court found that the police officer had applied to the magistrate for a warrant on the grounds:

- that the Asset Forfeiture Unit had ordered the seizure of certain cash known or suspected to be in the applicant's possession;
- that the possibility existed that cash had been generated from the commission of crimes; and
- that, despite an undertaking to do so, the applicant had failed to account to the police for the source of the money.

The court held that it was clear that the only document relied upon by the police officer in her application for the warrant was her own undated and unattested "affidavit." Given that there had been no viva voce evidence, and given that the "affidavit" had not been attested, there had been no information of any kind placed before the magistrate on oath; he had had no power, therefore, under section 21(1)(a) of the CPA, to authorize the issue of the second warrant; it was accordingly invalid.

Furthermore, the court found that the authorities were clear that the validity of a search warrant was to be examined with a jealous regard for the subject's rights to privacy and property.

In addition, the magistrate or justice of the peace, in authorizing the warrant, must be satisfied by information on oath only that the article to be searched for and seized was under the control or in the possession of a specified person, or was at a specified premises within his or her jurisdiction.

The terms of the warrant were to be construed with reasonable strictness. It should ordinarily be read in the terms in which it was expressed.

There must be reasonable grounds, therefore, for believing that the article sought might afford evidence of an offense, but in the instant case the court held that no such grounds had been advanced to the magistrate. He could consequently not have harbored such a belief.

It followed that he had not properly applied his mind when issuing the warrant, and that it was invalid.
