= S v Chabedi =

South African legal case

In S v Chabedi, during a criminal trial Chabedi's attorney had allegedly failed to consult properly with Chabedi, and had failed to recall certain state witnesses, when it became apparent that they could answer questions relating to material issues.

On appeal, the court raised the question of whether the appellant had received a fair trial.

The court held that it was the duty of the attorney, in the proper performance of his mandate to defend the appellant, to have recalled the witnesses in order to do justice to his client's defense.

The attorney's failure to do so brought into question his competency to conduct the appellant's defense.

Accepting that the appellant had not been defended properly, the question was whether it had amounted to a fatal irregularity which vitiated the proceedings.

The court held the right of an accused person to be properly defended is inextricably linked to the accused's rights to a fair trial and to legal representation.

The court held that the attorney clearly failed to appreciate the import of the evidence and the effect it might have had on the complainant's version and other evidence.

Therefore the conviction was set aside and the matter remitted to another magistrate.

In view of the findings made regarding the competency of the attorney who conducted his defence at the trial, the interests of justice required that another legal representative be appointed to represent the appellant at the further trial.

== Notes ==
- S v Chabedi 2004 (1) SACR 477 (W)
- Annual Survey of South African Law 2004, p 693
