= Nel v Deputy Commissioner of Police, Grahamstown =

South African legal case

In Nel v Deputy Commissioner of Police, Grahamstown 1953 (1) SA 487 (E), an important case in South African criminal procedure, Nel was the owner of an amusement park in East London which was open to the public. A head constable and sub-inspector entered this park and came to the conclusion that five machines were gambling instruments. Nel knew that both were police officers. He invited them to inspect and operate the machines, and even offered to open them up and show how they worked; he was quite co-operative.

After searching or inspecting the machines, and even playing on at least some of them, the officers came to the conclusion that five of the machines were illegal. They determined to seize and remove them.

Nel argued that he had consented only to a search; he had not consented to a seizure.

The court held that, when a police official above the rank of sergeant has reasonable grounds for believing that a search without a warrant is necessary, the consent to the search by the person suspected does not deprive that official of his right to seize incriminating articles, any more than consent could prevent the official, armed with a search warrant from seizing the articles.

One cannot remove consent, therefore, at the seizure stage.

== Notes ==
- Nel v Deputy Commissioner of Police, Grahamstown 1953 (1) SA 487 (E)
