= Minister of Safety & Security v Xaba =

South African legal case

In Minister of Safety and Security v Xaba 2003 (2) SA 703 (D); [2003] 1 All SA 596 (D); 2003 (7) BCLR 754 (D), an important case in South African criminal procedure, a bullet was lodged in Xaba's thigh. The Minister wanted to remove it, as the police believed that the bullet would connect X to the crime of a motor-vehicle hijacking.

The court held that section 12 of the Constitution, enshrining the right to dignity, would be unjustifiably infringed if it ordered such a removal.

The court further held that the word "search," when used in the context of the powers of search and seizure, does not include an operation under general anaesthetic. Even if it did, police could not delegate this power (or the right to use reasonable force in terms of section 27) to a doctor.

Furthermore, the court held that section 37(1)(c) does not intend to allow a police official to empower a medical practitioner to perform an operation; only limited surgery associated with the taking of a blood sample is allowed thereby.

== Notes ==
- Minister of Safety and Security v Xaba 2003 (2) SA 703 (D); [2003] 1 All SA 596 (D); 2003 (7) BCLR 754 (D)
