= S v Van Vuuren =

In S v Van Vuuren (1983), an important case in South African criminal procedure, Van Vuuren was convicted of murder and attempted murder in a shooting incident, and had claimed that he had been drinking heavily when he had been provoked, and had no knowledge of what he was doing when he fired the weapon. He was eventually convicted on both counts.

The court held that the summary of substantial facts of the case which shall accompany the indictment is not an integral part of the indictment. It is a statement of material facts to inform the accused of the allegations against him and the State is not required to set out exactly what evidence will be led to prove these allegations.

Furthermore, the Attorney-General has a discretion regarding how much information shall be disclosed in such a summary.

Moreover, the provisions of s144(3)(a)(i) make it plain that the Attorney-General is not bound by the contents thereof and may lead evidence at the trial of facts which are not in the summary.
