= S v Prins =

In S v Prins en 'n Ander, an important case in South African criminal procedure, the two appellants had been charged with both murder and robbery. They had attacked the complainant with a rake and he had died 9 days later from the injuries sustained from the attack. After the assault, they had robbed him.

On appeal it was contended that there had been a duplication of charges with a subsequent duplication of convictions.

The court held that the act of violence by the appellants on the deceased led to two separate results: the causing of the death of the deceased and the furnishing of an opportunity to remove the money and the goods.

The violence on the deceased had not been done with one intent but with the intent to rob the deceased as well to cause his death.

Thus the appellants had not been convicted twice of the same crime and there had not been an improper splitting of charges.
