= Supreme Diamonds v Du Bois =

Supreme Diamonds (Pty) Ltd v Du Bois; Regent Neckwear Manufacturing Co. (Pty) Ltd v Ehrke (1979 (3) SA 444 (W)) is an important case in South African law, heard and decided in the Witwatersrand Local Division by Goldstone AJ in 1979, on March 13 and 14 respectively. The case concerned applications for default judgments. The plaintiffs were represented by HS Danilowitz of Feinsteins.

== Facts ==
In two actions, the plaintiffs claimed default judgment, in terms of Rule of Court 31(2)(a), for (in the first case) the return of certain diamonds wrongfully alienated by the defendant or their value, and (in the second) the return of certain shirts, such claim being for specific performance, or their value.

== Judgment ==
Goldstone AJ found that the plaintiffs were clearly entitled to default judgment for the return of the diamonds and the shirts.

As to the alternative claims for their value, he held, as to the first case, that the alternative claim was a delictual claim for damages and was not a liquidated demand for the purposes of Rule of Court 31(2)(a). Accordingly, he found that the plaintiff was not entitled to a judgment on the alternative claim unless evidence was led to establish the value of the diamonds on the date of the alleged delict: that is, when the diamonds were wrongfully disposed of or alienated.

As to the second case, Goldstone AJ found that the alternative claim appeared to be one for damages as an alternative to specific performance. The value of the goods had to be determined at the date of judgment: Such claim could not be for a liquidated demand. He held, accordingly, that it was also necessary for the plaintiff to lead evidence to establish the value of the shirts at the date of judgment in order to be entitled to default judgment for the amount of the alternative claim.

== See also ==
- Civil procedure in South Africa
- Law of South Africa
