= Graaff-Reinet Municipality v Van Ryneveld's Pass Irrigation Board =

South African legal case

Graaff-Reinet Municipality v Van Ryneveld's Pass Irrigation Board is an important case in South African law. It was heard in the Appellate Division on March 6, 1950, with judgment handed down on March 21. The judges were Watermeyer CJ, Centlivres JA, Schreiner JA, Van Den Heever JA, and Murray AJA. The case was an appeal from a decision in the Cape Provincial Division by Steyn J and Searle J. The appellant's attorneys were Herold, Gie & Broadhead, Cape Town, and McIntyre & Watkeys, Bloemfontein. The respondent's attorneys were Mostert & Bosman, Cape Town, and Reitz, Barry & Berning, Bloemfontein.

The case concerned a claim or dispute as to water rights conferred in an agreement. The court considered whether it could act under section 102 of the General Law Amendment Act, and when a declaration of rights could be granted.

The case is still frequently cited for its definition of "jurisdiction" as "the power or competence of a Court to hear and determine an issue between parties, and limitations may be put upon such power in relation to territory, subject matter, amount in dispute, parties etc."

== Arguments ==
=== Appellant ===
AJ Smit, KC, argued that the subject-matter of the application was not a claim nor a dispute with regard to the right to use water. Even if the issues involved a dispute about the use of water, section 34 of the Irrigation Act did not, in his view, oust the jurisdiction of the Supreme Court in matters where there was only a claim for a declaration of rights and no claim for consequential relief. The Municipality could claim no consequential relief at the moment, he contended, since there was no infringement, at least not yet, of any right. In an application like the present one, for a declaration of rights without claiming relief, brought before the introduction of section 102 of the General Law Amendment Act, neither the Water Court nor the Supreme Court would have had jurisdiction in the matter. At common law, Smit continued, the Supreme Court did not have it, and the Water Court did not have it, since it was a creature of statute. The fact that it was only given the same right as the Supreme Court by the Magistrates' Courts Act, passed in 1944, showed that it did not have it previously. This meant, Smit claimed, that sections 32(a) and (b) did not include the right which was given in section 32(b)(bis) by section 5 of the Magistrates' Courts Act. Section 34, therefore, could not be said to cover such a right. With section 102 of the General Law Amendment Act, the legislature had conferred jurisdiction on the Supreme Court to grant a declaration of rights where no consequential relief was claimed. This section, he observed, did not restrict its jurisdiction and did not exclude rights relating to water; nor did section 34 of the Irrigation Act at that time oust the jurisdiction of the Supreme Court

- because, if it had done so, then no Court would have had jurisdiction in matters as to water rights to grant a declaration of such rights, as the Water Court did not have it;
- because section 34 could at most only oust the Supreme Court's jurisdiction in a matter referred to therein in which the Water Court had jurisdiction; and
- because, since sections 32 (a) and (b) did not give the Water Court jurisdiction in a matter where a declaration of rights without consequential relief was claimed, it must be assumed that section 34 did not cover such a case at that time.

In 1944, the Water Court was granted powers similar to those contained in section 102 of the General Law Amendment Act.

=== Respondent ===
NJ Grobler, KC, noted that it was clear that the dispute was one as to water rights, and argued that from this it followed that the jurisdiction of the Supreme Court had been ousted by the provisions of section 34 of the Irrigation Act. The fact that the declaration of rights claimed did not include a claim for consequential relief was irrelevant, in Grobler's view. He observed that section 34 covered a claim such as the present one. Even, he continued, if the dispute could properly be regarded as one in regard to the manner in which admitted rights were to be exercised, it would, in this case, nevertheless amount to a dispute or claim as to water rights.

The dicta in De Wet v Deetlefs, which might, perhaps, be read to express a contrary view, were too widely stated for Grobler's liking, and did not apply, he argued, to a case such as the present; in any event, De Wet was clearly distinguishable from the present case.

== Judgment ==
Watermeyer CJ found—and Centlivres JA, Schreiner JA, Van Den Heever JA and Murray AJA concurred—that section 102 of the General Law Amendment Act does not authorise the Supreme Court to hear and determine a claim or dispute as to water rights which has not reached the stage of actionable maturity: that is, the stage at which an infringement of the legal rights of one of the parties, which gives the other party a right to claim consequential relief, has taken place. The decision of the Cape Provincial Division, in Graaff-Reinet Municipality v van Ryneveld's Pass Irrigation Board, was thus confirmed.

== See also ==
- Jurisdiction
- Civil procedure in South Africa
