= De Kock v Davidson and Others =

South African legal case

De Kock v Davidson and Others is an important case in South African civil procedure. It was an application for a rule nisi, heard in the Transvaal Provincial Division by Colman J on November 3 and 4, 1970; judgment was delivered on November 11. The applicant's attorneys were Michael Kerbel, Johannesburg, and Getz, Behr, Ogus & Mendel Cohen, Pretoria. The respondent's attorneys were Divin, Davis & Miller, Johannesburg, and Carson, Haswell & Co., Pretoria. The applicant was represented in court by J. Unterhalter, SC (with him MM Joffe); SA Rosenzweig appeared for the respondents.

The application involved the issue of costs. The applicant had applied for order with which the respondents would anyway have complied. The matter was not one of urgency, and no prior demand had been made of the respondent. The applicant, accordingly, was ordered to pay costs of application.

== Facts ==
The applicant had applied for an order calling upon the first and second respondents to transfer to him certain shares in the third respondent, a company in which they held the shares, and to appoint him a director. The respondents, in a replying affidavit, conceded that the applicant was entitled to the orders prayed for.

== Judgement ==
The court, however, held that, as there was no question of urgency, and as there should have been a demand first, and as the respondents would clearly have complied with such a demand, the applicant should pay the costs of the application. "A person," wrote Colman J, "who has instituted unnecessary litigation when he knew, or ought to have known, that it was, or might be, unnecessary, should ordinarily bear the costs of that litigation," adding in conclusion, "It seems to me, therefore, that the costs of the application should be borne by the person who needlessly caused them to be incurred, namely the applicant."
