= Smith v Smith =

South African legal case

Smith v Smith is an important case in South African law, in particular in the area of civil procedure. It was heard and decided in the Witwatersrand Local Division by Millin J on 22 January 1947. An action for judgment on motion under Rule of Court 42, the case concerned the service of summons at the defendant's place of business, and specifically whether or not the definition of "place of business," in terms of Rule of Court 20, was met by the place at which the defendant is employed. In other words, could it be said of the employee of a business that his "place of business" was the place of that business? The court held that it could not. The plaintiff was represented by P. Cillie of Sasto & Louis.

== Facts ==
A return of service on a defendant, cited as "a learner miner, No. 11 Shaft, Rand Leases," read as follows:

This is to certify that on 13th December, 1946, after failing to find defendant personally, I handed a copy of the summons to Mr. J. F., Chief Paymaster at Rand Leases G.M. Co., Florida, and at the same time explained the nature and exigency thereof to him.

== Judgment ==
Millin J found that a person employed by another at a certain place does not have his place of business at that place. He held, accordingly, that the service was bad.

== See also ==
- Civil procedure in South Africa
- Law of South Africa
