= Soffiantini v Mould =

South African legal case

Soffiantini v Mould is an important case in South African law. An appeal from a decision of Back AJ, it was heard in the Eastern Districts Local Division by Price JP, Jennett J and Wynne J on 30 July 1956. Judgment was handed down on 14 August 1956. The appellant's attorneys were Espin & Espin. The respondent's attorney was LB Green. The case concerned the relationship between landlord and tenant, and confirmed that, under the common law, a landlord is not entitled to enter leased premises without consent. The trespassing landlord can be interdicted.

The Court also found that, in respect of applications and motions, it is the duty of the Court to decide difficult issues of fact on affidavit where justice so requires.

== Argument ==
PF O'Hagan, QC. (with him TM Mullins), for the appellant, submitted that whether the respondent's rights were in fact infringed by the appellant was disputed on the affidavits, and that the court a quo should not have attempted to decide that dispute without hearing evidence. A final interdict should not have been granted on motion: The respondent should have been given a temporary interdict, pending action, or the learned judge could have heard viva voce evidence under Rule of Court 6.

NC Addleson, for the respondent, argued that, on the affidavits, the undisputed facts were such as to justify a final interdict. It was not disputed that the respondent had the contractual rights of a lessee and that the appellant had entered the premises on five occasions in such a manner that the respondent's attorney had once to be called before he left. The appellant was claiming an unrestricted right of entry which is in breach of the respondent's right to commodus usus. Such a breach entitled the respondent to a final interdict, since a lessor who enters leased premises without permission is a trespasser. The absence of prejudice to the appellant was a factor which the court a quo correctly took into account. Alternatively, Addleson continued, there was no bona fide dispute which could not be resolved on affidavit.

As to the application to strike out, the Court would not encourage applications which were purely technical and which unnecessarily increased the costs without affecting the merits. The allegations, concluded Addleson, were properly before the Court. The further affidavits for the respondent did not introduce any new matter.

== Judgment ==
Price JP held — and Jennett J and Wynne J concurred — that the fact that a landlord may have a reasonable purpose for entering leased premises does not entitle him to do so without the permission of the tenant. If he does so, he is thereby constituted a trespasser, and the lessee is entitled to protect his rights by means of an interdict.

It is necessary, the Court found, to make a robust, common-sense approach to a dispute on motion; otherwise the effective functioning of the Court can be hamstrung and circumvented by the most simple and blatant stratagem. The Court must not hesitate to decide an issue of fact on affidavit merely because it may be difficult to do so. Justice can be defeated or seriously impeded and delayed by an over-fastidious approach to a dispute raised in affidavits.

== See also ==
- Civil procedure in South Africa
