= Adfin v Durable Engineering Works =

South African legal case

Adfin (Pty) Ltd v Durable Engineering Works (Pty) Ltd is an important case in South African law, particularly in the area of civil procedure. An application to set aside the respondent's combined summons as an irregular proceeding, it was heard in the Cape Provincial Division by Berman J on 16 February 1990. Judgment was handed down on 2 March. The applicant's attorneys were Saacks & Jaffe; the respondent's were Bornman & Hayward. E. Sakinofsky appeared for the applicant and LM Olivier for the respondent.

The case was a review of a decision by the Master to reject an objection to the liquidator's account. Proceedings were initiated by way of combined summons. The application was to set aside the combined summons as an irregular proceeding on the grounds that the provisions of Rule 53 of Uniform Rules of Court (providing that proceedings on review "shall be by way of notice of motion") and of section 407(4)(a) of the Companies Act (providing that a person aggrieved by the Master's direction may "apply to Court") required that proceedings be brought by way of notice of motion. The court dismissed application on the grounds that neither Rule 53 nor section 407(4)(a) rendered proceedings by way of notice of motion peremptory.

== Facts ==
The applicant sought an order setting aside the respondent's combined summons as an irregular proceeding on the grounds that the relief sought (an order setting aside the Master's decision to reject the respondent's objection to an account lodged by the liquidator of a company being wound up) should have been sought in motion proceedings, not by way of combined summons.

== Judgment ==
The Supreme Court, noted Berman J, was free to condone non-compliance with a Rule of Court. It was also free to regulate its own procedure in the exercise of its inherent jurisdiction to ensure that justice was done. Rule 53 of the Uniform Rules of Court, which provides, inter alia, that proceedings on review "shall be by way of notice of motion," is a procedural provision, formulated for the benefit and assistance of a person aggrieved by a decision of a person or body referred to therein. There was no good reason why such a person could not waive the right afforded to him by the Rule. It could not be said, therefore, that the provisions of Rule 53 were peremptory.

Section 407(4)(a) of the Companies Act provided that a person aggrieved by any direction of the Master under that section might "apply to Court for an order setting aside the Master's decision." The word "apply" usually connotes proceedings by way of notice of motion, and Rule 6(1) of the Uniform Rules of Court provided that "every application shall be brought on notice of motion." Rule 6, like Rule 53, was a procedural Rule; while matters involving applications to Court were usually brought under the provisions of Rule 6 and in the manner provided for therein, such procedure was not, wrote Berman J, invariably followed.

The application was therefore dismissed on the grounds that neither Rule 53 nor section 407(4)(a) rendered proceedings by way of notice of motion peremptory.

== See also ==
- Civil procedure in South Africa
