= Room Hire v Jeppe Street Mansions =

South African legal case

Room Hire Co (Pty) Ltd v Jeppe Street Mansions (Pty) Ltd is an important case in South African law: the leading case, indeed, on disputes of fact. It was heard in the Transvaal Provincial Division on April 28 and 29, 1949, with judgement on July 15. Murray AJP, Ramsbottom J and Blackwell J presided. A. Shacksonvis KC (with him A. Mendelow) appeared for the appellant, and A. Suzman KC (with him MJ Hart) for the respondent. The appellant's attorneys were Schwartz & Goldblatt; the respondent's were Podlashuc, Meintjes, Liebson & Klagsbrun.

The case was an appeal from a decision in the Witwatersrand Local Division by Neser J. Its significance lies in the area of civil procedure, with its determination that the court in application proceedings, where a material fact arises which cannot be resolved by viva voce evidence, may either direct the parties to trial or dismiss the application with costs.

== Judgment ==
Ramsbottom J and Blackwell J concurred in the judgment of Murray AJP, who reiterated that, except in interlocutory matters, it is undesirable to attempt to settle disputes of fact solely on the probabilities disclosed in contradictory affidavits. Where no real dispute of fact exists, there is no reason for incurring the delay and expense involved in a trial action: Motion proceedings in such a case are generally recognised as permissible.

Where a dispute of fact is shown to exist, however, the court has a discretion as to the future course of the proceedings. If the dispute of fact cannot properly be determined by viva voce evidence under Rule 9, the parties may be sent to trial in the ordinary way (either on the affidavits as constituting the pleadings, or else with a direction that pleadings be filed); otherwise the application may be dismissed with costs. However in this case the court concluded that a real dispute of fact had been shown and that the court aqou should hear oral evidence on the issue in terms of the rules - matter referred back to court aquo.

== See also ==
- Civil procedure in South Africa
- Law of South Africa
- Motion (legal)
