= Hlatshwayo v Hein =

South African legal case

Hlatshwayo and Others v Hein is an important case in South African law, particularly in the area of civil procedure, with its determination that parties should not be deterred from enforcing their rights for fear of an adverse costs order.

== Facts ==
The parties had incorrectly, but with good faith and reasonable belief, sought an appeal from the Land Claims Court (LCC). There had been no precedent dealing with the appellate jurisdiction of the court. This raised an issue of fundamental importance to all affected by the Land Reform (Labour Tenants) Act.

The Land Claims Court must adapt its approach to costs orders to take into account factors which are peculiar to it. The principles which have been adopted in relation to the award of costs may need to be substantially adapted in cases of public interest which differs from conventional litigation.

== Judgment ==
The court had that the LCC does not regard itself as bound to follow the usual approach of the superior courts in awarding costs. It will give due weight to the constitutional obligation to promote the fundamental right of access to the courts in such a way that legitimate litigants will not be deterred from approaching the court to have disputes settled for fear of an adverse cost order. There was, therefore, no order for the costs of the appeal.
