= Luna Meubel v Makin =

South African legal case

Luna Meubel Vervaardigers (Edms) Bpk v Makin and Another (t/a Makin's Furniture Manufacturers) is an important case in South African civil procedure on the question of how and when an urgent application may be brought. It was heard in the Witwatersrand Local Division by Coetzee J on December 13, 1976, and judgment handed down the following day. BEM du Toit (of De Villiers, Scholtz & Van der Walt) appeared for the applicant; there was no appearance for the respondents. The case concerned an urgent application for an interdict and revolved around the question of what, exactly, urgency involves—specifically, when the established filing and sitting times of the court may be departed from. Coetzee J held that practitioners must carefully determine whether a greater or lesser degree of relaxation of the Rules and practice of the court is required.

== Judgment ==
Coetzee J found that "urgency" in respect of urgent applications, which are not ex parte applications under Rule of Court 6(4), involves, mainly, the abridgement of times prescribed by the Rules, and, secondly, the departure from established filing and sitting times of the court.

He held that the following factors, in ascending order of urgency, must be borne in mind:

1. The question is whether there must be a departure at all from the times prescribed in Rule 6(5)(b). Usually this involves a departure from the time of seven days which must elapse from the date of service of the papers until the stated day for hearing. Once that is so, this requirement may be ignored and the application may be set down for hearing on the first available motion day, but regard must still be had to the necessity of filing the papers with the Registrar by the preceding Thursday so that it can come onto the following week's motion roll, which will be prepared by the Motion Court Judge on duty for that week.
2. Only if the matter is so urgent that the applicant cannot wait for the next motion day, from the point of view of his obligation to file the papers by the preceding Thursday, may he consider placing it on the roll for the next Tuesday, without having filed his papers by the previous Thursday.
3. Only if the urgency be such that the applicant dare not wait even for the next Tuesday may he set the matter down for hearing on the next court day at the normal time of 10:00 or for the same day if the court has not yet adjourned.
4. Once the court has dealt with the causes for that day and has adjourned, and only if the applicant cannot possibly wait for the hearing until the next court day at the normal time that the court sits, he may set the matter down forthwith for hearing at any reasonably convenient time, in consultation with the Registrar, even if that be at night or during a weekend.

Practitioners, Coetzee J held, should carefully analyse the facts of each case to determine, for the purposes of setting the case down for hearing, whether a greater or lesser degree of relaxation of the Rules and of the ordinary practice of the court is required. The degree of relaxation should not be greater than the exigency of the case demands. It must be commensurate with that exigency. Mere lip service to the requirements of Rule 6(12)(b) will not do; an applicant must make out a case in the founding affidavit to justify the particular extent of the departure from the norm, which is involved in the time and day for which the matter be set down.

== See also ==
- Civil procedure in South Africa
- Law of South Africa
