= Domicilium citandi et executandi =

Domicilium citandi et executandi is a Latin legal term meaning the address nominated by a party in a legal contract where legal notices may be sent; the onus usually being upon that party to notify the other signatory of any change in address, especially to be ready to receive any notice that is delivered to that address.

For instance, the delivery of a legal notice to the address of the domicilium citandi et executandi of a party to a contract can be considered legally sufficient for that notice to be considered received by that party, without the need for the person giving notice actually to find the person.

One or both parties to a contract may demand the other nominate a domicilium citandi et executandi, typically in order to expedite later legal procedures relating to a contract by making it impossible for a party to claim that a legal notice was not received.

The literal translation from Latin into English is "house for summoning and upkeep".

The Latin term is commonly used within the legal jurisdiction of Zimbabwe and South Africa.
