= Civil procedure in South Africa =

Civil procedure in RSA

Civil procedure in South Africa is the formal rules and standards that courts follow in that country when adjudicating civil suits (as opposed to procedures in criminal law matters). The legal realm is divided broadly into substantive and procedural law. Substantive law is that law which defines the contents of rights and obligations between legal subjects; procedural law regulates how those rights and obligations are enforced. These rules govern how a lawsuit or case may be commenced, and what kind of service of process is required, along with the types of pleadings or statements of case, motions or applications, and orders allowed in civil cases, the timing and manner of depositions and discovery or disclosure, the conduct of trials, the process for judgment, various available remedies, and how the courts and clerks are to function.

== Sources ==
The sources of civil procedure in South Africa are to be found in the Magistrates' Courts Act and Rules, the Superior Courts Act (which repealed and replaced the Supreme Court Act), the Uniform Rules of Court, jurisprudence, court practice rules and other legislation. Notice ought also to be taken of the Seventeenth Constitutional Amendment Bill. Since its establishment in 1985, the Rules Board alone has competence to make rules for courts.

=== Constitution ===
The Constitution of the Republic of South Africa, 1996, as the supreme law of the Republic, provides the overarching framework for civil procedure; the Constitution has been responsible for significant changes to civil procedure since its inception in the 1990s, as in, for example, debt collection matters, access to the courts and prescription, in particular with respect to litigation against the state.

Section 8 applies Chapter 2 of the Constitution, the Bill of Rights, to "all law". Therefore, litigation cannot be conducted without considering section 36 of the Constitution, the limitations clause; and several Chapter 2 rights directly relate to the law of civil procedure: the right to equality before the law (section 9), to freedom and security (12), to property (25), to have access to adequate housing (26), and the right to have access to courts (34).

== Courts ==
=== System ===
The South African court system comprises the lower courts, including indigenous courts, and other judicial and quasi-judicial bodies established by legislation; the superior courts, which the Superior Courts Act defines as the Constitutional Court, the Supreme Court of Appeal, and the High Courts; and special courts such as the Small Claims Court, the Labour Court, the Competition Appeal Court, the Tax Courts, the Land Claims Court, and the Electoral Court.

Different procedures apply in different courts. There is only a slight distinction between the procedures of the High Court and those in the Magistrate's Court; save where otherwise indicated, it is safe to assume that the form and content of the proceedings is the same. However, both courts have their own empowering statutes and court rules. The Act, in each case, sets out what kinds of disputes may be heard by each court, and the rules prescribe how the disputes will be brought before court: that is to say, the form of pleadings and time limits.

==== Magistrate's Court ====
The magistrate's courts are the lower courts in South Africa. These are so-called "creatures of statute", governed by and created under the Magistrates' Courts Act, and therefore do not have inherent jurisdiction. This means that they may only hear matters prescribed by the Act. There are two kinds: the district Magistrate's Court and the Regional Magistrate's Court. The Republic of South Africa is divided into magisterial districts and regional divisions, and each has a magistrates' court. The Regional Court was previously only a criminal court; however, since August 2010, it has also had civil jurisdiction. Matters in the magistrate's court are presided over by a magistrate under the leadership of a Chief magistrate.

Section 4(3) of the Magistrates' Courts Act provides that all processes issued in a magistrates' court apply throughout the country.

In terms of the Seventeenth Constitutional Amendment Bill, the Magistrate's Court would be renamed the "Lower Court," and the presiding magistrates known as "Magistrates," who would be appointed by the Judicial Service Commission. It is anticipated that both the Seventeenth Constitutional Amendment Bill and the Superior Courts Bill will be promulgated in 2012.

==== High Court ====
The term "High Court" is misleading, because it suggests that there is only one, whereas in reality there are many, divided into provincial (CPD, ECD, NCD, TPD, NCP, OPD) and local divisions (WLD, DCLD, SECLD).

The High Court enjoys "inherent jurisdiction", which means that it derives its powers from common law (although statutory law does modify these powers). It is due to this inherent jurisdiction that the High Court may hear any matter, whereas lower courts are more limited. Inherent jurisdiction will be exercised in order to prevent abuse of the law, which ultimately exists to properly facilitate the administration of justice. Inherent jurisdiction was subsumed under section 173 of the Constitution of the Republic of South Africa: courts now cannot exercise jurisdiction beyond the ambit of the Constitution.

Matters in the High Court are presided over by judges under the leadership of the Judge President. Administration is led by the office of the Registrar of the High Court, whose duties are similar to those of the clerk of the court.

==== Supreme Court of Appeal ====
The Supreme Court of Appeal (SCA), located in Bloemfontein, is the highest court in appeal cases with no constitutional basis. Matters in the SCA are presided over by judges under the leadership of the President of the Supreme Court of Appeal. In terms of the amendments proposed in the Seventeenth Constitutional Amendment Bill, the Constitutional Court would become the highest court in respect of all matters (not just those in which a constitutional point is raised), so that leave to appeal any decision of a high court would be granted directly to the Constitutional Court if this is deemed to be in the interest of justice. The SCA would continue to exist; indeed, its workload would be enhanced, in that it would have to deal also with appeals from courts of similar status to that of a High Court, such as the Competition's Court and the Labour Court.

==== Constitutional Court ====
This is the highest court in constitutional matters. It is located in Johannesburg and is presided over by judges under the leadership of the Chief Justice.

=== Personnel ===
Owing to the volume of administrative work involved in court matters, each court has a comprehensive system of administration. The key officer in civil matters is the Clerk or Registrar of the Court. This official undertakes such administrative duties as issuing summonses, receiving pleadings, compiling court rolls and keeping records, and also has the task of noting judgments in certain matters.

In practice, the roles of Clerk and Registrar are often covered by the same person, who wears different hats depending on whether she administers lower-court or regional-court matters.

The sheriff of the court (known formerly as the messenger of court) is a creature of statute, created by the Sheriff's Act, which came into force in 1990. Her jurisdiction is specific, and her duties are set out in section 14 of the Magistrates' Courts Act and in the Rules. She has the power to deliver and serve court documents and judgments, to execute writs and to conduct arrests. Whereas the clerk or registrar plays a mostly administrative role, the sheriff is charged with more practical matters.

Finally, there are legal representatives and presiding officers.

== Pre-litigation ==
A civil dispute may be and usually is divided into three stages:

- pre-litigation;
- litigation; and
- post-litigation.

The pre-litigation stage involves certain preliminary enquiries: into, for example, whether there is in fact a case, the kind of action to be taken, the identity of the person against whom it is to be pursued, for how much, by whom, and in which court—everything, that is, which must occur prior to the point at which a dispute is actually referred to a court. It may also involve correspondence with an opponent and the sending of a letter of demand.

=== Cause of action ===
One of the first questions to be asked is on what basis the claim is founded; what, in other words, is the cause of action? The cause of action is essential in identifying the elements which must be proved to be successful with the claim. It is therefore an enquiry into substantive law, assisting in the determination of the appropriate civil procedure to be followed. Examples include breach of contract and damages in delict. The best way to deal with a matter is to identify the cause of action with as much particularity as possible. In the case of breach of contract, for example, one should identify the type of breach, be it misrepresentation or mora debitoris or something else. A set of facts may disclose multiple causes of action: In the case of a motor-vehicle collision in which a breadwinner dies, a claimant may sue both for damage to the vehicle and for loss of support.

=== Locus standi ===
Before a party may sue in a court of law, he has to prove that he has title to sue. This is determined by two questions:

1. whether a particular person or juristic person is the right party to sue; and
2. whether that person has the ability or capacity to sue.

==== Grounds ====
Under the common law, a litigant had title to sue if he could show that he had a direct and substantial interest in the matter. The requirements were as follows:

- the plaintiff must have had an adequate interest, not merely a technical one;
- the interest must not have been too far removed;
- the interest must have been actual, not abstract or academic; and
- the interest must have been current, not hypothetical.

In actions based on the Bill of Rights, the grounds on which a litigant may have locus standi are listed in section 38, in terms of which the following may litigate:

- anyone acting in his own interest;
- anyone acting on behalf of another person who cannot act in his own name;
- anyone acting as a member of, or in the interest of, a group or a class of persons;
- anyone acting in the public interest; and
- an association acting in the interest of its members.

==== Capacity ====
Someone may be the right person to litigate, but he may still lack capacity to sue. Capacity determines a litigant's title not only to sue, but also to be sued. The general rule is that natural and juristic persons have the capacity to sue. There are, however, certain exceptions:

- minors;
- insane persons;
- prodigals; and
- insolvents.

There is also special position of the following:

- judges;
- diplomats;
- fugitives from justice;
- trusts; and
- partnerships.

==== Jurisdiction ====
Once a person has decided what is his cause of action, and who is going to institute the claim, he can determine out of which court to sue. The general principle in jurisdiction is that the plaintiff has the choice, because he is dominus litis. There are various factors which may affect where a case will be heard:

- residence;
- cause of action;
- the place where the dispute arose;
- the quantum and nature of the claim;
- consent;
- location of the property; and
- other factors.

Very often there will be more than one court with jurisdiction. In such a case the plaintiff may simply choose out of which court to sue. He must ensure, however, that he minimises his own cost. Jurisdiction is dealt with in the Magistrates' Courts Act and the Supreme Court Act.

===== Residence =====
In terms of section 28 of the Magistrates' Courts Act, a court has jurisdiction over all persons residing within its jurisdiction as well as all property situated within its jurisdiction. It is evident from this section that the court has jurisdiction over the following:

- any person who resides, is employed in or carries on business within the district, where "person" includes the state, body corporate, municipalities, and corporations, and where the key is permanence, so that a person employed for a short period, or visiting a place for a short period, cannot be said to "reside" there;
- any partnership with its business premises in the area, or whose members reside in the district, which allows one, in spite of the common law, to sue a partnership in its name; and
- any person in respect of proceedings incidental to any action or proceeding instituted in the court by such person himself, which deals with the case where a plaintiff sues out of the wrong court and is met by a counterclaim. The plaintiff in convention can only continue in that wrong court if his claim is incidental—i.e. arises out of the same facts—as the original claim.

===== Cause of action =====
Section 28 also confers jurisdiction over any person, regardless of residence or employment, if the cause of action arose entirely within the jurisdiction of the court.

===== Where the dispute arose =====
The court has jurisdiction in terms of section 28 over any party to interpleader proceedings if

- the execution creditor and every claimant to the subject matter reside, carry out business or are employed within the area;
- the subject matter have been attached by the court; and
- all parties consent.

Interpleader proceedings occur when one party intervenes in execution proceedings, usually because property attached while in the possession of the other party belongs to him. The interpleader summons is issued therefore to try to prevent the sheriff from selling off property that belongs to the first party.

===== Quantum and nature of the claim =====
The district magistrate's court may only hear a matter with a quantum of up to R200,000. The regional court may hear matters with a quantum of up to R400,000. One may not sue for more than these amounts in these courts; nor may one institute a claim whose judgment value is more than these amounts.

The court may hear the following cases:

- delivery or transfer of immoveable or moveable property;
- claims for ejectment;
- actions for the determination of a right of way;
- claims based on liquid documents or mortgage bonds;
- actions arising out of a credit agreement;
- actions arising out of section 16 of the Matrimonial Property Act;
- actions including application for the liquidation of a close corporation; and
- other actions where the quantum is below the stated figure.

There are certain matters which cannot be heard in the magistrate's court. These are dealt with in section 46 of the Act and include

- matters concerning the validity or interpretation of a will or other testamentary document;
- matters in which the status of a person is affected;
- matters in which is sought a decree of perpetual silence; and
- matters involving specific performance without the alternative of damages, except
  - the rendering of an account in which the claim does not exceed the prescribed monetary jurisdiction; and
  - delivery or transfer of property, moveable or immoveable, where the value of the property does not exceed the prescribed amount.

===== Consent =====
The court has jurisdiction over any defendant who appears and does not object to its jurisdiction. A defendant who fails to object to jurisdiction in his plea is deemed to have consented to jurisdiction. Note, however, that there may be some exceptions, and that such a defendant may only consent to jurisdiction over his person and cannot consent where the court lacks jurisdiction in any event. :)

===== Location of property =====
Any person who owns immoveable property situated within the area of jurisdiction of the court, where such action is in respect of that property or a mortgage bond over that property, is subject to the jurisdiction of the court.

===== Other factors =====
Section 30bis deals with court orders for the attachment of property or person to found jurisdiction. This usually occurs where the defendant resides outside the Republic and there is another basis for the court's jurisdiction.

===== Jurisdiction in the High Court =====
The Constitution, in section 169, permits High Courts to hear any matter save

- cases that can be heard only by the Constitutional Court; and
- cases which have been assigned by an act of parliament to another court with a status similar to that of the High Court.

Otherwise the High Court enjoys jurisdiction over all persons residing and all causes of action arising within its area of jurisdiction. There are three common grounds of jurisdiction in the High Court:

1. domicile (ratio domicilii);
2. cause of action (ratione res gestae); and
3. property situated within the court's area (ratione rei sitae).

High Court jurisdiction is founded on the doctrine of effectiveness, which refers to the principle that a claimant must sue out of the court which will be most effective in giving a judgment: that is, the court which is best positioned to enforce the judgment.

=== Demand ===
In certain cases, a demand is required as a prerequisite for litigation, failing which a cause of action cannot arise and any action instituted will be premature. The rules of substantive law determine whether or not a demand is an essential element of the cause of action; generally speaking, a demand is required in two instances:

1. to complete a cause of action; and
2. where legislation requires it.

A demand can be made orally or in writing. The purpose of the demand is to inform the prospective defendant/respondent:

- that a particular legal representative acts on behalf of the prospective plaintiff/applicant;
- about the nature and content of the claim;
- that payment or performance is being requested;
- about the time period within which action is required; and
- about the consequences of failure to comply with the demand

in order to convince the person to meet their obligations and thus avoid litigation. NB:it is worth noting that a demand must not threaten the other part, instead it should warn the part on what follows after failing to comply.

== Litigation ==
Once the pre-litigation issues have been settled, the formal litigation process begins. This stage involves

- the exchange of documents;
- time limits;
- compliance with court rules and procedures; and, finally,
- the trial or hearing.

In civil procedure, there are two ways to litigate:

1. action (or summons) proceedings, which are brought by means of a summons; and
2. application (or motion) proceedings, which are launched by means of notice of motion.

If the incorrect form of litigation is used, the court may refuse to hear the case or to hear it in its present form, or may allow it to be heard but penalise the party which used the incorrect form when it issues an order for costs.

=== Courts ===
Action proceedings are heard in so-called "trial court". During the trial, parties endeavour to prove the basic facts formulated in the pleadings, by means of witnesses who appear in person and who provide oral, documentary, or real evidence. These witnesses are examined in chief, cross-examined, and re-examined. After all evidence has been led, argument is addressed to the court on the pleadings and on the evidence, and judgment is then delivered.

Application proceedings are heard in so-called "motion court". There are two main types of applications, opposed applications and unopposed applications. Unopposed applications are more common and often only last a few minutes each, so they make up most of the court's roll. Opposed applications are set down separately for hearing, days in advance, and are heard after the unopposed matters have been dealt with. The applicant and respondent confine themselves to arguing only the issues "on the papers", meaning that the arguments are limited to legal submissions; the procedure resembles the closing argument stage that normally occurs at the end of a trial action.

=== Actions ===
A summons has been defined as "a court process in which the defendant is called upon to enter appearance to defend the action within a stipulated time and to answer the claim of the plaintiff, and in which he is warned of the consequences of failure to do so." Action proceedings are characterised by a clear distinction between the pleading stage, and the trial and evidence stage.

==== Pleadings ====
The pleadings consist of ‘'printed or written statements'’. Except where a party is appearing in person, he or she does not draft or sign the pleadings; this is done by the legal representative.

What follows is a series of documentary exchanges, called pleadings, between the parties akin to a conversation on paper. Each party's legal representative sets out the material facts of their complaint or defence, as the case may be, in summary form. This effectively means that conclusions of fact are pleaded. Because pleadings consist of simple statements and do not disclose evidence, they are not affirmed under oath. The procedure is strictly regulated by the rules of court, not least with respect to the time limits that have to be observed. Failure to comply with the rules of court can be fatal for a case.

Once the process of pleading is completed, the action is set down for trial, where the parties will attempt to prove, with evidence, what is averred in the pleadings.

===== Summons =====
Summons proceedings are characterised by a clear distinction between the pleading stage and the trial stage.

There are three types of summons:

1. a simple or ordinary summons;
2. a combined summons; and
3. a provisional sentence summons.

A simple summons is a document which contains the basis (the particulars of the claim) for the plaintiff's action in the body of the summons. The simple summons is the High Court equivalent of the ordinary summons in the Magistrate's Court. A combined summons, on the other hand, has a more detailed and separate document containing the particulars of claim and is annexed to the summons. As a general rule, the simple summons is used where the claim is for a debt or a liquidated demand. There are certain matters for which a combined summons is prescribed: for example, in divorce matters. In the High Court, however, it is customary only to use a simple summons when one is certain that it is appropriate to do so.

A provisional sentence summons is one whereby a creditor in possession of a liquid document may sue speedily. If the debtor cannot dispute the validity of the liquid document, a provisional judgment will be entered against him. Only once he has paid the judgment debt as security will the debtor be able to enter into the merits of the case. In a recent Constitutional Court decision, it was held that various aspects of the provisional summons procedure were inconsistent with the Constitution.

The contents of the summons are set out in Rules 5 and 7 of the Magistrates' Courts Act. Similar provisions are contained in Rule 17 of the Uniform Rules of Court. The summons consists of the following:

- a warning;
- a form of consent to judgment;
- a form of appearance to defend;
- a notice drawing attention to section 109 of the Act;
- a notice drawing attention to sections 57, 58, 65A and 65D of Act;
- the address at which plaintiff will receive service of all process;
- a signature;
- citations of parties;
- averment of jurisdiction;
- particulars of Claim; and
- a prayer.

The summons is usually signed by an attorney, or by the plaintiff personally if he is not represented. Once it has been drafted, it must be issued by the clerk of the court or the registrar, who places a stamp on the document and gives it a case number. Rule 10 of the previous court rules provided for the lapsing of a summons after twelve months if service has not taken place by then. No such provision appears in the amended court rules.

===== Particulars of claim =====
The rules of court prescribe both the form of the particulars as well as the content(HC rule 18 and MC rule 6). It is only from the particulars that one can see the basis of the action as well as the relief sought. The particulars of claim, then, sets out the facts that give rise to the claim as well as what the plaintiff wants the court to decide.

In a simple summons, the particulars appear in abbreviated form, often in one line. Prior to the new Magistrates' Court Rules, a defendant who wished to find out more did so by delivering to the plaintiff a request for further particulars in terms of Rule 16 of the Magistrates' Courts Act. No such rule exists in the High Court, and Rule 16 has now also been replaced by Rule 15, which refers to a declaration. The declaration is a separate document in which the Plaintiff must set out his particulars of claim in the same precise manner as he would in a combined summons.

Rule 6 of the Magistrates' Courts Act, and Rule 18 of the Uniform Rules, set out the form and content of pleadings in general. With respect to the form, particulars of claim must be divided into separate paragraphs and numbered consecutively with each averment appearing in a separate paragraph.

With regards to the content, it must contain the following:

- a heading;
- a statement of the facts on which the claim is based;
- jurisdiction;
- a cause of action; and
- a prayer.

Rule 6 of the new Magistrates' Court Rules and Rule 18 of the High Court have specific rules regarding certain categories of cases, namely

- damages;
- contractual matters; and
- matrimonial matters.

Failure to comply with these rules will result in the pleading's being irregular.

===== Service of the summons =====
Once the summons has been issued by the registrar or clerk of the court, it may be served. Service of court process is undertaken by the sheriff. In practice, the attorney takes the original summons with any annexures, together with one copy for the defendant (or as many copies as there are defendants) to the sheriff. The sheriff will deliver the document to the defendant. There are prescribed forms of service that are permitted by law. The following general terms apply to the service of documents:

- Service must be effected by the specific sheriff appointed to operate in that particular jurisdiction.
- Service may not be effected on a Sunday or a public holiday (with some exceptions).
- Service must be effected without undue delay.
- Any person obstructing the sheriff in the carrying out of his duties is guilty of an offence.

On arrival at the defendant's house, the Sheriff hands to the defendant a copy of the process and is required to show him the original and to explain the meaning of the document. The defendant will often sign on the back page of the process to acknowledge receipt thereof. The Sheriff is required then to submit to the attorney a return of service (if he is successful) or a return of non-service (if he is unsuccessful).

Rule 9 of the Magistrate's Court, and Rule 4(1)(a) of the High Court, make provision for the methods of service. These include

- personal Service;
- service upon an agent;
- service on another at the residence or place of business of the defendant;
- service at the defendant's place of employment;
- service at the defendant's domicilium citandi et executandi;
- service by affixing; and
- service via registered post (which applies only to the Magistrate's Court).

Where a party is unable to serve in any of the following conventional ways, the Magistrate's and High Court rules make provision for service via substituted service and edictal citation. The former is where the instituting party applies to the court to grant some other form of service: for example, via newspaper. The latter is frequently used in service of process on a defendant who is resident outside the Republic.

===== Default judgment =====
Once the summons, with all annexures, has been served on the defendant, and the required time period for a response has lapsed without such a response, a party can apply for judgment. This is judgment on the basis that the defendant is in default. Default judgment is entered or given in the absence of the party against whom it is made. It frequently occurs when a defendant has failed to file his notice of intention to defend, but it can also be entered against the plaintiff. In terms of the rules, default judgment is granted in the following circumstances:

- when there is a failure to deliver a notice of intention to defend at all;
- when there is a failure to deliver a notice of intention to defend timeously;
- when the notice of intention to defend, although delivered, is defective; and
- when there is a failure to deliver a plea timeously or at all.

The consequences of each depend on which of the above circumstances applies:

- In the case of a failure to deliver a notice of intention to defend at all, the plaintiff will only be granted his request for default judgment where the summons is in order and there has been proper service.
- Magistrates' Courts Rule 13(5) provides that a late notice of intention to defend will still be effective provided that it is sent before default judgment has been granted. If the notice is sent before judgment is granted, but after request for default judgment has been lodged, the plaintiff is entitled to costs. Rule 19 (5) of the Uniform Rules of court provides for costs to be awarded in a similar situation.
- As regards delivery of a defective notice of intention to defend, Rule 12(2)(a) sets out the meaning of the term "defective." In this case, the plaintiff is required to give the defendant a chance to rectify the defect within five days, failing which default judgment will not be granted.
- As for failure to deliver a plea timeously or at all, there are several circumstances under which a defendant can be in default of a plea. In such case Magistrates' Courts rule 12(1)(b) and High Court rule 31(5)(a) require that the plaintiff afford the defendant a chance to do so by delivering a notice calling on the defendant to file his plea; otherwise he will be barred. This document is called a notice of bar.

A request for default judgment must be in writing and lodged with the clerk or registrar of the court. The request is sent to the registrar. If the defendant has not filed an appearance to defend, there is no need to send a copy of this request to the defendant. A request thus consists of the following documents:

- a request for default judgment;
- the original summons; and
- a return of service.

The request must set out that the papers are in order as well as the grounds on which the request is being brought.

Ordinarily a default judgment may be granted administratively. This means the clerk or registrar is permitted to grant the judgment, provided that the papers are in order. In matters where the claim is not for a debt or a liquidated demand, default judgment can only be obtained after either giving oral evidence before court or providing same by way of affidavit. When faced with a request, a magistrate or clerk can do one of the following:

- grant judgment;
- refuse judgment;
- call for evidence;
- make any other order as he deems fit.

===== Notice of intention to defend =====
If the defendant decides to oppose the action as set out in the summons, he is required to deliver a notice setting out his intention within ten days of receipt of the summons (or twenty days in the case of the state).

The document sets out the defendant's intention to defend the action, as well as the address at which he will receive all further documents in the proceedings. The appearance should indicate the physical, postal, email and fax number of the defendant, provided that the physical address is within fifteen kilometres (MC) and eight kilometres (HC) of the court house. The document must be signed by the defendant or his legal representative. The notice should also indicate the manner in which the defendant prefers all further pleadings and documents to be exchanged.

The notice is delivered to the plaintiff by either physically delivering it to his address, or via registered mail. There is no requirement to send the document through the sheriff. The word "deliver" entails that a copy of the document is served on the opposite party and the original filed with the clerk of the court. In the event of a notice to defend being filed, a plaintiff may, under certain circumstances, file an application for summary judgment.

===== Further particulars =====
Prior to the amendment of the MC rules, Rules 15 and 16 made provision for a defendant, requesting further particulars to the cause of action, to clarify any issues in the particulars of claim to plead to the case before him. This rule has now been removed and replaced with one which deals with proving a declaration and further particulars for the purposes of a trial. The High Court rule was also removed many years ago.

===== Declaration =====
Should a plaintiff elect to issue a simple summons (HC) or ordinary summons (MC), and the defendant decides to defend the matter by filing his notice of intention to defend, the plaintiff is then obliged to file a declaration.

The declaration is similar to the particulars of claim filed in a combined summons and must therefore contain all the essential averments of the cause of action. It will set out in detail the nature of the claim, the conclusions of law that the plaintiff is entitled to make from the facts, and a prayer setting out the relief to be claimed. If the plaintiff's claim consists of a number of claims, each claim should be dealt with separately in the details referred to above.

Rule 15(1) instructs a plaintiff to deliver the declaration within fifteen days of the date of the receipt of the notice of intention to defend. Should the plaintiff fail to do so, a defendant may, in writing, request the plaintiff to deliver such declaration within five days. Should the plaintiff fail to deliver the declaration, the defendant may set the action down for hearing on a further day days' notice to the plaintiff; in the event of the plaintiff's being in default to rectify his default or to appear on the date, the defendant may apply for absolution of the instance or judgment.

===== Defence =====
Where a defendant is faced with a summons, he has two choices—either

1. to defend on a substantive basis by raising an objection to the merits of the case; or
2. to defend on a technical basis by objecting to the form and manner of the summons.

Where a defence is on the merits, the defendant files a plea; where the defence is on a technicality, the defendant either files an exception or an application to strike out.

===== Exception =====
Previously, a defendant in the MC filed an exception where he wished to raise an objection based on one of the following listed grounds:

- Summons does not disclose a cause of action.
- Summons is vague and embarrassing.
- The pleading does not comply with the rules of court.
- Summons has not been properly served.
- The copy of the summons served on the defendant differs substantially from the original.

All of the above are technical aspects of the summons that are apparent ex facie (on the face of) the document. The amended MC rules only make provision for exception on the first two grounds. This is brought in line with the HC rules, which provide for exception on the first two grounds. The rationale of the exception is that a defendant cannot be expected to file his defence if he is prejudiced somehow. The aim of the exception is thus to have the summons dismissed and do away with the action in its entirety.

The exception must be raised within 10 days of receipt of the notice of intention to defend.

The exception is taken by way of a notice of motion without an affidavit. It sets out the basis of the exception, as exactly which aspect of the summons that the exception is levelled against as well as the grounds for the exception. Where the exception is taken on the grounds that the summons is vague and embarrassing, the defendant is required to state that he has given the plaintiff a chance to rectify the cause of complaint. A prayer appears at the end of the notice of exception in which the defendant requests the court to uphold the exception and dismiss the claim.

If an exception is not raised timeously, the defendant may not raise it at a later stage unless he has the leave of the court. The exception may not generally be raised during the trial. Once the notice of exception has been filed on the plaintiff, the exception has to be enrolled for hearing. This is usually done on ten days' notice (MC) and five days' notice (HC). A formal hearing thus proceeds where the party raising the exception (the excipient) has the onus of proof. The excipient must prove not only that the summons is defective but also that he will suffer prejudice if the court does not uphold his exception.

If the exception is upheld, the plaintiff may be ordered to rectify his papers or court may dismiss the plaintiff's claim. In such a case, this only amounts to final judgment if the plaintiff does not then apply for leave to amend his papers. If the court dismisses the exception, the defendant is then required to file his plea within ten days.

There is a difference between a special plea and an exception.

===== Application to strike out =====
The second ground on which an objection can be levelled against a summons is the application to strike out. Previously in the MC, a defendant raised this defence on three grounds:

- The pleading contained averments that were mutually inconsistent and had not been made in the alternative.
- The pleading contained averments that were argumentative, irrelevant and superfluous in nature.
- The pleading contained contradictory matter.

This section has now been brought in line with the HC rules, which provide for an application to strike out to be brought on the following grounds:

- The pleading contains statements that are scandalous, vexatious or irrelevant.
- The applicant will be prejudiced in the conduct of his claim or defence if the offending statements are not struck out.

The aim of the application is to delete the offending portions of the pleading.

The form of the notice of application to strike out is very similar to the notice of exception. The notice points out the grounds on which the application is being made as well the exact section or sections of the pleading against which the application is being brought. The application is then heard in the same way as the exception.

===== Plea =====
One way of defending oneself against a claim is to give one's own version of events. This is called the plea. It is the document in which the defendant answers the allegations raised by the plaintiff.

The plea is generally delivered within twenty days after delivery of the notice of intention to defend. It is also delivered in other circumstances.

In terms of MC Rule 17 and HC Rule 22, when drafting a plea a party must answer every material allegation. Where a party does not deal directly with an allegation, it will be deemed to be admitted. In the plea, a party must

- admit the allegations;
- deny the allegations; or
- confess and avoid the allegations.

The plea is contained in one document.

===== Special plea =====
Where a party wishes to raise some technical defect about the summons, this is done by filing either an exception or an application to strike out. These defects are those which are apparent on the face of the pleading. A party may, however, wish to raise an objection based on a defect that does not appear from the face of the pleadings, in which case he will raise a special plea.

A special plea may be raised on the following listed grounds:

- prescription;
- lack of jurisdiction;
- lis pendens;
- locus standi;
- res judicata;
- settlement;
- arbitration;
- costs in a previous suit between the same parties still outstanding; and
- non-joinder and misjoinder.

Where a party fails to raise the above issues, the court assumes that the party condones the other party's failures in those respects.

The plea (usually referred to as the plea over the merits) and the special plea appear in the same document. Although a successful special plea has the effect of dismissing the action, it is not frequently set down before the trial. On the trial date, the court will simply deal with the special plea before it proceeds to the plea on the merits.

There is no specific reference to a special plea in either the MC rules or the HC rules. It is well established in South African law, though.

===== Counterclaim =====
In a plea, a party simply answers the allegations raised by the plaintiff. It frequently occurs, however, that the defendant has a counterclaim. The rules provide that a party may file a counterclaim against the plaintiff. A counterclaim is often called a claim in reconvention. The same rules apply as those in the claim in convention. The plea and counterclaim are set out in the same document or in two separate documents, filed and served at the same time.

===== Replication and the plea in reconvention =====
After a defendant has filed a plea, the plaintiff may file a replication (or reply) if he wishes to plead new facts in answer to a defendant's plea. If the plaintiff merely denies everything stated by the defendant in his plea, no reply is necessary.

If a defendant filed a claim in reconvention (called a counterclaim), the plaintiff will be obliged to file a plea to such a counterclaim, which is similar to the defendant's plea to the claim in convention (the plaintiff's claim).

===== Close of pleadings =====
Rule 21 (MC) indicates specifically when pleadings are considered closed. This is called litis contestatio, and it means that the litigants have reached finality in regard to all the allegations of fact forming the basis of the claim and defence. Once the pleadings are closed, a plaintiff or defendant may apply for a trial date.

==== Procedures After Pleading are closed ====
===== Pre-trial pleadings =====
Various documents are exchanged before the matter is ready to proceed to trial. The three most important are

- the discovery of documents;
- the pre-trial conference; and
- further particulars for the purpose of the trial.

Rule 23 (MC) and Rule 35 (HC) deal with the discovery of documents. Both are substantial and indicative of the importance of this step prior to proceeding to trial.

Both plaintiff and defendant will normally provide each other with a request to discover. This notice will contain portions consisting of Rule 23 (1), (6) and (11) of the MC, and Rule 35 of the HC. It requests either party to discover—that is, set out in a list—all the documents, correspondence, etc., which they have available, and to make these items available to the other party. A party receiving such a request must respond by filing a discovery affidavit within a certain period. On receipt thereof, the receiving party may request copies of any or all documents listed therein.

The purpose of discovery is to ensure that an opponent is not caught by surprise at trial. Any document not discovered may normally not be used at trial unless by consent or on application to court.

While the issues will have been resolved, to a large extent, prior to the close of pleadings, it may be possible to reach consensus on some further issues that were placed in dispute before the close of pleadings or were not dealt with in the pleadings. This is normally done at a pre trial conference.

Rule 25 (MC) and Rule 37 (HC) deal with this question. Rule 37 lists the issues that should be raised at the conference:

- the date, place and duration of the conference;
- any prejudice;
- the settlement proposals;
- any aspect to be referred to mediation, etc.;
- transfer to another court;
- issues in terms of rule 33(4);
- admissions;
- duty to begin;
- agreement regarding producing proof by affidavit;
- who is responsible for the copy and preparation of documents; and
- documents to be utilised as evidence without duty to prove.

Although it is generally thought to be advisable that all these aspects be covered in a pre-trial conference in the magistrate's court, the rule does not specify this.

The pre-trial conference is normally attended by the parties' legal representatives. In some courts, the registrar will refuse to award a trial date until the pre-trial conference has been held. While many legal representatives do not take this rule seriously, and merely go through the formalities so as to move to the trial date, this is not recommended.

The old Rule 15 and 16 (MC) dealt with the obtaining of further particulars before pleading to the plaintiff's case. Because this rule has been removed, a defendant no longer has the benefit of asking questions to clarify certain aspects of the plaintiff's claim at this early stage of the case. The new Rule 16 (MC) and Rule 21 (HC) have been introduced to assist with this.

In terms of Rule 16(2), a party may ask only such further particulars as are strictly necessary to prepare for trial. This must be done at least twenty days before trial. Should a party fail to deliver such particulars timeously or sufficiently, the party so requesting may apply to court

- for their delivery;
- for the dismissal of the action; or

to strike out the defence.

The question of an award for costs, because of unnecessary use of the rule, is also considered.

This is, for various reasons, an important tool. It is recommended that the request be drafted as long as possible before the trial, as failure to comply may result in various interlocutory applications, which may take time. Every effort must be taken to ensure that all these procedures are completed well before the trial date, as a postponement of the trial could have disastrous consequences for both parties.

Once the process of pleading is completed, the action goes to trial.

==== Variation and rescission of judgment ====
Normally, once the court has given a final order or judgment, the matter is closed. The original court may not revisit the matter; it is functus officio. Under certain exceptional circumstances, however, a court may alter or cancel its judgment.

===== High Court =====
Judgments may be varied in two ways in the High Courts:

- in terms of their common law; or
- in terms of rule 42 of the High Courts Rules.

The High Courts have authority at common law to "supplement, clarify or correct" their own judgments. This would seem to overlap with their inherent jurisdiction to regulate their own proceedings in the interests of justice. Using this power, they have varied their judgments

- to include accessory or consequential matters that the court overlooked or failed to grant;
- to clarify obscurities or ambiguities or uncertainties in the judgment (although it may not in so doing alter the substance of the judgment or the material findings or outcome of the case);
- to correct clerical or arithmetical or other errors; and
- to correct, alter or supplement a costs order.

Rule 42(1) supplements the common law by providing for certain instances in which the court may, either mero motu or on application by one of the parties, set aside or vary one of its judgments or orders. The element that is more or less common to all the instances of variation or rescission under this rule is that of error. The rule provides for variation in the following instances:

- in respect of an order or judgment granted erroneously in the absence of an affected party (as often happens, for example, with default judgments);
- in respect of an ambiguity or patent error or omission; and
- in respect of an order or judgment granted as a result of a mistake common to the parties.

Default judgment may be rescinded in the High Court in the following ways:

- in terms of the common law in the case of
  - fraud;
  - justus error;
  - the discovery of new documents; and
  - default judgment (if sufficient cause is shown);
- in terms of rule 42(1) (just discussed), when there has been an error of some kind; and
- in terms of rule 31(2)(b), in respect of default judgments on unliquidated claims in terms of rule 31(2)(a).

Default judgments on liquidated claims must be rescinded in terms either of the common law or of rule 42(1).

===== Magistrate's Court =====
Section 36 of the Magistrate's Court Act refers to the "rescission" of a judgment. The expression 'setting aside' of a judgment is, however, often encountered as a synonym and is well established in practice. Rescission of a judgment is in issue not only in cases in which default judgment has been granted, but also in cases in which application is made for the rescission of a summary judgment, as well as in cases in which judgment has been granted in the absence of a defendant in terms of rule 60(3), where the defendant has not supplied further particulars requested of him.

Section 36 is similar to High Court rule 42(1), providing that the court may, on application, rescind or vary

- any judgment it has granted in the absence of the person against whom it was granted;
- any judgment it has granted which was void ab initio or obtained by fraud or mistake common to the parties; and
- any judgment in respect of which no appeal lies.

While it may not do any of the above in the absence of an application from any person affected by the judgment, it may, mero motu, correct patent errors in any judgment in respect of which no appeal is pending. If a plaintiff in whose favour a default judgment has been granted has agreed in writing that the judgment be rescinded or varied, a court must rescind or vary such judgment on application by any person affected by it.

It does not matter, therefore, whether a default judgment has been obtained as a result of the failure of the defendant to enter appearance to defend, or as a result of the failure of the defendant to plead.

Rule 49 was the subject of extensive amendment in 1997. Earlier cases must be used with caution in the interpretation of the new rule. In certain important respects, the new rule appears to revise the position as set out in the old cases.

Apart from applications for the rescission of default judgments, the procedure by means of which a party will make an application for the rescission or variation of a judgment in the Magistrates' Courts is set out in rule 49(7), which requires that such applications be

- brought on notice to all parties; and
- supported by an affidavit or affidavits setting out the grounds on which the applicant seeks rescission or variation.

If the rescission or variation is sought on the ground that the judgment is void ab origine, or was obtained by fraud or mistake, rule 49(8) provides that the application must be served and filed within one year after the applicant first had knowledge of such voidness, fraud or mistake.

The most common type of application for rescission, however, is an application for rescission of a default judgment.

In terms of rule 49(1), a party seeking to rescind or vary a default judgment has twenty court days, from the date on which the judgment came to his knowledge, to serve and file the application for rescission. Rule 49(2) provides that an applicant is presumed to have had knowledge of the default judgment ten days after the date on which it was granted, unless the applicant proves otherwise. This sub-rule places an onus on the applicant to rebut the presumption and to prove that he has brought the application within the twenty-day period.

Notice of the application must be given to all parties to the proceedings. The defendant is required to show good cause why the judgment should be rescinded; alternatively, the court must be satisfied that there is good reason to do so. The court has a discretion in this regard.

The application may be made by any party, or any person affected thereby. The applicant is not necessarily the defendant in default. It may be, for instance, that there has been non-joinder. A person may seek to set aside the judgment because he is materially affected by it.

The rule appears to lay down two different but related grounds upon which a court may grant rescission. The first is "upon good cause shown;" the second is "if it is satisfied that there is good reason to do so."

====== Good cause ======
"Good cause" has never been properly defined, but it incorporates both an investigation into the existence of a prima facie defence, and whether or not the defendant was in wilful default. In the cases on the previous rule, "good cause" was held to include

- a reasonable explanation for the default;
- the existence of a bona fide defence; and
- evidence that the application is made bona fide.

The first two of these requirements are set out in the new rule 49(3), which provides that the application must be supported by an affidavit setting out the reasons for the defendant's absence or default, and the grounds of the defendant's defence to the claim. It has been argued that "the previous case law still applies in regard to this sub-rule, since 'good cause' would only be shown if the explanation was reasonable, and the defence bona fide."

The requirement of absence of wilful default has become more problematic. Rule 49(4) deals with the situation in which a defendant wishes to rescind the judgment when he does not wish to proceed with the proceedings: that is, when he is prepared to make arrangements to satisfy the judgment. It is in these circumstances that the new sub-rule requires an applicant to show that he or she was not in wilful default and that the judgment was satisfied, or arrangements were made to satisfy the judgment, within a reasonable time after it came to his or her knowledge. "Does this mean," asks Torquil Paterson,

that it is only in these circumstances that the absence of wilful default is a requirement? This matter appears still to be moot. It is submitted that the absence of wilful default applies to all applications, and that it still remains part of demonstrating "good cause."

It is also submitted that in the circumstances of rule 49(4) the onus of demonstrating the absence of wilful default will rest on the applicant.

With regard to the previous rule, it was held that the onus of demonstrating that the applicant was in wilful default rested on the respondent: "Whether this is still the case appears to be moot."

Generally, then, rescission may not be granted if the defendant

- is in wilful default; and
- cannot show a prima facie defence.

This means that, to show good cause, the defendant in his affidavit must explain the reasons for his absence or default and show the existence of a prima facie defence as well as satisfy the court that his default was not wilful.

====== Good reason ======
The second possibility is that the applicant may show that there is "good reason" to rescind the judgment. The court may rescind the judgment, that is, "if it is satisfied that there is good reason to do so." Paterson writes that,

while this requirement overlaps with that of 'good cause,' it should be given an independent meaning. It is submitted that the 'good reason' relates to a wider discretion than that contained in good cause relating to the general equities of the situation.

The prejudice to both parties will be considered together with all the other factors set out above.

Although "good reason" appears to set a lower standard than the requirements of good cause, it has been held that it does not so much lower the requirements for the applicant as extend the discretion of the magistrate. Where the applicant fails to show good cause, the magistrate may nevertheless grant rescission mero motu, in the interests of justice, if exceptional circumstances warrant it.

A magistrate has a discretion in the case of rescission, and is not obliged to grant it. The defendant's bona fides, whether or not the default was wilful, and the existence of a prima facie defence are all taken into account in exercising that discretion, the most important aspect being that of the existence of a prima fade defence.

====== Situations ======
Four different situations may arise:

1. The defendant is bringing the application to rescind the default judgment and wants to defend the matter. This is the most common situation. It may occur, for instance, that for some reason, the defendant did not receive the summons. The next thing he knew the sheriff was at his door telling him that judgment had been taken against him. He consults an attorney, telling him that he has a good defence to the matter and would definitely have entered an appearance to defend if he had known about the summons. In this case the application must be supported by an affidavit, in which must be set out the reasons for the defendant's absence or default. This is where the defendant deals with the aspect of wilful default. The defendant sets out facts to show why he is in default, and must show that the default was not wilful. If any of the three elements discussed previously are absent, the defendant cannot beheld to be in wilful default. The onus of proving wilfulness is on the respondent in the application. The affidavit must also set out the grounds of the defendant's defence to the claim. This is perhaps the most important part of the affidavit. The defendant must set forth allegations of fact which give rise to a defence. He need not deal fully with the merits, but sufficient facts must be alleged to show that a prima facie case exists.
2. The defendant is bringing the application to rescind the default judgment, but does not wish to defend the proceedings. This happens where the defendant would have been happy to pay if he had known about he summons. As soon as he finds out about the judgment he makes arrangements to pay, but by that time he already has a judgment against his name. He now wants to remove the judgment. There is no need to show good cause in this situation, but the defendant must satisfy the court that he was not in wilful default, and that the judgment was satisfied or arrangements were made to satisfy the judgment within a reasonable time after it came to his knowledge.
3. The plaintiff agrees in writing that the default judgment be rescinded or varied. This will usually be the case where the defendant has paid off the judgment debt and now wants the judgment rescinded so that he can take his name off the list of judgment debtors that credit bureaus might have. As long as a debtor's name appears on the list, he will find it difficult to obtain credit. Either the plaintiff, the defendant or any other person affected by such judgment may make the request for rescission or variation. Note that, until a 2010 amendment to rule 49(5), this was not an official application to court, but a request which would have been dealt with administratively by the court. The rule has now been amended to align with section 36(2) of the Magistrates' Courts Act, with the result that the word "request" has been replaced with the word "apply." It would therefore seem that the correct procedure is by way of application, rather than a notice dealt with in chambers. In terms of rule 49(5)(b), an application of this nature may be made at any time after the plaintiff has agreed in writing to the rescission or variation of the judgment. Notice of the application must be given to all parties. Written proof of the plaintiff's consent to the rescission must accompany the application.
4. The application for rescission of the default judgment is being made by a person other than those referred to in 1, 2 or 3 above. This is a catch-all clause for rescission of default judgments. The application must be supported by affidavit, and set out the reasons why the applicant seeks rescission of the default judgment.

===== Summary of rescission of default judgment =====
In the High Court, the defendant, seeking rescission of a default judgment,

- must not be in wilful default; and
- must have a bona fide defence with a prima facie prospect of success.

In the Magistrate's Court, rescission of a default judgment will be granted

- if there is good reason; or
- on good cause shown.

Rescission is not available in respect of provisional sentences or summary judgments.

=== Applications ===
Application proceedings, also known as motion proceedings, are based on the exchange of affidavits. The party bringing the application is known as the applicant; the party opposing the application, if any, is known as the respondent. In application proceedings, the equivalent documents to pleadings are called "processes"; these processes not only formulate the factual dispute but also offer the evidence in support of the factual allegations. Processes are drafted in the form of affidavits, which are written statements sworn under oath or affirmation, and may have extra documents attached as annexures, which further support the evidence adduced.

In contrast to summons proceedings, there is no distinction between the pleading stage and the trial stage in application proceedings. In essence, application procedure condenses the action process; the pleadings as well as the evidence are contained in the applications papers which go before the court. Application procedure is therefore reserved for matters in which the court can reach a decision on the documents before it, without resorting to the oral evidence of witnesses because the parties do not dispute the material facts of the case.

==== Form ====
An application will generally consist of

- a notice of motion; and
- one or more supporting affidavits.

===== Notice of motion =====
The notice of motion must be in general accordance with Form 2(a) of the First Schedule to the Rules. This form is often referred to as the "long-form notice of motion".

It serves to inform the court and the respondent that a specific type of application will be made on a specified date, at a specified time at a specified court, and that the legal relief mentioned therein will be requested.

===== Affidavit =====
The purpose of an affidavit is to record certain facts under oath, which the court will then consider in determining whether or not to grant the application.

There is no standard form prescribed for the affidavit. Its contents will vary widely, depending on Motion court the nature of the specific application.

There are certain basic principles which apply to all affidavits. The following information should appear in all supporting affidavits:

- the names and addresses of the applicant and the respondent;
- the fact that the applicant has locus standi;
- the fact that the court has jurisdiction;
- the material facts on which the claim is based (facta probanda), as well as the evidence which the deponent wishes to place before the court (facta probantia); and
- a request to the court to grant the relief as prayed for in the notice of motion.

The affidavit is framed in the first person. The deponent will generally state that its contents are true.

If the applicant refers to documentary evidence in the supporting affidavit, such documents must be attached to the affidavit. Being a document containing evidence, the substantive law of evidence applies as much to an affidavit as to viva voce evidence.

Where the applicant refers in the supporting affidavit to communications by other persons, such reference must be affirmed by obtaining confirmatory affidavits from the said persons, and attaching it to the supporting affidavit. Such attachment is necessary in order to comply with the evidentiary rule against hearsay. Only admissible evidence should be contained in the affidavit.

==== Procedure ====
The applicant commences proceedings by issuing a notice of motion, which serves to advise the respondent of the applicant's claim and the relief which the applicant seeks. The notice of motion is usually accompanied by a founding affidavit. Sometimes one or more supporting affidavits or relevant documentation are attached to the affidavit.

If the application is not opposed, the facts, as set out in the documents, are accepted. The only question that must be answered then is whether a case can be made for granting the requested order.

The respondent who wishes to oppose the application must deliver an opposing affidavit (or answering affidavit) in which he answers the allegations of fact contained in the founding affidavit.

If necessary, the applicant may then deliver a replying affidavit, in order to address and respond to any allegations contained in the opposing affidavit.

Affidavits consist not only of the applicant's affidavit but also of the supporting affidavits of witnesses, and set out the facts of the claim, defence, and all supporting evidence. These are all in the possession of the motion court when the case appears before it. Consequently, on the date of the hearing of the application, the parties' legal representatives argue "on the papers". Only in exceptional cases will oral evidence be heard.

Magistrates' Courts do not provide for a general application procedure, and only recognise specific instances in which applications may be brought. In the High Court, however, the application procedure is widely used.

==== High Court ====
===== General rule =====
In any claim, the decision to be made up front is whether to proceed by way of action or application procedure. In Room Hire v Jeppe Street Mansions, it was decided that, as a general rule, the choice between the procedures depends on whether a bona fide material dispute of fact should have been anticipated by the party launching the proceedings.

When such a dispute is anticipated, a trial action should be instituted; otherwise motion proceedings are permissible in order to avoid the delay and expense involved in trials.

It follows, from this general rule, that motion proceedings should not be instituted in respect of

- unliquidated claims;
- matters in which it is anticipated that a material dispute of fact will arise; or
- claims for divorce.

Notwithstanding the rule regarding anticipated disputes of fact, there are certain types of proceeding in which applications should always be used:

- insolvency proceedings;
- where a party seeks urgent relief; or
- where legislation so dictates.

Between these two extremes, the party suing has the choice between an action and an application; his only limitation in regard to an application is the anticipation of a real dispute on any material question of fact.

This principle is valid only for an application for final relief (such as an application for the payment of money, or for the vindication of an article) or for a final interdict.

The party suing (the applicant) is dominus litis; he chooses the procedure to be used. It must be appreciated that it is inherently unfair on the respondent to be brought to court in an application

- where there are disputes of fact;
- when he has the prospect of a final judgment being granted against him; and
- when he does not have the opportunity of giving viva voce evidence before a judge who is trained in the art of evaluating that evidence and observing his demeanour.

===== Disputes of fact =====
According to the Room Hire case, a dispute of fact might arise in the following situations:

- where the respondent denies all the material allegations made by the various deponents on behalf of the applicant, and furnishes positive evidence by deponents or witnesses to the contrary;
- "confession and avoidance," where the respondent admits the allegations (or evidence) in the applicant's founding or supporting affidavit, but raises other facts which in turn are denied by the applicant;
- where the respondent concedes that he has no knowledge of the main facts alleged by the applicant, but denies them and orders the applicant to the proof thereof, and furnishes (or undertakes to furnish) evidence to indicate that the applicant or the applicant's deponents are prejudiced, incredible or otherwise unreliable, and that certain facts upon which the applicant or the deponents rely to prove the main facts are also unreliable; or
- where the respondent states that he can lead no evidence himself, or by others, to dispute the truth of the applicant's allegations, but puts the applicant to the proof thereof by oral evidence subject to cross-examination.

===== Resolving a dispute of fact =====
Bearing in mind the disadvantage to which the respondent is put in an application for final relief, a court is not permitted, where there are genuine disputes of fact on material issues, to decide the matter on a mere balance of probabilities, as would be done in an action. The test is more stringent: The applicant will only succeed if the facts as stated by the respondent, together with those facts in the applicant's affidavit which have been admitted by the respondent, justify the order sought. The matter is therefore decided essentially on the respondent's version.

A court will not permit a respondent to defeat the applicant's application by a mere denial in general terms. In suitable cases, it will adopt a "robust, common sense approach" to disputes of fact. Where, however, the court is unable to decide the application on the papers, generally there are three avenues open to it:

1. HCR 6(5)(g) provides that, where an application cannot properly be decided on affidavit, a motion court may dismiss the application or make such an order as is necessary to ensure a just and expeditious decision.
2. The court may direct that oral evidence be heard on specified issues with a view to resolving any dispute of fact. To that end, it may order any deponent to appear personally, or grant leave for the deponent or any witness.
3. It may refer the matter to trial with appropriate directions as to pleadings or the definition of issues.

====== Dismissal of the application ======
If it appears that the applicant must reasonably have foreseen that a material dispute of fact would arise at the time the application was brought, but the applicant nevertheless proceeded by way of application, the court may dismiss the application with costs. This is perhaps the most drastic course of action open to the court.

Even in such a circumstance, the court is not obliged to dismiss the application. It has a discretion to decide on one of the other steps mentioned below, and in addition to penalise the applicant with a costs order.

====== Presentation of oral evidence ======
In terms of HCR 6(5)(g), the court may order that oral evidence be heard to decide a specific factual dispute. This procedure is applicable only where the dispute is of limited or narrow scope, not where it is extensive and complicated.

If the court is of the opinion that it is proper to hear oral evidence in terms of HCR 6(5)(g), the court may determine which persons to call as witnesses; it may also determine the issues in respect of which oral evidence must be presented. Apart from calling the deponents of the affidavits to give oral evidence, the court may also order that any other person be called as a witness.

====== Referral to trial ======
If the factual dispute is extensive or complicated, the court may refer the matter to trial. The result is that the application is converted into a trial action, where oral evidence may be led.

The court may give such direction regarding the pleadings and the determination of the issues as it deems proper. For example, the court may order that the notice of motion serve as a summons, and that other pleadings be delivered. The matter will proceed as if it had been started as an action.

The affidavits here will play no role in the ultimate decision, other than perhaps with regard to credibility. The customary order made when referring an application to trial would typically read as follows:

1. The application is referred to trial.
2. The notice of motion shall stand as a simple summons.
3. The notice of intention to oppose shall stand as a notice of intention to defend.
4. The applicant shall deliver a declaration within twenty days of this order.
5. Thereafter the rules relating to actions shall apply.
6. The costs to date shall be reserved for determination by the trial court (or shall be paid by the applicant).

===== Notice to respondent =====
It is a fundamental policy that the respondent ought to be afforded the opportunity of placing his version before the court, and of being heard. Therefore, unless there are exceptional circumstances, the notice of motion and the founding affidavit (together with all annexures) must be served on the respondent in the manner provided for in the Rules.

There are exceptions to this general rule.

==== Exceptions to the general rules ====
===== Form of notice of motion =====
====== Petitions ======
Rule 6(1) refers to petitions; reference thereto is also to be found in legislation.

Petitions were abolished by the Petition Proceedings Replacement Act. For practical purposes they exist only as the form used for applications in the Supreme Court of Appeal.

Petitions are written in the third person: "Your petitioner respectfully submits that he...”

====== Ex parte applications ======
An ex parte or unilateral application is an application in which the applicant is the only party before the court. As a rule, in fact, when only one person is before the court as a litigant, the application procedure is always appropriate, as the possibility of a dispute of fact does not exist.

The ex parte application may be used in the following cases:

- when the applicant is the only person with an interest in the case (for example, where application is made for the voluntary surrender of an insolvent estate, or for admission as an attorney or advocate);
- when the application is merely a preliminary step in the matter (for example, where application is made to sue by means of substituted service); and
- where urgent or immediate relief is required, and where notice to the respondent, and the delay which such notice may occasion, would result in prejudice to the applicant (for example, where the applicant applies to attach a vehicle in the other party's possession which the other party plans to remove from the country).

In accordance with the audi alteram partem principle, and as a general rule, justice and fairness demand that the court should not make an order against any person unless the affected person has received proper notice of the legal relief sought. The ex parte application represents a departure from this rule. The courts will examine such an application very carefully, that the interests of affected persons may be properly safeguarded.

There are two important principles for ensuring fairness to the party against whom relief is sought in terms of an ex parte application:

1. The applicant is obliged to observe the utmost good faith in placing all material facts before the court. If the court makes an order pursuant to an ex parte application, and it subsequently emerges that material facts, which might have influenced the decision of the court, were not disclosed, the court has the discretion to set the order aside on the grounds of non-disclosure. This applies irrespective of whether the failure to disclose was mala fide or negligent.
2. If another person's interests stand to be affected by an order in an ex parte application, the court will not grant a final order without giving the respondent the opportunity to present a defence. The court will merely grant a provisional order with a return date, known as a rule nisi. After the order has been provisionally granted, it is then served on the respondent. The rule nisi calls on the respondent to appear before the court on a certain date to furnish reasons for the provisional order not to be confirmed and made final. The respondent must then deliver an answering affidavit, unless the respondent relies solely on a point of law. The audi alteram partem rule is therefore complied with by affording the affected party the opportunity to state a case on the return day.

====== Interlocutory applications ======
Interlocutory applications, and other applications incidental to pending proceedings, are brought on notice (notice here does not mean "notice of motion"), usually supported by an affidavit.

Service of such an application need not be effected by the sheriff; it is usually effected by the attorney's messenger.

In practice, Form 2 is adapted for this purpose by reflecting on it both the applicant and the respondent, and by addressing it to both the Registrar and the respondent.

====== Urgent applications ======
In certain circumstances, a party may need to obtain relief on an urgent basis; proper compliance with the rules and time limits may not be possible. Consequently, HCR 6(12) provides that the court may dispense with the forms and service provided for in the rules, and may dispose of the matter at such a time and place, and in such manner and in accordance with such procedure (which shall, as far as practicable, be in terms of the rules), as it deems fit.

It is important to note that, when a matter is urgent, it will always be appropriate to proceed by way of application, at least to obtain temporary relief—even though a dispute of fact is anticipated.

Luna Meubel v Makin is the leading case on the question of how and when an urgent application may be brought. The court highlighted the requirement in HCR 6(12)(a) that the procedure for an urgent application must, as far as practicable, comply with the rules.

The court found that HCR 6(12) does not permit practitioners to select any day of the week, or any time of the day (or night), to demand a hearing. Urgency involves

1. primarily, the abridgement of time periods prescribed by the rules; and,
2. secondarily, the departure from established filing and sitting times of the court.

The court held that the following factors, listed in ascending order of urgency, must be borne in mind:

- When the matter is too urgent for the respondent to be allowed the usual ten court days prescribed by HCR 6(5)(b), from date of service of notice of the application to date of hearing, the ten-day period may be ignored. The application must still be set down for hearing on a motion day; the papers must still be filed with the registrar of the court sufficiently early for it to come onto the following week's motion roll.
- Only if the matter is so urgent that the applicant cannot set the matter down for hearing on the court's weekly motion day, and give the registrar the prescribed period of notice of the hearing, may the applicant set the matter down for hearing on the next motion day while giving the registrar a shorter period of notice.
- The matter may be set down for hearing on the next court day only if the urgency is such that the applicant dare not wait even for the next motion day. It must be set down at the normal time of 10:00, or for the same day if the court has not yet adjourned.
- Only if, once the court has adjourned for the day, the applicant cannot possibly wait for the hearing until the next court day, at the normal time at which the court sits, may the matter be set down forthwith for hearing at any reasonably convenient time, in consultation with the registrar—even if that is at night or during a weekend.

The court explained that practitioners should carefully analyse the facts of each case to determine, for the purposes of setting the case down for hearing, whether a greater or lesser degree of relaxation of the rules is required. The degree of relaxation should not be greater than the exigency of the case demands; it must be commensurate therewith. The applicant must make out a case in the founding affidavit to justify the particular extent of the departure from the norm.

===== Application notwithstanding existence of factual dispute =====
Notwithstanding a factual dispute, foreseen or foreseeable, the situation may demand that the applicant be afforded urgent relief in the face of a factual dispute.

For example, an applicant whose life is threatened may approach a court for an interim interdict restraining the respondent from assaulting him, despite the fact that the applicant foresees that the respondent in an answering affidavit will deny having made the threat.

The relief sought in such a case is not final, but merely interim. It may be corrected or reversed at a later stage, and is invariably granted pendente lite. For this reason, the test is not as stringent as when final relief is sought; in fact, it favours the applicant.

There are other examples of applications which do not claim final relief, such as applications for rescission and provisional sentence.

It is not, then, for every case in which a factual dispute arises that motion proceedings are excluded.

===== Notice and service =====
Although the general rule requires that notice of an application be given to the respondent, there may be exceptional circumstances where notice will thwart the object of the application.

An applicant may contend, for example, that the respondent is in wrongful possession of the applicant's motor vehicle, and has threatened to destroy it in the event of the applicant's proceeding to court for its recovery. In such a case, the applicant would contend that, having received notice of the application, the respondent might very well destroy or dispose of the vehicle without a trace, prior to the applicant's obtaining an order from the court for the return of the vehicle. The applicant will accordingly seek an order on an interim basis, directing that, pending the determination of the application, the vehicle be preserved.

There are instances, then, where the circumstances may justify the court in dispensing with service.

==== Appointment of curator ====
If it is suspected that a person may be of unsound mind, and as such incapable of managing his own affairs, proceedings may be instituted for a declaration by the court to that effect, and for the appointment of curators to his person and property (curator personae). The court may also on application declare a person to be a prodigal, and appoint a curator to his estate (curator bonis).

There are three main classes or categories of persons who must be assisted by curators ad litem in actions or proceedings brought by or against them:

1. lunatics (including any persons who, by reason of mental disability or disorder, cannot manage his own affairs);
2. minors who have no guardians; and
3. interdicted or declared prodigals.

===== Persons of unsound mind =====
====== Who may institute proceedings? ======
Proceedings are initiated by application to court by any person (a relative, for example, or a guardian; in certain circumstances, a friend) who has locus standi and an interest in the matter. The State may bring an application for reimbursement of future expenses incurred in the maintenance of a person who is detained in a public asylum.

====== When application to court for appointment of a curator is unnecessary ======
If a person is incapable of managing his own affairs, and the estimated value of his property does not exceed R100,000, a judge may, on application, appoint a curator bonis.

The Administration of Estates Act lays down that the Master may, by notice published in the Gazette, call upon the relatives of the person concerned to attend before him for the purpose of recommending the appointment as curator of a person or any number of specified persons. The notice may be dispensed with if the value of the property does not exceed R5,000.

====== When court proceedings must be instituted ======
If proceedings are initiated under the Mental Health Act, application must be made to the provincial or local division of the Supreme Court with jurisdiction.

If the application is made under the common law, application may be made to the court in whose area of jurisdiction the patient was domiciled, at the time of his becoming mentally ill.

====== How proceedings must be initiated ======
Rule 57(1) provides that any person who desires to make an application to the court for an order declaring another person ("the patient") to be of an unsound mind, and as such incapable of managing his own affairs, and appointing a curator to the person or property of the patient, must in the first instance apply to court for the appointment of a curator ad litem to the patient.

The rule shows clearly that the appointment of such curator is aimed at a declaratory order. It is the request for this order which distinguishes the procedure from that under the common law, where the person concerned suffers from a physical disability only.

An application to court for the appointment of a curator ad litem to a patient must be brought ex parte, and must set forth fully

- the grounds on which the applicant claims locus standi to make the application;
- the grounds on which the court is alleged to have jurisdiction;
- the patient's age and sex, full particulars of his means, and information as to his general state of physical health;
- the relationship (if any) between the patient and the application, and the duration and intimacy of their association (if any);
- the facts and circumstances relied upon to show that the patient is of unsound mind and incapable of managing his affairs; and
- the name, occupation and address of the respective persons suggested as curators to the patient's person and/or property, and a statement that these persons have been approached and have intimated that, if appointed, they would be willing to act in those capacities.

The application must, as far as possible, be supported by the following:

1. There must be an affidavit by at least one person to whom the patient is well-known, containing such facts and information as are within the deponent's own knowledge concerning the patient's mental condition. If the deponent is related to the patient or has any personal interest in the terms of any order sought, full details of that relationship or interest must be set forth in the affidavit.
2. There must be affidavits by at least two medical practitioners, one of whom must be an alienist, who have conducted recent examinations of the patient with a view to ascertaining and reporting on his mental condition. The affidavits must state all the facts observed by their opinions in regard to the nature, extent, and probable duration of any mental disorder or defect so observed, and their reasons for those opinions; and whether or not the patient is in their opinion incapable of managing his affairs. The medical practitioners must, as far as possible, be persons unrelated to the patient, and without any personal interest in the terms of any order sought.

== Post-litigation ==
Even though the trial has by now run its course, the dispute is not yet resolved. There are two outstanding issues still to be decided: firstly, the question of enforcement and then that of costs. The legal representatives may still need to execute on the judgment, either by serving documents via the sheriff or by managing the logistical arrangements for payment. They must also settle the issue of the final figure of the legal costs. This involves the winning party drafting a bill of costs, which will be taxed. Only once the judgement debt and costs awarded have been settled—that is to say, paid by the losing party—can it be said that the matter is over.

=== Enforcement of judgments ===
Obtaining judgment in one's favour is not necessarily the final step in the litigation process. In many cases the party against whom the judgment is granted (the "judgment debtor") will willingly comply with the judgment by, for example, paying an amount of money or performing a specific act in accordance with the terms of the judgment. It may happen, however, that the debtor is recalcitrant and unwilling to comply with a judgment. In such a case, it will be necessary to distinguish between a judgment in terms of which the court orders the judgment debtor to perform some act, known as a judgment ad factum praestandum, and a judgment which orders the judgment debtor to pay a sum of money, known as a judgment ad pecuniam solvendam (like an order to pay damages arising out of a delict). The remedy of the creditor is to follow a process known as "execution", which is set out in specific rules of the High Court and Magistrate's Court. Such procedures provide a mechanism by which court orders may be enforced, and ensure the effectiveness and integrity of the process of judicial decision-making.

In general terms, the process of execution entails the attachment and sale by public auction, by the sheriff of the court, of the property of the judgment debtor in order to realise money and thereby satisfy a money judgment. The property may be moveable, immovable or incorporeal. This procedure amounts to an individual debt-collecting (execution) procedure, since it can operate effectively only where the debtor has sufficient assets to meet the amount of the judgment debt. If the debtor cannot pay the debt and has no executable assets, the debtor is technically insolvent. In such an instance, creditors will have to revert to other debt-collecting devices, such as an application for the sequestration of the estate of the debtor, in the case of a natural person (as provided by the Insolvency Act), or an application for the liquidation or winding-up of the judgment debtor, in the case of a juristic person (as provided by the Companies Act or the Close Corporation Act).

The following requirements must be complied with before it may be said that execution has been levied:

- the issue of a valid writ of execution;
- the attachment of the judgment debtor's property by the sheriff, unless the debtor pays the amount of the writ and costs; and
- the sale by the sheriff, through public auction, of the property attached.

An attachment of property is subject to and qualified by the recent Constitutional Court decision in Jaftha v Schoeman, which holds that the attachment process in the Magistrate's Court, specifically section 66, is unconstitutional in so far as it does not provide for judicial supervision over the attachment of immovable property.

In particular, the Constitutional Court found that any legal process or measure which removes from persons their pre-existing access to adequate housing is unconstitutional, because it limits unjustifiably the right to housing as defined in section 26(1) of the Constitution.

In order to overcome the problem, the Constitutional Court proposes a remedy based on judicial oversight of the execution process: namely, that a magistrate must carefully consider the facts of each case in order to determine (before a writ of attachment in respect to immovable property is issued in terms of section 66) whether the execution will be reasonable and justifiable in the circumstances.

In later cases, the effect of the Jaftha decision was considered with regard to execution following default judgment in terms of HCR 31(5), as well as execution of immovable property in the High Court in terms of HCR 45. With regard to HCR 31(5), the SCA held that the Registrar may continue to grant default judgment declaring specially hypothecated immovable property executable in cases where such judgment is applied for based on a debt flowing from the mortgage bond over the property.

Although a full bench of the WLD has ruled that the Jaftha case would affect HCR 45(1), and that judicial supervision of this procedure had to be read into this rule, the SCA in Standard Bank v Saunderson found it unnecessary to do so.

These decisions will influence future development of the execution process relating to residential property. The procedures described below must be read with the Constitutional Court's remedy in mind.

It is important to bear in mind that, where the formalities set out in the HCR and MCR are not complied with, ultimately the sale in execution may be void.

==== Property that may be attached in execution ====
The primary principle in execution is that it can be carried out only once judgment is granted, and then only by means of the issue of a warrant of execution. Generally execution takes place first against the defendant's movables, and thereafter against any immovable property.

==== Movable, immovable and incorporeal property ====
As a general rule, the judgment creditor is entitled to as much of the property of the judgment debtor as satisfies the judgment, plus costs. The property attached may be either movable property, immovable property or incorporeal property, although the mode of attachment of each is different.

Execution will take place first against the debtor's movables, and only thereafter against any immovable property. Therefore, where a writ against the movables of the judgment debtor is issued and served, and insufficient attachable movables are found, the writ must be re-issued against the debtor's immovable property.

Immovable property may, however, be declared to be specifically executable at the time of judgment where there is a prayer to that effect. In such a case, the immovable property may be attached in the first instance without the necessity of attempting first to execute against moveable property. This often occurs in the context of provisional-sentence proceedings.

The property must belong to the judgment debtor. In the context of movable and immovable property, this means that ownership in the property must vest in the debtor. Therefore, even in circumstances where property has been sold by the debtor to a third party, but ownership has not yet been transferred, because delivery has not yet taken place, the property will still be subject to attachment.

Where the ownership in the movable or immovable property vests in the debtor, but a third party has a real right in respect of that property, such as a pledge (in the case of movable property) or a mortgage (in the case of immovable property), as a general rule that property may nevertheless be attached and sold in execution, subject to certain conditions. The third party, however, will have a preferential right to the proceeds.

Incorporeal property, whether movable or immovable, may also be attached. Such property may take the form of a lease, a bill of exchange, a promissory note, a bond or other security for the payment of money. It may also take the form of an interest in a partnership, shares in a company, or a member's interest in a close corporation.

Any debts which are owed or accruing from a third person to the judgment debtor may be attached and executed upon by way of a garnishee order. In terms of such an order, the third person, known as the "garnishee", will be ordered to pay the debt, or part thereof, to the judgment creditor, rather than to the judgment debtor.

A specific procedure is laid down for obtaining execution in this manner. Money or bank notes, as a form of moveable property, may also be seized.

==== Property exempt from attachment and execution ====
Certain property belonging to the judgment debtor may not be attached and sold in execution. Section 39 of the Supreme Court Act, and section 67 of the Magistrates' Courts Act, which are framed in identical terms, provide that the following items are exempt from attachment and execution:

- necessary beds and bedding and wearing apparel of the person against whom execution is levied, or any member of his family;
- necessary furniture, other than beds, and household utensils, insofar as they do not exceed in value the amount determined by the Minister;
- stock, tools and agricultural implements of a farmer, insofar as they do not exceed in value the amount determined by the Minister;
- any food or drink sufficient to meet the needs of such person, and the members of his family, for one month;
- tools and implements of trade, insofar as they do not exceed in value the amount determined by the Minister;
- professional books, documents or instruments necessarily used by the debtor in his profession, insofar as they do not exceed in value the amount determined by the Minister; and
- arms and ammunition of which the debtor, in terms of any law, is required to have possession as part of his equipment.

The limit set by the minister is R2,000. The provisos to section 39 of the SCA, and section 67 of the Magistrates' Courts Act, state that the court may, in exceptional circumstances, and on such conditions as it may determine, increase this amount at its discretion.

There are certain other limitations. Section 3 of the State Liability Act provides that no execution, attachment or like process shall be issued against a State defendant or respondent in any such action or proceedings, or against any property of the State, but the amount, if any, which may be required to satisfy any judgment or order given or made against the nominal defendant or respondent in any such action or proceedings may be paid out of the National Revenue Fund.

Section 2 of the Statutory Pensions Protection Act provides that no pension, right to a pension or any contributions made by any person towards a pension, shall be liable to be attached or subjected to any form of execution under a judgment of a court. On the other hand, section 26(4) of the Maintenance Act provides (notwithstanding anything to the contrary contained in any law) that any pension, annuity, gratuity or compassionate allowance or other similar benefit shall be liable to be attached or subjected to execution under any warrant of execution.

A limitation also exists in terms of the gratuity or benefit paid under the Occupational Diseases and Mines and Works Act, and movable or immovable property purchased with such gratuity or benefit.

==== Writ or warrant of execution ====
The first step in the procedure for attachment and execution is the valid issue of a document known in the practice of the High Court as a "writ of execution", and in the Magistrate's Court as a "warrant of execution". Although the terminology is different, the purpose of the documents is essentially the same.

A writ or warrant of execution is issued by the registrar of the High Court or the clerk of the Magistrate's Court. It instructs the sheriff of the court to attach and sell, by public sale, so much of the judgment debtor's property as is necessary to satisfy the judgment debt, plus the costs of the execution process. Thereafter, it is handed to the sheriff to execute.

A writ or warrant may be issued only after judgment. It is therefore a prerequisite for the issue of a writ or warrant that there be a judgment against the debtor.

In the High Court, there does not appear to be any rule prescribing when, after judgment, a writ may be issued. It would also appear that there is no prerequisite at common law that the creditor should wait a reasonable time after judgment before issuing a writ so as to give the debtor an opportunity to satisfy the judgment.

In the Magistrate's Court, the only time requirement appears in MCR 36(7), which provides that a warrant of execution shall not be given before the day following that on which the judgment is given without leave of the court applied for at the time of granting the judgment.

===== High Court =====
In the High Court, the form of the writ of execution differs, depending on whether it pertains to movable property or to immovable property:

- HCR 45(1) provides that, where the writ pertains to movables, the writ must be as near as possible in accordance with Form 18 of the First Schedule.
- Where the writ pertains to immovable property, HCR 46(2) provides that it must be as near as possible in accordance with Form 20 of the First Schedule. The writ must contain a full description of the nature and situation, including the address, of the immovable property, to enable it to be traced and identified by the sheriff.

===== Magistrate's Court =====
MCR 36(1) provides that the process for the execution of any judgment for ejectment, the delivery of property (movable or immovable), or the payment of money, shall be by warrant issued and signed by the clerk of the court and addressed to the sheriff. Three different forms of warrant are provided for in Annexure 1. The form of the warrant depends on the type of judgment granted:

- Where the court makes an order of ejectment, the warrant will be in accordance with Annexure 1, Form 30.
- Where the court makes an order for the delivery of goods, the warrant will be in accordance with Annexure 1, Form 31.
- Where the court makes an order for the payment of money, execution shall take place against the property of the debtor; in such a case, the warrant will be in accordance with Annexure 1, Form 32.

===== Attachment and execution against movables =====
MCR 41(1)(a) provides that, upon receipt of the warrant, the sheriff must proceed to the home or place of employment of the debtor, and request satisfaction of the writ.

With regard to the attachment of the property, certain specific provisions of the rules of the Magistrates' Courts bear mention:

- The sheriff must show the original warrant to the debtor, and must leave a copy thereof on the premises. Although this is not specifically provided for in the High Court, the practice there is the same.
- Where the sheriff is in doubt as to the validity of any attachment, the sheriff may require the party suing out the process in execution to provide security in the form of indemnification. In particular, security must be granted where the judgment creditor is executing a judgment under circumstances where summons has not been served on the defendant personally, unless the defendant has entered an appearance to defend or the notice of attachment has been given to the debtor personally. The position in the High Court is different: The sheriff will attach the property. Where, however, any claim is made by another person to any property seized, the sheriff will, before taking the property into custody, request the execution creditor to provide indemnity to the sheriff's satisfaction against any loss or damage incurred as a result of the seizure. Where no indemnity is given, the sheriff may follow the interpleader proceedings set out in HCR 58. In such a case, the sheriff will have the rights of an applicant; an execution creditor will have the rights of a claimant.
- Even if the property is insufficient to satisfy the debt fully, the sheriff must nevertheless proceed to attach and make an inventory and valuation of those items in part-execution of the warrant. Although this is not specifically provided for in the High Court, the practice is the same; the sheriff will attach property even if it is insufficient to satisfy the judgment in full.
- If necessary for purposes of execution of the warrant, the sheriff may open any door on any premises, or of any piece of furniture, even if such opening is refused, and even if there is nobody present representing the judgment debtor. If necessary, the sheriff may use force for such purpose. Although this is not specifically provided for in the High Court, the practice is the same.
- As soon as the sheriff has complied with the requirements of MCR 41(1) to (3)—that is, by exhibiting the original warrant and making an inventory and valuation of the property to be attached—the inventoried goods will be deemed to have been judicially attached.
- The sheriff must hand a signed copy of the inventory to the execution debtor, or leave a copy of the inventory on the premises. The inventory must be annexed to a notice of attachment. In the High Court, the practice is not significantly different.

After attachment of the items, the sheriff must notify the execution creditor of such attachment by sending the return and the inventory to the execution creditor or his attorney. As a general rule, the sheriff must leave the movable property, other than money, specie or documents, on the premises and in the possession of the execution debtor. The property may be removed in two circumstances:

1. Where, upon issue of the warrant of execution, the execution creditor or his attorney is able to satisfy the clerk of the court of the desirability of removing the property immediately, the property may be removed. The clerk will endorse the warrant with permission for immediate removal. The attorney will then, when sending the warrant to the sheriff, also send a letter to the sheriff with instructions to remove immediately the articles to be attached.
2. Where there is no such instruction, the execution creditor or his attorney, after receiving notification of the attachment, may instruct the sheriff in writing either to remove the property to a place of security or leave it upon the premises in the charge and custody of the debtor or another person acting on the sheriff's behalf.

In the Magistrate's Court, there is no equivalent to HCR 45(5), which sets out the mechanism by which property attached and inventoried may be left on the premises if the execution debtor, together with some person of sufficient means acting as a surety, undertakes that such property will be produced on the day appointed for the sale. In the Magistrate's Court, the general rule is that property is left on the premises until the sheriff receives an instruction to remove it.

An attachment over movables is valid for four months, calculated from the date of attachment.

The execution creditor's attorney must obtain a date for sale from the sheriff. The date of the sale must be at least fifteen days after the attachment. The property must be sold at or near the place where it was attached, or to which it has been removed. The property will then be sold by the sheriff through public auction, or with the approval of the magistrate, by an auctioneer or other person so appointed by the sheriff.

Thereafter, it is the responsibility of the creditor, after consultation with the sheriff, to prepare a notice of sale, and to send two copies thereof to the sheriff, so that one copy may be affixed to the notice board or door of the court, and the other copy near the place where the sale is to take place. This must be done ten days before the sale.

If the sheriff is of the opinion that the items are worth more than R3,000, the sheriff will require the creditor to publish the notice of sale in a local newspaper. The advertisement must be published at least ten days prior to the sale. A copy of the edition of the paper wherein the advertisement is published must be furnished to the sheriff at least one day prior to the sale.

On completion of the sale, the sheriff must attach to the return a "vendue roll", showing details of the property sold, the prices realised, the names and addresses of the purchasers (where known), and an account of the distribution of the proceeds.

==== Attachment and execution against immovable property ====
In the case of immovable property, the warrant of execution must be delivered to the sheriff of the district in which the immovable property is situated. The sheriff effects the attachment by serving the notice of attachment and the warrant of execution on

- the owner of the property;
- the registrar of deeds;
- all registered holders of bonds (other than the execution creditor) registered against the property attached;
- the occupier of the property, if the property is in the occupation of some person other than the owner; and
- the local authority in whose area the property is situated.

Unlike the provision in the HCR, which requires service by registered letter addressed to the intended recipient, the MCR require service in the same manner as a summons. The sheriff will then send the original warrant of execution, together with the return of service, to the creditor's attorney.

After the attachment, the sheriff must ascertain and record whether the said property is subject to any claim preferent to that of the creditor. If that is the case, the sheriff must notify the creditor of the existence of any such claim. Having received such notification, the creditor is obliged, in terms of section 66(2) of the Magistrates' Courts Act, to cause a notice of the intended sale in execution to be served personally upon the preferent creditor; alternatively, the execution creditor must make application to the Magistrate's Court of the district in which the property is situated in order to obtain a direction as to what steps must be taken to bring the intended sale to the notice of the preferent creditor.

Section 66(2) also provides that no immovable property subject to any preferent claim shall be sold in execution unless

- the proceeds of the sale are sufficient to satisfy the claim of such preferent creditor in full; or
- the preferent creditor confirms the sale in writing, in which event the preferent creditor shall be deemed to have agreed to accept such proceeds in full settlement of his claim.

The sheriff will then set a day and a place for the sale of the property. The date of the sale must be at least a month after the service of the notice of attachment. The sale must take place in front of the courthouse in the district in which the attached property is situated, or at such place as the magistrate may determine.

The sale must be by public auction without reserve. The property must, subject to the provisions of section 66(2) of the Magistrates' Courts Act, and to the other conditions of sale, be sold to the highest bidder.

Therefore, unlike the position in the High Court, no reserve price may be stipulated, as preferent creditors are protected by the provisions of section 66(2).

It is not necessary for the property to be sold by the sheriff. The execution creditor, or any person having an interest in the proper realisation of the property, may by notice to the sheriff, within fifteen days after attachment, and subject to certain conditions, require that such property be sold by an auctioneer in the ordinary course of business, and may in such notice nominate the auctioneer to be employed.

Thereafter, it is the responsibility of the execution creditor to prepare a notice of sale and the conditions of sale. Such a notice of sale must contain

- a brief description of the property;
- its situation;
- the time and place of the sale; and
- the material conditions of sale.

Thereafter the execution creditor must publish the notice of sale in a newspaper circulating in the district in which the property is situated, as well as in the Government Gazette not less than five days, and not more than fifteen days, before the date of sale. A photocopy of each of the published notices must be furnished to the sheriff as proof of publication.

At least ten days prior to the sale, the sheriff must

- send, by registered post, a copy of the notice of sale to each judgment creditor who has caused the immovable property to be attached, and to each mortgagee whose address is known; and
- affix one copy of the notice of sale on the notice board of the Magistrate's Court of the district in which the property is situated.

At least twenty days prior to the sale, the execution creditor prepares the conditions of sale, which must include a condition for payment by the purchaser of any interest due to a preferent creditor from the sale of the property to the date of transfer. The execution creditor will then deliver two copies of the conditions of sale to the sheriff, and one copy to each person entitled to notice of the sale. Any interested party may then apply for a modification of such conditions of sale.

After the sale, the sheriff prepares a plan of distribution of the proceeds of the sale. After the property is transferred, and the plan of distribution of the proceeds has lain open for inspection, the necessary pay-outs are made to the creditors in accordance with the plan of distribution.

An attachment in respect of immovables is valid for one year from the date of attachment.

===== Interpleader proceedings =====
It may happen that a third party, other than a judgment debtor, lays claim to property seized by the sheriff. As has already been explained, the sheriff will proceed with the attachment notwithstanding the fact that a third-party claimant alleges ownership of the property. In such an event, an interpleader may be the most appropriate course of action.

In Bernstein v Visser, the court explained that an interpleader is a form of procedure available to a person who is in custody of property to which the custodian lays no claim by right, but to which two or more other persons lay claim.

The custodian may, in terms of an interpleader, oblige any two persons laying claim to the property to fight out their claims among themselves, without putting the custodian to the expense and trouble of an action or actions.

Although not unique to the execution process, the interpleader occurs most frequently in this context because it provides an obvious mechanism by which the sheriff as custodian, who has seized or is about to seize property as part of the execution process, is spared the risk of becoming involved in conflicting claims which may potentially arise in the exercise of his statutory duty.

When considering the relevant rules of the High Court, and the appropriate section and rules of the Magistrate's Court, one should not lose sight of the fact that interpleader proceedings may occur in a context other than execution.

In the High Court, interpleader proceedings are dealt with in terms of HCR 58, and in the Magistrate's Court in terms of section 69 of the Magistrates' Courts Act, read with MCR 39 and 44. Although the form of process is slightly different, the procedure is similar.

===== Magistrates' Courts =====
Where a third-party claimant lays claim to property attached or about to be attached by the sheriff, or to any proceeds of property so attached and sold in execution, the sheriff must give notice of such claim to the execution creditor.

The execution creditor has ten days after the receipt of the notice in which to admit the claim, in which event the execution creditor will not be liable for any costs, fees or expenses afterwards incurred, and the sheriff may withdraw from possession of the property concerned. Where the execution creditor does not admit the claim, the sheriff must sue out an interpleader summons in terms of section 69 of the Magistrates' Courts Act, read with MCR 44.

Section 69 of the Magistrates' Courts Act makes provision for interpleader proceedings in two different circumstances. Two different forms for interpleader summons are provided for in Annexure 1 to the rules of the Magistrate's Court, in order to provide for each circumstance:

1. Section 69(1) makes specific provision for interpleader proceedings in the context of property attached or about to be attached in execution under the process of any court. Interpleader summons must be in accordance with Annexure 1, Form 35.
2. Section 69(2) is the general provision which provides for interpleader proceedings in all other cases where two or more persons make adverse claims to any property in the custody or possession of a third party. In such a case the summons must be in accordance with Annexure 1, Form 36.

A similar structure, providing for a specific interpleader process, and for a general interpleader process, emerges from MCR 44. The former, in MCR 44(2), is the most relevant for present purposes.

MCR 44(2) provides that, where the third-party claimant makes a claim in respect of property attached by the sheriff, and the execution creditor has not admitted the claim within the ten-day period referred to above, the sheriff must sue out an interpleader summons in the prescribed form, calling on the third-party claimant and the execution creditor to appear on the date specified in the summons, to have the claim adjudicated upon.

The third-party claimant must, not less than ten days before the date of the hearing specified in the summons, lodge with the sheriff an affidavit in triplicate, setting forth the particulars of the claim and the grounds thereof. The sheriff will then forward a copy of the affidavit to the execution creditor, and another copy to the execution debtor.

On the date of the hearing, the parties must appear in court. The court will adjudicate the dispute between the claimants. It may

- order the third-party claimant to state, orally or in writing, on oath or otherwise (as the court may deem expedient), the nature and particulars of the claim;
- order that the matters in issue be tried on a day to be appointed for that purpose; or
- try the matters in dispute in a summary manner.

Where the matter is tried, the normal rules of a trial action apply. The court may make such order as to any additional expenses of execution occasioned by the claim, and for payment of costs incurred by the application or sheriff, as may be just.

If a third-party claimant fails to appear in court on the stipulated day, or fails to deliver an affidavit in the stipulated time, or within such further period as the court may allow, or appears but fails to comply with any order made by the court after an appearance, the court may make an order barring the third party from making any further claim in respect of the subject matter of the dispute.

From a practical point of view, it is usually advisable to proceed by way of the interpleader. When in doubt, however, it might be best to proceed instead with a section 65 procedure.

=== Debt collection ===
The decision of Coetzee v Government declared the imprisonment provisions in section 65 of the MCA to be unconstitutional, with effect from 22 September 1995.

The Act provides for several means whereby a creditor may exact payment of his debt. The process of execution after gaining a judgment is costly and time-consuming. Because the majority of cases involve the payment of accounts for goods provided, or for services rendered, and for which the defendant has no valid defence, the Act provides in sections 55 to 60 a procedure whereby judgment may be obtained in this kind of instance without first issuing a summons and following the full summons procedure.

The Act also provides in section 65 for a procedure whereby debtors may be summonsed before the court to face an inquiry into their failure to pay the debt. Following such an inquiry, the court may issue various orders:

- an order to pay the debt in whole or in instalments;
- a writ of execution; or
- an emoluments-attachment order.

Prior to the decision in Coetzee, the sanction for non-compliance on the part of the debtor was imprisonment, which was described as "imprisonment for contempt of court". Sachs J, in his judgment in Coetzee, described this as a misnomer. This form of imprisonment, when it related to failure to pay or the inability to pay debts, was nothing more than a disguised extension of civil imprisonment for debt, which had been abolished by the Abolition of Civil Imprisonment Act of 1977. Didcott J commented, obiter, that he could see circumstances in which imprisonment for failure to pay a debt could be defended. The decision explicitly does not impugn other provisions which do allow imprisonment for failure to pay debts of certain categories, such as maintenance orders.

The decision abolished the committal procedure of section 65 as being contrary to the right to freedom of the person. It found particularly that the procedure could not be defended as a justifiable limitation on that right, because the provisions were unreasonable on the grounds of "overbreadth". The court held that the committal procedure was separable from the remainder of the section, and that, therefore, only references to the committal procedure were excised from the section.

The result of Coetzee is that the procedure of section 65 has had its teeth drawn. What remains is the inquiry into the financial status of the debtor and the possibility of orders being made as a result of that inquiry. A creditor will no longer be able to obtain a writ of imprisonment on failure of the debtor to attend such an inquiry. Where a debtor deliberately refuses to co-operate with the courts regarding his refusal to pay a debt, even a proper judgment debt, the creditor who finds that the normal process of execution yields no dividends will have to resort to an administration order in terms of section 74, or to full-scale sequestration.

As noted by Sachs J in Coetzee, the small debtor without means will no longer be faced with imprisonment, from which he can only be rescued by family or friends. Further, creditors will no longer be able to extend credit on the basis that the debt can be exacted through fear of imprisonment. Credit should be extended only to those who are creditworthy, and to those who provide proper security.

==== Recovery of debts in terms of Chapter VIII of the Act ====
Chapter VIII provides a procedure whereby a creditor may obtain judgment without the issue of a summons. If the debtor admits liability, the creditor may proceed to gain an order against the debtor.

If the creditor proceeds by way of summons, and the debtor consents to judgment, certain provisions also provide for obtaining an appropriate judgment.

===== Section 56 =====
Section 56 provides that a registered letter of demand may be sent by the attorney acting for a creditor to a debtor who is liable for the payment of the debt ("any liquidated sum of money due") claimed in the letter.

Section 56 further provides that, should the debtor pay the debt upon receipt of the letter, the creditor shall be entitled to recover the fees and costs prescribed in the rules for a registered letter of demand, provided that the amount of such fees and costs was stated in the letter of demand. No specific format is prescribed for the letter of demand; this is unlike the position in regard to summons.

In terms of section 56, the letter of demand must be sent by registered post by an attorney to the debtor. In terms of rule 4B, the letter must contain particulars of the nature and amount of the claim.

===== Section 57 =====
Section 57 provides

- that the defendant may admit his liability to the plaintiff;
- that he may offer to pay the debt in instalments; and
- that he may agree to allow the plaintiff to apply for judgment against him, and for a court order in accordance with his offer to pay the amount due by him in instalments.

===== Section 58 =====
In contrast, section 58 provides for an unconditional consent to judgment, coupled with a consent to an order of court for the payment of the debt in instalments.

Both

- where a defendant admits liability in terms of section 57 and undertakes to pay the debt, in instalments or otherwise; and
- where a defendant in terms of section 58 consents to judgment, or to judgment and an order for the payment of the judgment debt in instalments,

the defendant may take the steps set out above after he has been summonsed, or after he has received a letter of demand in terms of section 56.

==== Section 65 procedure ====
Where there has been judgment for the payment of a sum of money, and the judgment debtor has made a written offer to pay in instalments, and where such offer is accepted by the judgment creditor or his attorney, the judgment creditor may apply to the clerk of the court for an order that the debtor pay such amount in accordance with the offer. Such an order is deemed to be an order for the purpose of launching the following procedures:

===== Notice to summon debtor to appear before court =====
The debtor may be summoned to appear before the court if the judgment or order has not been complied with for a period of ten days from

- the date on which it was given;
- the date on which an instalment became payable; or
- the expiry of a period of suspension ordered in terms of section 48(e).

The notice calling upon the debtor to appear before the courting chambers must be in a printed form. It must indicate the date of judgment or order, as well as the amount of the judgment and the balance of the capital, interest, costs and collection fees which the defendant has undertaken to pay in terms of section 57(1)(c), and which remains due on the date of issue or reissue of the notice.

This notice is supported by an affidavit (or affirmation) by the judgment creditor or a certificate by his attorney in which the following averments are made:

- the date of the judgment or the date of the expiry of the period of suspension under section 48(e) of the Act, as the case may be;
- that the judgment or order has remained unsatisfied for a period of ten days from the date on which it was given or became payable, or from the expiry of the period of suspension in terms of section 48(e);
- in what respect the judgment debtor has failed to comply with the judgment or order referred to in section 65A(1) of the Act, the amount in arrears and outstanding balance on the date on which the notice is issued;
- that the judgment debtor has been advised by registered letter of the terms of the judgment, or of the expiry of the period of suspension under section 48(e) of the Act, as the case may be, and of the consequences of his failure to satisfy the judgment, and that a period of ten days has elapsed since the date on which the letter was posted; and
- that the court is not barred by the provisions of the National Credit Act from making an order.

When the original judgment or order for payment of the judgment debt, referred to in section 65A(1), has been given in any court other than the court of the district in which the inquiry is held, the clerk of the court may not issue the notice calling on the debtor to appear before the court until a certified copy of the judgment has been lodged with him.

Any alteration in the notice to the debtor must be initialed by the judgment creditor or his attorney, and by the clerk of the court before issue or reissue.

The clerk may not issue the section 65A notice until it is shown, from the minutes of the proceedings, that the debtor was present or represented when judgment was given, or a warrant of execution was served on the debtor personally—unless the judgment creditor or his attorney demonstrates that the debtor has been notified by registered letter of the terms of the judgment or of the expiry of the period of suspension ordered under section 48(e), and a period of ten days has elapsed since the posting of the letter.

A new section 65A(6) provides that, where the court is satisfied that the debtor has knowledge of the notice in section 65A(1), and has failed to appear, or where the debtor fails to appear on a postponement date, or where he has failed to remain in attendance, the court may issue a warrant of arrest to bring the debtor before a competent court to conduct an enquiry in terms of section 65A(1).

Section 65A(8) provides that a person so arrested should, as soon as reasonably possible, be brought before the court within the district which that person was arrested. He may be detained at a police station pending the court appearance.

Instead of arresting the debtor (but only if the creditor consents), the sheriff may hand the debtor a notice calling upon him to attend court.

A willful refusal or failure to appear in terms of a notice in terms of section 65A(1) or (8) constitutes an offence, making the debtor liable to a fine or to imprisonment for a period not exceeding three months. Section65A(10) provides details of the procedure to be followed when the court inquires into the failure of a debtor to attend.

Section 65A makes provision throughout for the summonsing of a juristic person, represented by a director or officer.

===== Procedure when debtor appears before court in camera =====
When the debtor appears before the court in camera on the return day mentioned in the notice, he gives evidence under oath or affirmation as to his financial position.

The court permits examination or cross-examination of the judgment debtor in relation to all matters affecting his financial position and his ability to pay the judgment debt and costs, and also in relation to his failure to do so.

The court hears such further evidence as may be adduced (orally or by affidavit, or in such other manner as the court may deem just), and as is material to the determination of the judgment debtor's financial position, his ability to pay the judgment debt and his failure to do so. Witnesses may be summoned for the purpose of giving such evidence.

The Act prescribes the factors which the court must take into consideration in determining the ability of the debtor to pay the debt due. These factors are

- the nature of his income;
- the amounts needed by him for his necessary expenses and those of the persons dependent upon him; and
- the amount in periodical payments that he is obliged to make in terms of an order of court, agreement or otherwise in respect of his other commitments

The court may, in its discretion, refuse to take account of periodical payments that a judgment debtor has undertaken to make in terms of instalment sale transactions for the purchase of goods not exempted from attachment, or goods which, in the opinion of the court, cannot be regarded as household requirements.

If, at the hearing, the court is satisfied that the judgment debtor has movable or immovable property which may be attached and sold in order to satisfy the judgment debt, or part of it, the court may

- authorise the issuing of a warrant of execution against such movable or immovable property, or such part of it as the court may deem fit; or
- authorise the issuing of such a warrant, together with an order for the payment of the judgment debt, in periodical instalments in terms of section 73.

If it appears to the court that there is a debt due to the judgment debtor which may be attached in terms of section 72, the court may authorise the attachment of that debt in terms of that section.

If it is apparent from the evidence that, after receipt of the notice to appear in court in terms of section 65A(1), the judgment debtor made a written offer to pay the judgment debt in instalments or otherwise, or that the debtor is able to pay the debt in reasonable instalments, the court may order him to pay the judgment debt and costs in specified instalments, and may also authorise the issuing of an emoluments attachment order.

The further hearing of the matter is thereupon postponed. The proceedings may again be placed on the roll by the judgment creditor or his attorney by notice delivered or posted at least ten days before the day appointed in such notice for the hearing.

The court may in any event postpone the proceedings at any time in the presence of the judgment debtor or, in the case of a juristic person, in the presence of the director or officer of the debtor, to such date as the court may determine.

When postponing the proceedings, the court informs the judgment debtor or the director or officer in question of the provisions of section 65E(1)(c), and may order the judgment debtor, etc., to produce such documents as the court may specify at the hearing on the date determined by the court. The court may, in addition, stipulate such conditions as it deems fit.

As far as the costs of the appearance at the hearing in chambers are concerned, the rule applies that the judgment debtor will be ordered to pay the costs unless it appears at the hearing that the debtor has made an offer to settle the judgment debt in instalments that the court considers reasonable, or unless it appears that he has notified the judgment creditor that he was not able to make an offer, and the court finds this to be true. If it emerges that the creditor refused the offer, the court may order the judgment creditor to pay those costs, including the loss of wages suffered by the debtor through having to appear in court in connection with the proceedings.

The court may suspend, amend or rescind its order. If the debtor or his representative was not present in court at the time the order was made, the judgment creditor or his attorney is obliged to advise him forthwith, by registered post, of the terms of the order and of the consequences of his failure to satisfy it.

===== Section 65 and administration orders =====
The court may postpone the hearing in terms of section 65A(1) if the judgment debtor lodges with the court an application for an administration order prior to or at the time of the hearing.

If a debtor has not lodged an application for an administration order with the court before or at the time of the hearing of the section 65 proceedings, and it appears at the hearing that the judgment debtor has other debts also, the court considers whether all of the judgment debtor's debts should be treated collectively. If the court is of the opinion that they should be so treated, it may, with a view to granting the administration order, postpone further hearing of the proceedings to a date determined by the court, and order the judgment debtor

- to submit to the court a full statement of his affairs; and
- to cause a copy of the statement to be delivered to each of his creditors at least three days before the date appointed for the further hearing.

If it appears that the judgment debtor's total debts do not exceed R50,000, the court may grant the administration order in respect of his estate, and stay further proceedings, but may grant the judgment creditor the costs already incurred in connection with such proceedings.

==== Emoluments attachment orders ====
A distinction must be drawn between a garnishee order and an emoluments attachment order:

- A garnishee order is a method used to attach a debt due to the judgment debtor.
- An emoluments attachment order is regarded as part of the procedure for the collection of debt. In this instance, the court orders the judgment debtor's employer to make regular monthly deductions from the debtor's salary, and to pay them to the judgment creditor.

An emoluments-attachment order will only be granted if

- the debtor has consented thereto in writing, or the court has so authorised; or
- the judgment creditor has sent a registered letter to the debtor at his last known address, informing him of the judgment debt and the amount outstanding, and that an emoluments attachment order will be issued ten days from the posting of the letter. The judgment creditor must place an affidavit before the court setting out the outstanding amount of the judgment, and how the specific instalment and cash have accumulated from the date of the judgment, and the balance owing.

When the judgment creditor issues an emoluments attachment order out of any court other than the one in which the judgment was obtained, a certified copy of the judgment against the debtor must accompany the affidavit.

If the court authorises the issuing of an emoluments-attachment order in terms of section 65J(1), the order must be issued in the form prescribed by the rules, and must contain sufficient information, including the identity number, work number or date of birth of the judgment debtor, to enable the garnishee to identify the judgment debtor.

The emoluments-attachment order must be signed by the judgment creditor or his attorney, and by the clerk of the court, and served on the garnishee (the employer) by the sheriff in the manner prescribed.

The order is executed against the garnishee as if it were a court judgment, subject to the right of the garnishee and the debtor, or any other interested party, to dispute the existence or validity of the order or the correctness of the balance claimed.

The deductions are made monthly, commencing at the end of the month following that in which the emoluments attachment order was served upon the garnishee.

The garnishee is entitled to commission of up to five per cent of all amounts paid over by him in terms of the order. This commission is deducted from the amount paid to the creditor.

If it is shown that the debtor, after satisfaction of the order, will not have sufficient means for his own and his dependants' maintenance, the court will rescind the order or amend it in such a way as to affect only the balance of the debtor's emoluments over and above such sufficient means.

The court may in any event, on good cause shown, suspend or amend or rescind the emoluments attachment order on such conditions as it may deem just.

Should the debtor leave the service of the garnishee before the debt has been paid in full, he must forthwith advise the creditor of the name and address of his new employer. The creditor may cause a certified copy of the order to be served on the new employer, together with a certificate specifying the balance outstanding on account of the debt. The new employer is thereupon bound by the order, subject to his right to dispute the existence or validity of the order and the correctness of the balance claimed.

Whenever any debtor to whom an emoluments order relates leaves the service of the garnishee before the debt has been paid in full, and becomes self-employed or is employed by someone else, he is, pending the service of the emoluments order upon his new employer, again obliged to comply with the order made by the court in terms of section 65J(1)(a) or (b), which provides in essence that he must pay the debt and costs in specific instalments as set out in the order.

==== Debt-collecting procedure in regard to certain classes of debtor ====
===== Debtors against whom judgment has been granted in the High Court =====
Section 65M provides that, where judgment for the payment of money has been given by a division of the High Court, the judgment creditor may file with the clerk of the court a certified copy of that judgment and an affidavit specifying the amount still owing and how it has been arrived at.

The judgment then has all the effects of a judgment of that Magistrate's Court, even though the amount of the judgment may exceed the jurisdiction of the court. The procedure generally followed for the collection of debts in the Magistrates' Courts is thereafter followed in collecting that amount.

In terms of section 65M, the debtor is entitled to dispute the correctness of the amount specified in the affidavit.

===== Juristic persons =====
Section 65A(1) provides that, where a judgment debtor is a juristic person, either a director or an officer of the juristic person may be called upon as a representative of the juristic person, in his personal capacity, to appear before the court to show cause why he should not be ordered to pay the judgment debt in instalments.

Wherever the legislation alludes to a "judgment debtor", it refers also to the director or officer of the juristic person. For all practical purposes, the juristic person is placed in the same position with regard to section 65 proceedings as a debtor who is a natural person.

The court may, at the request of the debtor, at any stage of the proceedings, if the director or officer ceases to be a director or officer of the juristic person, or absconds, replace the director or officer with any other person who at the time of the replacement is a director or officer of the juristic person; the proceedings then continue as if there has been no replacement.

==== Administration orders ====
In terms of section 74 of the MCA, an application for an administration order is described as a modified form of insolvency proceedings, and provides for debt relief for debtors whose debts amount to less than R50,000.

In principle the procedure provides for a rescheduling of a debtor's debt without sequestrating the debtor's estate.

In terms of this order, a court will assist the debtor by appointing an administrator to take control of the debtor's financial affairs, and to manage the payment of debts due to creditors.

In terms of the order, the debtor has an obligation to make regular payments to the administrator. After deducting necessary expenses and a specified remuneration determined by tariff, the administrator will in turn make a regular distribution in weekly or monthly instalments, or otherwise out of such received payments to all creditors.

===== Application for administration order =====
In terms of section 74(1)(a), where a debtor possesses a regular income, and where the burden of debt is reasonably manageable, the debtor may obtain an administration order from the court of the district in which he resides, carries on business or is employed, in the following circumstances:

- where he is unable immediately to satisfy a judgment obtained against him in court;
- where no judgment has yet been obtained against the debtor, but he has insufficient cash on hand to meet his financial obligations, and in addition lacks sufficient realisable assets capable of satisfying his debts.

Additionally, in terms of section 65I, an administration order may be granted against a debtor who applied for such an order during a section 65 in camera inquiry into the debtor's financial position. The application for an administration order enjoys preference, so the court will suspend the section 65 in camera hearing until the application for an administration order has been disposed of.

The procedure for applying for an administration order is based on an application, together with a prescribed statement of affairs, in which the debtor affirms on oath that the names of the creditors and the amounts owed to them, and all other statements or declarations made in the statement, are true.

The application is lodged with the clerk and delivered personally, or by registered post, to the creditors at least three calendar days before the hearing.

The true basis for the application is that the debtor is unable to pay his debts as they become due.

The clerk must, in accordance with the Act, assist an illiterate debtor in preparing the application. In practice, it is usual for an attorney to assist the debtor in preparing the application.

===== Hearing of the application =====
The application is heard before a magistrate in a section 65 court, and in the presence of the debtor or an appointed legal representative, as well as the creditors and their respective legal representatives.

All the debts listed in the statement of affairs are deemed to be proved, subject to any amendments the court may make, except where a creditor objects to a listed debt, or the court rejects or requires the debt to be substantiated by evidence.

Similarly, when the debtor objects to a creditor's claim, the court will require the creditor to prove the claim. The court, or any creditor or legal representative, may question the debtor with regard to

- assets and liabilities;
- present and future income, including the income of a spouse;
- standard of living and the possibility of economising; and
- any other relevant matter.

===== Contents of administration order =====
The content of an administration order takes a prescribed form. It must set out

- that the debtor's estate has been placed under administration;
- that an administrator has been appointed; and
- the amount the debtor is obliged to pay.

The order must specifically state a weekly or monthly amount to be paid over to the administrator by the debtor. This amount is calculated in terms of section 74C(2) by taking into account the difference between the future income of the debtor and certain prescribed "necessary expenses".

Unless the court or the Act provides otherwise, the cost of the application in terms of section 74(1) becomes a first claim against the moneys controlled by the administrator.

In futuro debts—that is to say, debts which become due and payable in the future, including mortgage bonds and assets subject to credit agreements—are excluded from the administration order. This means that the court will exclude a certain amount of money from the weekly or monthly payments made to the administrator for the purpose of allowing the debtor to make periodical payments in terms of a credit instalment sale agreement or existing maintenance or mortgage-bond obligations.

Where the administration order provides for the payment of instalments out of future income, the court shall authorise the issue of an emoluments or garnishee attachment order to facilitate payments by the debtor.

=== Costs ===
The term "legal costs" refers to the costs that are payable in respect of the fees of any legal practitioner who has acted on behalf of a party, and any expenses incurred in respect of such items as telephone calls, faxes, photocopies or payments to the sheriff of the court for service of a document.

These costs are payable by a client to his attorney

- in terms of an account rendered by the attorney to the client; or
- in terms of an agreement between the two.

Each party is responsible to its own attorney for payment of the attorney's fees, and for payment of monies disbursed by the attorney on behalf of the client, including the fees of any advocate who may have been briefed in the matter—irrespective of whether the client won or lost the case.

In civil matters, each party usually claims an order for recovery from the other party of the costs paid to his own attorney. Therefore, in almost every civil matter, the court is required, when granting judgment, to consider

- whether an order in respect of costs should be made; and,
- if so, what the order should be.

As a result of the Contingency Fees Act, it is now possible for attorneys to charge on a contingency basis. The attorney and client may agree that the attorney will charge the client only if he succeeds in the case. If the client loses, he is not charged for fees by his own attorney. Owing to the risk involved, the Act allows the attorney to charge a larger amount than he would be entitled to charge if the matter were conducted on a normal basis.

In terms of section 83(6) and (7) of the Attorney's Act, a practising attorney may not share his professional fees with anyone other than another practising attorney. The allowance to the other attorney may not, directly or indirectly, exceed a third of the fees charged. An unqualified person may not receive remuneration from a practitioner for work done where he is not permitted by law to carry out such work.

==== General principles ====
The court which hears a matter has a wide discretion as to costs, but it is expected that the court will exercise this discretion in accordance with well-established principles.

The most important of these principles is that, where a party has been substantially successful in bringing or defending a claim, that party is generally entitled to have a costs order made in his favour against the party who was unsuccessful. This principle is often expressed by the saying that "the costs follow the outcome of the case". The result of such an order is that the losing party will have to pay a substantial portion of the costs incurred by the winning party, along with his or her own costs.

Other principles which the civil courts frequently apply, in conjunction with this main principle, are

- that a successful party may be deprived of costs if there is good reason for this;
- that matters which are separate and distinct usually carry their own costs;
- that judgment on the merits is usually a prerequisite for a costs order, but that orders made in respect of interlocutory procedures may include an appropriate costs order;
- that small or partial successes may carry an appropriate or commensurate award of costs;
- that a successful application for the granting of an indulgence does not carry a costs order;
- that a party who unnecessarily causes costs must bear those costs; and
- that, in exceptional circumstances, a party may be ordered to pay costs on a more punitive scale than would normally have applied (an attorney-and-client scale, for example, instead of party-and-party scale).

A party may, in exceptional circumstances, be ordered to pay his counterparty's cost. Such circumstances include fraud, dishonesty, reckless, malicious or frivolous motives and grave misconduct.

It is clear from the principles above that equity is an important consideration.

In recent years, the Constitutional Court, the Land Claims Court and the Labour Courts have adopted a new principle: that persons should not be deterred from enforcing their rights because they fear that they will have to pay their opponent's costs, on top of their own, if they do not succeed.

In Hlatshwayo v Hein, the Land Claims Court held that it does not see itself as being bound to follow the usual approach of the superior courts in awarding costs. It will give due weight to the constitutional obligation to promote the fundamental right of access to the courts in such a way that legitimate litigants will not be deterred, for fear of an adverse costs order, from approaching the court to have disputes settled.

In the High Courts and the Magistrates' Courts, the principle that the loser pays the winner's costs is still applied in almost all cases.

In the Constitutional Court, the Land Claims Court and the Labour Courts, judgments are often given with no order as to costs, or with an order that each party should pay its own costs.

Rule 41(1) of the Divorce Courts provides that parties to divorce proceedings in these courts should pay their own costs, unless there is good reason for the court to order otherwise.

Another well-established principle is that, because the making of an order of costs involves the exercise of a judicial discretion, a court of appeal will not readily interfere with an order of costs made by the court of first instance.

In Attorney-General, Eastern Cape v Blom, it was held that the power of interference on appeal is limited to cases

- of vitiation by misdirection or irregularity; or
- marked by the absence of grounds on which a court, acting reasonably, could have made the order in question.

A court may also reconsider an award of costs if the question of costs, or of the particular award, was not argued before it, without the need for the principles of rescission to be applied.

==== Terminology ====
===== Party-and-party costs =====
Party-and-party costs are those which are necessarily incurred for the purposes of litigation (charged according to the tariff set out in the Rules of Court). This does not include all costs; only those which were necessary and properly incurred in order to obtain justice and to protect the client's rights. Where a court simply makes an order of costs against one party in favour of another, this is deemed to be a party-and-party order of costs.

For example, Cameron institutes a claim against Rodney. The court eventually decides in Cameron's favour. This means that Rodney will have to pay the account of Cameron's attorney in respect of all costs that were necessary in order to obtain justice and to protect Cameron's rights. If Cameron telephoned his attorney to inquire about the progress of the case more often than was reasonably necessary, he will not be able to recover the costs of those telephone calls from Rodney.

===== Attorney-and-client costs =====
An attorney-and-client order of costs entitles the party in whose favour it is made to recover more from the opposing party than he would be able to recover on a party-and-party order of costs.

In a broad sense, attorney-and-client costs include all costs that the attorney is entitled to recover from the client.

In a narrow sense, they include those costs and charges and expenses, between attorney and client, which ordinarily the client cannot recover from the other party.

If, for example, a court granted judgment in favour of Armand against Corbin, with costs on the attorney-and-client scale, Armand would be entitled to recover from Corbin all the costs that Armand's attorney would justifiably have been able to recover from Armand.

Attorney-and-client orders are often made because the losing party agreed to pay such costs in an agreement prior to litigation. A court may also make an attorney-and-client order to penalise a party which the court believes has acted improperly.

===== Attorney-and-own-client costs =====
Attorney-and-own-client costs are the remuneration to which an attorney is entitled, in terms of an agreement or mandate with the client which stipulates that the attorney is to be remunerated according to a predetermined rate (hourly, for example).

This order of costs therefore entitles the party in whose favour it is made to recover even more than could be recovered in terms of an attorney-and-client costs award.

Magistrates' Courts are not entitled to grant attorney-and-own-client costs.

If a court granted judgment in Debbie's favour, against Margo, with costs on the attorney-and-own-client scale, and Debbie and her attorney agreed that the attorney could charge, for example, an hourly fee for consultations, which is twice as high as that prescribed by the tariff, Margo will have to pay that agreed fee.

===== Costs de bonis propriis =====
This is an order that the costs be paid by the attorney, instead of by the client. A court will make this kind of order where it believes that it was the attorney's fault that certain legal costs were incurred.

A court may also order costs de bonis propiis against a person who acts in a representative capacity, such as an executor of a deceased estate, or a trustee of an insolvent estate. Such costs are usually granted if there is a substantial deviation from the responsibilities of the person's office—where, for example, the person has acted mala fide, negligently or unreasonably.

===== Wasted costs =====
Costs are "wasted" when the services for which those costs are charged are of no use to the parties to the action.

Where, for example, a party sets a matter down for trial, and then postpones the matter, the relevant notice of set-down is a useless procedure, and the costs related to it are wasted costs.

===== Costs reserved =====
A costs-reserved order entails that the issue of which of the parties is to pay the costs of a particular procedure will be decided at a later stage, usually at the end of the matter, when the court can adjudicate the issue in the light of everything that has occurred in course of the proceedings.

The court usually reserves cost for argument and determination by a trial court when the liability for costs of an interim application would be more effectively determined by the trial court.

===== Costs in the cause =====
This means that the costs of preliminary or interlocutory proceedings are included in the total costs of the court case.

The party who must pay the costs in respect of the main case then also carries the costs of the preliminary or interlocutory procedure in respect of which costs were made costs in the cause.

===== Costs of the day =====
This refers to costs occasioned to a party in respect of proceedings that occurred on a specific day, usually wasted costs occasioned by a postponement.

===== All costs =====
Such an order refers to party-and-party costs, unless the court indicates otherwise.

===== No costs order =====
Where a court expressly indicates "no order as to costs", each party is liable for its own costs.

Where the High Court fails to deal with costs at all, it is not finalised. Any one of the parties may then approach the court for a costs order.

Where no order is made as to costs in the Magistrates' Courts, such costs will be costs in the action.

==== Taxation of bills of cost ====
A bill of costs is an itemised account reflecting all the charges, including fees and disbursements, made by an attorney. The fees charged in a party-and-party bill of costs must be in accordance with the tariff of fees and charges set out in the schedule to the Rules of Court. Briefly, a bill of costs should indicate

- the date on which the work was done;
- the item in respect of which costs are charged (which items must be listed in chronological order, and should be numbered);
- the number of folios or pages involved, and the period of time spent in relation to each item;
- a precise description of each item; and
- fees for each item, charged in accordance with the applicable tariff.

The party who has been ordered to pay costs requires the party who is claiming the costs to have the bill taxed by the taxing master of the court.

Before a bill of costs may be taxed, the party who has drafted the bill must request a date for taxation from the taxing master.

After such a date has been allocated, the party who drafted the bill must send a notice of taxation to the other party, to inform him where and when the taxation will occur.

Both parties are entitled to be present at the taxation, and to put argument to the taxing master in favour of or against the charges being taxed.

HCR 70(4) provides that the taxing master shall not proceed to the taxation of any bill of costs unless he is satisfied that the party liable to pay has received due notice as to the time and place of such taxation, together with notice that he is entitled to be present. Such notice is not necessary, however,

- when the party against whom costs have been awarded has not appeared at the hearing, either in person or through his legal representation;
- if the person liable to pay costs has consented in writing to taxation in his absence; or
- for the taxation of writ and post-writ bills.

In this regard, MCR 33(16) provides that, where costs or expenses are awarded to any party by the court (otherwise than by a judgment in default of the defendant's entry of appearance to defend, or on the defendant's consent to judgment before the time for such appearance has expired), the party to whom such costs or expenses have been awarded must deliver a bill of such costs or expenses. Such party must give at least five days' notice of taxation for an hour to be fixed, generally or specially, by the clerk of the court, and may include in such bill all payments that have necessarily and properly been made by him.

During the taxation, the attorney of the party against whom the costs order was granted, and who is thus liable to pay the account, will bring to the attention of the taxing officer all items that in his opinion should not appear on such account.

For example, it may be argued that unnecessary telephone calls were made. The attorney who submitted the bill will then have to furnish reasons to the taxing master why those telephone calls were made, and furnish proof thereof by notes of telephone conversations on file.

When the taxation of the bill is finalised, the taxing master allocates the amount that is payable in terms of the taxed bill of costs, puts his stamp on it, and signs it. This "endorsement" is known as the taxing master's allocatur. The taxed bill then has the effect of a court order; if the party who is liable for payment of same fails to pay the bill of costs, payment may be enforced by means of a warrant of execution.

Review of taxation is provided for by HCR 48 and MCR 35.

==== Costs and tariffs ====
===== High Court =====
HCR 67 indicates which fees are payable to the court, while HCR 68 indicates which tariffs are applicable to the sheriff. HCR 69 sets out the maximum fees for advocates on the party-and-party scale in certain matters.

HCR 70 provides for taxation, and provides the tariff for fees that may be charged by attorneys. The latter tariff is divided into the following parts:

- Part A: consultations, appearances, conferences and inspections
- Part B: drafting and drawing
- Part C: attendance and perusal
- Part D: miscellaneous (including the making of copies, telephone calls and faxes)
- Part E: charges in connection with the bill of costs
- Part F: execution

===== Magistrate's Court =====
In the Magistrate's Court, costs and fees are provided for by sections 80 and 81 of the Magistrates' Courts Act, MCR 33, 34 and 35, as well as the scale of costs and fees contained in Tables A and B of Annexure 2 of the MCRs.

== Action versus application proceedings ==
There are two different forms which proceedings may take: action or trial proceedings and application or motion proceedings. The key difference is that application proceedings are used only where there is no material dispute as to the facts.

=== Application proceedings ===
Since there is no material dispute of fact, in application proceedings the case proceeds largely on a dispute of law; witnesses are normally not called. Evidence is presented on paper and not viva voce. The case usually involves two legal representatives, who appear before a presiding officer and present their respective arguments based on facts which have already been recorded by either party in an affidavit. Having thus put his version of events on paper, the client need not appear in person.

Application proceedings commence with a notice of motion, together with a founding affidavit. Parties to these proceedings are called the applicant and the respondent.

=== Action proceedings ===
Action proceedings are trials as we know them. They involve the calling of witnesses, who give their evidence orally before the court. At the end of the case, the legal representatives will sum up the evidence and argue which way the court should decide. There are usually multiple disputes of fact; as such, the court is required to weigh up the evidence and rule as to which version is the more probable.

Action proceedings commence with a summons followed by an exchange of pleadings based on the facts. The parties are referred to as the plaintiff and the defendant.

== Appeals and reviews ==
Appeals are based on the grounds that the decision by the trial court was wrong in fact or law. An appeal relates to the substantive correctness of a decision: that is, to findings of fact and law. A review relates to procedural fairness.

== Additional procedures ==
=== Settlement ===
==== Offers or tenders to settle during litigation ====
===== High Court =====
Offers of settlement in the High Courts are covered by rule 34, which distinguishes between two types of claim:

- money claims, in which there is an offer, unconditional or without prejudice, of payment of money by the defendant (34(1)); and
- performance claims, in which there is a tender, unconditional or without prejudice, of specific performance by the defendant (34(2)).

If it made as an "offer of compromise" without prejudice, and the plaintiff accepts, the whole claim is extinguished.

The difference between an "unconditional" offer or tender, on the one hand, and an offer or tender "without prejudice," on the other, may be illustrated as follows:

- Unconditional: "I admit that I owe you that particular part of your claim and I am prepared to pay it. I deny that I owe you the rest of your claim, and you're welcome to take the risk of suing me for it if you want to."
- Without prejudice: "I don't think your claim is valid, but I don't want to be tied up in litigation over it. Why not accept partial payment in full and final settlement of your claim, and call it quits?"

An offer or tender without prejudice may only be brought to the court's attention after judgment if it is relevant to costs. If done earlier, it may result in an adverse costs order against party doing so, even if that party is successful.

There is no such prohibition in respect of unconditional offers or tenders.

Whether an offer is unconditional or without prejudice can affect the costs award if the court grants judgment in favour of plaintiff for less than the amount of the offer.

===== Magistrate's Court =====
Rule 18 of the new Magistrates' Courts Rules has essentially replicated rule 34 of the High Courts Rules.

The defendant may make an unconditional payment into the court with an admission of liability, in which case the matter then terminates. The plaintiff is only entitled to costs up to that point. The defendant is not a judgment debtor.

Alternatively, the defendant may make a compromise offer of settlement without admission of liability or without prejudice. If the plaintiff rejects this, the defendant can pay amount into the court in "final settlement." If the plaintiff does not accept payment, this cannot be disclosed to the court until the end of the trial. If judgment is for less than the amount paid in, the court will order payment to the plaintiff in terms of the award. If judgment is for the defendant, not the plaintiff, the plaintiff must make payment into the court of the defendant's costs since payment.

===== Tactical considerations =====
A compromise offer of settlement is a valuable tactical weapon to achieve settlement of the matter. If the plaintiff rejects it, he must be sure that the court will grant judgment for more than the offer, or risk an adverse costs order.

=== Provisional sentence ===
This is an extraordinary, hybrid and speedy procedure, whereby a plaintiff in possession of a liquid document may obtain quick judgment against a defendant for the amount payable on the face of a liquid document.

The procedure is initiated by means of a summons (as in an action procedure). At the preliminary stage, however, it proceeds by way of affidavits (as in an application procedure), and is converted back into an action procedure only once the defendant enters into the principal case.

It is speedy because it allows the plaintiff's claim to be adjudicated upon before trial, and because it accelerates the process of granting judgment (although the judgment at this early stage is merely provisional).

The procedure has two advantages for the plaintiff:

1. As a speedy process, it allows for the prompt recovery of a monetary debt from the defendant.
2. It places an onus on the defendant at the preliminary sage to establish a defence by satisfying the court, on a balance of probabilities, that the defendant should not be made to pay the amount claimed by the plaintiff, and that the probability of success in the principal case does not favour the plaintiff.

The defendant must raise his defence by way of an affidavit, to which the plaintiff may respond with a replying affidavit.

A provisional sentence simply entails that the judgment obtained by the plaintiff at this early stage is provisional and cannot prevent the defendant from proceeding to the principal case. The defendant may choose to satisfy the provisional judgment and subsequently, within two months, and by notification to the plaintiff, enter into the principal case.

The primary principle behind the provisional-sentence procedure is that the court will grant judgment to the plaintiff on the basis of a presumption of indebtedness, founded on the legal validity of the liquid document before the court. The court is thus provisionally satisfied that the plaintiff will succeed in the principal case. The purpose of a provisional sentence is therefore to bring the proceedings to a speedy end, especially when the defendant does not have a defence to the plaintiff's liquid claim.

A provisional sentence must not be confused with a summary judgment. Both are sui generis remedies. Each has its own limited scope of application and specific rules of procedure. Summary judgment may be granted in four situations:

1. where there is a liquid document;
2. in claims for ejectment;
3. in claims for the delivery of specified movable property; and
4. for liquid amounts of money.

==== Liquid document ====
The plaintiff's ability to make use of the provisional-sentence procedure rests on the evidentiary value of the liquid document. On its face, this document must raise a presumption of indebtedness against the defendant.

A liquid document has been defined as a written instrument in which the debtor or an authorised agent, by means of a signature appearing on the face of the document, acknowledges an unconditional liability for the payment of a fixed and certain amount of money.

The document must speak for itself; the acknowledgement of indebtedness must be so clear and certain on the face (ex facie) of the document that no extrinsic evidence (evidence aliunde) is required to prove the amount.

==== Procedure ====
===== Commencement =====
The plaintiff must issue a summons in accordance with Form 3 of the First Schedule to the High Court Rules. The summons must comply with the usual requirements for a summons, in respect of the plaintiff's and the defendant's personal details, and must provide an address for service within eight kilometres of the court.

If the plaintiff is legally represented, the summons must be signed by an attorney. Only copies that are true in all material respects are to be attached to the summons; one need not attach the original of the liquid document on which the claim is founded. Provisional sentence may be refused, or the proceedings postponed, if an improper copy is annexed to the summons. The originals are handed to the court at the application hearing.

The summons must appoint a day, not less than ten days after the service of the summons, on which the defendant is required to appear in court. When the matter is opposed, it must be set down for a High-Court hearing by the plaintiff before noon on the court day but one preceding the day on which it is to be heard. In the Magistrate's Court, the matter must be set down no later than three days before the day on which it will be heard.

The plaintiff may amend a provisional summons in the same way and in terms of the same criteria as any other summons.

A provisional-sentence summons contains the following particulars:

- an averment calling on the defendant to pay the amount or to appear, personally or with representation, before the court to admit or deny liability;
- allowance for the defendant to file an affidavit setting out a defence;
- set-down of a day for the defendant's appearance in court;
- a clear and sufficient averment setting out the cause of action;
- an averment calling on the defendant to admit or deny his or the agent's signature; and
- information as to the consequences of a failure to pay the amount claimed, and as to the right to demand security from the plaintiff if the defendant does not pay the claimed amount.

===== Defendant =====
The defendant may admit liability for the amount claimed, in which case the court may grant final judgment in favour of the plaintiff. There are two alternative choices available to the defendant should he decide to oppose the matter and deny liability:

1. The defendant may deliver an opposing affidavit. In the High Court, the affidavit must be delivered not later than noon on the day but one preceding the court day on which the application will be heard; in the Magistrate's Court, not later than three days before the day upon on it will be heard. The affidavit must set out the grounds on which liability is disputed or contain an admission or denial with respect to the personal signature or the authority or signature of the agent on the face of the liquid document.
2. The defendant may appear in court on the day named in the summons, personally or through a legal representative, and deny liability.

===== Plaintiff =====
Should the defendant choose to defend the matter by filing an opposing affidavit, the plaintiff must be afforded a reasonable opportunity of replying thereto. The application for judgment will be postponed, and the plaintiff will be entitled to file a replying affidavit which canvasses all the points raised in the defendant's opposing affidavit.

The court may at its discretion, but in exceptional circumstances only, allow for a third set of affidavits.

===== Onus of proof =====
The plaintiff and the defendant bear distinct and separate onuses of proof in respect of different issues at the provisional-sentence stage.

Initially, the plaintiff need not prove anything; he may prima facie discharge the primary onus by the mere averment in the summons that the plaintiff is the holder of a liquid document bearing the defendant's signature or that of an authorised agent of the defendant.

If the defendant disputes the validity of the liquid document, by denying the authenticity of the signature or the agent's signature or authority, or by averring that a simple condition must be fulfilled before payment can take place, the onus lies with the plaintiff to prove, on a balance of probabilities, the validity of the document or the fulfilment of the simple condition. The reason why the onus lies with the plaintiff here is that the plaintiff's right to have provisional sentence granted is founded entirely on the presumption of the authenticity and legal validity of the liquid document.

The defendant bears the onus of showing that the probabilities of success in the principal case lie in his or her favour, and that the probability of success in the principal case is against the plaintiff. Even when the defendant raises a defence which is unconnected with the liquid document, the onus remains the same. The defendant's onus must be discharged on the facts set out in his or her affidavit. Unless exceptional circumstances exist, the court will grant provisional sentence.

===== Hearing =====
At the hearing, the plaintiff and the defendant, or their legal representatives, adduce arguments before a motion court. These arguments are based on the allegations and averments raised in the summons, the defendant's opposing affidavit and the plaintiff's replying affidavit.

The plaintiff delivers to the court the original liquid document on which the action is based and moves for judgment on it. The plaintiff's onus of proving the authenticity of the defendant's signature may be decided on the papers alone, or the court may allow the plaintiff to discharge the onus by calling for oral evidence. The court has the authority to hear oral evidence in respect of the authenticity of the defendant's signature or the agent's signature or authority.

The court's authority is limited to these specific instances; it may not call for viva voce evidence of other issues. The court may exercise the power to call for oral evidence only in exceptional circumstances, having regard to the nature and purpose of the provisional-sentence proceeding.

==== Further procedure when provisional sentence is refused ====
Provisional sentence will be refused when the plaintiff fails to discharge his onus of proof on a balance of probabilities, or when the defendant succeeds in discharging his onus of convincing the court that the probabilities of success in the principal case are against the plaintiff.

The matter is then converted into a trial action, in which the rules of pleading and conduct of a trial will apply. The matter proceeds to trial in the usual way, with the court ordering the provisional summons to stand as a normal summons and the defendant to file a plea within a stated time.

It is preferable for the court to order the delivery of a plea by the defendant; otherwise the proceeding may come to an end. During this conversion process, the court has discretion to award such an order as to costs as it may deem just.

==== Further procedure when provisional sentence is granted ====
Provisional sentence will be granted when the plaintiff succeeds in discharging his onus of proof on a balance of probabilities, or when the defendant fails to establish a defence on a balance of probabilities.

The plaintiff is entitled to immediate payment of the judgment amount and taxed costs. If the defendant does not pay the capital amount, the plaintiff may issue a warrant of execution against the defendant's property.

The judgment is only provisional; it does not prevent the defendant from electing to enter into the principal case and obtaining a reversal of the provisional-sentence judgment.

A defendant who chooses to proceed to trial may call upon the plaintiff, once the judgment amount has been paid, to furnish security to the satisfaction of the registrar or the clerk. In practice, the parties usually agree that the capital amount due in terms of the judgment will be paid directly to the registrar or clerk by the defendant, to be held as security.

The object of the security is to ensure that, should the defendant succeed in the principal case, the defendant will receive repayment of the amount which was paid out in terms of the provisional judgment. A plaintiff who fails to provide security is not entitled to provisional relief; he must proceed to the principal case and request a grant of final judgment.

The defendant is not entitled to take any further procedural steps until he has satisfied the provisional judgment or the plaintiff has failed to furnish security when called upon to do so.

Any step taken in breach of these rules will be irregular and liable to be set aside. The defendant may select either of the following two procedural options:

1. The defendant who intends to proceed to trial and enter the principal case must give notice to the plaintiff within two months from the date of the provisional judgment. He must file a plea within ten days of such notice. The provisional summons is subsequently converted into a High-Court combined summons or a Magistrate's-Court ordinary summons, as the case may be.
2. Alternatively, the defendant may choose not to proceed to trial, either by failing to deliver a notice of intention to enter the principal case, or by failing to file a plea within the required time periods. If the defendant does not request condonation for such a failure, or if the court refuses such condonation, the provisional sentence becomes the final judgment. Security lapses when a provisional judgment becomes final. The court is empowered to extend these time periods despite the fact that the judgment has become final. A stay of execution may be granted in exceptional circumstances; a final judgment may even occasionally be rescinded.

==== Principal case ====
The onus of proof is an important principle. It largely determines whether or not the matter will proceed to the principal case. If the court is of the opinion that the probabilities of success are not in favour of either party, or are only in favour of the plaintiff, it is established practice to grant provisional sentence.

The reason why a defendant enters into the principal case is normally that the defendant will enjoy the benefit of being able to lead oral evidence without the limitations imposed by a provisional-sentence proceeding, as well as the benefit of cross-examining the plaintiff's witnesses, which benefit is not available in a provisional-sentence proceeding.

In addition, the onus of proof at the trial is usually borne by the plaintiff, in terms of the rule that "he who makes the averment or asserts the claim must prove it," whereas during the provisional-sentence procedure the onus is on the defendant to satisfy the court that he will succeed in the principal case.

The defendant may therefore find that a trial gives him an advantage over the plaintiff. Nevertheless, in practice, few defendants continue to the principal case. The vast majority of provisional-sentence orders therefore become final judgments.

==== Fairness ====
See Western Bank v Pretorius and Barclays Western Bank v Pretorius.
