= Jaftha v Schoeman =

South African legal case

- Court: Constitutional Court of South Africa
- Full case name: Jaftha v Schoeman and Others; Van Rooyen v Stoltz and Others
- Decided: 8 October 2004
- Docket nos.: CCT 74/03
- Citations: [2004] ZACC 25; 2005 (2) SA 140 (CC); 2005 (1) BCLR 78 (CC)

Case history
- Appealed from: Jaftha v Schoeman and Others [2003] ZAWCHC 26 in the High Court of South Africa, Cape of Good Hope Provincial Division

Court membership
- Judges sitting: Chaskalson CJ, Langa DCJ, Moseneke J, Mokgoro J, Ngcobo J, O’Regan J, Sachs J, Skweyiya J, van der Westhuizen J and Yacoob J

Case opinions
- Decision by: Mokgoro J (unanimous)

Jaftha v Schoeman and Others, Van Rooyen v Stoltz and Others is an important case in South African civil procedure and property law, decided in the Constitutional Court of South Africa on 8 October 2004. The court held unanimously that the Magistrates' Courts Act, 1944 was unconstitutional insofar as it did not provide for judicial oversight over sales in execution against the immovable property of judgment debtors. In a judgment written by Justice Yvonne Mokgoro, the court found that sales in execution limited the debtor's constitutional right to housing and that the prevailing execution scheme was overbroad because it permitted such sales to proceed even in circumstances where they limited that right unjustifiably.

== Background ==
The applicants, Maggie Jaftha and Christina van Rooyen, were unemployed residents of Prince Albert, a small town in the Little Karoo. Each had defaulted on a debt – Jaftha on a loan of R250 taken out in 1998, and Schoeman on a loan of approximately R190 taken out in 1995 – and had lost their homes on 17 August 2001, when each property was separately sold in execution for amounts of R5,000 and R1,000 respectively pursuant to proceedings by their creditors in the Prince Albert Magistrate's Court.

Jaftha and van Rooyen applied to the High Court of South Africa for orders setting aside the sales and executions, and interdicting certain of the respondents from taking transfer of their homes. The basis of the applications was the asserted unconstitutionality of section 66(1) of the Magistrates' Courts Act, 1944, which governed the sale in execution of property for the satisfaction of debts. Their applications were conjoined, because of their similarities, and were opposed by the Minister of Justice and Constitutional Development. In June 2003, the High Court's Cape of Good Hope Provincial Division dismissed their argument, finding that the applicants could either vacate the premises or remain in occupation. If they chose to stay, the new owners would have to evict them according to in terms of the Prevention of Illegal Eviction from and Unlawful Occupation of Land Act, 1998. Jaftha and van Rooyen appealed to the Constitutional Court of South Africa, which heard the matter on 11 May 2004.

== Judgment ==
In a unanimous judgment delivered on 8 October 2004, Justice Yvonne Mokgoro upheld the appeal. The court held that section 66(1)(a) of the Magistrates' Courts Act was unconstitutional and invalid insofar as it failed "to provide judicial oversight over sales in execution against immovable property of judgment debtors". The finding of unconstitutionality rested on the debtors' right to housing as enshrined in section 26 of the Constitution. In interpreting the right to housing, Mokgoro drew on international law, specifically considering Article 11(1) of the International Covenant on Economic, Social and Cultural Rights, 1966, and, in particular, the Committee on Economic, Social and Cultural Rights's General Comment 4 on the interpretation of Article 11(1). While the text of Article 11(1) led Mokgoro to emphasise the requirement of adequate housing, General Comment 4 inspired her emphasis on security of tenure and legal protections for the same. Moreover, security of tenure was doubly important in South Africa because of the country's apartheid history of forced removals.

Mokgoro concluded that the section 26 right to housing is limited by any measure which permits a person to be deprived of existing access to adequate housing. In terms of section 36 of the Constitution, however, some such limitations may be justifiable; indeed, the interests of the creditor should be considered and balanced alongside the debtor's right to housing. In the present case, the balancing exercise tilted in favour of the applicants, in part because their debts were trifling. More generally, and more importantly, section 66(1)(a) did not provide for any balancing exercise to be conducted: it was sufficiently broad to allow sales in execution to proceed in circumstances where they would impose unjustifiable limitations on the debtors' right to housing. Judicial oversight was required to ensure that such sales did not proceed. Thus, in its current form, the provision was overbroad and unconstitutional.

== Significance ==
Jaftha was a landmark case on the rights of delinquent debtors in South African civil procedure. It was applied in Menqa v Markom, Standard Bank v Saunderson, and Gundwana v Steko Development, among others.
