= Menqa v Markom =

South African legal case

Menqa and Another v Markom and Others is an important case in South African property law, heard in the Supreme Court of Appeal (SCA) on 5 November 2007, with judgment handed down on 30 November.

== Facts ==
Pursuant to a default judgment against Markom, the first respondent, his residential property was sold in execution to Menqa, the first appellant (who subsequently sold it to the second appellant). The warrant of execution had been issued by the clerk of the magistrates' court without judicial supervision, but prior to the ruling in Jaftha v Schoeman; Van Rooyen v Stoltz, wherein the Constitutional Court declared unconstitutional the relevant provision in the Magistrates' Courts Act and ordered its amendment.

Menqa, therefore, had acted in good faith, having not knowledge at the time of the defect in the warrant. In the Cape Provincial Division, however, Zondi AJ held that the sale in execution, along with all subsequent sales, was nonetheless null and void, since it might compromise Markom's right in the Constitution of access to adequate housing. Jaftha was therefore applied retrospectively, and the court a quo directed the Registrar of Deeds to reregister Markom as owner of the property.

== Judgment ==
On appeal, the SCA agreed that sales in execution of immovable property, as well as all subsequent sales, were invalid if the warrant of execution had been issued by the magistrates' clerk without judicial supervision. The absence of this procedural safeguard would imperil a party's constitutional rights, even if the warrant was issued before Jaftha, and could not be saved by an application of the Magistrates' Courts Act.

The court also held that, if a sale in execution was null and void because it violated the principle of legality, the sheriff had no authority to transfer ownership to the purchaser, who would therefore not acquire ownership, despite registration of the property in his or her name. On the facts, Markom was theoretically entitled to recover the property in vindicatory proceedings.

The court held further, on the facts, that directing the Registrar of Deeds to reregister the property in Markom's name would not take into account

- what Menqa had paid for the property; and
- Markom's possible unjustified enrichment.

The decision of the court a quo was thus confirmed in part and reversed in part.

In a concurring judgment, Cloete JA found that, at common law, a sale in execution was void for want of compliance with an essential formality, but that non-compliance with non-essential formalities did not have this result. His view was that section 70 of the Magistrates' Courts Act should be interpreted as being to the same effect as the common law, except that a sale in execution in a magistrates' court could be impugned even for want of non-essential formalities where the purchaser did not act in good faith or had notice of the non-compliance. Furthermore, section 70 should not be interpreted as protecting a sale which is void, as this conflicts with the basic principle of legality, as well as the Constitution.
