= S v Motau =

South African legal case

S v Motau and Another is an important case in South African law. It was heard in the Transvaal Provincial Division on March 11, 1963, with judgment handed down on March 25. The judges were Ludorf J en Trollip J.

== Judgment ==
The case was an appeal from a conviction on a charge of arson, which requires by definition that the affected property be immovable. As it appeared that the state had failed to prove sufficiently that the complainant's "house" was immovable, the court substituted a conviction of malicious injury to property, although the appellants had been acquitted on such a charge.

== See also ==
- Arson
- Crime in South Africa
- Law of South Africa
- South African criminal law
- South African property law
