= Standard Bank v Saunderson =

South African legal case

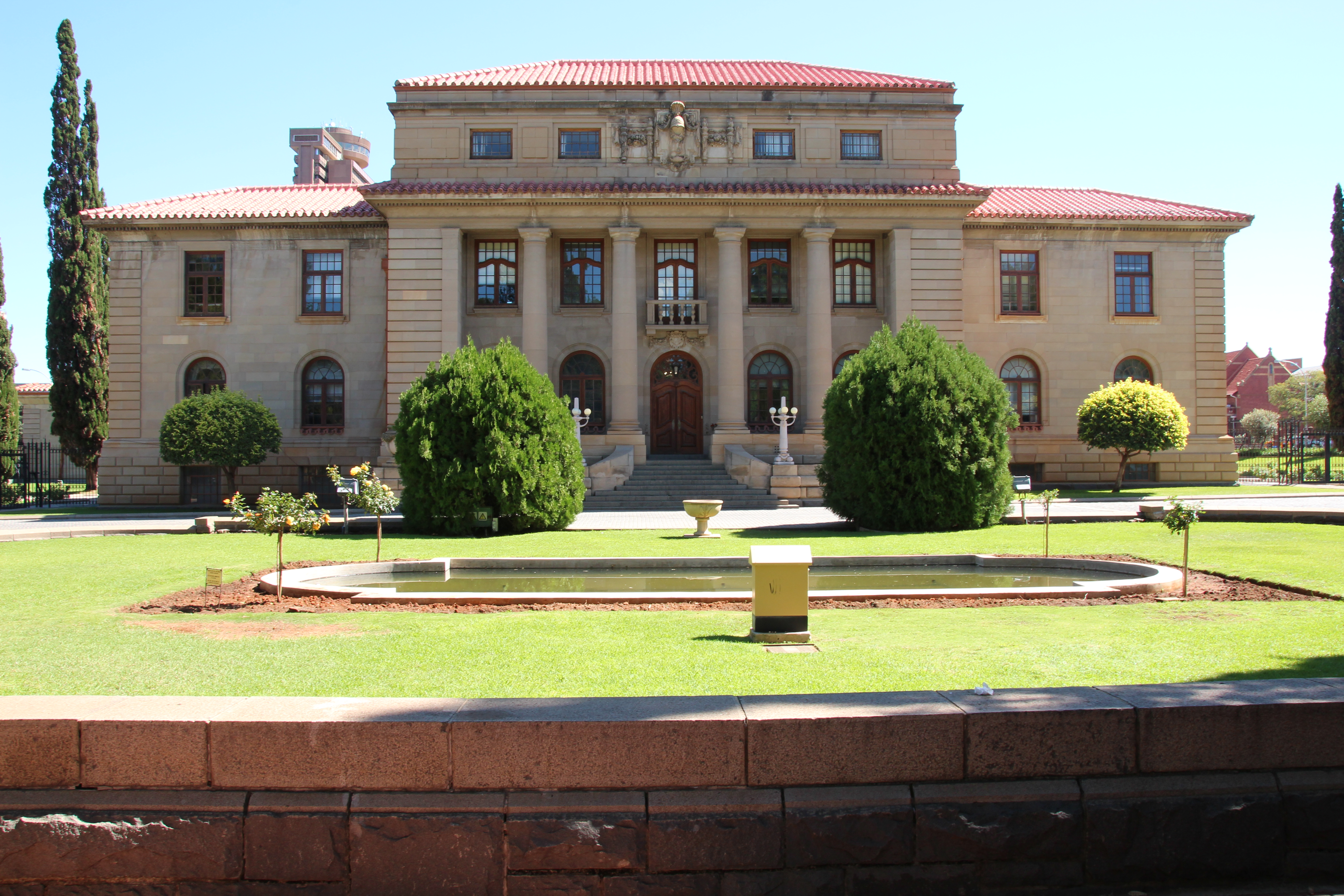
- Court: Supreme Court of Appeal (South Africa)
- Full case name: Standard Bank of South Africa Ltd v Saunderson and Others
- Decided: 15 December 2005
- Docket nos.: 358/05
- Citations: [2005] ZASCA 131; [2006] 2 All SA 382 (SCA); 2006 (9) BCLR 1022 (SCA); 2006 (2) SA 264 (SCA)

Case history
- Appealed from: High Court of South Africa, Cape of Good Hope Provincial Division – Standard Bank of South Africa Limited v Snyders and Others [2005] ZAWCHC 51
- Appealed to: Constitutional Court of South Africa – Campus Law Clinic (University of KwaZulu-Natal Durban) v Standard Bank of South Africa Ltd and Another [2006] ZACC 5

Court membership
- Judges sitting: Howie P, Cameron JA, Nugent JA, Jafta JA and Mlambo JA

Case opinions
- Decision by: Cameron and Nugent JJA (unanimous)

Standard Bank of South Africa Ltd v Saunderson and Others is an important case in South African property law and civil procedure. It was heard in the Supreme Court of Appeal on 23 November 2005 and decided on 15 December 2005. In a unanimous judgment written by Judges of Appeal Edwin Cameron and Robert Nugent, the court dealt with the proper application of Jaftha v Schoeman.

== Background ==
In the High Court of South Africa, Standard Bank had issued a summons against Saunderson, asking for a judgement on debt owing and ancillary orders declaring the mortgaged property to be executable. Saunderson failed to defend. The bank sought a default judgment under the Uniform Rules of Court, which provides that:

whenever a defendant is in default of delivery of notice of intention to defend or of a plea, the plaintiff, if he or she wishes to obtain judgment by default, shall file with the Registrar a written application for judgment against the defendant.

The registrar may then "grant judgment as requested."

The matter was dealt with in open court on the direction of the Deputy Judge President. The Cape High Court granted a default judgement, but the execution was declined. The court held that the effect of the registration of a mortgage bond is that the borrower, by his own volition, compromises his rights of ownership until the debt is repaid. The bond curtails the right of property at its root, penetrating the rights of ownership, for the bondholder's rights are fused into the title itself.

Relying on Jaftha v Schoeman, Judge André Blignaut of the High Court held that, since the mortgaged property was residential, the onus was on the bank to show that execution was permissible in terms of the Constitution: There should have been averments to the effect that the facts disclosed were sufficient to justify execution in terms of the right of access to adequate housing. The bank had to show that its applications were a justifiable limitation of that right. Because the summonses lacked such averments, they could not sustain an order of execution.

== Judgment ==
On appeal to the Supreme Court of Appeal, it was found that the court a quo had misdirected itself. In particular, the High Court had misinterpreted Jaftha. Jaftha did not find that all residential property was subject to section 26(1), and, moreover, the present situation was "radically different" to that in Jaftha: it involved a lack of judicial oversight, resulting in the debtor's being deprived of title to a home because of his failure to pay a "trifling extraneous debt," and the creditor was not a mortgagee with rights arising from an agreement. The court held that section 26(1) of the Constitution "does not confer a right of access to housing per se but only a right of access to 'adequate' housing," so that the right is "relative".

The court's order also included a practice direction instructing that, when a plaintiff claims relief embracing an order declaring immovable property executable, the summons initiating that action shall inform the defendant of his section 26(1) right and instruct that, "Should the defendant claim that the order for execution will infringe that right it is incumbent on the defendant to place information supporting that claim before the court." The court held that since most debtors do not defend cases, it is important that they be notified that the execution may infringe on their constitutional right of access to housing.

== See also ==
- Gundwana v Steko Development
