= Martin Reynolds =

Martin Reynolds may refer to:

- Martin Reynolds (athlete) (born 1949), British track and field athlete
- Martin Reynolds (civil servant), British civil servant
- Martin Reynolds (politician) (born 1950), Wisconsin politician and legislator

== See also ==
- Francis Martin Baillie Reynolds (born 1932), British legal scholar
