= Gundwana v Steko Development =

South African legal case

- Court: Constitutional Court of South Africa
- Full case name: Gundwana v Steko Development CC and Others
- Decided: 11 April 2011
- Docket nos.: CCT 44/10
- Citations: [2011] ZACC 14; 2011 (3) SA 608 (CC); 2011 (8) BCLR 792 (CC)

Case history
- Prior actions: Gundwna v Steko Development CC [2010] ZAWCHC 365 in the High Court of South Africa, Western Cape Division

Court membership
- Judges sitting: Moseneke DCJ, Cameron J, Froneman J, Jafta J, Khampepe J, Mogoeng J, Nkabinde J, van der Westhuizen J, Yacoob J and Mthiyane AJ

Case opinions
- Decision by: Froneman J (unanimous)

Gundwana v Steko Development CC and Others is an important case in South African property law and civil procedure. The Constitutional Court held unanimously that Registrars of the High Court are not constitutionally competent to authorise sales in execution of mortgaged homes when granting a default judgment. In such cases, the determination of executability requires judicial oversight, because it touches on the homeowner's right to housing under section 26 of the Constitution.

The judgment was handed down on 11 April 2011 by Justice Johan Froneman. Heavily indebted to the logic of Jaftha v Schoeman, it partly overturned the Supreme Court of Appeal's earlier holding in Standard Bank v Saunderson.

== Background ==
In 1995, Elsie Gundwana bought a property in Thembalethu with the assistance of a loan granted by Nedcor Bank (the second respondent) and secured through a mortgage bond on the property. When she fell into arrears in 2003, the Registrar of the High Court granted the bank, by default judgement, an order declaring her property to be executable. The bank did not take further action until 2007, when the property was sold in execution to Steko Development (the first respondent). In April 2008, Steko applied in the George Magistrate's Court for an order to evict Gundwana from the property. The eviction order was granted.

Gundwana sought to challenge the eviction order in the High Court, which dismissed the appeal, and then in the Supreme Court of Appeal, which refused leave to appeal. She also applied to the High Court for rescission of the 2003 execution order. Finally, she approached the Constitutional Court of South Africa, applying both for leave to appeal the eviction order and for direct access to challenge the constitutionality of the 2003 execution order. In particular, she challenged section 31(5)(b) of the Uniform Rules of Court, which empowered the High Court Registrar, when ordering default judgment, to declare immovable property to be specially executable. Gundwana's counsel, Anna-Marie de Vos, contended that it was unconstitutional for the Registrar to make such a declaration when it permitted the sale in execution of the home (primary residence) of a person.

== Judgment ==
Gundwana was granted direct access. Writing on behalf of a unanimous bench, Justice Johan Froneman held that it is unconstitutional for a High Court Registrar to declare immovable property to be specially executable when ordering default judgment under rule 31(5) "to the extent that this permits the sale in execution of the home of a person". Judicial oversight is required in such cases, because the execution of a person's home potentially infringes on the homeowner's right to housing under section 26 of the Constitution. Per Froneman:

I conclude that the willingness of mortgagors to put their homes forward as security for the loans they acquire is not by itself sufficient to put those cases beyond the reach of Jaftha. An evaluation of the facts of each case is necessary in order to determine whether a declaration that hypothecated property constituting a person’s home is specially executable, may be made. It is the kind of evaluation that must be done by a court of law, not the registrar. To the extent that the High Court Rules and practice allow the registrar to do so, they are unconstitutional.

The court remitted the matter to the High Court, which would adjudicate Gundwana's application for rescission of the execution order. It also set aside the eviction order and referred the application back to the Magistrate's Court, which would make a determination after the rescission application had been decided in the High Court.

== Consequences ==
The judgment overturned the findings of the Supreme Court of Appeal in Standard Bank v Saunderson, to the extent that the Supreme Court had found that the registrar was constitutionally competent to make execution orders when granting default judgment in terms of rule 31(5)(b).

With effect from 24 December 2010, the Uniform Rules of Court were amended to deal with the consequences of the Gundwana judgment:

(1)(a) No writ of execution against the immovable property of any judgment debtor shall issue until—

(i) a return shall have been made of any process which may have been issued against the movable property of the judgment debtor from which it appears that the said person has not sufficient movable property to satisfy the writ; or
(ii) such immovable property shall have been declared to be specially executable by the court or, in the case of a judgment granted in terms of rule 31(5), by the registrar: Provided that, where the property sought to be attached is the primary residence of the judgment debtor, no writ shall issue unless the court, having considered all the relevant circumstances, orders execution against such property.
