= South African Law Journal =

- Discipline: Law
- Language: English
- Edited by: Graham Glover

Publication details
- Former name: Cape Law Journal
- History: 1884-present
- Publisher: Juta Law
- Frequency: Quarterly

Standard abbreviations
- ISO 4: S. Afr. Law J.

Indexing
- ISSN: 0258-2503 (print); 1996-2177 (web)
- OCLC no.: 660153180

Links
- Journal homepage

The South African Law Journal is a quarterly law journal published by Juta & Co. It is South Africa's leading law journal and the second oldest law journal in the English-speaking world, after the University of Pennsylvania Law Review.

== History ==
The SALJ was established in Grahamstown in 1884, making it one year older than England's Law Quarterly Review and three years older than the Harvard Law Review. Its first 17 volumes were published under the title Cape Law Journal, before its name was changed to the South African Law Journal in 1901.

== Editors ==
The SALJ was edited for much of its history at the University of the Witwatersrand Law School, first by Bobby Hahlo, and then for a period of over forty years by Ellison Kahn. Its current managing editor is Graham Glover (Rhodes University). Its full list of managing editors is:

- William Henry Somerset Bell (1884-1896)
- Shepherd Kitchin (1896-1918)
- Robert Howes (1918-1937; honorary editor from 1937 to 1942)
- Cyril Hall (1943-1949)
- R G McKerron (1950-1958)
- Robert (Bobby) Hahlo (1950-1968)
- Ellison Kahn (1959-1999)
- Carole Lewis (2000-2001)
- Daniel Visser (2000-2009)
- Graham Glover (2010–present)

== Notable contributors ==
Notable foreign contributors to the SALJ include Lord Denning, Frank Michelman, Kent Roach, William Wade, and Reinhard Zimmermann. Notable South African-born contributors include Edwin Cameron, Arthur Chaskalson, Michael Corbett, Jacob de Villiers, John Dugard, Bob Hepple, Lord Hoffmann, Tony Honoré, Sydney Kentridge, John Gilbert Kotzé, Pius Langa, R. W. Lee, Harold Luntz, Dikgang Moseneke, Etienne Mureinik, Kate O'Regan, Oliver Schreiner, Barend van Niekerk, Raymond Wacks, and Rex Welsh. It was for his 1969 contribution to the SALJ that Barend van Niekerk was prosecuted for contempt of court by the apartheid government.

== See also ==
- South African law
