= Graham Glover =

South African Legal Academic

Graham Glover is a professor in the Faculty of Law at Rhodes University and the youngest-ever editor of the South African Law Journal. He teaches courses in the law of contract, sale, insurance, unjustified enrichment and also part of a course on Legal Skills.

== Career and research interests ==
Glover became a lecturing academic in the Faculty of Law at Rhodes in 1998. After receiving his PhD degree in 2004 for a thesis entitled The Doctrine of Duress in the Law of Contract and Unjustified Enrichment in South Africa, he was appointed senior lecturer in 2004, and in 2008 became an associate professor.

Glover's research interests are mainly in the field of contract law: He has published nineteen journal articles in this area of law, and delivered several conference papers at local and international conferences and colloquia. A protégé of the late AJ Kerr, he is co-author of the most recent editions of Kerr's The Principles of the Law of Contract and The Law of Sale and Lease. In 2006, he compiled and edited the book, Essays in Honour of AJ Kerr, a festschrift honouring Kerr's contribution to legal academia in South Africa.

Glover also contributes the chapter on "Divorce" to the Family Law Service. He was Technical Editor of the Speculum Juris Law Journal from 2003 to 2008, and joined the editorial team at the South African Law Journal (SALJ) as notes editor in 2009. With the departure of the two senior editors at the end of that year, the new editorial team requested of Glover that he take over the reins of the SALJ for an initial period of at least three years.

== Bibliography ==
- Essays in Honour of AJ Kerr. Lexis Nexis Butterworths, 2006.
- The Doctrine of Duress in the Law of Contract and Unjustified Enrichment in South Africa. Rhodes University, 2003.
- With Kerr, AJ. The Principles of the Law of Contract.
- —. The Law of Sale and Lease. Butterworth South Africa, 2004.
