= Cape Town & District Gas, Light & Coke v Director of Valuations =

South African legal case

Cape Town & District Gas, Light & Coke Co, Ltd v Director of Valuations is an important case in South African law. It was heard in the Cape Provincial Division by De Villiers JP and Searle J on August 5, 1949, with judgment on August 30. P. Charles appeared for the appellant and HG Lawrence KC for the respondent.

== Facts ==
In 1903, the appellant company had built, on a concrete foundation sunk four feet below surface level, a heavy steel structure for the purpose

1. of storing gas generated in a building some distance from it; and
2. of supplying such gas for consumption to the public.

The gas holder was not affixed to the soil by any mechanical means; its affixation was entirely due to its sheer weight resting upon the concrete foundation. It appeared that the company intended using it as long as it continued to function efficiently.

== Judgment ==
In an appeal under section 67 of Ordinance 26 of 1944 (Cape), the court held that the gasometer was immovable property. The court held further that it was a "structural improvement" within section 45(h) of the Ordinance, although quaere whether the structure was also a "building" within the meaning of sub-section (b) of section 45.

== See also ==
- Law of South Africa
- South African property law
