= Ikea Trading und Design v BOE Bank =

South African legal case

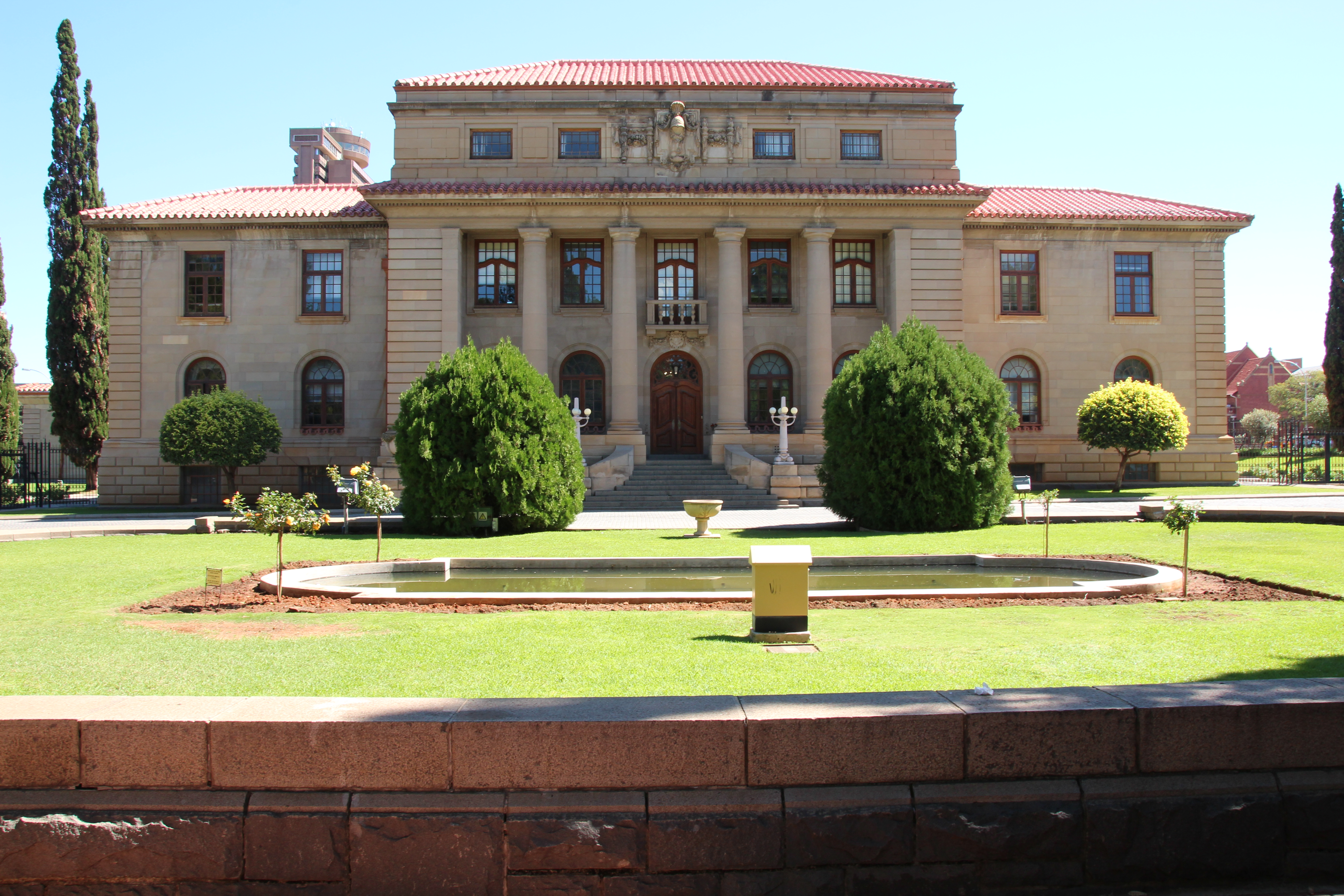
- Court: Supreme Court of Appeal (South Africa)
- Full case name: Ikea Trading und Design AG v BOE Bank Ltd
- Decided: 1 April 2004
- Docket nos.: 77/2003
- Citations: [2004] ZASCA 27; 2005 (2) SA 7 (SCA)

Court membership
- Judges sitting: Zulman JA, Farlam JA, Nugent JA, Lewis JA and Ponnan AJA

Case opinions
- Decision by: Lewis JA (unanimous)

Ikea Trading und Design AG v BOE Bank Ltd, an important case in South African property law, was decided in the Supreme Court of Appeal on 1 April 2004. It concerned the meaning of section 1(1) of the Security by Means of Movable Property Act, 1993, which specified the requirements for the registration of a special notarial bond over movable property. In a judgment written by Judge of Appeal Carole Lewis, the court held unanimously that section 1(1) required that the bond should specify and describe the relevant property in such a manner that the property is "readily recognisable" from that description alone, without reference to extrinsic evidence.

== Background ==
BOE Bank held a general covering notarial bond, passed in its favour by Woodlam CC over the assets of the latter. When Woodlam was placed in final liquidation in October 1999, it owed BOE Bank R2.4 million. BOE Bank applied to the High Court of South Africa for an order declaring that the liquidation and distribution account in respect of Woodlam had to be redrawn so as to reflect its preference by virtue of the notarial bond. The application was opposed by Woodlam's liquidators and by Ikea Trading and Decision, which in 1998 had registered in its favour a special bond over certain of Woodlam's assets; the prevailing liquidation and distribution account reflected the sum owing by Woodlam to Ikea as R2.6 million.

In the High Court, BOE Bank attacked the validity of Ikea's special bond on the basis that, though it was purportedly registered under section 1(1) of the Security by Means of Movable Property Act, 1993, it did not comply with the requirements of that section in specifying and describing the assets referred to in the bond in a manner that makes the assets "readily recognisable". BOE Bank therefore contended that the bond did not confer on Ikea real security over the items listed. While Ikea asserted that it was sufficient that the property listed in the special bond could be identified with the aid of extrinsic evidence, Ikea held that the property must be identifiable from the bond itself, without the aid of extrinsic evidence.

The High Court's Eastern Cape Division ruled in favour of BOE Bank, declaring that Ikea's bond did not render the relevant assets "readily recognisable". He directed the liquidators to redraw Woodlam's liquidation and distribution account and declared that BOE Bank's claim ranked ahead of Ikea's. Ikea appealed to the Supreme Court of Appeal, which heard the matter on 18 March.

== Judgment ==
It was clear to the court that, without reference to extrinsic evidence – such as invoices, other documents, or the intervention of a witness – the relevant items could not be identified as those listed in Ikea's bond. The court held that the bond had to specify and describe the property so as to render it readily recognisable. Nothing could be added to an instrument that had the effect of creating a real right that availed against third parties. The third party had to be able to identify the items by reference to the document alone, by correlating the descriptions contained therein with property fitting such descriptions.

The court held further that, in the instant case, the items enumerated in the bond had not been specified and described in the manner required by the Security by Means of Movable Property Act. It was not possible for third parties, even the liquidators, to take the bond and to correlate the descriptions with the assets on the premises. In the circumstances, the bond had failed to create a deemed pledge over the property of Woodham, with the result that the appellant was not a secured creditor. The appeal was thus dismissed, and the High Court's order was upheld.
