= Cooper v Die Meester =

South African legal case

Cooper NO en Andere v Die Meester en 'n Ander, an important case in South African property law, was heard in the Appellate Division on 7 November 1991, with judgment handed down on 5 March 1992.

== Judgment ==
The Insolvency Act contains an exhaustive list of priorities of statutory preferences on insolvency. The court found that a special notarial bond over specified movable property, when that property has remained in the possession of the mortgagor until the sequestration of his estate, is not included in this list and accordingly does not confer a statutory preference in favour of the mortgagee. It follows, held the court, that the mortgagee has no preference above other concurrent creditors in respect of the free residue.

The decision in the Orange Free State Provincial Division, in Cooper NO en Andere v Die Meester en 'n Ander, was thus reversed.

== See also ==
- South African property law
