= Ndlovu v Ngcobo =

South African legal case

Ndlovu v Ngcobo; Bekker and Another v Jika, an important case in South African property law, was heard in the Supreme Court of Appeal on May 23, 2002, with judgment handed down on August 30.

== Facts ==
The Prevention of Illegal Eviction from and Unlawful Occupation of Land Act gives "unlawful occupiers" some procedural and substantive protection against eviction from land. At the time of the launch of these two applications to evict, both occupiers had, according to the ordinary meaning in the Act, been "unlawful occupiers," as they had occupied land without consent. The question arose, however, as to whether "unlawful occupiers" were only those who had unlawfully taken possession of land—squatters, in other words—or whether the term included those who had at one stage enjoyed lawful possession but whose possession had subsequently become unlawful. To exclude such persons from the definition of "unlawful occupier" would necessitate an amendment to the definition to apply to a person who occupied land without the consent, express or tacit, of the owner or person in charge, or without any other right in law to occupy such land. It needed therefore to be considered whether or not there were indicators in the Act to justify such an emendation.

In neither Ndlovu nor Bekker had the applicants for eviction complied with the procedural requirements of the Act; the only issue for the Court to decide was whether or not they had been obliged to do so. As there was no appearance for the respondents, and as the appellants intended to argue the same issue from different perspectives, it was decided to hear their appeals concurrently.

=== Ndlovu ===
Ndlovu was a case of holding over in which the consent of the owner had lapsed: On the lawful termination of the tenant's lease, he had refused to vacate the property. The magistrate held that the Act did not apply to the circumstances of the case, and the High Court upheld this decision on appeal.

=== Bekker ===
In Bekker, a mortgage bond had been called up and the property sold in execution and transferred to the appellants. The erstwhile owner, however, refused to vacate. This was also, therefore, a case of holding over, although here the occupier, who had originally held qua owner, had never enjoyed the consent of the present owner. In an application for eviction in the High Court, the Judge raised mero motu the question of non-compliance with the Act, and subsequently dismissed the application. An appeal to a Full Bench was also dismissed.

The argument in Bekker was that, since the Legislature regarded the mortgagor as an unlawful occupier, it had to follow that the definition could not be restricted to persons who took occupation unlawfully.

== Judgment ==
In a majority judgment, Harms JA held that, by the very nature of things, a mortgagor, being an owner, could not be an unlawful occupier. Only once the property had been sold in execution and transferred to a purchaser could the possession of the erstwhile mortgagor or owner become unlawful. To call a mortgagor an "unlawful occupier" was not only incongruous but also absurd.

Harms also held that the Act distinguished between unlawful occupiers who had occupied for less than six months and those who had occupied for more than six months. The former had fewer rights, as the court, in considering the application for their eviction, did not have to consider whether or not land had been made available or could reasonably be made available for their relocation. In the event of a sale in execution over bonded property, however, those with less than six months' occupation received more protection, because the court had to have regard to the needs of the elderly, children, disabled persons and households headed by women, something it did not have to take into account in the case of those who had occupied for more than six months. Harms held further that the ordinary definition of the term meant, textually, that the Act applied to all "unlawful occupiers," irrespective of whether their possession had at an earlier stage been lawful.

There had clearly been a substantial class of persons whose vulnerability might have been a concern of Parliament when it enacted the legislation. The Bill of Rights and social or remedial legislation often conferred benefits on persons for whom they were not primarily intended. There seemed to be no reason in the general social and historical context of South Africa why the Legislature should not have wished to afford the vulnerable class of the landless poor the protection of the Act.

The landlord's problem with the affluent tenant, Harms found, was not so oppressive as at first it seemed. The tenant would obviously, to the annoyance of the landlord, be entitled to the somewhat cumbersome procedural advantages of the Act, but what it did was to delay or suspend the exercise of the landowner's full proprietary rights until a determination had been made as to whether or not it was just and equitable to evict the unlawful occupier, and under what conditions. This discretion was one in the wide, not the narrow, sense.

Harms added, however, that a court a quo did not have a free hand to do whatever it wished, and the court of appeal was not hamstrung by the traditional grounds of whether the court a quo had exercised its discretion capriciously or upon a wrong principle, or had not brought its unbiased judgment to bear on the question, or had acted without substantial reasons.

Provided that the procedural requirements had been met, Harms held that the owner was entitled to approach the court on the basis of ownership and the respondent's unlawful occupation. Unless the occupier opposed or disclosed circumstances relevant to the eviction order, the owner, in principle, would be entitled to an order for eviction.

Buildings or structures that did not perform the function of a form of dwelling or shelter for humans did not fall under the Act. Since juristic persons did not have dwellings, their unlawful possession was not protected by the Act.

Finally, it could not be discounted that Parliament had intended to extend the protection of the Act to cases of holding over of dwellings and the like. The Ndlovu appeal had therefore to succeed and the Bekker to fail. This was not to imply that the owners concerned would not be entitled to apply for and obtain eviction orders; it meant only that the procedures of the Act had to be followed.

== See also ==
- South African property law
