= AJ Kerr =

Alastair James Kerr (18 January 1922 in Biggar, South Lanarkshire, Scotland – 27 September 2010 in Grahamstown, South Africa) was an Advocate of the High Court of South Africa, Professor Emeritus and Fellow at Rhodes University, and one of South Africa's legal scholars.

== Life ==
Although "a proud Scot," Kerr spent most of his eighty-eight years in South Africa. He grew up at Fort Hare University, where his father, Alexander Kerr, was the founding principal, and registered for a Bachelor of Arts at what was then known as the Rhodes University College in 1939. He completed his postgraduate degree (LLB) at the University of the Witwatersrand in 1949, and returned to Rhodes as a lecturer in the department of law in 1955. Promoted to senior lecturer in 1958, he attained the rank of professor of law on 1 October 1968, and was head of the department of law from 1 June 1984 to 31 December 1987, and dean of the faculty from 1 June 1984, to 30 June 1990. He acted as vice-principal for three periods and as principal of the university for short periods when both the vice principal and principal were absent from Grahamstown.

On 8 February 1993, in recognition of his services to South African law, State President Frederik Willem de Klerk conferred on him letters patent, making Kerr then one of only eleven academic lawyers in South Africa to attain the honorary status of Senior Counsel. In recognition of his service to Rhodes, Kerr was awarded the degree of Doctor of Laws (honoris causa) in 1995, thus following in the footsteps of his father, who had been awarded an LLD (hc) by Rhodes in 1961. He retired in 1990 but retained an office in the faculty, remaining its most prolific author until, in 2010, the 71st year of his association with the university, he was hospitalised for heart surgery. On 27 September, Kerr sustained head injuries in a fall and died in Grahamstown.

Graham Glover, associate professor of law at Rhodes, and for many years Kerr's protégé, described him as "one of the most formidable intellects in the South African legal system" and "one of the country's leading authorities of the law of contract and customary law."

== Research interests ==
Kerr's research interests embraced contract, agency, sale, lease and customary law. His first two books were Native common law of immovable property in South Africa (1953) and The Native Law of Succession in South Africa (1961). These two works were later combined under the title The Customary Law of Immoveable Property and of Succession, which has run to three editions. In 1963, his jurisprudential work, Law and Justice, a Christian Exposition, was published.

Perhaps his best-known and most influential books are The Principles of the Law of Contract, now in its sixth edition (2002); The Law of Agency, his PhD thesis, now in its third edition (1991); and The Law of Lease (1969), which has been subsumed into a larger work entitled The Law of Sale and Lease, now in its third edition (2004). Kerr also wrote a smaller, two-volume work, Introduction to the Law of Contract (1994), now in its second edition, designed for commercial law students, as well as the preliminary note to the "Lease" section of The South African Encyclopaedia of Farms and Precedents other than Court Forms.

Kerr was also responsible for the chapter on "Customary Family Law" in Butterworths' Family Law Service (edited by Brigitte Clark), the contributions on Sale in The Law of South Africa (vol. XXIV, edited by Professor Willem A. Joubert) and the re-issue of that volume, along with the contributions on lease in the First Re-issue Vol 14 (the original text having been by JG Lötz). Kerr published well over 100 items in leading law journals and other periodicals.

== Bibliography ==
- Native common law of immovable property in South Africa: with an examination of legislation in force in the Ciskeian Territories of the Cape Province (Butterworths, 1953).
- Alastair James Kerr (1961). The native law of succession in South Africa: with special reference to the Nguni tribes of the Ciskeian and Transkeian Territories and Natal. Butterworth.
- Alastair James Kerr (1990). The customary law of immovable property and of succession. Grocott & Sherry. ISBN 978-0-620-15095-8.
- Alastair James Kerr (1963). Law and justice: a Christian exposition. Grocott & Sherry.
- Alastair James Kerr (2002). The Principles of the Law of Contract. Butterworths. ISBN 978-0-409-03755-5.
- Alastair James Kerr (1979). The Law of Agency. Butterworths. ISBN 978-0-409-03726-5.
- Alastair James Kerr (1969). The law of lease. Butterworths.
- Alastair James Kerr (2004). The Law of Sale and Lease. LexisNexis Butterworths. ISBN 978-0-409-03756-2.
- Introduction to the Law of Contract, vol. i (Grocott & Sherry, 1994).
