= Carole Lewis =

South African judge

Judge of the Supreme Court of Appeal
- In office 1 January 2003 – 2019
- Appointed by: Thabo Mbeki

Judge of the High Court
- In office 1 November 1999 – 31 December 2002
- Appointed by: Thabo Mbeki
- Division: Transvaal Provincial Division

Personal details
- Born: Carole Hélène Dyzenhaus; 26 October 1953 (age 72) Johannesburg, South Africa
- Spouse: Stephen Lewis
- Education: Witwatersrand University

Carole Hélène Lewis (née Dyzenhaus; born 26 October 1953) is a South African retired judge and legal academic. She served in the Supreme Court of Appeal from 2003 until her retirement in 2019. Before that, she was a judge of the Transvaal Provincial Division. Until her appointment to the bench in November 1999, she was a professor at the University of the Witwatersrand, where she was dean of the School of Law from 1993 to 1998.

== Early life and academic career ==
Lewis was born on 26 October 1953 in Johannesburg in the former Transvaal Province. She matriculated at the Hyde Park High School in Hyde Park, Johannesburg. Thereafter she attended the University of the Witwatersrand (Wits), where she completed a BA in law and Latin in 1973 and an LLB cum laude in 1975. During the final year of her degree, she received the Society of Advocates Prize for winning the moot competition.

After serving her articles of clerkship, Lewis was admitted as an attorney in 1978, but she joined the Wits School of Law as a lecturer later that year. She worked there for the next 20 years, during which time she completed her LLM cum laude at the same university in 1985. She was appointed as an associate professor in 1987, promoted to full professor in 1988, and served as dean of the Faculty of Law between 1993 and 1998. As an academic, she specialised in private law, especially contract law.

In addition to her academic work, she was the editor-in-chief of the Annual Survey of SA Law from 1992 to 1999 and general editor of the South African Law Journal in 2000. She served as a legal advisor to the Democratic Party during the negotiations to end apartheid and, after the 1994 general election, the post-apartheid Minister of Water Affairs, Kader Asmal, appointed her as an advisor on water law reform. She was also an acting judge in the High Court of South Africa in 1998 and 1999.

== Judicial career: 1999–2019 ==
Lewis joined the bench permanently on 1 November 1999 as a judge of the Transvaal Provincial Division of the High Court. She served there for three years, during which time she was an acting judge in the Supreme Court of Appeal in 2002.

In November 2002, President Thabo Mbeki announced that he would elevate her permanently to the Supreme Court of Appeal; she joined the bench on 1 January 2003, alongside her Transvaal Division colleague Tom Cloete. She was the second woman to be appointed to the appellate court, after Leonora van den Heever. Notable judgments written by Lewis included Ikea Trading und Design v BOE Bank and the judgment that was overturned by the Constitutional Court in S v Thebus.

== Retirement ==
Lewis retired in 2019. In May 2023, Stellenbosch University appointed her to chair an inquiry into allegations of nepotism by the university's vice-chancellor, Wim de Villiers.

== Personal life ==
She is married to Stephen Lewis and has two children. She joined the Black Sash as a teenager in 1970 and joined Lawyers for Human Rights shortly after it was formed in 1979.
