= Singh v Santam =

South African legal case

Singh v Santam Insurance Ltd, an important case in South African property law, was heard in the Appellate Division on 5 September 1996, with judgment handed down on 17 September.

== Facts ==
Ms Singh brought motion proceedings in a Local Division, claiming an order for the return of her vehicle, which was then in the possession of Santam.

The insurance company had issued a motor dealers' external risks policy to a firm owned by one "M." Singh's car was damaged in an accident in circumstances such that Santam was obliged to indemnify "M" under the policy. "M" submitted a claim form in respect of the damage, and Santam instructed a panelbeater to effect repairs and paid for them. When Santam later became aware that M had failed to pay any premiums, it cancelled the policy and, on 5 July, 1990 took the car while it was still in possession of the panelbeater.

Singh alleged that she was the owner of the car, and that Santam's possession was unlawful. The case hinged on Santam's claim that it had been impoverished and the appellant enriched to the extent of the payment to the panelbeater, and that it was accordingly entitled to retain possession under a lien operative against Singh.

The Local Division found for the appellant, whereafter a Full Bench of a Provincial Division found for Santam.

== Judgment ==
On appeal to the Appellate Division, the court pointed out that any lien the panelbeater might have had ended when Santam paid for the repairs. The court then held that the problem with the suggestion that Santam had acquired its own lien was that the expenditure in question had to occur while the party claiming the lien was in possession of the subject-matter; Santam, however, incurred no expenditure, and made no improvement to the car, after it took possession.

The suggestion that the panelbeater possessed the vehicle as an agent for Santam, and that Santam accordingly did acquire possession before 5 July, was not borne out by Santam's own affidavit, which stated that "M" had placed the panelbeater in possession of the car, that it was returned to him, and that Santam only later took possession. The mere fact that Santam had authorised the panelbeater to effect the repairs took the matter no further, because the panelbeater could at least as readily have done so while holding the car for "M" as for Santam.

Given that it was "M" who delivered the car, it was necessary for Santam to prove that there had been some form of attornment, a tripartite agreement between Santam, the panelbeater and "M" to the effect that, although the panelbeater had formerly held for "M," it would thereafter hold for Santam. There was, however, no attempt to prove such an attornment; accordingly, the attempt to establish possession prior to 5 July had to fail.

The court held further, with respect to the requirement that the possession upon which reliance was placed had to have been lawfully acquired, that this caused a further problem for the insurance company: It was difficult to understand what right Santam had to take possession of the car, or for that matter what right the panelbeater had to surrender it to Santam.

An enrichment lien, the court noted, could not exist in vacuo; it served merely to strengthen an underlying cause of action based on unjust enrichment. Even assuming that the impoverishment of Santam and the enrichment of Singh were established, it had not been sine causa. The facts in the instant case were akin to the second type of claim mentioned in Buzzard Electrical v Jan Smuts Avenue Investments, where the owner had contracted with "B" for improvements to his property, but where "B," instead of doing the work himself, had subcontracted it to "A," who sued the owner once the work was finished. In such a case, it was held, the owner's enrichment was not sine causa; it had its origin in the agreement with "B." The court found accordingly that, if Singh had been a party to the arrangements between "M" and Santam, her enrichment flowed from "M's" insurance policy, not from Santam's payment; if anyone was entitled to be enriched gratuitously, it was she.

Furthermore, even if the facts were not akin to type two in Buzzard, the question remained as to whether or not Singh's enrichment was unjust. It appeared that Santam had cancelled the policy by conscious choice only a fortnight after the payment to the panelbeater, so that payment was made pursuant to the policy. The court held that, even if the policy had perished automatically because of non-payment of the premiums, Santam's evidence indicated that it made payment in the belief that it was still alive. There was no evidence of error; even if there had been, it would have been unfair to visit the consequences on Singh, the party entitled to have her car repaired for nothing. Accordingly, the court added, it could well be that Santam's claim to a lien should founder also for lack of an underlying enrichment action.

The upshot was that Santam had not proved an enrichment lien, and that Singh, as owner, was entitled to the return of her car. The decision in the Transvaal Provincial Division, in Santam Insurance Ltd v Devi was reversed.

== See also ==
- South African property law
