= Vasco Dry Cleaners v Twycross =

South African legal case

Vasco Dry Cleaners v Twycross is a classic case in South African property law, and illustrative of the courts' treatment of simulated transactions. It was heard in the Appellate Division (then the highest court of appeals in South Africa) on 28 August 1978, with judgment handed down on 16 November.

== Facts ==
In 1967, "C" sold his dry-cleaning business, Vasco Dry Cleaners, to AC (Pty) Ltd, which was controlled by "D." A term of the contract of sale stipulated that, in respect of the dry-cleaning machinery, the passing of ownership would be suspended until the purchase price, to be paid in instalments, had been met in full; in the meantime, ownership remained with "C."

Before the final instalment had been paid, AC ran into financial difficulties, and "D" approached "T" for help. "T" agreed to purchase the dry-cleaning machines from AC and pay the price directly to "C." "T" also entered into another agreement with AC whereby "T" resold the machines to AC at exactly same purchase price, in instalments. No actual delivery took place, and AC remained in control of the machines.

AC later sold and delivered the machines to Vasco without paying all the instalments due to "T," who then claimed the machines from Vasco on the ground that they were the owners because they had paid "C" and taken delivery first by means of traditio brevi manu, and then from AC by constitutum possessorium.

== Judgment ==
The court found that this constituted a simulated transaction. This was evident from the fact, inter alia, that "D" did not want dispose of the machines, that "T" did not need the machines, and that the sale was based not on market value but on the purchase price. The parties did not intend to enter into sale and resale; they intended to create a pledge.

== See also ==
- South African property law
