= Bloemfontein Municipality v Jacksons =

South African legal case

Bloemfontein Municipality Appellant v Jacksons Limited Respondent is an important case in South African property law. Heard in the Appellate Division in Bloemfontein on March 15 and April 5, 1929, it established the principle that, where a third party has not taken reasonable steps to protect his property from the lessor's tacit hypothec, the courts will infer that the property was brought onto the leased premises with the implied knowledge and consent of that party.

== Facts ==
"S" bought furniture under a hire-purchase agreement from Jacksons, whereby the latter reserved ownership until payment of the last instalment. "S" subsequently moved to Bloemfontein and leased a house from the municipality. When "S" fell in arrears of rent, the municipality attached the furniture. Jacksons applied for an order that the furniture was not subject to the lessor's tacit hypothec; in other words, that the furniture had been brought to the premises without Jacksons's consent.

== Judgment ==
The court held that the furniture was indeed subject to the lessor's tacit hypothec. Had Jacksons taken reasonable steps to protect its property and to enquire as to its whereabouts, and as to where the purchaser was living, it could not have failed to obtain the necessary information, enabling it to give due notice to the new landlord. It had ample time to do this; under the circumstances, the inevitable inference was that the company had impliedly consented to the furniture's being subject to the tacit hypothec of the landlord. The furniture, therefore, had rightly been attached in execution.

== See also ==
- South African property law
