= Law Quarterly Review =

- Discipline: Law
- Language: English
- Edited by: Ewan Mckendrick

Publication details
- History: 1885–present
- Publisher: Sweet & Maxwell (England and Wales)
- Frequency: Quarterly

Standard abbreviations
- ISO 4: Law Q. Rev.

Indexing
- ISSN: 0023-933X
- LCCN: 06020523
- OCLC no.: 01755607

Links
- Journal homepage

The Law Quarterly Review is a peer-reviewed academic journal covering common law throughout the world. It was established in 1885 and is published by Sweet & Maxwell. It is one of the leading law journals in the United Kingdom.

== History ==
The LQR's founding editor was Frederick Pollock, then Corpus Professor of Jurisprudence at the University of Oxford. Founded in 1885, it is one of the oldest law journals in the English-speaking world, after only the University of Pennsylvania Law Review and the South African Law Journal. The editors' intention was that the journal would help to establish law as a worthy field of academic study. In this purpose it has "triumphed". In the first volume alone its contributors included, in addition to Pollock himself, Sir William Anson, Albert Venn Dicey, and Thomas Erskine Holland, each of whom had assisted in the founding of the journal, as well as Oliver Wendell Holmes, F. W. Maitland, T. E. Scrutton (later Lord Justice), James Fitzjames Stephen, and Paul Vinogradoff.

== Editors ==
Pollock edited the LQR for its first 35 years (1885–1919). He was succeeded by A. E. Randall, then editor of Leake's Law of Contracts. When Randall died suddenly in April 1925, Pollock returned to edit the final two issues of that year. From 1926 the editorship was taken over by A. L. Goodhart, who stayed in that position for almost half a century. In 1971 Paul Baker succeeded to the editorship and in 1987 he was replaced by Francis Reynolds. He was replaced by Peter Mirfield (University of Oxford) until 2025, when Professor Ewan McKendrick KC (3 Verulam Buildings) took over as editor.
