= Mlombo v Fourie =

South African legal case

Mlombo v Fourie is an important and contentious case in South African property law. It was heard before Trollip J in the Transvaal Provincial Division on May 29, 1964.

== Facts ==
Mlombo, the owner of the property, instituted the rei vindicatio action against Fourie for having fraudulently ceased to possess it.

== Judgment ==
The court ordered Fourie to make good the value of the lost property.

== Criticism ==
The decision has been criticised by legal commentators for having blurred the distinction between the rei vindicatio and the actio ad exhibendum. The rei vindicatio, or vindicatory action, is a remedy available to an owner to reclaim his property, from wherever it is found and from whosoever is holding it, entitling him to "exclusive possession." The true application of the remedy is aimed merely at restoring proprietary interest; it does not include damages. The actio ad exhibendum, which is a delictual remedy, usually does include a claim for damages. By awarding damages in terms of the rei vindicatio, which is a restorative proprietary remedy, the court failed to appreciate this distinction.

== See also ==
- South African property law
