= Thienhaus v Metje & Ziegler =

South African legal case

Thienhaus NO v Metje & Ziegler Ltd and Another is an important case in South African property law. It was heard in the Appellate Division, by Steyn CJ, Van Blerk JA, Ogilvie Thompson JA, Williamson JA and Wessels JA, on 22 February 1965, with judgment handed down on 1 April.

== Facts ==
G owed money to M, the respondent. The debt was secured by a mortgage on property belonging to B, in favor of M. However, there was an error in the wording of the mortgage bond, as it incorrectly stated that the debt was owed by SG, who happened to be the sole shareholder of G.

When B became insolvent, T was appointed as the liquidator. M sought a preferential right based on the mortgage bond, but this claim was rejected by T on the grounds that, due to the factual inaccuracy in the mortgage bond, the mortgage had not come into existence.

== Judgment ==
The court held, firstly, that a mortgage bond may be used both as an instrument of hypothecation and also as a record of debt, and secondly that it is matter of custom in drafting mortgage bonds to incorporate an admission of liability by the mortgagor to facilitate a quick and easy remedy.
