= Kilburn v Estate Kilburn =

South African legal case

Kilburn Appellant v Estate Kilburn Respondent, an important case in South African property law, was heard in the Appellate Division on 15 and 29 September, 1931.

== Facts ==
For a mortgage to be valid, there must be a legal or natural obligation to which the hypothecation is accessory. In Kilburn, a husband had, before his marriage, passed and registered a notarial bond for £500 as a second charge on all his property in favour of his wife.

== Judgment ==
The court found as a fact that, although the bond purported to secure a sum of £500 which the husband had verbally promised to pay his wife, it was not a serious promise, and there was therefore no intention to pay that sum. The intention of the spouses, in agreeing to the notarial bond, was only to give a preferential claim on the sum if the husband were to be declared insolvent.

The principal debt was invalid, and so, in turn, was the notarial bond. As, therefore, there was no legal obligation secured by the bond, the wife could not, on the insolvency of her husband, claim in a concursus creditorum on the bond. The decision of the court a quo (in the Natal Provincial Division) in Kilburn v Estate Kilburn was thus confirmed.

== See also ==
- South African property law
