= Magistrates' Courts Act =

Stock short title used for UK legislation

Magistrates' Courts Act (with its variations) is a stock short title used for legislation in the United Kingdom relating to magistrates' courts.

The Bill for an Act with this short title may have been known as a Magistrates' Courts Bill during its passage through Parliament.

Magistrates' Courts Acts may be a generic name either for legislation bearing that short title or for all legislation which relates to magistrates courts.

== List ==
=== United Kingdom ===
There are no Magistrates' Courts in Scotland, although there are Justice of the Peace Courts, which replaced District Courts in 1975.

The Magistrates' Courts Act 1952 (15 & 16 Geo. 6 & 1 Eliz. 2. c. 55)
The Magistrates' Courts Act 1957 (5 & 6 Eliz. 2. c. 29)
The Magistrates' Courts (Appeals From Binding Over Orders) Act 1956 (4 & 5 Eliz. 2. c. 44)
The Metropolitan Magistrates' Courts Act 1959 (7 & 8 Eliz. 2. c. 45)
The Domestic Proceedings and Magistrates' Courts Act 1978 (c. 22)
The Magistrates' Courts Act 1980 (c. 43)
The Police and Magistrates' Courts Act 1994 (c. 29)
The Magistrates' Courts (Procedure) Act 1998 (c. 15)

== See also ==
List of short titles
