= Tom Cloete =

South African judge

Judge of the Supreme Court of Appeal
- In office 1 January 2003 – 16 May 2013
- Appointed by: Thabo Mbeki

Judge of the Supreme Court
- In office 15 December 1991 – 31 December 2002
- Appointed by: F. W. de Klerk
- Division: Transvaal

Personal details
- Born: Thomas Dante Cloete; 15 May 1948 (age 77) Johannesburg, Transvaal; Union of South Africa
- Spouse: Janet Ritchie
- Parent: Johannes Dante Cloete
- Education: St Andrew's Preparatory School; St Andrew's College
- Alma mater: Rhodes University; University of Oxford

Thomas Dante Cloete (born 15 May 1948) is a South African retired judge who served in the Supreme Court of Appeal from January 2003 until his retirement in May 2013. Formerly an advocate and Senior Counsel in Johannesburg, he was appointed to the bench in 1991 as a judge of the Transvaal Provincial Division (later the Gauteng High Court).

== Early life and education ==
Cloete was born on 15 May 1948 in Johannesburg. His family moved to Grahamstown in the Eastern Cape in 1954, where his father, Johannes Dante Cloete, was Senior Counsel and later the Judge President of the Eastern Cape Division of the Supreme Court of South Africa.

He attended St Andrew's Preparatory School and St Andrew's College in Grahamstown, matriculating in 1965, and went on to Rhodes University, where he completed a BA in 1969. From 1969 to 1972, he attended Oxford University on a Rhodes Scholarship, completing his BA in jurisprudence. Thereafter he returned to Grahamstown to study toward his LLB at Rhodes, graduating cum laude in 1974. He clerked for his father at the Supreme Court while reading for his LLB, and he was captain of the smallbore shooting team at St Andrew's, Rhodes, and Oxford.

== Legal career ==
In 1976, Cloete was admitted as an advocate of the Johannesburg Bar, where he practised law for the next 15 years. He also practised in Botswana, where he was admitted as an advocate in 1979. In South Africa, he took silk in 1989.

== Gauteng High Court: 1991–2002 ==
On 15 December 1991, Cloete was appointed to the bench of the Supreme Court as a judge of the Transvaal Provincial Division, which became the Gauteng Division of the High Court after the end of apartheid. During his 11 years' service on that court, sitting in Johannesburg, Cloete became the senior judge on the Witwatersrand Local Division circuit of the commercial court. He was also an acting judge in Swaziland's high court in 1994.

== Supreme Court of Appeal: 2003–2013 ==
In November 2002, President Thabo Mbeki announced that Cloete and Carole Lewis would be elevated to the Supreme Court of Appeal with effect from 1 January 2003. Cloete served in the appellate court for just over a decade, during which time he was also an ad hoc judge of appeal in the Seychelles in 2003. His notable judgements include Du Plessis v Road Accident Fund, an early judgement on the rights of same-sex partners.

== Personal life and retirement ==
Cloete retired on 16 May 2013 at the age of 65. He is a trustee of Taco Kuiper's Valley Trust and often serves on the judging panel of the Taco Kuiper Award for Investigative Journalism.

He is married to Janet Ritchie, with whom he has two children. He is a Freemason.
