= Parate execution =

Parate execution (Dutch parate executie) (also the parate for short) is a practical foreclosure procedural law which allows the sale of mortgaged properties without going through legal and formal court proceedings. Hence this procedure is known as a non-court procedure. This execution has been popularly executed in Sri Lanka and has been vital in the country's law. Parate execution can be executed only by the licensed commercial banks of Sri Lanka which are governed by the Banking Act no 30 of 1988. The purpose of the procedure is to help the banking sector to recover the loans in the event of default.

Under this procedure, the banks can acquire the property of borrowers but they can't afford to gain the ownership of the property. The mortgaged properties are transferred in the name of the bank at a nominal price if it is not sold in the market. Nonetheless, the bank is require to re-sell the property for adjustments of its dues and refund of excess money to borrowers. Banks cannot auction any third party property mortgage under any circumstances as per the provisions.

The Cabinet of Ministers of Sri Lanka, on 26th February 2024, at its meeting agreeing to temporarily suspend highly contentious parate action till 15 December 2024. the Cabinet meeting chaired by President Ranil Wickremesinghe approved a proposal submitted by justice minister Dr. Wijeyadasa Rajapakshe.
