= Francis Reynolds (legal scholar) =

English legal scholar (born 1932)

Francis Martin Baillie Reynolds KC FBA (born 11 November 1932) is a British retired legal scholar. He was Professor of Law at the University of Oxford from 1992 to 2000, and a fellow of Worcester College, Oxford from 1960 to 2000.

Reynolds was educated at Winchester College and Worcester College, Oxford, and was admitted to the Bar of the Inner Temple.

He specialises in international commercial law – international sales, carriage by sea, parts of the conflict of laws and the law of agency. He is the standing editor of Bowstead and Reynolds on Agency and was the editor-in-chief of the Law Quarterly Review. Reynolds is also a contributing editor to Carver on Bills of Lading and Benjamin's Sale of Goods.

He is also a Fellow of the British Academy (FBA), an Honorary King's Counsel and an Honorary Bencher of the Inner Temple.
