= Reservation of Separate Amenities Act, 1953 =

Part of the former system of racial segregation in South Africa

Parliament of South Africa
- Long title: Act to provide for the reservation of public premises and vehicles or portions thereof for the exclusive use of persons of a particular race or class, for the interpretation of laws which provide for such reservation, and for matters incidental thereto.
- Citation: Act No. 49 of 1953
- Enacted by: Parliament of South Africa
- Enacted: 9 October 1953
- Royal assent: 5 October 1953
- Commenced: 9 October 1953
- Repealed: 15 October 1990

Repealed by
- Discriminatory Legislation regarding Public Amenities Repeal Act, 1990
- Status: Repealed

The Separate Amenities Act, Act No 49 of 1953, formed part of the apartheid system of racial segregation in South Africa. The Act legalized the racial segregation of public premises, vehicles and services. Only public roads and streets were excluded from the Act. Section 3b of the Act stated that the facilities for different races did not need to be equal, while Section 3a made it legal not only to supply segregated facilities, but also to completely exclude people, based on their race, from public premises, vehicles or services. In practice the best facilities were reserved for whites while those for other races were inferior.

== Background ==
=== Prior to 1953 ===
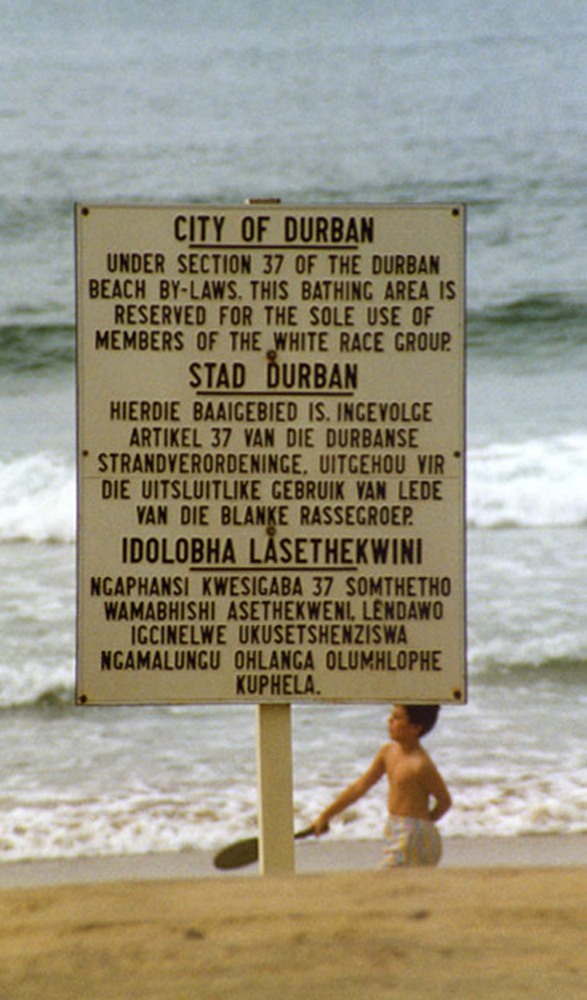
Durban beach sign in English, Afrikaans, and Zulu, declaring the beach "Whites only"

Before the enactment of the Act in 1953, the courts in South Africa applied common law in the absence of any other law to challenges concerning race and use of amenities, basing their decision on the presumption of equality between the different races in the country.

R v. Plaatjies 1910 prevented a municipality from separating races at a swimming stream. In 1915, Williams and Adendorf v. Johannesburg Municipality prevented trams in the city from being segregated. In 1934, Minister of Posts and Telegraph v. Rasool held that the former could not a create greater right for one race versus another, in this case at a postal facility, through segregation. And in 1950, an Indian taxi driver challenged and won when his licence to drive white passengers was stripped from him, in Tayah v. Ermelo Local Transportation Board.

Segregation at railway stations was challenged several times in court. In R. v. Abduraham 1950, the court found in the favour of the defendant when it was established that by providing White European only signs, the railways had discriminated in the application of a 1916 railways act against non-whites for not providing an area where they could get away from White Europeans. When facilities were provided and found to be inferior to White Europeans, as was challenged in R. v. Lusa 1953, the courts found the railways could not provide unequal treatment.

The Reservation of Separate Amenities Act would therefore be introduced and enacted in parliament to bring certainty to the right to have separate amenities protected by a law, giving those reserving areas for different races the legal right not to provide an alternative service or facility for other races.

=== Introduction of the bill ===
The bill was brought to parliament in 1953, by C. R. Swart, Minister for Justice, with its main purpose to reduce contact between Whites and non-Whites in social settings. He was quoted in Hansard stating:

If a European has to sit next to a non-European at school, if on a railway station they are to use the same waiting rooms, if they are continually to travel together on the trains and sleep in the same hotels, it is evident that eventually we would have racial admixture, with the result that on the one hand one would no longer find a purely European population and on the other hand a non-European population.

— Hansard 1953 col. 1053.

He made it clear in a further statement before parliament that the government's legislation would end all further court action to apply equality of amenities to all the races in South Africa:

It was never the intention of Parliament to say…that if you reserve something for one group, equal provision should be made in every respect for the other group. In our country we have civilised people, we have semi-civilised people and we have uncivilised people. The Government of this country gives each section facilities according to the circumstances of each.

— Hansard 1953 cols. 1054-5.

The Act was reinforced and supported by several other Apartheid laws that ensured social segregation. The Group Areas Act defined that the word 'occupation of a particular area set aside for Whites', meant excluding non-whites from restaurants, tea rooms, eating rooms, and clubs. Liquor Act, 1928 amended 1977, required a special permit to allow different races to drink together. The Motor Transport Act, amended in 1955, required taxis and buses to have certificates stating what races could be conveyed. The State-Aided Institution Act, amended in 1957, granted boards of intuitions funded by the state, the right to determine the hours, conditions, and restrictions of their venues for use by non-whites, and covered libraries, museums, art galleries, public parks, and zoos.

Municipalities quickly made use of the Act to pass by-laws that reserved certain areas for whites only.

A notable exception to the segregation that was implemented following the Act was the Johannesburg Zoo and Zoo Lake. Due to requirements in the "Deed of Gift", under which the land for the zoo and lake was acquired, segregation was not permitted and consequently, the zoo and public park where the lake is located were open to all races from the time they were established.

== Modifications to the act ==
In 1960, an amendment to the Act was made when beach segregation was introduced. It enabled local authorities to make beaches and the adjacent sea exclusive to certain races.

Interpretations and modifications to the spirit of the Act were made by the government starting in 1970's and early eighties but were subject still, in some cases, to decisions made by Provincial Authorities, Department of Community Development, and local authorities. Some of the changes were:

=== Libraries ===
Prior to 1979, public libraries were segregated but after that year, local authorities could open them to all races.

=== Hospitals ===
Separate public hospitals were created for different races, but private hospitals had their own discretion as to who they admitted.

=== Theatres and halls ===
After 1979, a permanent permit could be granted to allow multi-race audiences at theatres, prior to that, temporary permits had to be applied for. However, separate entrances, seating, toilets, and refreshment areas still applied for non-white audiences.

=== Clubs ===
Permits could be applied for to be granted "International status" to serve non-white customers. By 1979, clubs could decide who could be members.

=== Cinemas ===
In 1957, small cinemas could seat non-whites in separate seating if they obtained a permit. By 1978, drive-inns could apply to for a permit to be open to all races. Finally in 1983, cinemas could apply for multi-racial status.

=== Restaurants and hotels ===
Hotels granted an "International status" were able to accommodate and serve non-whites. Dancing between races in those hotels were restricted until 1982. Swimming pools were open only to white and non-white guests at that time. By March 1985, it was acknowledged that restrictions like these were being ignored by the government. Restaurants required the same "International status" to serve non-whites and then from January 1985, relaxed.

=== Government facilities and buildings ===
From 1976, post offices began removing their separate facilities with only twenty percent still separate in 1985. Game parks, nature reserves and pleasure resort run by the state were said to have become multi-racial in the 1970s.

=== Parks ===
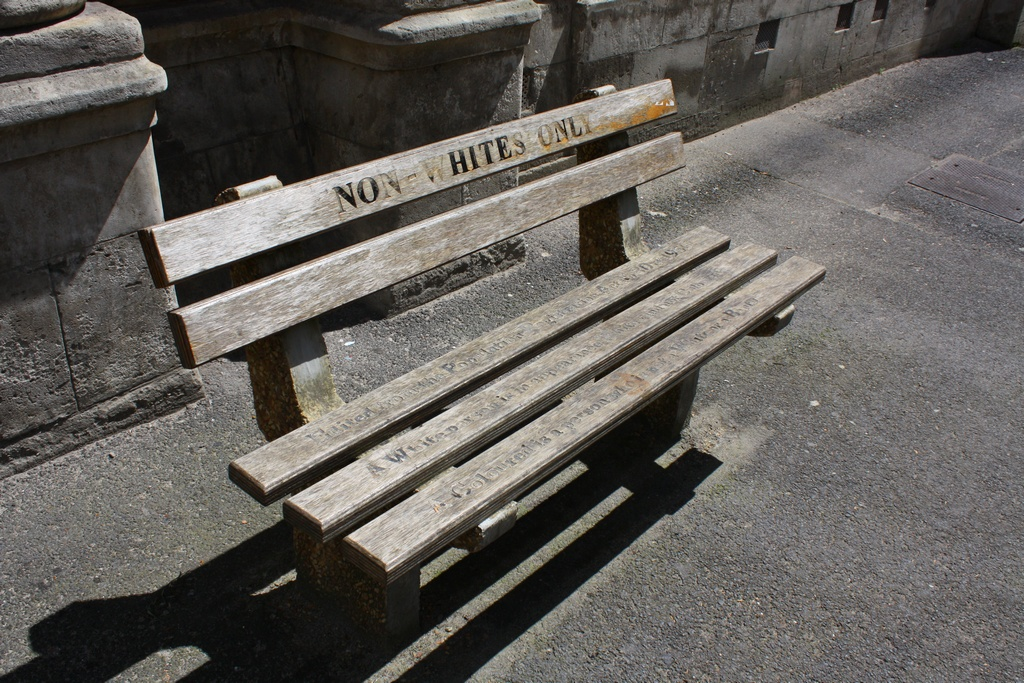
The non-whites-only bench outside Cape Town High Court is an example of how public amenities were segregated according to race.

In areas reserved for whites under the Group Areas Act, parks could only be used by Black domestic workers accompanied by white children.

=== Beaches ===
Beaches were segregated according to race and individual beaches were reserved for certain races as determined by provincial authorities and not the local authority. The Act stated that equal facilities were not required. There were two exceptions. Temporary permits could be granted and Black domestic workers caring for white children were allowed on whites-only beaches. On 16 November 1989, President F.W. de Klerk ordered that beaches be opened to all races and that local authorities amend their by-laws.

== Demise of the Act and the road to its repeal ==
=== Preliminary developments ===
On 31 October 1984, State President P.W. Botha instructed his President's Council to investigate consolidating the Group Areas, Reservation of Separate Amenities, Slums, and the Community Development Acts. The Council reported back on 10 September 1987, recommending no consolidation but expressed a number of recommendations. One was that the Reservation of Separate Amenities Act needed to be repealed.

On 5 October 1987, State President P.W. Botha announced before the House of Assembly that the President's Council had recommended the repeal of the Separate Amenities Act. He stated that the law would not be repealed before alternative policy guidelines were approved. He stated that if the law was repealed with nothing else in its place, the situation would revert to events before 1953 and that common law would prevail. While stating he was wasn't blind to a reality of a multiracial society, he had to consider the wishes of those in their communities who wished to use their own institutions. He stated that some amenities would have to be used by all races however that a just and balanced solution was required and acknowledged that the Act, had never been a success.

In February 1988, the South African Police were ordered by the Commissioner of Police to no longer arrest people breaking the law concerning the Separate Amenities Act. Their names could be taken and referred to the state prosecutor's office.

By November 1988, the local governments in the Transvaal, governed by the Conservative Party, reintroduced and enforced the segregation laws enabled by the Separate Amenities Act. Their actions were condemned by white opposition parties and local governments and calls were made to the National Party to have the law repeals.

On 16 November 1989, President FW de Klerk announced that it was time to repeal the act, and that he would do so after discussions about its implications and measures implemented. One aspect of the law, he could instantly change was opening beaches to all races. The proposal to repeal that act was recognised by the President's Council back in 1987.

The proposed repeal and the opening of beaches were immediately condemned by the Conservative Party, with Koos van der Merwe, Chief Information Officer, calling the move a path to a mixed South Africa and a Black government. The Democratic Party expressed support for the move and a move towards a negotiated constitution. The Mass Democratic Movement described it as a step forward. Mangosuthu Buthelezi, Inkatha Freedom Party, described it as an indication de Klerk wanted to bring about change and the repeal would be a point of no return. Boerestaat Party leader Robert van Tonder described it as step backwards and would create a third world, socialist, English speaking African state and called for a separate state for Afrikaaners.

=== Repeal ===
On 20 June 1990, the South African Parliament voted to repeal the Act, and on 15 October 1990, it was finally repealed by the Discriminatory Legislation regarding Public Amenities Repeal Act.
