= Discriminatory Legislation regarding Public Amenities Repeal Act, 1990 =

1990 South African law repealing previous segregation laws

Parliament of South Africa
- Long title: Act to repeal or amend certain laws so as to do away with certain powers to differentiate between persons of different races; and to provide for matters connected therewith.
- Citation: Act No. 100 of 1990
- Enacted by: Parliament of South Africa
- Assented to: 28 June 1990
- Commenced: 15 October 1990

Repeals
- Reservation of Separate Amenities Act, 1953
- Status: Spent

The Discriminatory Legislation regarding Public Amenities Repeal Act, 1990 (Act No. 100 of 1990) is an act of the Parliament of South Africa that repealed legislation permitting racial segregation in public facilities: principally the Reservation of Separate Amenities Act, 1953 and the Reservation of Separate Amenities Amendment Act, 1960, but also related sections of other acts as well as provincial ordinances.

Because the act only repeals other legislation, it is a spent law. Racial discrimination in public facilities is now prohibited by section nine of the Constitution and by the Promotion of Equality and Prevention of Unfair Discrimination Act, 2000.
