= Chapter Two of the Constitution of South Africa =

South African Bill of Rights

Chapter Two of the Constitution of South Africa contains the Bill of Rights, a human rights charter that protects the civil, political and socio-economic rights of all people in South Africa. The rights in the Bill apply to all law, including the common law, and bind all branches of the government, including the national executive, Parliament, the judiciary, provincial governments, and municipal councils. Some provisions, such as those prohibiting unfair discrimination, also apply to the actions of private persons.

== History ==
South Africa's first bill of rights was drafted primarily by Kader Asmal and Albie Sachs in 1988 from Asmal's home in Dublin, Ireland. The text was eventually contained in Chapter 3 of the transitional Constitution of 1993, which was drawn up as part of the negotiations to end apartheid. This "interim Bill of Rights", which came into force on 27 April 1994 (the date of the first non-racial election), was largely limited to civil and political rights (negative rights). The current Bill of Rights (Tswana: molaotlhomo wa ditshwanelo; Sotho: bili ya ditokelo; Northern Sotho: molao wa ditokelo; Afrikaans: handves van regte; Zulu: umqulu wamalungelo; Southern Ndebele: ivikelamalungelo; Xhosa: usomqulu wamalungelo; Swazi: umculu wemalungelo; Venda: mulayo wa pfanelo dza vhathu; Tsonga: nxaxamelo wa timfanelo), which replaced the interim Bill of Rights on 4 February 1997 (the commencement date of the final Constitution), retained all of these rights and added a number of new positive economic, social and cultural rights.

== Application of the Bill of Rights ==
§7: This Bill of Rights is a cornerstone of democracy in South Africa. It enshrines the rights of all people in our country and affirms the democratic values of human dignity, equality and freedom. The state must respect, protect, promote and fulfil the rights in the Bill of Rights. The rights in the Bill of Rights are subject to the limitations contained or referred to in section 36, or elsewhere in the Bill.

The extent of the jurisdiction and application of the Bill of Rights is delineated by sections 7 and 8, the bill's opening sections, which are titled "Rights" and "Application" respectively. Section 7 entrenches the Bill of Rights as a "cornerstone of democracy in South Africa" and requires the state to "respect, protect, promote and fulfil the rights in the Bill of Rights", though it also notes that rights are subject to limitation.

=== Rights-bearers ===
==== Natural persons ====
According to section 7(1), the Bill of Rights "enshrines the rights of all people in our country". The text of specific provisions grants most rights to "everyone", with the exception of some rights that are expressly restricted to smaller groups of beneficiaries (most usually to South African citizens). In the case of rights granted to "everyone", the Constitutional Court held in Khosa v Minister of Social Development that section 7(1) implies that the word "everyone" should be read literally, meaning that such rights are extended to foreign citizens inside South Africa and not only to citizens. (Note: Khosa and Others v Minister of Social Development and Others, Mahlaule and Another v Minister of Social Development (CCT 13/03, CCT 12/03) [2004] ZACC 11; 2004 (6) SA 505 (CC); 2004 (6) BCLR 569 (CC).)

==== Juristic persons ====
Certain constitutional rights are extended to juristic persons as well as to natural persons. Section 8(4) provides explicitly that, "A juristic person is entitled to the rights in the Bill of Rights to the extent required by the nature of the rights and the nature of that juristic person." In Ex Parte Chairperson of the Constitutional Assembly: In re Certification of the Constitution, the Constitutional Court heard that the extension of constitutional rights to juristic persons would diminish the rights of natural persons. Yet it rejected that objection in the following terms:

Many "universally accepted fundamental rights" will be fully recognised only if afforded to juristic persons as well as natural persons. For example, freedom of speech, to be given proper effect, must be afforded to the media, which are often owned or controlled by juristic persons. While it is true that some rights are not appropriate to enjoyment by juristic persons, the text of s 8(4) specifically recognises this. The text also recognises that the nature of a juristic person may be taken into account by a court in determining whether a particular right is available to such person or not. (Note: Ex Parte Chairperson of the Constitutional Assembly: In re Certification of the Constitution of the Republic of South Africa 1996 (4) SA 744 (CC).)

In respect of the first constitutional consideration, the nature of the right, certain rights – such as the right to life and right to bodily integrity – protect personal conditions that only natural persons possess. Conversely, certain rights are self-evidently applicable to juristic persons, such as the right of trade unions to organise. In the case of other rights, the situation is less clear and requires greater interpretation on a case-by-case basis. For example, considering the section 14 right to privacy, the Constitutional Court held in Investigating Directorate: Serious Economic Offences v Hyundai Motors that juristic persons "enjoy the right to privacy, although not to the same extent as natural persons", because, "Privacy is a right which becomes more intense the closer it moves to the intimate personal sphere of the life of human beings". (Note: Investigating Directorate: Serious Economic Offences and Others v Hyundai Motor Distributors (Pty) Ltd and Others In re: Hyundai Motor Distributors (Pty) Ltd and Others v Smit NO and Others 2001 (1) SA 545 (CC).) More recently, considering the section 10 right to dignity, the court held in Reddell v Mineral Sands Resources that juristic persons do not have a constitutional right to dignity, because, on a purposive reading, section 10 intended to protected the "intrinsic self-worth" of human beings. (Note: Reddell and Others v Mineral Sands Resources (Pty) Ltd and Others 2023 (2) SA 404 (CC).)

In respect of the nature of the juristic person who is asserted to bear a constitutional right, existing case law suggests that the objectives or purpose of the juristic person are a decisive factor, partly because they may reveal a relationship between the juristic person and the natural persons who "stand behind" it and use it for the collective exercise of their fundamental rights. In FNB v Commissioner for the South African Revenue Services, which affirmed that private companies have the property rights protected in section 25, the Constitutional Court was aware that, in almost all cases, shares in private companies vest "ultimately" in natural persons, and, "The property rights of natural persons can only be fully and properly realised if such rights are afforded to companies as well as to natural persons". (Note: First National Bank of SA Limited v Commissioner for the South African Revenue Services and Another; First National Bank of SA LImited v Minister of Finance 2002 (4) SA 768 (CC).) Conversely, in SITA v Gijima, the Constitutional Court held that state entities are not beneficiaries of the section 33 right to just administrative action, because rights are necessarily correlative and the state is itself the bearer of the obligation imposed by that right. (Note: SITA v Gijima Holdings (Pty) Ltd 2018 (2) SA 23 (CC).)

==== Waiver ====
Per Iain Currie and Johan de Waal, individuals may waive the right to exercise some constitutional rights: such waiver does not ensure the validity of otherwise unconstitutional conduct, but it consists in the individual's commitment not to invoke the constitutionality invalidity of that conduct. Currie and de Waal suggest the effect of the waiver depends on the nature and purpose of the right in question – in contrast to the negative liberties, the rights to dignity and life may not be waived – but that, in all cases, courts may consider waiver (alongside victim responsibility more generally) in assessing and remedying rights violations.

=== Duty-bearers ===
==== Vertical effect ====
Affirming the value of constitutional supremacy entrenched in section 2 of the Constitution, section 8(1) holds that, "The Bill of Rights applies to all law, and binds the legislature, the executive, the judiciary and all organs of state." As confirmed by the Constitutional Court in Pharmaceutical Manufacturers Association: In re Ex Parte President, this provision, read with enabling provisions elsewhere in the Constitution, is the basis of a wide-ranging system of judicial review in South Africa. Section 7(1) additionally binds the state to respect and fulfil constitutional rights. Thus it is well established in the Constitution that the Bill of Rights has vertical effect, with the rights of private persons creating enforceable obligations on the state.

==== Horizontal effect ====
Section 8 also allows that the Bill of Rights has horizontal effect, insofar as section 8(2) provides that, "A provision of the Bill of Rights binds a natural or a juristic person if, and to the extent that, it is applicable, taking into account the nature of the right and the nature of any duty imposed by the right." Section 8(3) requires that, when a court applies the Bill of Rights in this way, it may develop the common law accordingly. Khumalo v Holomisa and Ramakatsa v Magashule are prominent cases involving the horizontal application of specific constitutional rights to private disputes. In Khumalo, the court found that "direct horizontal application" was necessitated by "the intensity of the constitutional right in question, coupled with the potential invasion of that right which could be occasioned by persons other than the state or organs of state". (Note: Khumalo and Others v Holomisa (CCT53/01) [2002] ZACC 12; 2002 (5) SA 401; 2002 (8) BCLR 771.) In addition to these factors, Currie and de Waal suggest that the purpose of a given provision may be important in determining whether it is applicable to private conduct or not, and certain rights – such as the section 12(1) right to freedom from violence and the section 9(4) right to freedom from unfair discrimination – are explicitly binding on private conduct.

== Enumerated rights ==
=== Equality ===
§9(1)–(2): Everyone is equal before the law and has the right to equal protection and benefit of the law. Equality includes the full and equal enjoyment of all rights and freedoms. To promote the achievement of equality, legislative and other measures designed to protect or advance persons, or categories of persons, disadvantaged by unfair discrimination may be taken.

The first right protected by the Bill of Rights is the right to equality, located in section 9 of the Constitution, which contains strong provisions on legal and social equality and explicit prohibitions against unfair discrimination. At the broadest level, section 9(1) provides for universal equality before the law. Section 9(2) expands on this provision, stipulating that "Equality includes the full and equal enjoyment of all rights and freedoms." However, section 9(2) also provides that, "To promote the achievement of equality, legislative and other measures designed to protect or advance persons, or categories of persons, disadvantaged by unfair discrimination may be taken." Section 9(2) was applied to uphold affirmative action measures in Minister of Finance v Van Heerden and South African Police Service v Barnard.

Subsections 9(3) to 9(5) deal expressly with unfair discrimination. Discriminatory conduct or legislation is treated differently according to the grounds for the discrimination in question, and, in particular, according to whether it constitutes discrimination on the basis of one of the "listed grounds" enumerated explicitly in section 9(3). These so-called listed grounds are race, gender, sex, pregnancy, marital status, ethnic or social origin, colour, sexual orientation, age, disability, religion, conscience, belief, culture, language and birth.

Unfair discrimination on a listed ground is impermissible, regardless of whether it is direct or indirect, and regardless of whether it is carried out by the state (in contravention of section 9(3)) or by a person (in contravention of section 9(4)). Moreover, discrimination on a listed ground is presumed to be unfair: in terms of section 9(5), such discrimination is "unfair unless it is established that the discrimination is fair". On the other hand, in cases of discrimination on the basis of any other, non-listed ground, the constitutional threshold is higher, because only section 9(3) is applicable: under that provision, the state "may not unfairly discriminate directly or indirectly against anyone" on any ground, but, in the case of non-listed grounds, the discrimination must be shown to be unfair.

Section 9(4) additionally provides that national legislation must be enacted "to prevent or prohibit unfair discrimination"; the legislation thus enacted was the Promotion of Equality and Prevention of Unfair Discrimination Act 4 of 2000, better known as the Equality Act, which is enforceable in the Equality Court.

=== Human dignity ===
§10: Everyone has inherent dignity and the right to have their dignity respected and protected.

Section 10 provides that, "Everyone has inherent dignity and the right to have their dignity respected and protected". This right to dignity is one of several places in which dignity features in the South African Constitution and constitutional law, and, though it is often considered alongside other rights, it is rarely on its own dispositive. Thus in Dawood v Minister of Home Affairs, Justice Kate O'Regan wrote for a unanimous Constitutional Court that:

Human dignity... informs constitutional adjudication and interpretation at a range of levels. It is a value that informs the interpretation of many, possibly all, other rights... Section 10, however, makes it plain that dignity is not only a value fundamental to our Constitution, it is a justiciable and enforceable right that must be respected and protected. In many cases, however, where the value of human dignity is offended, the primary constitutional breach occasioned may be of a more specific right such as the right to bodily integrity, the right to equality or the right not to be subjected to slavery, servitude or forced labour. (Note: Dawood and Another v Minister of Home Affairs and Others; Shalabi and Another v Minister of Home Affairs and Others; Thomas and Another v Minister of Home Affairs and Others (CCT35/99) [2000] ZACC 8; 2000 (3) SA 936; 2000 (8) BCLR 837 (CC).)

Nonetheless, Dawood itself is emblematic of a major category of exceptions to this general rule, in which dignity itself has operated as a dispositive, first-order rule; these exceptions largely relate to intimate associations such as marriage, the Dawood court having held that the right to family life is implicitly protected by section 10 insofar as family relationships are of "defining significance" for many individuals.

=== Life ===
§11: Everyone has the right to life.

Section 11 protects a universal right to life. It is most prominently associated with the abolition of capital punishment in South Africa, which was the result of the Constitutional Court's ruling in S v Makwanyane. Though Makwanyane was decided under the Interim Constitution, the Constitutional Court later upheld the ruling under the 1996 Constitution, including in Mohamed v President. Section 11 is also implicated in the use of lethal force in arrest or in self-defence, as considered by the Constitutional Court in Ex Parte Minister of Safety and Security: In re S v Walters.

As suggested by the Makwanyane ratio, the right to life is universal and is not forfeited by wrongful or criminal conduct. However, in Christian Lawyers Association v Minister of Health, the Transvaal High Court established that foetuses do not have a right to life in terms of section 11.

=== Personal freedom and security ===
§12: Everyone has the right to freedom and security of the person, which includes the right— not to be deprived of freedom arbitrarily or without just cause; not to be detained without trial; to be free from all forms of violence from either public or private sources; not to be tortured in any way; and not to be treated or punished in a cruel, inhuman or degrading way. Everyone has the right to bodily and psychological integrity, which includes the right— to make decisions concerning reproduction; to security in and control over their body; and not to be subjected to medical or scientific experiments without their informed consent.
§13: No one may be subjected to slavery, servitude or forced labour.

Section 12 protects two sets of universal personal liberties. First, under section 12(1), it protects the right to "freedom and security of the person", including the right "not to be deprived of freedom arbitrarily or without just cause" and the right to protected from detention without trial; from torture; from cruel, inhuman or degrading treatment; and from "all forms of violence from either public or private sources". Stuart Woolman views section 12(1) as providing "both substantive protection and procedural protection for any deprivation of physical liberty". Second, section 12(2) enshrines the right to bodily integrity and psychological integrity, including an individual's right "to make decisions concerning reproduction", "to security in and control over their body", and "not to be subjected to medical or scientific experiments without their informed consent". Related to this family of section 12 rights is the section 13 protection against being subjected to slavery, servitude, or forced labour.

Many of these rights played an important role in the Constitutional Court's early jurisprudence, particularly insofar as they were "refracted through the prism of dignity" by the court. Section 12 ultimately had particular import for state liability under the South African law of delict and for the state's treatment of detained and convicted persons. Relevant Constitutional Court judgments in this connection include De Lange v Smuts, S v Dodo, Zealand v Minister of Justice, and Mohamed v President.

More directly, the protections for reproductive freedom, located in section 12(2)(a), secure the legal status of abortion in South Africa. In Christian Lawyers Association v Minister of Health II, Transvaal High Court Judge Phineas Mojapelo upheld the Choice on Termination of Pregnancy Act 92 of 1996 on the basis that section 12(2) protected a right to abortion; legislation enshrining this right was therefore not only constitutionally permitted but, "in a sense", constitutionally required. (Note: Christian Lawyers Association v National Minister of Health and Another 2005 (1) SA 509 (T), 518, 2004 (10) BCLR 1086 (T).) It also likely that, in a similar fashion, section 12(2)(a) entails a right of access to contraception.

=== Privacy ===
§14: Everyone has the right to privacy, which includes the right not to have— their person or home searched; their property searched; their possessions seized; or the privacy of their communications infringed.

Section 14 protects a universal right to privacy. In addition to the general right to privacy, the provisions protects four specific aspects of privacy, relating respectively to search and seizure and private communications: it prohibits searches of an individual's home, person, or property; the seizure of their possessions; or infringements upon "the privacy of their communications".

The Constitutional Court, considering the content of the right to privacy for the first time, held in Bernstein v Bester that the scope of the privacy right extends only to contexts in which an individual has a legitimate expectation of privacy (akin to the American test). (Note: Bernstein and Others v Bester NO and Others (CCT23/95) [1996] ZACC 2; 1996 (4) BCLR 449; 1996 (2) SA 751 (CC).) Moreover, per Justice Laurie Ackermann, the court had that the right has more force in more personal contexts:

it is only the inner sanctum of a person, such as his/her family life, sexual preference and home environment, which is shielded from erosion by conflicting rights of the community... Privacy is acknowledged in the truly personal realm, but as a person moves into communal relations and activities such as business and social interaction, the scope of personal space shrinks accordingly.

Other important cases concerning the right to privacy include Mistry v Interim National Medical and Dental Council of South Africa, Investigating Directorate: Serious Economic Offences v Hyundai Motor Distributors, Case v Minister of Safety and Security, De Reuck v Director of Public Prosecutions, and Minister of Justice and Constitutional Development v Prince, all judgments in criminal law or criminal procedure.

=== Freedom of religion and thought ===
§15(1): Everyone has the right to freedom of conscience, religion, thought, belief and opinion.

Section 15(1) provides for the universal right to freedom of conscience; freedom of religion; and freedom of thought, belief, and opinion. The right to freedom of religion has generated the largest body of case law, including such cases as Christian Education South Africa v Minister of Educationand Minister of Home Affairs v Fourie. In Christian Education, as well as in the earlier matter of S v Lawrence; S v Negal; S v Solberg, the Constitutional Court adopted the Supreme Court of Canada's definition of freedom of religion, as articulated in R v Big M Drug Mart. Under this definition, freedom of religion "includes both the right to have a belief and the right to express such belief in practice". (Note: Christian Education South Africa v Minister of Education (CCT4/00) [2000] ZACC 11; 2000 (4) SA 757; 2000 (10) BCLR 1051.) In addition, the right to practise one's religion and form religious associations is explicitly protected elsewhere in the Bill of Rights.

Sections 15(2) and 15(3) clarify the scope and implication of the freedoms protected in section 15(1). Section 15(2) provides that, "Religious observances may be conducted at state or state-aided institutions, provided that— those observances follow rules made by the appropriate public authorities; they are conducted on an equitable basis; and attendance at them is free and voluntary." Constitutional negotiators apparently included this provision in an overt effort to preclude a debate about prayer in public schools. Meanwhile, section 15(3) concerns South African family law and the possible codification of customary law in this area: it provides that legislation may be enacted to recognise "marriages concluded under any tradition, or a system of religious, personal or family law; or systems of personal and family law under any tradition, or adhered to by persons professing a particular religion", provided that such recognition is consistent with the Constitution.

=== Freedom of expression ===
§16(1): Everyone has the right to freedom of expression, which includes— freedom of the press and other media; freedom to receive or impart information or ideas; freedom of artistic creativity; and academic freedom and freedom of scientific research.

Section 16(1) protects a universal right to freedom of expression, including explicit protections for freedom of the press, "freedom of artistic creativity", and academic freedom. However, the scope of freedom of expression is expressly limited by section 16(2), which provides that the right to freedom of expression "does not extend" to propaganda for war, incitement of imminent violence, or "advocacy of hatred that is based on race, ethnicity, gender or religion, and that constitutes incitement to cause harm".

In Islamic Unity Convention v Independent Broadcasting Authority, the Constitutional Court confirmed that the categories of expression enumerated in section 16(2) fall outside of the ambit of constitutionally protected speech; however, it also held that section 16(1) protects any expression that is not specifically excluded under section 16(2), and any regulation of such expression limits the section 16(1) right. (Note: Islamic Unity Convention v Independent Broadcasting Authority and Others (CCT36/01) [2002] ZACC 3; 2002 (4) SA 294; 2002 (5) BCLR 433 (CC).) Thus, in line with Islamic Unity Convention, South African courts have interpreted freedom of expression broadly. Notably, the Constitutional Court held in De Reuck v Director of Public Prosecutions that child pornography is a form of protected expression, though it is "of little value", "does not implicate the core values of the right", and "is found on the periphery of the right". (Note: De Reuck v Director of Public Prosecutions (Witwatersrand Local Division) and Others (CCT5/03) [2003] ZACC 19; 2004 (1) SA 406 (CC); 2003 (12) BCLR 1333 (CC).) The Supreme Court of Appeal has held that commercial speech also constitutes protected expression.

The Equality Act of 2000 contains statutory prohibitions on hate speech which are broader than the limitations implied by section 16(2). In Qwelane v South African Human Rights Commission, the Constitutional Court considered whether those statutory prohibitions are consistent with the section 16 right to freedom of expression.

=== Assembly and protest ===
§17: Everyone has the right, peacefully and unarmed, to assemble, to demonstrate, to picket and to present petitions.

Section 17 provides for a universal right to assemble, to demonstrate, to picket, and to present petitions, provided in each case that the right is exercised "peacefully and unarmed". The Constitutional Court has frequently held obiter that these section 17 rights aim to promote freedom of expression in a democratic society. It has also considered the content of section 17 rights directly in cases including South African Transport and Allied Workers Union v Garvas, Pilane v Pilane, and Mlungwana v S.

=== Freedom of association ===
§18: Everyone has the right to freedom of association.

Section 18 protects the universal right to freedom of association. Like the section 17 rights, these rights have frequently been linked to freedom of expression. Writing for the Constitutional Court in Pilane, Justice Thembile Skweyiya commented:

It strikes me that the exercise of the right to freedom of expression can be enhanced by group association. Similarly, associative rights can be heightened by the freer transmissibility of a group's identity and purpose, expressed through its name, emblems and labels. These rights are interconnected and complementary. Political participation, actuated by the lawful exercise of these rights, can and should assist in ensuring accountability in all forms of leadership and in encouraging good governance. (Note: Pilane and Another v Pilane and Another (CCT 46/12) [2013] ZACC 3; 2013 (4) BCLR 431 (CC).)

The Constitutional Court discussed freedom of association at length in New Nation Movement v President, in which Justice Mbuyiseli Madlanga held that the right to freedom of association implies not only a positive right to be free to form an association but also a negative right, protecting "the freedom not to associate at all, if that be the individual's choice". On this basis, the Constitutional Court held that section 17, read with the section 19(3)(b) right to stand for office, created a right to stand for office as an independent candidate rather than as a member of a political party.

=== Citizens' rights ===
==== Political rights ====
§19: Every citizen is free to make political choices, which includes the right— to form a political party; to participate in the activities of, or recruit members for, a political party; and to campaign for a political party or cause. Every citizen has the right to free, fair and regular elections for any legislative body established in terms of the Constitution. Every adult citizen has the right— to vote in elections for any legislative body established in terms of the Constitution, and to do so in secret; and to stand for public office and, if elected, to hold office.
§20: No citizen may be deprived of citizenship.

Section 19 grants a detailed set of political rights to South African citizens. Section 19(1) protects citizens' freedom "to make political choices", including the right to form a political party, to participate in the activities of a political party, and to campaign for a political party or cause. Section 19(2) protects the right of citizens to free, fair and regular elections to all legislative bodies. Finally, section 19(3) protects the right of adult citizens to vote in secret in elections for any legislative body, as well as the right to stand for public office and, if elected, to hold office.

These sections are closely related to South Africa's history of racial suffrage and widespread disenfranchisement; they are therefore also closely related to section 20, which provides that, "No citizen may be deprived of citizenship". In Ramakatsa v Magashule, the Constitutional Court said of section 19 that:

The scope and content of the rights entrenched by this section may be ascertained by means of an interpretation process which must be informed by context that is both historical and constitutional. During the apartheid order, the majority of people in our country were denied political rights which were enjoyed by a minority... Many organisations whose objectives were to advance the rights and interests of black people were banned. These organisations included the present ANC. Participation in the activities of these organisations constituted a serious criminal offence that carried a heavy penalty. The purpose of section 19 is to prevent this wholesale denial of political rights to citizens of the country from ever happening again. (Note: Ramakatsa and Others v Magashule and Others (CCT 109/12) [2012] ZACC 31; 2013 (2) BCLR 202 (CC).)

The Constitutional Court has a large body of case law on the interpretation of the political rights, including a large number in electoral law. In addition to New Nation Movement and Ramakatsa, important cases include UDM v President, New National Party v Government, August v Electoral Commission, and Minister of Home Affairs v NICRO.

==== Civil rights ====
§21(3)–(4): Every citizen has the right to enter, to remain in and to reside anywhere in, the Republic. Every citizen has the right to a passport.

Under the heading of "Freedom of Movement and Residence", section 21(3) provides that citizens have "the right to enter, to remain in and to reside anywhere in, the Republic", and section 21(4) provides for citizens' right to a passport. These protections are closely connected to the former pass laws and Group Areas Act, both detested apartheid policies; the latter was a new addition to the 1996 Constitution, having no analogue in the Interim Constitution. The most direct use of section 21 rights in constitutional litigation was in Geuking v President, wherein it was contended that section 21(3)'s right to "remain in" South Africa must be considered when the state assents to the extradition of a citizen under the Extradition Act 67, 1962; however, the court rejected that contention. (Note: Geuking v President of the Republic of South Africa and Others (CCT35/02) [2002] ZACC 29; 2003 (3) SA 34 (CC); 2004 (9) BCLR 895 (CC).)

§22: Every citizen has the right to choose their trade, occupation or profession freely. The practice of a trade, occupation or profession may be regulated by law.

Section 22 enshrines citizens' right to freedom of trade, freedom of occupation, and freedom of profession. It also provides that the practice of a trade, occupation, or profession may be regulated by law. Section 22 rights have most often been litigated in cases involving agreements in restraint of trade. In that context, in Reddy v Siemens, Acting Judge of Appeal Frans Malan suggested, on behalf of a unanimous Supreme Court of Appeal, that freedom of contract is "an integral part" of the section 22 right. (Note: Reddy v Siemens Telecommunications (Pty) Ltd (251/06) [2006] ZASCA 135; 2007 (2) SA 486 (SCA); (2007) 28 ILJ 317 (SCA).) Likewise, Chief Justice Pius Langa wrote in Phumelela Gaming and Leisure v Gründlingh that:

The Bill of Rights does not expressly promote competition principles, but the right to freedom of trade, enshrined in section 22 of the Constitution is, in my view, consistent with a competitive regime in matters of trade and the recognition of the protection of competition as being in the public welfare. (Note: Phumelela Gaming and Leisure Limited v Gründlingh and Others (CCT31/05) [2006] ZACC 6; 2006 (8) BCLR 883 (CC); 2007 (6) SA 350 (CC).)

Section 22's predecessor in the Interim Constitution was not restricted in application to South African citizens and therefore could plausibly accommodate non-citizens and even juristic persons in the protections it offers. During the constitutional certification process, the Constitutional Court considered a challenge to this narrowing of scope but rejected it on the basis that section 22 remained consistent with international human rights instruments. (Note: Ex parte Chairperson of the Constitutional Assembly: In re Certification of the Amended Text of the Constitution of the Republic of South Africa, 1996 1997 (2) SA 97 (CC), 1997 (1) BCLR 1 (CC).)

=== Freedom of movement ===
§21(1)–(2): Everyone has the right to freedom of movement. Everyone has the right to leave the Republic.

While sections 21(3) and 21(4) are limited to South African citizens, sections 21(1) and 21(2) are not. They provide, respectively, for a universal right to freedom of movement and for a universal "right to leave the Republic". In Affordable Medicines Trust v Minister of Health, the Constitutional Court considered the application of the right to freedom of movement to a licensing scheme under which pharmaceutical licenses could only be exercised at particular premises; in that case, it held that "the right to decide where one will practise one's profession" is subject to regulation under section 22 of the Constitution, since it is a right relating to the practice of a profession. (Note: Affordable Medicines Trust and Others v Minister of Health and Another (CCT27/04) [2005] ZACC 3; 2006 (3) SA 247 (CC); 2005 (6) BCLR 529 (CC).)

=== Labour relations ===
§23(1)–(3): Everyone has the right to fair labour practices. Every worker has the right— to form and join a trade union; to participate in the activities and programmes of a trade union; and to strike. Every employer has the right— to form and join an employers’ organisation; and to participate in the activities and programmes of an employers' organisation.

Section 23 sets out several labour rights, both individual and associational in nature and applying to employers as well as to employees. Sections 23(1) and 23(2) concern universal workers' rights. Section 23(1) provides for a right to "fair labour practices", while section 23(2) provides for the right to strike and the right to form, join, and participate in the activities of a trade union. Similarly, under section 23(3), every employer has the right to form, join, and participate in the activities of an employers' organisation. Section 23(4) provides that every trade union and employers' organisation has the right "to determine its own administration, programmes and activities; to organise; and to form and join a federation", while section 23(5) provides that every trade union, employers' organisation, and employer has the right to engage in collective bargaining. The Constitutional Court has interpreted these rights in cases including SANDU v Minister of Defence I, SANDU v Minister of Defence II, NEHAWU v University of Cape Town, and NUMSA v Bader Bop.

Section 23 concludes with the provisos, in section 23(5) and section 23(6) respectively, that national legislation may be enacted to regulate collective bargaining and to recognise union security arrangements contained in collective agreements. Accordingly, in an early statement of its principle of subsidiarity, the Constitutional Court held in SANDU II that litigants seeking to enforce their section 23(5) right to collective bargaining should base their claims on any legislation (including subordinate legislation) enacted to regulate the exercise of that right, rather than relying directly on the text of section 23(5).

=== Environment ===
§24: Everyone has the right— to an environment that is not harmful to their health or wellbeing; and to have the environment protected, for the benefit of present and future generations, through reasonable legislative and other measures that— prevent pollution and ecological degradation; promote conservation; and secure ecologically sustainable development and use of natural resources while promoting justifiable economic and social development.

Section 24 sets out two universal environmental rights. The first, provided in section 24(a), is the right of individuals "to an environment that is not harmful to their health or wellbeing". The second, provided in section 24(b), is the right "to have the environment protected, for the benefit of present and future generations, through reasonable legislative and other measures"; such measures must "prevent pollution and ecological degradation; promote conservation; and secure ecologically sustainable development and use of natural resources while promoting justifiable economic and social development."

In Eskom v Vaal River Development Association, the Constitutional Court held that electricity supply restrictions, effected by Eskom in Lekwa Local Municipality and Ngwathe Local Municipality, impinged upon residents' section 24(a) right, because the restrictions had an adverse effect on the treatment of sewage and therefore on the quality of the water supply. Justice Madlanga commented, "If the flow of raw faeces into the Vaal River is not violative of the right to an environment that is not harmful to health or well-being, I do not know what is." (Note: Eskom Holdings SOC Ltd v Vaal River Development Association (Pty) Ltd and Others (CCT 44/22) [2022] ZACC 44; 2023 (5) BCLR 527 (CC); 2023 (4) SA 325 (CC).)

=== Property ===
Section 25, the so-called property clause, explicates constitutional property rights. In comparative international terms, it is unusually detailed, and property rights were hotly contested during constitutional negotiations, partly because of the symbolic importance of land reform in the post-apartheid context. In June and September 1993, for example, there were marches in Kempton Park and Pretoria by communities demanding constitutional recognition of their right to return to land from which they had been dispossessed; at the same time, other communities were determined that section 25 should entrench and protect rights to private property.

§25(1)–(2): No one may be deprived of property except in terms of law of general application, and no law may permit arbitrary deprivation of property. Property may be expropriated only in terms of law of general application— for a public purpose or in the public interest; and subject to compensation, the amount of which and the time and manner of payment of which have either been agreed to by those affected or decided or approved by a court.

The heart of constitutional property rights is subsections 25(1) and 25(2), which protect persons against deprivation of property and expropriation of property respectively. According to these provisions, deprivation or expropriation of property is permissible only when it proceeds "in terms of law of general application". Further, section 25(1) adds that deprivation of property may not be arbitrary, and section 25(2) adds that expropriation of property must be "for a public purpose or in the public interest" and "subject to compensation, the amount of which and the time and manner of payment of which have either been agreed to by those affected or decided or approved by a court". In FNB v Commissioner for the South African Revenue Services, an early case on the interpretation of the property clause, the Constitutional Court held that the overriding purpose of these provisions is to "strike a proportionate balance" between the protection of property rights and the public interest. In the same case, the court declined to define property comprehensively, but held that section 25 certainly applied to ownership of corporeal movables and land. (Note: First National Bank of SA Limited t/a Wesbank v Commissioner for the South African Revenue Services and Another; First National Bank of SA Limited t/a Wesbank v Minister of Finance (CCT19/01) [2002] ZACC 5; 2002 (4) SA 768; 2002 (7) BCLR 702 (CC).)

§25(3): The amount of the compensation [for expropriated property] and the time and manner of payment must be just and equitable, reflecting an equitable balance between the public interest and the interests of those affected, having regard to all relevant circumstances, including— the current use of the property; the history of the acquisition and use of the property; the market value of the property; the extent of direct state investment and subsidy in the acquisition and beneficial capital improvement of the property; and the purpose of the expropriation.

Section 25(3) provides further guidance on the circumstances in which expropriation is permissible. It requires that, "The amount of the compensation and the time and manner of payment must be just and equitable, reflecting an equitable balance between the public interest and the interests of those affected, having regard to all relevant circumstances". Subsections 25(3)(a)–(e) provide a non-exhaustive list of five factors which are deemed to be "relevant circumstances". The interpretation of section 25(3)'s requirement of "just and equitable compensation" has been highly controversial. In particular, in the context of policy proposals to expropriate land without compensation, there has been significant debate about whether section 25(3) licenses expropriation where the quantum of compensation is set at zero. In 2021, Parliament considered and rejected the Constitution Eighteenth Amendment Bill, which would amend section 25 and explicitly license expropriation for nil compensation.

Remaining provisions of section 25 concern the application of property rights to the state's pursuit of land reform, thus providing a constitutional framework for land reform. The broad basis for this framework is section 25(8), which provides that, "No provision of this section may impede the state from taking legislative and other measures to achieve land, water and related reform, in order to redress the results of past racial discrimination". Moreover, section 25(4) provides that "the nation's commitment to land reform, and to reforms to bring about equitable access to all South Africa's natural resources" is an element of the "public interest" as deployed in sections 25(2) and 25(3).

The other, more specific provisions on land reform have been understood as granting land-related socioeconomic rights. Subsection 25(5) concerns land redistribution: it obligates the state to "take reasonable legislative and other measures, within its available resources, to foster conditions which enable citizens to gain access to land on an equitable basis". Subsection 25(6) concerns land tenure reform: it provides that, "A person or community whose tenure of land is legally insecure as a result of past racially discriminatory laws or practices is entitled, to the extent provided by an Act of Parliament, either to tenure which is legally secure or to comparable redress." Section 25(9), moreover, obligates Parliament to enact such legislation. Finally, subsection 25(7) provides for land restitution: "A person or community dispossessed of property after 19 June 1913 as a result of past racially discriminatory laws or practices is entitled, to the extent provided by an Act of Parliament, either to restitution of that property or to equitable redress", 19 June 1913 being the date on which the Black Land Act 27 of 1913 was promulgated.

=== Housing ===
§26: Everyone has the right to have access to adequate housing. The state must take reasonable legislative and other measures, within its available resources, to achieve the progressive realisation of this right. No one may be evicted from their home, or have their home demolished, without an order of court made after considering all the relevant circumstances. No legislation may permit arbitrary evictions.

Section 26 grants two universal housing rights: "the right to have access to adequate housing", and the right to protection from arbitrary eviction. The right of access to housing, set out in section 26(1), is complemented, in section 26(2), by a positive responsibility on the state to take reasonable measures to achieve that right's "progressive realisation". This pair of provisions was interpreted by the Constitutional Court in the landmark case of Government v Grootboom, which held that the right to housing is justiciable and enforceable.

Section 26(3), on the right to due process in evictions, provides in part that, "No one may be evicted from their home, or have their home demolished, without an order of court made after considering all the relevant circumstances." In Jaftha v Schoeman, the Constitutional Court found that this right seeks to correct the apartheid history of forced removals by protecting security of tenure. The rights of persons facing eviction are protected most directly by the Extension of Security of Tenure Act 62 of 1997 and the Prevention of Illegal Eviction from and Unlawful Occupation of Land Act 19 of 1998. However, the Constitutional Court has applied the Constitution to evictions in cases including Port Elizabeth Municipality v Various Occupiers, President v Modderklip Boerdery, Residents of Joe Slovo Community v Thubelisha Homes, and Occupiers of 51 Olivia Road, Berea Township and 197 Main Street Johannesburg vs City of Johannesburg; many of these cases involve evictions from unlawfully occupied land.

Per Jaftha v Schoeman, housing rights have significant implications for South African civil procedure, particularly as concerns the award of writs of execution against debtors' homes. Cases dealing with the consequences of Jaftha include Menqa v Markom, Standard Bank v Saunderson, and Gundwana v Steko Development.

=== Basic services and social security ===
§27: Everyone has the right to have access to— health care services, including reproductive health care; sufficient food and water; and social security, including, if they are unable to support themselves and their dependants, appropriate social assistance. The state must take reasonable legislative and other measures, within its available resources, to achieve the progressive realisation of each of these rights. No one may be refused emergency medical treatment.

Section 27(1) enshrines three further universal socioeconomic rights, which David Bilchitz suggests are considered together because they are interdependent: each is valueless without the other. As in the case of the right to housing, the state is given a positive responsibility to take reasonable measures to achieve the "progressive realisation" of each right, set out in section 27(2).

The first section 27(1) right is the right of access to health care services, including access to reproductive health care; in addition, section 27(3) provides explicitly that, "No one may be refused emergency medical treatment." Important cases litigating this right include Soobramoney v Minister of Health, KwaZulu-Natal and Minister of Health v Treatment Action Campaign No. 2. Soobramoney also established that the section 27(3) right to emergency medical treatment is to be interpreted narrowly, as covering acute medical conditions arising from sudden or unexpected events; in particular, it does not include ongoing treatment for chronic illnesses, even if such illness is life-threatening.

The second right in section 27(1) is the right of access to sufficient food and water. The right of access to food is seldom litigated, though it is sometimes a consideration in cases where individuals are evicted from land which they used as a resource to produce food. The right of access to water was considered by the Constitutional Court for the first time in Mazibuko v City of Johannesburg. Access to water and sanitation has also been considered as an element of the access to adequate housing that is protected in section 26(1), as in Residents of Joe Slovo Community.

Finally, section 27(1) provides for the right of access to social security, including a right to "appropriate social assistance" for individuals who are "unable to support themselves and their dependants". The landmark case on the interpretation of this right is Khosa v Minister of Social Development, on the exclusion of non-citizens from government social welfare programmes in South Africa. The right to social assistance was also closely implicated in Black Sash Trust v Minister of Social Development, on the Department of Social Development's failure to secure the orderly administration of social grants during the grants crisis of 2017.

=== Children's rights ===
§28(2): A child's best interests are of paramount importance in every matter concerning the child.

Section 28 provides for a number of rights held by children, with section 28(3) defining children as persons under the age of the 18 years. Perhaps most importantly, section 28(2) provides for the paramountcy of the best interests of the child, a principle imported from the United Nations Convention on the Rights of the Child and developed extensively in South African jurisprudence. In addition, section 28(1) lists nine rights that are held uniquely by children.

In respect of domestic and family life, children have the right "to a name and a nationality from birth; to family care or parental care, or to appropriate alternative care when removed from the family environment; to basic nutrition, shelter, basic health care services and social services; [and] to be protected from maltreatment, neglect, abuse or degradation". Two further rights concern child labour: children have the right "to be protected from exploitative labour practices" and "not to be required or permitted to perform work or provide services that— are inappropriate for a person of that child’s age; or place at risk the child’s well-being, education, physical or mental health or spiritual, moral or social development".

In criminal procedure, children have the right "not to be detained except as a measure of last resort". A child who is detained "may be detained only for the shortest appropriate period of time, and has the right to be kept separately from detained persons over the age of 18 years; and treated in a manner, and kept in conditions, that take account of the child's age". In civil procedure, children have the right "to have a legal practitioner assigned to the child by the state, and at state expense, in civil proceedings affecting the child, if substantial injustice would otherwise result". Finally, children have the right "not to be used directly in armed conflict, and to be protected in times of armed conflict".

=== Education ===
Section 29 enshrines the universal right to education and defines the positive responsibilities of the state in this respect. It has been described as a "hybrid right": while section 29(1) protects a socioeconomic right, sections 29(2) and 29(3) concern civil rights. Section 29 is generally viewed as emanating closely from the apartheid context in which the Bill of Rights was negotiated: the right to education had a "restitutional" dimension, given the effects of the Bantu Education system, but also a protective dimension for those who treasured Afrikaans as a medium of instruction or were otherwise reluctant to submit to state control of education.

§29(1): Everyone has the right— to a basic education, including adult basic education; and to further education, which the state, through reasonable measures, must make progressively available and accessible.

Under section 29(1)(a), there is a universal right to basic education, including adult basic education, and a universal right to further education is provided in section 29(1)(b). In the case of further education, as in the case of housing and basic services, the state's obligation is to take "reasonable measures" to make the resource "progressively available and accessible". The right to basic education is not qualified in that manner; in Governing Body of the Juma Musjid Primary School v Essay, the Constitutional Court confirmed that it is "immediately realisable", unlike some of the other socioeconomic rights. (Note: Governing Body of the Juma Musjid Primary School & Others v Essay N.O. and Others (CCT 29/10) [2011] ZACC 13; 2011 (8) BCLR 761 (CC).)

Yet the wording of section 29(1)(a) does not entail that basic education must be free of charge, and, in that respect, it is less strong than the Universal Declaration of Human Rights, which provides for free basic education. However, courts have interpreted the section 29(1)(a) right to basic education to extend to access to the equipment that is necessary for such education: in Minister of Basic Education v Basic Education for All, the Supreme Court of Appeal confirmed that section 29(1)(a) entitled all learners at public schools "to be provided with every textbook prescribed for his or her grade before commencement of the teaching of the course for which the textbook is prescribed". (Note: Minister of Basic Education v Basic Education for All (20793/2014) [2015] ZASCA 198; [2016] 1 All SA 369 (SCA); 2016 (4) SA 63 (SCA).)

Section 29(2) provides further that, "Everyone has the right to receive education in the official language or languages of their choice in public educational institutions where that education is reasonably practicable." In order to effect this right, the state is required to "consider all reasonable educational alternatives, including single medium institutions, taking into account— equity; practicability; and the need to redress the results of past racially discriminatory laws and practices." Given South Africa's linguistic diversity and the sensitivity of language policy, this provision has often been litigated; related cases decided by the Constitutional Court include Mpumalanga Department of Education v Hoërskool Ermelo. (Note: Head of Department: Mpumalanga Department of Education and Another v Hoërskool Ermelo and Another (CCT40/09) [2009] ZACC 32; 2010 (2) SA 415 (CC); 2010 (3) BCLR 177 (CC).)

Finally, section 29(3) provides for a universal right of individuals "to establish and maintain, at their own expense, independent educational institutions that— do not discriminate on the basis of race; are registered with the state; and maintain standards that are not inferior to standards at comparable public educational institutions." Under section 29(4), this provision "does not preclude state subsidies for independent educational institutions". The Constitutional Court considered the application of section 29(3) in AB v Pridwin Preparatory School. (Note: AB and Another v Pridwin Preparatory School and Others (CCT294/18) [2020] ZACC 12; 2020 (9) BCLR 1029 (CC); 2020 (5) SA 327 (CC).)

=== Culture, language, and communities ===
§30(1): Everyone has the right to use the language and to participate in the cultural life of their choice.

Sections 30 and 31 consider further cultural rights, religious rights, and linguistic rights. Section 30(1) provides that, "Everyone has the right to use the language and to participate in the cultural life of their choice". This freedom applies both in the private sphere and in the public sphere, since its application is not limited to any specific context; the Constitutional Court found in the Certification judgment that the right to use the language of one's choice "would extend to communications with the government, subject to reasonable limitations where they would be warranted." (Note: Certification of the Constitution of the Republic of South Africa, 1996 (CCT 23/96) [1996] ZACC 26; 1996 (4) SA 744 (CC).)

§31(1): Persons belonging to a cultural, religious or linguistic community may not be denied the right, with other members of that community— to enjoy their culture, practise their religion and use their language; and to form, join and maintain cultural, religious and linguistic associations and other organs of civil society.

Section 31 applies to "persons belonging to a cultural, religious or linguistic community", whom it provides "may not be denied the right... to enjoy their culture, practise their religion and use their language; and to form, join and maintain cultural, religious and linguistic associations and other organs of civil society." The provision extends to an individual community member's freedom to exercise these freedoms "with other members of that community", leaving it somewhat ambiguous whether the section 31 rights are group rights or individual rights. They are generally referred to as "associational rights", and Justice Sandile Ngcobo wrote for the minority in Prince v President of the Law Society that section 31 "emphasises and protects the associational nature of cultural, religious and language rights", which are protected at the individual level in section 30(1) and, in the case of religion, section 15(1). (Note: Prince v President of the Law Society of the Cape of Good Hope (CCT36/00) [2002] ZACC 1; 2002 (2) SA 794; 2002 (3) BCLR 231 (CC).)

In Christian Education, Justice Albie Sachs pointed out, for a unanimous court, that section 31 "closely parallels" article 27 of the International Covenant on Civil and Political Rights, except that it refers to "communities" rather than "minorities": thus, "the interest protected by section 31 is not a statistical one dependent on a counter-balancing of numbers, but a qualitative one based on respect for diversity".

Both section 30 and section 31 conclude with internal limitations in section 30(2) and 31(2) respectively; in each case, the limitation is the proviso that the rights referred to may not be exercised "in a manner inconsistent with any provision of the Bill of Rights". In respect of section 31(2), Sachs found in Christian Education that the limitation sought "expressly to acknowledge the supremacy of the Constitution", preventing associational rights from "being used to 'privatise' constitutionally offensive group practices" or to shield "oppressive features of internal relationships primarily within the communities concerned". Viewed in this light, these internal limitations take a clear stance on the so-called paradox of tolerance.

=== Access to information ===
§32(1): Everyone has the right of access to— any information held by the state; and any information that is held by another person and that is required for the exercise or protection of any rights.

Section 32 provides for a universal right of access to information of two kinds: "any information held by the state", under section 32(1)(a), and "any information that is held by another person and that is required for the exercise or protection of any rights", under section 31(b). It is among the most advanced such provision in any constitution worldwide.

In the Certification judgment, the Constitutional Court held that section 32 envisaged access to state information as a means to "a wider purpose, namely, to ensure that there is open and accountable administration at all levels of government"; in subsequent jurisprudence in lower courts, it was similarly linked to the founding constitutional values of "accountability, responsiveness and openness". The Constitutional Court affirmed this connection in My Vote Counts v Minister of Justice, in which it also held that access to certain kinds of information – in this case, information about political parties' sources of funding – was essential for the effective exercise of the political rights protected in section 19.

Section 32(2) of the Constitution requires the enactment of national freedom of information legislation to give effect to the right of access to information, with due provision "for reasonable measures to alleviate the administrative and financial burden on the state". The legislation thus enacted was the Promotion of Access to Information Act 2 of 2000 (PAIA). The Constitutional Court held in My Vote Counts v Speaker that, under the principle of subsidiarity, section 32 rights are henceforth justiciable as claims under, or challenges to, PAIA.

=== Just administrative action ===
§33(1)–(2): Everyone has the right to administrative action that is lawful, reasonable and procedurally fair. Everyone whose rights have been adversely affected by administrative action has the right to be given written reasons.

Under the heading of "Just Administrative Act", section 33 provides for administrative due process. Section 33(1) provides for a universal right "to administrative action that is lawful, reasonable and procedurally fair", while section 33(2) requires that, "Everyone whose rights have been adversely affected by administrative action has the right to be given written reasons." The tripartite requirements of section 33(1) were familiar in South African administrative law as common-law principles, but were given new constitutional grounding by the Bill of Rights. In an early trilogy of cases – Fedsure Life Assurance v Johannesburg, President of the Republic of South Africa v South African Rugby Football Union, and Nel v Le Roux – the Constitutional Court incrementally defined the scope of "administrative action", holding that it excludes legislative action, executive action, and judicial action.

Section 33(3) mandates the enactment of national legislation to give effect to the section 33 rights, adding that such legislation must, "provide for the review of administrative action by a court or, where appropriate, an independent and impartial tribunal; impose a duty on the state to give effect to the rights in subsections (1) and (2); and promote an efficient administration." The legislation thus enacted was the Promotion of Administrative Justice Act 3 of 2000.

=== Access to courts ===
§34: Everyone has the right to have any dispute that can be resolved by the application of law decided in a fair public hearing before a court or, where appropriate, another independent and impartial tribunal or forum.

Under the heading of "Access to Courts", section 34 enshrines a universal right to a fair hearing of legal disputes. It provides that, "Everyone has the right to have any dispute that can be resolved by the application of law decided in a fair public hearing before a court or, where appropriate, another independent and impartial tribunal or forum". With section 32 and section 33, section 34 has been viewed as providing a category of "leverage right", a primarily procedural guarantee that allows litigants to leverage or vindicate their other (substantive) rights.

In historical context, section 34 responds to the apartheid-era paralysis of judicial review under ouster clauses and parliamentary sovereignty, as well as to the racially bifurcated judicial system created by the Black Administration Act 38 of 1927. Moreover, in Chief Lesapo v North West Agricultural Bank, Justice Yvonne Mokgoro commented that the section 34 right is closely related to the constitutional value of the rule of law and is, in particular, "a bulwark against vigilantism, and the chaos and anarchy which it causes". (Note: Lesapo v North West Agricultural Bank and Another (CCT23/99) [1999] ZACC 16; 2000 (1) SA 409; 1999 (12) BCLR 1420.)

The court held in S v Pennington that section 34 does not apply to criminal proceedings, which are instead regulated by section 35. (Note: S v Pennington and Another (CCT14/97) [1997] ZACC 10; 1997 (10) BCLR 1413; 1997 (4) SA 1076 (CC).) Other cases involving the interpretation and application of section 34 include Barkhuizen v Napier, Beinash v Ernst & Young, Metcash Trading v Commissioner for the South African Revenue Service, Armbruster v Minister of Finance, and Mphahlele v First National Bank. In addition, in President v Modderklip Boerdery, the Constitutional Court considered the nature of the state's positive obligations to give effect to section 34. (Note: President of the Republic of South Africa and Another v Modderklip Boerdery (Pty) Ltd (CCT20/04) [2005] ZACC 5; 2005 (5) SA 3 (CC); 2005 (8) BCLR 786 (CC).)

=== Arrest, detention, and trial ===
The longest section of the Bill of Rights, section 35 comprises a detailed list of rights which protect due process in criminal proceedings. Section 35(1) outlines the rights of persons "arrested for allegedly committing an offence", while section 35(2) outlines the right of persons "detained, including every sentenced prisoner". Section 35(3) guarantees every accused person's right to a fair trial, including, inter alia, the right to notice of the charge, right to a public trial, the right to a speedy trial, the right to legal representation, the right to be presumed innocent, the right to silence, the right against self-incrimination, the right against double jeopardy (called ne bis in idem in South African law), and the right of appeal or review.

Section 35(5) establishes an exclusionary rule, under which, "Evidence obtained in a manner that violates any right in the Bill of Rights must be excluded if the admission of that evidence would render the trial unfair or otherwise be detrimental to the administration of justice." The Constitutional Court has interpreted this provision in cases including S v Basson. Other landmark cases involving section 35 include S v Dzukuda; S v Tshilo, S v Singo, S v Thebus, and S v Bogaards.

== Limitation of rights ==
Rights contained in the Bill of Rights are not absolute and may be limited by way of specific limitation clauses where individual rights are subject to limitations set out in the individual Sections, e.g. Section 9 on equality. In addition, the Constitution provides a general limitation clause at Section 36, which provides for all rights in the Bill of Rights to be limited in terms of law of general application and that "limitations must be reasonable and justifiable in an open and democratic society based on human dignity, equality, and freedom." Any limitation must therefore be reasonable and may only be made with good cause. Limits should also be less restrictive.

Organs of state, such as the judiciary, the legislature, or the executive, may invariably limit rights in carrying out their functions. For example, by limiting the freedom of a prisoner. Further, because of the horizontal application of the Bill of Rights, rights may be limited by the actions or decisions of other persons. The courts are empowered to test the validity of the limitation in terms of S36.

Section 36 provides certain factors that must be taken into account by the courts when determining if a limitation is reasonable and justifiable:

- The nature of the right.
- The importance of the limitation
- The nature and extent of the limitation
- The relation between the limitation and its purpose, and
- Less restrictive means to achieve the purpose.

These factors are not absolute and other factors that the court may deem necessary may also be taken into account. When the nature of the right is considered, the courts will have to take into account the content of the right, the importance of the right and the interest which is protected. It is, for instance, very difficult to justifiably limit the right to life as the Constitutional Court held in S v Makwanyane where capital punishment was abolished. The promotion and protection of a permissible or lawful public interest will be important when considering the limitation and its purpose. Further, the Constitution requires a less restrictive means to be considered, rather than limiting the rights of an individual, in achieving that purpose.

=== Comparison with other human rights instruments ===
The limitations clause under section 36 has been compared to similar clauses in the European Convention on Human Rights. Specifically, there are limits on privacy rights (Section 8(2)), "except such as is in accordance with the law and is necessary in a democratic society", limits on freedom of thought and religion (art. 9(2)), "subject only to such limitations as are prescribed by law and are necessary for a democratic society," etc. In Canada, the Canadian Charter of Rights and Freedoms was adopted in 1982. Section 1 of that Charter, like section 36 of the South African law, states that rights are "subject only to such reasonable limits prescribed by law as can be demonstrably justified in a free and democratic society."

=== States of emergency ===
Section 37 of the Bill of Rights pertains expressly to states of emergency and concomitant derogation of rights.

== Enforcement of the Bill of Rights ==
Sections 38 and 39 deal with "Enforcement of rights" and "Interpretation of Bill of Rights" respectively. In respect of interpretation, Section 39(1) provides that the interpretation of the Bill of Rights must promote "the values that underlie an open and democratic society based on human dignity, equality and freedom", must consider international law, and may consider foreign law. However, these sections are most significant for entrenching the justiciability of the Bill of Rights.

=== Direct enforcement ===
§38: Anyone listed in this section has the right to approach a competent court, alleging that a right in the Bill of Rights has been infringed or threatened, and the court may grant appropriate relief, including a declaration of rights. The persons who may approach a court are anyone acting in their own interest; anyone acting on behalf of another person who cannot act in their own name; anyone acting as a member of, or in the interest of, a group or class of persons; anyone acting in the public interest; and an association acting in the interest of its members.

Section 38 establishes an extremely generous doctrine of standing in rights disputes, providing that individuals may bring rights claims on their own behalf, on behalf of other individuals, in their capacity as a member of a group of persons, or "in the public interest". The outer limits of this standing have rarely been tested. In terms of Chapter Eight of the Constitution, the Constitutional Court is the highest court in all constitutional matters, though rights disputes are typically heard in the High Court of South Africa in the first instance.

=== Indirect enforcement ===
Section 39(3) provides that the Bill of Rights "does not deny the existence of any other rights or freedoms that are recognised or conferred by common law, customary law or legislation, to the extent that they are consistent with the Bill". However, importantly, section 39(2) provides that these other sources of law must be interpreted in conformance with the Bill of Rights:

When interpreting any legislation, and when developing the common law or customary law, every court, tribunal or forum must promote the spirit, purport and objects of the Bill of Rights.

Section 39(2) is often conceived as giving rise to a second, indirect manner of enforcing or applying the Bill of Rights. In this approach, the Bill of Rights is not used directly to resolve a dispute but instead is used indirectly to interpret or develop whatever non-constitutional law governs the dispute. Under the principle of avoidance, courts may prefer to attempt indirect application or enforcement before turning to direct application or enforcement.

==== Statutory interpretation ====
The import of section 39(2) for statutory interpretation was discussed in Investigating Directorate: Serious Economic Offences v Hyundai Motors, wherein the Constitutional Court found that "all statutes must be interpreted through the prism of the Bill of Rights" in the "spirit of transition and transformation [that] characterises the constitutional enterprise as a whole". Investigating Directorate also held that this approach requires a preference for "reading down" statutes, giving precedence to interpretations on which a given statutory provision does not limit any constitutional right.

==== Development of the common law ====
In connection with the common law, section 39(2) has particular import for the horizontal application of the Bill of Rights in private disputes. In practice, and notwithstanding some exceptions, the Bill of Rights is not generally directly enforced in private disputes at common law – that is, its provisions are rarely used to adjudicate the legality of private conduct. Instead, in part due to the principle of avoidance and in part due to the "opacity and apparent circularity" of section 8, courts generally prefer to deploy section 39(2) rather than section 8(2): that is, they prefer to develop the common law rather than apply constitutional rights directly to invalidate either private conduct or even prevailing common-law rules.

A landmark case in this regard was Barkhuizen v Napier, a contract law matter in which the Constitutional Court held that contractual provisions should be tested not against constitutional rights but against public policy, provided that public policy doctrine, in the constitutional era, has constitutional content which encompasses the values of the Bill of Rights. (Note: Barkhuizen v Napier (CCT72/05) [2007] ZACC 5; 2007 (5) SA 323 (CC); 2007 (7) BCLR 691 (CC).) Other important cases invoking section 39(2) include Carmichele v Minister of Safety and Security, S v Thebus, and S v Masiya, as well as Bhe v Magistrate, Khayelitsha in the customary law arena. In Carmichele, the Constitutional Court emphasised that section 39(2) imposes a "general obligation" on courts to develop the common law as necessary, irrespective of whether any party asks the court to do so; (Note: Carmichele v Minister of Safety and Security (CCT 48/00) [2001] ZACC 22; 2001 (4) SA 938 (CC); 2001 (10) BCLR 995 (CC).) and in Thebus, Deputy Chief Justice Dikgang Moseneke conceived of section 39(2) as providing constitutional authority and constitutional guidelines to the inherent and routine power of superior courts "to refashion and develop the common law in order to reflect the changing social, moral, and economic make-up of society". (Note: Thebus and Another v S (CCT36/02) [2003] ZACC 12; 2003 (6) SA 505 (CC); 2003 (10) BCLR 1100 (CC).)This constitutional judicial power to reshape the common law in line with the Bill of Rights is generally limited by the requirement that the common law must be developed incrementally and on a case-by-case basis, with reference to the particulars of the case before the court; per Currie and de Waal, "Some guidance on the new approach has to be provided, while room must be left for the courts to develop the principle on a case by case basis."
