= True Motives v Mahdi =

South African legal case

True Motives 84 (Pty) Ltd v Mahdi and Another is an important case in South African law, heard in the Supreme Court of Appeal (by Scott JA, Cameron JA, Heher JA, Jafta JA and Combrinck JA) on 28 August 2008, with judgment handed down on 3 March 2009. PM Kennedy SC appeared for the appellant. There was no appearance for the first respondent, while AE Franklin SC (with DL Wood) appeared for the second respondent and PJ Olsen SC (with AA Gabriel) for the amicus curiae.

== Facts ==
The appellant, True Motives 84 (Pty) Ltd, and the first respondent, Mahdi, were owners of adjoining properties. When the first respondent undertook extensive renovations to his property, the appellant objected, challenging the approval of the relevant building plans. The court a quo dismissed the application, and on appeal the issues were confined to

- the proper interpretation of the National Building Regulations and Building Standards Act;
- the duties of a local authority with regard to the approval of building plans; and
- the validity of the delegation of power to the plans examiner.

== Judgment ==
The court held that the appellant's case rested on the validity of the following propositions:

1. that, on a proper interpretation of section 7 of the Act, a local authority must be satisfied that the erection of a building, in consequence of its approval of a plan, will not derogate from the value of a neighbouring property; and
2. that the evidence led to the necessary inference that the decision-maker had either not applied his mind to derogation of value or had done so in a superficial manner which fell short of achieving the satisfaction which section 7(1)(b)(ii) required of him.

The court first considered the proper scope of the duties that section 7(1)(a) and (b) of the Act imposes on a local authority. On a proper interpretation of section 7(1)(a), the local authority must refuse approval of plans where the plans do not comply with the Act and any other applicable law, and also when the local authority remains in doubt as to the scope of the plans. Thus, the test imposed by section 7(1)(a) requires the local authority to be positively satisfied that the parameters of the test laid down are met.

Next, the court turned to consider whether the facts justified the appellant's complaint that the person considering the plans did not apply his mind or, if he did, should have been satisfied that its property would probably suffer a reduction in value if the building were erected. The court found that the issues raised by the appellant in his objection to first respondent's renovations were all considered by the authority. The appellant was unable to show that the local authority misdirected itself in either its legal interpretation or factual application of section 7(1)(b)(ii) and, accordingly, failed to establish any basis for the court to have interfered in the exercise of its discretion.

The court also found no merit in the challenge to the delegation of power to the plans examiner. The majority of the court therefore dismissed the appeal.

The minority judgment was based on the interpretation of the Act. The minority view was that the majority judgment's interpretation was contrived, and that the ordinary meaning of section 7 should be accepted.

== See also ==
- Administrative law
- Constitutional law
- Constitution of South Africa
- Law of South Africa
- Stare decisis
- Legal interpretation in South Africa
