= Prince v Law Society =

South African legal case

- Court: Constitutional Court of South Africa
- Full case name: Garreth Prince v President of the Law Society, Cape of Good Hope and Others
- Decided: 25 January 2002
- Docket nos.: CCT 36/00
- Citations: [2002] ZACC 1; 2002 (2) SA 794; 2002 (3) BCLR 231

Case history
- Appealed from: Supreme Court of Appeal – Prince v President of the Law Society, Cape of Good Hope and Others [2000] ZASCA 172; High Court of South Africa, Cape Provincial Division – Prince v President of the Law Society, Cape of Good Hope and Others 1998 (8) BCLR 976 (C)
- Related action: Prince v President of the Law Society of the Cape of Good Hope and Others [2000] ZACC 28 (leave to deliver further evidence)

Court membership
- Judges sitting: Chaskalson CJ, Ackermann, Goldstone, Kriegler, Mokgoro, Ngcobo, Sachs and Yacoob JJ, and Madlanga AJ

Case opinions
- Decision by: Chaskalson CJ, Ackermann and Kriegler JJ (Goldstone and Yacoob concurring)
- Dissent: Ngcobo J (Mokgoro, Sachs and Madlanga concurring)
- Dissent: Sachs J (Mokgoro concurring)

Prince v President of the Law Society of the Cape of Good Hope and Others is a 2002 decision of the Constitutional Court of South Africa in the area of criminal law. It concerned the constitutionality of criminalising cannabis given Rastafaris' constitutional right to freedom of religion. A majority of the court held that the Constitution did not obligate the state to exempt bona fide religious uses from statutory prohibitions against cannabis use and possession.

The court divided sharply on the issue, with the bench split five to four. Chief Justice Arthur Chaskalson, Justice Laurie Ackermann, and Justice Johann Kriegler wrote for the majority, while Justice Sandile Ngcobo, for the minority, argued that a religious exemption would protect Rastafaris' constitutional rights without any severe detriment to the government's policy objectives.

== Background ==
Having completed two law degrees, Garreth Prince sought to gain admission as an attorney of the High Court of South Africa. In terms of the Attorneys Act, 1979, a prerequisite for such admission was a period of community service, but the Law Society of the Cape of Good Hope declined to register his contract of community service. Prince had disclosed to the Law Society that he had two previous criminal convictions for possession of cannabis and that he intended to continue using cannabis in adherence to the Rastafari religion. The Law Society took the view that, given statutory prohibitions on the use and possession of cannabis, this made Prince unfit for admission as an attorney.

== Prior action ==
Prince approached the Cape High Court to challenge the Law Society's decision, alleging that it infringed upon various of his constitutional rights. During proceedings in the High Court, he additionally raised the constitutionality of the Drugs and Drug Trafficking Act, 1992, the statute which criminalised cannabis use and possession. The Minister of Justice and the Attorney General of the Cape of Good Hope were therefore granted leave to intervene; both opposed the application. At the same time, the Attorney General brought to the court's attention the fact that a similar statutory prohibition was contained in the Medicines and Related Substances Control Act, 1965.

The High Court ruled that the statutory prohibitions on cannabis use and possession limited Prince's constitutional rights, but it found that this limitation was not unconstitutional because it was justifiable in terms of section 36 of the Constitution. Prince appealed to the Supreme Court of Appeal, where he presented the narrower argument that the laws were unconstitutional to the extent that they failed to allow for a religious exemption. In May 2000, on behalf of a unanimous bench, Judge of Appeal Joos Hefer rejected this argument and dismissed the appeal.

== 2000 proceedings ==
Prince appealed the Supreme Court's decision to the Constitutional Court of South Africa, which heard the matter on 16 November 2000. Its coram comprised Justice President Arthur Chaskalson, Deputy President Pius Langa, Acting Justice Mbuyiseli Madlanga, and Justices Laurie Ackermann, Richard Goldstone, Johann Kriegler, Yvonne Mokgoro, Sandile Ngcobo, Kate O'Regan, Albie Sachs, and Zak Yacoob. Prince reprised his argument that the relevant statutory provisions were overbroad to the extent that they failed to provide an exemption applicable to the use and possession of cannabis by Rastafari for religious purposes, in violation of the section 15 right to individual freedom of religion and, in some cases, the section 31 rights of the Rastafari religious community. His appeal was opposed by the Attorney General and the Minister of Health; the Law Society and Minister of Justice filed notice of their intention to abide the court's decision.

However, the court found that, partly because Prince's High Court challenge had initially been directed at the Law Society's conduct, there was insufficient evidence on record to decide the constitutional issue. Thus on 12 December 2000, Justice Ngcobo delivered a unanimous judgment which granted leave to deliver further evidence. Prince was permitted to deliver novel evidence on the use and possession of cannabis by Rastafari in South Africa, while the state respondents were permitted to deliver novel evidence on the practical and administrative duties of implementing a religious exemption for the sacramental use of cannabis.

At the same time, and incidentally, the court struck down as invalid section 12(1)(b) of the Supreme Court Act, 1959. That provision appeared to require that, when considering the validity of an act of Parliament, the Supreme Court of Appeal should sit as a bench of eleven judges; this raised a question as to the validity of the foregoing proceedings in the Supreme Court (where there had been a bench of five). However, the Constitutional Court found that the relevant provision was inconsistent with the Interim Constitution and had lost its force when that Constitution came into operation in April 1994.

Further evidence having been delivered, the Constitutional Court heard argument on the merits on 17 May 2001 and handed down its final judgment on 25 January 2002. The coram remained the same except that Justice Langa (by then the Deputy Chief Justice) and Justice O'Regan were absent.

== Judgment ==
=== Majority judgment ===
The Constitutional Court's majority judgment was co written by Chief Justice Chaskalson and Justices Ackermann and Kriegler, and it was joined by Justices Goldstone and Yacoob. The majority agreed with Prince that cannabis criminalisation limited the constitutional rights of Rastafari, but it held that this limitation was justifiable under section 36 of the Constitution.

In this regard, the majority emphasised in particular their finding that less invasive means were not available for achieving the government's legitimate purpose of curtailing the drug trade and thereby minimising the harm of drug abuse. In particular, a religious exemption would be extremely difficult to enforce, as the American experience in Employment Division v. Smith illustrated; for example, law enforcement officials would have "no objective way" of distinguishing bona fide religious use of cannabis from recreational use. In these circumstances, a religious exemption would substantially impair the state's ability to "enforce its drug legislation" and honour its concomitant obligations under international treaties. Thus it was not "incumbent on the state to devise some form of exception to the general prohibition against the possession or use of cannabis in order to cater for the religious rights of Rastafarians".

=== Dissenting judgments ===
The leading dissenting judgment was written by Justice Ngcobo and joined by Justice Mokgoro, Justice Sachs, and Acting Justice Madlanga. This minority would have upheld the appeal, finding that the absence of a religious exemption was not justifiable under section 36:

The constitutional defect in the two statutes is that they are overbroad. They are not carefully tailored to constitute a minimal intrusion upon the right to freedom of religion and they are disproportionate to their purpose. They are constitutionally bad because they do not allow for the religious use of cannabis that is not necessarily harmful and that can be controlled effectively.

Ngcobo placed particular emphasis on the "profound" impact on Rastafari of the rights limitation, arguing that the limitation had the effect of stating "that in the eyes of the legal system all Rastafari are criminals" and "that their religion is not worthy of protection". On this basis, he found that the absence of a religious exemption implicated not only the right to freedom of religion but also the right to human dignity. Moreover, unlike the majority, the minority believed that granting a religious exemption would not have a fatal impact on the state's objectives in seeking to regulate drug use and trade: the religious exemption would only involve "uses that pose no risk of harm and that can effectively be regulated and subjected to government control".

Justice Sachs also wrote a separate dissent, joined by Justice Mokgoro, in which he expressed his agreement with Ngcobo's proportionality analysis, arguing that, "where there are practices that might fall within a general legal prohibition, but that do not involve any violation of the Bill of Rights, the Constitution obliges the state to walk the extra mile". His opinion also raised several additional and complementary considerations, including reflections on the religious intolerance historically faced by Rastafari in South Africa.

== Significance and aftermath ==
Prince was regarded as a landmark judgment in the Constitutional Court's early jurisprudence on freedom of religion.

Prince subsequently reframed his constitutional argument as an attack on the criminalisation of personal cannabis use as an invasion of the constitutional right to privacy. That attack succeeded in the Constitutional Court in 2018 in Minister of Justice and Constitutional Development v Prince.
