= S v Masiya =

South African legal case

S v Masiya is an important case in South African criminal law, decided by the Constitutional Court.

== Facts ==
The accused was charged in a regional court with rape, in that, on a certain day in 2004, he had sexual intercourse with the complainant, then a nine-year-old girl. On the day the act was committed, the legislation creating a new statutory crime of rape had not yet existed. The accused was charged with common-law rape.

The evidence brought to light that the accused had not inserted his penis into the complainant's vagina, but into her anus. The state argued that the accused had to be convicted of the common-law crime of indecent assault, because, in terms of the rules of common law then applicable, such conduct did not qualify as rape, but only as indecent assault. At that time the common-law crime of rape could be committed only if an accused had sexually penetrated the complainant's vagina.

In a surprising move, however, the regional court magistrate held that the common-law definition of rape was unconstitutional, inasmuch as sexual penetration of the complainant's anus was not punishable as rape, but only as indecent assault. The magistrate argued that indecent assault was a less serious crime than rape, and that a conviction of a less serious crime discriminated against the complainant, since there were no rational grounds upon which non-consensual penetration of a woman's anus, instead of her vagina, should be regarded, not as rape, but only as indecent assault. The magistrate also held that a magistrate's court has the power to consider the constitutionality of a rule of the common law and, if necessary, to change it. The magistrate accordingly convicted the accused of rape.

The Criminal Law Amendment Act 105 of 1997 provides that the magistrate does not have the power to impose punishment in such a serious matter as the present. The case had to be referred to the High Court for the purpose of the imposition of punishment. This was done.

The High court confirmed the decision of the magistrate's court, but the imposition of punishment was postponed until the Constitutional Court had confirmed the change in the definition of the common- law crime of rape.

The Constitutional Court therefore had to decide whether the magistrate's court and the High Court had acted correctly in broadening the definition of the common-law crime of rape on the ground that the old definition had been unconstitutional.

== Arguments ==
The High Court had emphasised the alleged inequality and discrimination engendered by the definition, and the resultant inadequate and discriminatory sentences. In oral argument, counsel for Mr Masiya argued against the development only if the developed definition of rape were to apply to him. The DPP and amici substantially supported the judgment of the High Court, arguing that the definition perpetuates gender inequality and promotes discrimination. The DPP further contended that the definition perpetuates leniency in sentencing.

The Minister opposed the development. She relied on the decision of the Constitutional Court in S v Mhlungu to contend that the Regional Court should have decided the guilt or otherwise of Mr Masiya on the facts, and without considering the constitutional issue of developing the definition of rape.

The amici, likewise, contended that, apart from the gendered nature of the origins of the definition, the elements of the crime of rape perpetuate gender stereotypes and discrimination because they are suggestive of the fact that only males can commit the crime, and only females can be raped. They argued that, once it is recognised that the primary motive for rape is not sexual lust, but the desire to gain power or control over another person, with sex being the violent means by which that power is exercised, the rationale for maintaining the gender distinction falls away.

== Judgment ==
Nkabinde J determined that the primary questions to be considered were the following:

- whether the current definition of rape was inconsistent with the Constitution, and whether the definition needed to be developed;
- whether Mr Masiya was liable to be convicted in terms of the developed definition;
- whether the declaration of invalidity of the relevant statutory provisions should be confirmed;
- whether the merits of the criminal conviction should be dealt with by Constitutional Court; and
- appropriate relief.

=== Constitutionality of the definition ===
Nkabinde J found it useful to examine the historical perspective of the criminalisation of rape, so as to determine its developmental direction. The word "rape" originates from the Latin words raptus, rapio and rapina, respectively meaning "tearing off, rending away, carrying off, abduction, rape, plundering;" "to seize, snatch, tear away, to plunder a place, to hurry along a person or thing;" and "robbery, pillage, booty plunder". As such, raptus in Roman law was generally understood as an offence consisting of the violent "carrying away" of women, and is better translated, in Nkabinde J's view, as "abduction.

The crime of rape in Roman law, Nkabinde J found, was based on a prohibition of unchaste behaviour. Punishment for non-consensual sexual intercourse protected the interests of the society in penalising unchaste behaviour, rather than the interests of the survivor.

In this period, patriarchal societies criminalised rape to protect the property rights of men over women. The patriarchal structure of families subjected women entirely to the guardianship of their husbands, and gave men a civil right not only over their spouses' property, but also over their spouses' persons. Roman-Dutch law placed force at the centre of the definition, with the concomitant requirement of "hue and cry" to indicate a woman's lack of consent. Submission to intercourse through fear, duress, fraud or deceit, as well as intercourse with an unconscious or mentally impaired woman, did not constitute rape but a lesser offence of stuprum.

In English law the focus originally was on the use of force to overcome a woman's resistance. By the mid-eighteenth century, force was no longer required for the conduct to constitute rape. The scope of the definition was increased to include cases of fraud or deception. This latter definition was adopted in South Africa.

In indigenous law, Nkabinde J wrote, rape was restrictively defined. Generally, the law stressed the responsibility of a group rather than of the individual. For instance, in Pedi law, in rape cases women must be assisted by their fathers or husbands. Compensation accrued not to the survivor but to her household, under the guardianship of the husband or the father. The law excluded cases of sodomy and marital rape. In some communities, intercourse with a prepubescent girl-child was also excluded from the definition. These acts often constituted merely assault or "unnatural sexuality."

It is evident to Nkabinde J, from the history of the law of rape, that the object of the criminalisation of rape was to protect the economic interests of the father, husband or guardian of the female survivor of rape, to perpetuate stereotypes, male dominance and power, and to refer to females as objects.

With the advent of South Africa's constitutional dispensation, based on the democratic values of human dignity, equality and freedom, the social foundation of these rules had, in Nkabinde J's view, disappeared. Although she believed that the great majority of females, for the most part in rural South Africa, remained trapped in cultural patterns of sex-based hierarchy, there had been, she noted, a gradual movement towards recognition of a female as the survivor of rape, "rather than other antiquated interests or societal morals being at the core of the definition." The focus was now on the breach of "a more specific right such as the right to bodily integrity" and security of the person, and the right to be protected from degradation and abuse. The crime of rape, wrote Nkabinde J, should therefore be seen in that context.

=== Current law ===
In South African law, as Nkabinde J was writing, rape was understood as the non-consensual penetration of a vagina by a penis. The generally accepted definition of rape, according to Heath J in S v Ncanywa, was "the (a) intentional (b) unlawful (c) sexual intercourse with a woman (d) without her consent." Heath J remarked that "the element of unlawfulness is based essentially on the absence of consent."

The four elements in the definition of rape were echoed by Van der Merwe J in S v Zuma, in which the absence of mens rea was relevant. The scholars Burchell and Milton stated that the definition of rape is "the intentional unlawful sexual intercourse with a woman without her consent." Snyman preferred this definition: "Rape consists in a male having unlawful and intentional sexual intercourse with a female without her consent." Nkabinde J noted that both shared an understanding of "sexual intercourse" as the "penetration of the woman's vagina by the male penis."

The definitions presupposed non-consensual sexual penetration of a vagina by a penis. Nkabinde J held that the definition of rape was not unconstitutional insofar as it criminalised conduct that was clearly morally and socially unacceptable. In this regard it was different from the common-law crime of sodomy, which had been declared unconstitutional by the Constitutional Court because it subjected people to criminal penalties for conduct which could not constitute a crime in the new constitutional order. Nkabinde J could find nothing in the current definition of rape to suggest that it was fatally flawed in a similar manner:

The current definition of rape criminalises unacceptable social conduct that is in violation of constitutional rights. It ensures that the constitutional right to be free "from all forms of violence, whether public or private, as well as the right to dignity and equality are protected. Invalidating the definition because it is under-inclusive is to throw the baby out with the bath water. What is required then is for the definition to be extended instead of being eliminated so as to promote the spirit, purport and objects of the Bill of Rights.

Moreover, continued Nkabinde J, the current law of rape has been affected by statutory developments in recent decades. In 1993, the rule that a husband could not rape his wife, the so-called marital rape exemption, was abolished; the presumption that a boy is incapable of committing rape was abolished in 1987. There had also been changes to the law of evidence relating to sexual offences. These changes, wrote the judge, reflected South African society's changing understanding of rape:

Due in no small part to the work of women's rights activists, there is wider acceptance that rape is criminal because it affects the dignity and personal integrity of women. The evolution of our understanding of rape has gone hand in hand with women's agitation for the recognition of their legal personhood and right to equal protection. To this end, women in South Africa and the rest of the world have mobilised against the patriarchal assumption that underlay the traditional definition of rape. They have focused attention on the unique violence visited upon women. Much of this activism focused on creating support systems for women, such as rape crisis centres and abuse shelters; and also on the process whereby rape is investigated and prosecuted. It is now widely accepted that sexual violence and rape not only offend the privacy and dignity of women but also reflect the unequal power relations between men and women in our society.

The facts of the present matter, Nkabinde J determined, did not require the court to consider whether or not the definition of rape should be extended to include non-consensual penetration of the male anus by a penis. Arguments were presented to the court, which Nkabinde J considered to be strong, to the effect that gender specificity in relation to rape reflected patriarchal stereotypes inconsistent with the Constitution. This court had stressed previously, however, that it is not desirable that a case be dealt with on the basis of what the facts might be, rather than what they are.

Nkabinde J conceded, though, that it could hardly be said that non-consensual anal penetration of males is less degrading, humiliating and traumatic, and (quoting a phrase of Brownmiller's) "a lesser violation of the personal private inner space, a lesser injury to mind, spirit and sense of self." That this is so, the judge continued, does not mean that it is unconstitutional to have a definition of rape which is gender-specific. Focusing on anal penetration of females should not be seen, therefore, as disrespectful to male bodily integrity, or insensitive to the trauma suffered by male victims of anal violation, especially boys of the age of the complainant in casu:

Extending the definition to include non-consensual penetration of the anus of the male by a penis may need to be done in a case where the facts require such a development. It needs to be said that it is not constitutionally impermissible to develop the common law of rape in this incremental way. This Court has stated that in a constitutional democracy such as ours the Legislature and not the Courts has the major responsibility for law reform and the delicate balance between Courts' functions and powers on the one hand and those of the Legislature on the other should be recognised and respected.

As Chaskalson P had written in Ferreira v Levin NO and Others; Vryenhoek and Others v Powell NO and Others, the terrains of the courts and the legislature should be kept separate, even though they may overlap. Nkabinde J had no doubt that the issue of male rape would be dealt with in an appropriate fashion either by the legislature or the courts "when the circumstances make it appropriate and necessary to do so."

The constitutional role of the courts in the development of the common law had to be distinguished from their other role: considering whether or not legislative provisions are consistent with the Constitution:

The latter role is one of checks and balances on the power provided for in our Constitution, whereby courts are empowered to ensure that legislative provisions are constitutionally compliant. The development of the common law on the other hand is a power that has always vested in our Courts. It is exercised in an incremental fashion as the facts of each case require.

This incremental manner had not changed, wrote Nkabinde J, but the Constitution, in section 39(2), provided a paramount substantive consideration relevant to determining whether the common law required development in any particular case. This did not detract from the constitutional recognition that it is the Legislature which has the major responsibility for law reform:

Courts must be astute to avoid the appropriation of the Legislature's role in law reform when developing the common law. The greater power given to the Courts to test legislation against the Constitution should not encourage them to adopt a method of common-law development which is closer to codification than incremental, fact-driven development.

Accordingly, Nkabinde J concluded that the definition of rape was not inconsistent with the Constitution, but needed to be adapted appropriately. The question remained, therefore: Did the facts of this particular case require that the definition be developed so as to include anal penetration of a female?

=== Common-law development ===
The question of the development of the common law was discussed ("comprehensively," to Nkabinde J's mind) by Ackermann and Goldstone JJ in Carmichele v Minister of Safety & Security, in which was stressed the duty of the courts derived from sections 7, 8(1), 39(2) and 173 of the Constitution. The court sounded a reminder to judges, when developing the common law, to "be mindful of the fact that the major engine for law reform should be the Legislature and not the Judiciary." The court also repeated with approval the remarks of Iacobucci J in R v Salituro:

Judges can and should adapt the common law to reflect the changing social, moral and economic fabric of the country. Judges should not be quick to perpetuate rules whose social foundation has long since disappeared. Nonetheless there are significant constraints on the power of the Judiciary to change the law [...]. In a constitutional democracy such as ours it is the Legislature and not the courts which has the major responsibility for law reform [...]. The Judiciary should confine itself to those incremental changes which are necessary to keep the common law in step with the dynamic and evolving fabric of our society.

The court stated, however, that "courts must remain vigilant and should not hesitate to ensure that the common law is developed to reflect the spirit, purport and objects of the Bill of Rights [...] whether or not the parties in any particular case request the Court to develop the common law under s 39(2)." Where there is deviation from the spirit, purport and objects of the Bill of Rights, Nkabinde J added, courts are obliged to develop the common law by removing the deviation.

Nkabinde J said that the Minister may have been right to contend that the Regional Court should have decided the guilt or otherwise of Mr Masiya on the facts, without considering the constitutional issue of developing the definition of rape: "That might well have been the proper way to deal with the matter. The failure to do so is, in the circumstances of this case, of no consequence." When the matter was referred to the High Court in terms of section 52 of the Act, that court had had to determine whether the conviction was in accordance with justice before considering an appropriate sentence. The court called for further evidence and confirmed the conviction. Strictly speaking, wrote Nkabinde J, it was that finding (among others), not the finding by the regional court, against which leave to appeal was sought.

Nkabinde J turned next to the contention of the amici that the elements of the crime of rape perpetuate gender stereotypes and discrimination, because they are suggestive of the fact that only males can commit the crime, and only females can be raped, and that, once it is recognised that the primary motive for rape is to gain power over another person, the rationale for maintaining the gender distinction falls away. "That," she wrote,

might be so. However, for the reasons given above, it would not be appropriate for this Court to engage with these questions. In this respect there are three important considerations that favour restraint on the part of this Court. The first is that what is at issue is extending the definition of crime, something a Court should do only in exceptional circumstances. The second is that the development would entail statutory amendments and necessitate law reform. The third is that, historically, rape has been and continues to be a crime of which females are its systematic target. It is the most reprehensible form of sexual assault constituting as it does a humiliating, degrading and brutal invasion of the dignity and the person of the survivor. It is not simply an act of sexual gratification, but one of physical domination. It is an extreme and flagrant form of manifesting male supremacy over females.

Nkabinde J cited the Declaration on the Elimination of Violence against Women, which specifically enjoins member states to pursue policies to eliminate violence against women. Nonconsensual anal penetration of women and young girls is a form of violence against them equal in intensity and impact, Nkabinde J found, to that of non-consensual vaginal penetration:

The object of the criminalisation of this act is to protect the dignity, sexual autonomy and privacy of women and young girls as being generally the most vulnerable group in line with the values enshrined in the Bill of Rights—a cornerstone of our democracy.

Nkabinde J believed that the extended definition would protect the dignity of survivors, especially young girls who may not be able to differentiate between the different types of penetration. The evidence of Dr Grabe, an expert witness who testified in the High Court, that the complainant referred to a "hole" thinking that the anus is the only place she experiences as a "hole," clearly illustrated this point. Women and girls would be afforded "increased protection," wrote Nkabinde J, by the extended definition. She noted in addition that one of the social contexts of rape is the alarming high incidence of HIV-infection: "Anal penetration also results in the spread of HIV."

The consequences of non-consensual anal penetration might be different to those caused by non-consensual penetration of the vagina,

but the trauma associated with the former is just as humiliating, degrading and physically hurtful as that associated with the latter. The inclusion of penetration of the anus of a female by a penis in the definition will increase the extent to which the traditionally vulnerable and disadvantaged group will be protected by and benefit from the law. Adopting this approach would therefore harmonise the common law with the spirit, purport and objects of the Bill of Rights.

One of the important considerations arising out of the question whether or not to develop the current definition related to the appropriate weight to be given to the 2003 Bill, which was a work in progress.

"Essentially," wrote Nkabinde J, "the question is whether the conviction of rape is in accordance with justice even though the definition of rape did not include non-consensual anal penetration at the time the crime was committed." The High Court held that the principle of legality had no application in this case, since no new crime would be created if the definition were to be changed. It held that Mr Masiya knew that he was acting unlawfully when he assaulted the complainant, and that it had never been a requirement that an accused person should know, at the time of the commission of the crime, whether it is a common-law or statutory crime, or what its legal definition is. Mr Masiya contended that the extended definition should not apply to him, as the application would constitute a violation of his rights in terms of s 35(3)(l) of the Constitution.

The ordinary principle of common law is that, when a rule is developed, it applies to all cases, not only those which arise after the judgment has been handed down. As Kentridge AJ observed in Du Plessis and Others v De Klerk and Another,

In our Courts a judgment which brings about a radical alteration in the common law as previously understood proceeds upon the legal fiction that the new rule has not been made by the Court but merely "found", as if it had always been inherent in the law. Nor do our Courts distinguish between cases which have arisen before, and those which arise after, the new rule has been announced. For this reason it is sometimes said that "Judge- made law" is retrospective in its operation. In all this our Courts have followed the practice of the English Courts [.... I]t may nonetheless be said that there is no rule of positive law which would forbid our Supreme Court from departing from that practice.

Indeed, as Kentridge AJ pointed out, members of the Judicial Committee of the House of Lords in the United Kingdom have accepted that it may be appropriate, when the interests of justice require it, for a new rule of law developed by the courts to operate prospectively only.

B v Governor of Brockhill Prison, Ex parte Evans was a matter involving the unlawful detention of a prisoner. The governor had sentenced the prisoner on the basis of an interpretation of a statute which had originally been supported by the courts, but which had subsequently been held to be wrong. It was clear that the governor was blameless, but the sentence raised questions as to whether the new interpretation of the statute should apply prospectively only. The majority of the Law Lords held that, on the facts of that case, it was not appropriate for the interpretation to apply prospectively only, but all also accepted that the development of a rule might, in appropriate circumstances, apply prospectively. Lord Slynn of Hadley reasoned that "there may be decisions in which it would be desirable, and in no way unjust, that the effect of judicial rulings should be prospective or limited to certain claimants."

Under the South African constitutional order, noted Nkabinde J, the remedy of prospective overruling of a law that is inconsistent with the Constitution is permitted by the terms of section 172(1) (b) of the Constitution. In the present case she was not dealing with the court's remedial powers under section 172, as no order of constitutional invalidity had been made. The question was whether, when developing the common law, it was possible to do so prospectively only. In the view of Nkabinde J, it was:

In this case, if the definition of rape were to be developed retrospectively it would offend the constitutional principle of legality as I have demonstrated above. On the other hand, if we were to accept that the principle of legality is a bar to the development of the common law, the Courts could never develop the common law of crimes at all. In my view, such a conclusion would undermine the principles of our Constitution which require the courts to ensure that the common law is infused with the spirit, purport and objects of the Constitution. The impasse can be avoided by accepting that in these circumstances it is appropriate to develop the law prospectively only.

She accept that only in rare cases would it be appropriate to develop the common law with prospective effect only, as the Law Lords suggested in Brockhill Prison. In her opinion, however, this was one of those cases where fairness to the accused required that the development apply not to him, but only to those whose cases arose after judgment in the present matter had been handed down.

Nkabinde J continued, "One of the central tenets underlying the common-law understanding of legality is that of foreseeability—that the rules of criminal law are clear and precise so that an individual may easily behave in a manner that avoids committing crimes." In this regard, the amici had referred to the decision of the European Court of Human Rights in SW v United Kingdom, where the Court held as follows:

However clearly drafted a legal provision may be, in any system of law, including criminal law, there is an inevitable element of judicial interpretation. There will always be a need for elucidation of doubtful points and for adaptation to changing circumstances [...] provided that the resultant development is consistent with the essence of the offence and could reasonably be foreseen.

The European Court used the element of foreseeability and article 17 of the convention (intended to exclude the abuse of any specific rights safeguarded by the convention for any of the purposes set out in the article) to find that the accused's conviction of the rape of his wife was not an infringement of the principle of legality as contained in article 7(1) of the convention. In coming to its decision, the court emphasised the distinction between reinterpretation and clarification of the common law, on the one hand, and the creation, on the other, of a new common-law offence. It appeared to Nkabinde J that the court found the surprise element entailed by the retroactive application of the common law to be an unacceptable feature in that case.

The European Commission of Human Rights, in CR v United Kingdom, had relied heavily on the submission that there was ambiguity as to whether the marital immunity of rape was law:

In the present case, the trial judge, when rejecting the applicant's submission that marital immunity applied, doubted the extent to which it could ever have been permissible under the common law for a husband to beat his wife into having sexual intercourse with him [.... T]he Commission considers that by November 1989 there was significant doubt as to the validity of the alleged marital immunity for rape. As stated by the Court of Appeal in the applicant's case, lip service had been paid to the alleged general rule while the courts at the same time increased the number of exceptions. That there was uncertainty as to the width of the exceptions is apparent from the Law Commission Working Paper examining the question [....]

While there was no express authority for the proposition that an implied agreement of separation between husband or wife or unilateral withdrawal of consent by the wife would bring a case outside the marital immunity, the Commission takes the view that in the present case where the applicant's wife had withdrawn from cohabitation and there was de facto separation with the expressed intention of both to seek a divorce, there was a basis on which it could be anticipated that the courts could hold that the notional consent of the wife was no longer to be implied [.... T]he Commission considers that this adaptation in the application of the offence of rape was reasonably foreseeable to an applicant with appropriate legal advice.

Section 35(3)(l) of the Constitution, wrote Nkabinde J, confirmed a long-standing principle of the common law: Accused persons may not be convicted of offences where the conduct for which they are charged did not constitute an offence at the time it was committed. Although at first blush this provision might not seem to be implicated by finding Mr Masiya guilty of rape, "because the act he committed did constitute an offence both under national law and international law at the time he committed it, in my view, the jurisprudence of this Court would suggest otherwise."

Nkabinde J cited as authority the first case in which the Constitutional Court addressed section 35(3)(1) and its counterpart in respect of sentence, section 35(3)(n). In Veldman v Director of Public Prosecutions, Witwatersrand Local Division, the court held that the principle of legality is central to the rule of law under the Constitution. That case concerned the question of whether, where the sentencing jurisdiction of a court had been increased after an accused had pleaded, the accused could be sentenced in terms of the increased jurisdiction. The court held it could not, observing that, once an accused has pleaded, the constitutionally enshrined principle of legality requires that the sentencing jurisdiction of a court could not be varied to the detriment of the accused, even where it was clear that the increased sentence was a permissible sentence for the charge involved. The court held that "to retrospectively apply a new law, such as s 92(1) (a), during the course of the trial, and thereby to expose an accused person to a more severe sentence, undermines the rule of law and violates an accused person's right to a fair trial under s 35(3) of the Constitution."

The strong view of legality adopted in Veldman suggested to Nkabinde J that it would be unfair to convict Mr Masiya of an offence in circumstances where the conduct in question did not constitute the offence at the time of the commission:

I conclude so despite the fact that his conduct is a crime that evokes exceptionally strong emotions from many quarters of society. However, a development that is necessary to clarify the law should not be to the detriment of the accused person concerned unless he was aware of the nature of the criminality of his act. In this case, it can hardly be said that Mr Masiya was indeed aware, foresaw or ought reasonably to have foreseen that his act might constitute rape as the magistrate appears to suggest. The parameters of the trial were known to all parties before the Court and the trial was prosecuted, pleaded and defended on those bases. It follows therefore that he cannot and should not bear adverse consequences of the ambiguity created by the law as at the time of conviction.

The evidence adduced at the trial established that Mr Masiya was guilty of indecent assault. To convict him of rape, held Nkabinde J, would be in violation of his right in section 35(3)(l) of the Constitution. She concluded therefore that the developed definition should not apply to Mr Masiya.

=== Declaration of invalidity ===
The next question to be considered was whether or not the declaration of invalidity, referred to the Constitutional Court in terms of section 172(2)(a), should be confirmed. In deciding whether to develop the definition of rape, noted Nkabinde J, the Court was obliged to confine itself to the facts of the case: "It follows therefore that the Court cannot confirm the declaration of invalidity to the extent that it is based on conclusions relating to the gender-neutral nature of the crime, an issue that does not arise on the facts of this case."

The relevant declaration of invalidity concerned statutory provisions in the Act and the Criminal Procedure Act, as well as their respective Schedules, to the extent that they were gender-specific. Having decided to extend the definition of rape to include anal penetration of both males and females, the High Court in consequence made an order reading the word "person" into the statutory provisions wherever reference is made to a specific gender.

Nkabinde J concluded that the definition of rape should be extended so as to include anal penetration of a female, but that the question of non-consensual penetration of the penis into the anus of another male should be left open. That being so, there was no need for the court to address the declaration of invalidity of the statutory provisions made by the High Court. In conclusion, then, Nkabinde J declined to confirm the declarations of invalidity in paragraph 3 of the order.

=== Merits ===
Masiya had challenged the decision of the regional court mostly on various factual grounds, urging the Constitutional Court to consider the merits of the conviction. In effect, Masiya sought leave to appeal to the Constitutional Court on the merits of his conviction. Nkabinde decided this question as follows:

Even if it could be said that in this regard his application raises a constitutional issue, which is unlikely given this Court's judgment in S v Boesak, it is not in the interests of justice to grant him leave to appeal directly to this Court on this issue. Mr Masiya has still not been sentenced and once he has been, he will have the right to seek leave to appeal to the appropriate court in the ordinary way. In that sense, his application for leave to appeal on the merits is premature. Accordingly, the application for leave to appeal on the merits of his conviction should be refused.

=== Magistrates' power to develop common law in respect of crimes ===
"I must dispose of one further matter," wrote Nkabinde J, "before I deal with the relief. That relates to the question whether the magistrates' courts have the power to develop the common law." She found it necessary to consider whether magistrates' courts had the power to develop the common law to bring it in line with the Constitution.

The High Court had held that the magistrate's court was not explicitly excluded from pronouncing upon the constitutional validity of crimes at common law. It was necessary to consider the constitutional jurisdiction of these courts, since the Constitutional Court had not considered this question before:

Although magistrates' courts are at the heart of the application of the common law on a daily basis and, in most instances, courts of first instance in criminal cases, there are legitimate reasons why they are not included under s 173 and why their powers are attenuated. Magistrates are constrained in their ability to develop crimes at common law by virtue of the doctrine of precedent. Their pronouncements on the validity of common-law criminal principles would create a fragmented and possibly incoherent legal order. An effective operation of the development of common-law criminal principles depends on the maintenance of a unified and coherent legal system, a system maintained through the recognised doctrine of stare decisis which is aimed at avoiding uncertainty and confusion, protecting vested rights and legitimate expectations of individuals, and upholding the dignity of the judicial system. Moreover, and contrary to the view held by the magistrate in his judgment, there does not seem to be any constitutional or legislative mandate for all cases in which a magistrate might see fit to develop the common law in line with the Constitution to be referred to higher courts for confirmation. Such a referral might mitigate the disadvantageous factors discussed above.

The suggestion by the High Court that magistrates are empowered to vary the elements of crimes in the light of the Constitution was therefore, in the opinion of Nkabinde J, incorrect.

=== Relief ===
Section 172(1)(b) of the Constitution conferred a discretion on the Constitutional Court to make any order that is just and equitable. Having found that the common-law definition of rape was not constitutionally invalid, but merely falls short of the spirit, purport and objects of the Bill of Rights, the declaration of invalidity of the definition of rape was therefore set aside, to be replaced with an appropriate order.

Having found that the developed definition of rape could not apply to Mr Masiya, it could not be said, on the facts before the court, that his conviction was in accordance with justice: "The conviction of rape should, on the facts, be replaced with a conviction of indecent assault." The order of the High Court therefore could not stand, so the appeal against the conviction of rape was upheld.

Having substituted the conviction of rape with that of indecent assault, Nkabinde J found it necessary to remit the matter to the regional court to impose appropriate punishment:

It needs be said that the offence of indecent assault is egregious. Mr Masiya assaulted a nine-year-old child. The offence arouses public indignation. The regional court is obliged, when considering an appropriate punishment, to apply its mind to the nature and gravity of the offence of which Mr Masiya has been convicted and not merely look at the legal definition thereof. The fact that he has been convicted of indecent assault does not automatically mean that the sentence to be imposed upon him should be more lenient than if he had been convicted of rape.

== Order ==
After thanking counsel for their assistance, Nkabinde J made the following order:

1. "The application for leave to appeal against the declarations of invalidity and the order and judgment of the High Court confirming the conviction of Mr Masiya of rape is granted.
2. "The application for leave to appeal against the conviction on the merits is dismissed.
3. "The order of the High Court is set aside in its entirety.
4. "The order of the regional court referring the criminal proceedings to the High Court for purposes of sentence in terms of s 52(1)(b)(i) of the Criminal Law Amendment Act 105 of 1997, is set aside.
5. "The common-law definition of rape is extended to include acts of non-consensual penetration of a penis into the anus of a female.
6. "The development of the common law referred to in para 5 above shall be applicable only to conduct which takes place after the date of judgment in this matter.
7. "The conviction of Mr Masiya by the regional court of rape is set aside and replaced with a conviction of indecent assault.
8. "The case is remitted to the regional court for Mr Masiya to be sentenced in the light of this judgment."

Moseneke DCJ, Kondile J; Madala J, Mokgoro J, O'Regan J, Van der Westhuizen J, Yacoob J and Van Heerden AJ concurred with the judgment of Nkabinde J.

=== Langa CJ ===
Langa CJ, with whom Sachs J concurred, wrote a separate short judgment in which he agreed with the judgment of Nkabinde J, but went even further. According to him, the new, broader definition of common-law rape must be so wide as to include nonconsensual sexual penetration of the anus of either a female or a male. In her majority judgment, Nkabinde J held that only non-consensual sexual penetration of a woman through her anus should be included in the definition.

== Criticism ==
The judgment was controversial and much criticised. "It amounts," wrote the academic CR Snyman,

to a disturbing undermining of the principle of legality in criminal law. The Constitutional Court has arrogated to itself the power to change the definitions of crimes, and more particularly of broadening the ambit of the field of application of a crime.

He argued that it was wrong to say that the definition of common-law rape was irrational and discriminatory:

The difference between sexual penetration by a man of a woman through her vagina (which, according to the common law, is rape) and such penetration through her anus (which, according to the common law, is not rape but indecent assault) in fact rests on a completely rational basis, namely the following: First, there is an anatomical difference between men and a women. Below the waist men have only one orifice that can be sexually penetrated, namely the anus. Women, on the other hand, have two such orifices, namely the anus as well as the vagina. To regard this difference as amounting to discrimination or inequality is incorrect. It amounts to "putting God in the dock" because He (or She, or evolution, or whoever or whatever one believes to have created the world and mankind), by creating two different types of people (men and women), failed to obey the currently "politically correct" principle that there ought to be no differences between people. Second, the function of a woman's vagina and that of her anus are fundamentally different: the way in which the human species procreates is by the male discharging his semen into the woman's vagina, as opposed to her anus. Penile penetration of the vagina may result in the woman becoming pregnant. The danger of pregnancy is absent if the woman is penetrated anally, even if there had been an emission of semen. This results in a woman's vagina playing a privileged role in her biological makeup. A woman's vagina and her anus are not simply two species of the same genus. One of the most important reasons for the existence of the crime of rape is the danger of the woman becoming pregnant against her will. Non-consensual penile penetration of the vagina violates the most personal of all the parts of a woman's body. It infringes her whole being and identity as a woman, as opposed to a man. Accordingly vaginal and anal penetration deserve to be treated separately. This is precisely what the common law did.

For Snyman, the most important criticism to make against the judgment

is that it creates a disturbing precedent. The court works with the following principle: if the court is of the opinion that conduct which at present does not fall within the definition ought to fall thereunder because it is analogous to conduct falling thereunder, that both types of conduct (that which falls thereunder and that which does not fall thereunder) relate to the same right or rights protected in the Bill of Rights, and that both types of conduct deserve the same punishment, then a court is free to extend the definition of the crime by holding that the conduct which formerly did not form part of the definition should now indeed form part of the definition. If one applies this principle, there are many crimes of which the definitions are now no longer certain. Thus the definition of housebreaking may be extended to include acts whereby a person breaks into a motor car (conduct which presently does not qualify as housebreaking because a motor car is a movable thing); the definition of arson may be extended to include cases in which one sets fire to a movable object such as a motor car or a railway truck (conduct which presently does not qualify as arson); and the definition of such a well-known crime as theft may now be extended to include cases in which one appropriates non-corporeal things, such as a tune, an idea, an architectural plan, or a plot of a story.

Section 39(2) of the Constitution, on which the court relied, could not be used, in Snyman's view, as an argument to circumvent the clear provisions of subsections 35(3)(l) and (n), which prohibited the creation of new crimes or the extension of the scope of existing ones. Section 35 formed part of the Bill of Rights; section 39 dealt with the interpretation of the Bill of Rights. According to Snyman,

The court wrongly uses what it calls "the incremental development of the common law" as a vehicle to evade the clear provisions of section 35 of the Bill of Rights. Section 39(2) may be used to remove uncertainties or ambiguities in the present definitions of crimes or to hold that certain forms of conduct do not fall within the definition of a crime. Apart from this, the "promotion of the spirit, purport and objects of the Bill of Rights" [...] is more applicable to the field of civil law than to the field of criminal law.

== See also ==
- Rape
- South African criminal law
