= Veldman =

Veldman is a Dutch surname translating as "field man". Notable people with the surname include:

- Didy Veldman (born 1967), Dutch ballet dancer and choreographer
- Elfried Veldman (1966–1989), Dutch-Surinamese footballer
- Hayke Veldman (born 1969), Dutch politician
- Matt Veldman (born 1988), American football player
- John Veldman (born 1968), Dutch football defender
- Wybo Veldman (born 1946), New Zealand rower

== See also ==
- Veldman v DPP, Witwatersrand, a South African criminal law case
- Veltman, Dutch surname of the same origin
