= Reddy v Siemens =

South African legal case

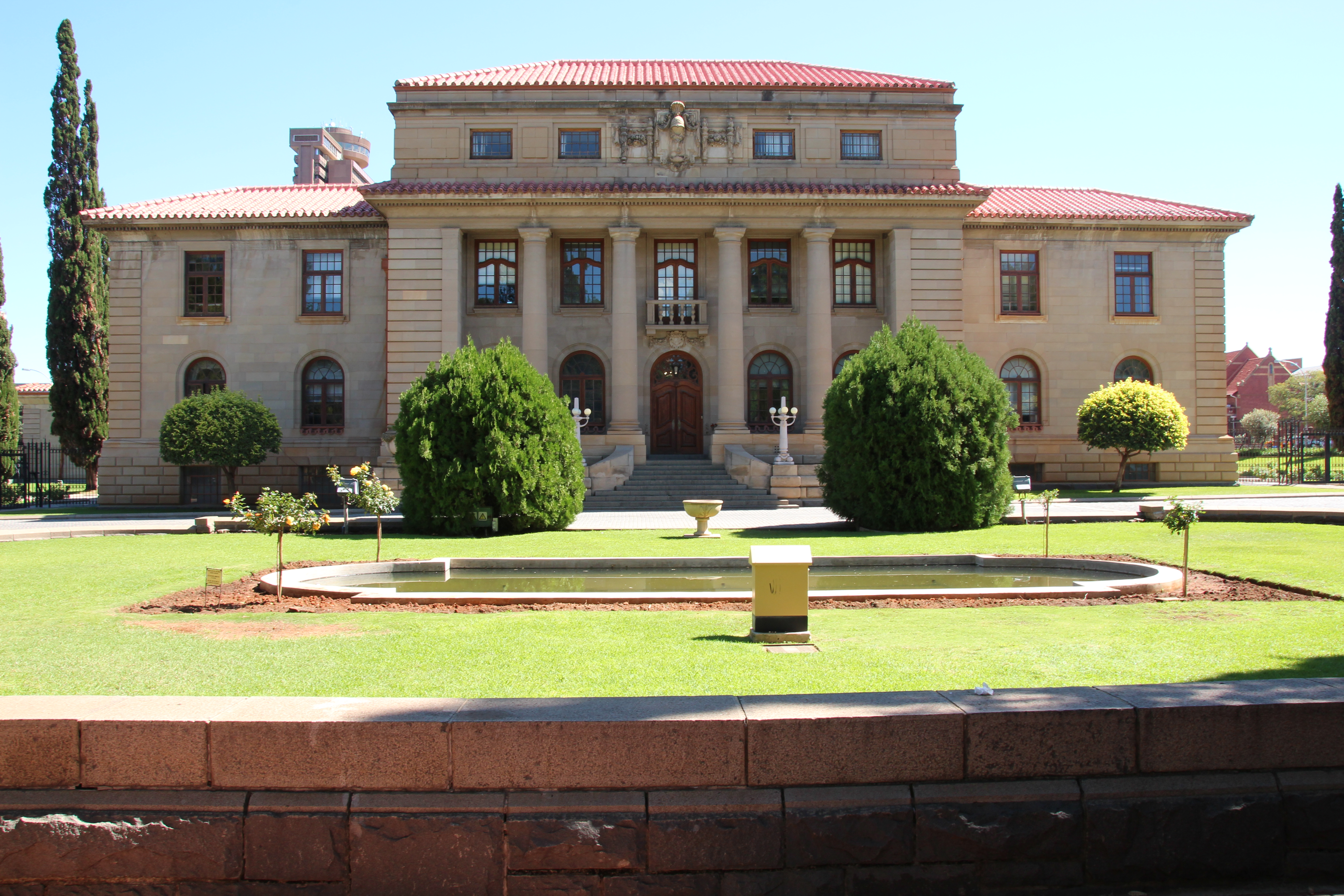
- Court: Supreme Court of Appeal (South Africa)
- Full case name: Dayandren Reddy v Siemens Telecommunications (Pty) Ltd
- Decided: 30 November 2006
- Docket nos.: 251/06
- Citations: [2006] ZASCA 135; 2007 (2) SA 486 (SCA); (2007) 28 ILJ 317 (SCA)

Court membership
- Judges sitting: Howie P, Navsa JA, Nugent JA, Combrinck AJA and Malan AJA

Case opinions
- Decision by: Malan AJA (unanimous)

Keywords
- Agreement in restraint of trade, enforceability of; freedom of trade

In Reddy v Siemens Telecommunications (Pty) Ltd, the Supreme Court of Appeal of South Africa upheld the enforceability of an agreement in restraint of trade. The unanimous judgment was handed down on 30 November 2006 and was written by Acting Judge of Appeal Frans Malan. Per Magna Alloys v Ellis and Basson v Chilwan, Malan tested the reasonableness of the restraint in order to establish its enforceability.

== Background ==
Between 1998 and 2006, Dayandren Reddy was employed by Siemens Telecommunications, a subsidiary of German Siemens AG. As such, he was trained in respect of Siemens products and networks, as well as in respect of the application of software used in the cellular telecommunications industry. He resigned on 26 January 2006 to take up employment as a solutions integrator with Ericsson, one of Siemens's competitors.

However, Reddy's employment contract at Siemens included a written restraint of trade agreed not to disclose Siemens's trade secrets or confidential information and agreed further, in order to protect such proprietary information, not to be employed by any of Siemen's competitors for a period of one year after termination of his employment at Siemens.

Ahead of the beginning of Reddy's contract at Ericsson on 1 March 2006, the High Court of South Africa heard an urgent application to enforce the restraint of trade agreement. Blieden J obliged, and Reddy appealed to the Supreme Court of Appeal, where the matter was heard on 10 November 2006.

== Judgment ==
Acting Judge of Appeal Frans Malan handed down judgment on 30 November 2006 on behalf of a unanimous bench. Malan was guided by the holding in Magna Alloys v Ellis, which had established that a restraint agreement is enforceable unless it is shown to be unreasonable. Moreover, per Basson v Chilwan, the determination of the reasonableness of a restraint rests on balancing the interests of the parties to the restraint: the agreement is unreasonable and unenforceable in cases where "the interest of the party sought to be restrained weighs more than the interest to be protected", because such an agreement is not in the public interest.

Yet in the current case, Siemens had an interest in enforcement that was deserving of protection: the enforcement of the restraint would relieve Siemens of the risk that Reddy would disclose confidential information to Ericsson. This risk of disclosure was obvious and objective and Siemens had an interest in relieving it, regardless of whether it could demonstrate that Reddy would in fact disclose confidential information. In the circumstances, the restraint was neither unreasonable nor contrary to public policy. The appeal was therefore dismissed and Reddy was held to the restraint agreement.

== Significance ==
The judgment was noted for its attempt to show that the common law of restraint of trade is compatible with constitutional values and rights, such as the right to freedom of trade. However, Karin Calitz of Stellenbosch University commented that Malan was "clearly reluctant to find that the South African trade restraint law had been changed by constitutional principles and preferred pacta sunt servanda as the primary value".

== See also ==
- South African labour law
- David Crouch Marketing v Du Plessis
