= Khosa v Minister of Social Development =

South African legal case

- Court: Constitutional Court of South Africa
- Full case name: Khosa and Others v Minister of Social Development and Others; Mahlaule and Another v Minister of Social Development and Others
- Decided: 4 March 2004
- Docket nos.: CCT 12/03; CCT 13/03
- Citations: [2004] ZACC 11; 2004 (6) SA 505 (CC); 2004 (6) BCLR 569 (CC)

Case history
- Appealed from: High Court of South Africa, Transvaal Provincial Division –Khosa and Others v Minister of Social Development and Others (25455/02) and Mahlaule and Others v Minister of Social Development and Others (25453/02)

Court membership
- Judges sitting: Chaskalson CJ, Langa DCJ, Goldstone J, Madala J, Mokgoro J, Moseneke J, Ngcobo J, O'Regan J and Yacoob J

Case opinions
- The Bill of Rights prohibits the exclusion of permanent residents from the social welfare system. Provisions of the Social Assistance Act, 1992 are therefore unconstitutional.
- Decision by: Mokgoro J (Chaskalson, Langa, Goldstone, Moseneke, O’Regan and Yacoob concurring)
- Dissent: Ngcobo J (Madala concurring)

Keywords
- Children's rights; discrimination on the basis of citizenship; rights of permanent residents; right to social assistance; section 9 of the Constitution; section 27 of the Constitution; socio-economic rights; unfair discrimination

Khosa and Others v Minister of Social Development and Others, Mahlaule and Another v Minister of Social Development and Others is a decision of the Constitutional Court of South Africa which established that it is unconstitutional to exclude permanent residents from the social welfare system on the grounds that they lack South African citizenship. The court found that provisions of the Social Assistance Act, 1992 were unconstitutional on that basis.

The matter was decided on 4 March 2004, with the court split seven to two; Justice Yvonne Mokgoro wrote the majority judgement. The holding stemmed primarily from the Constitution's section 27 socioeconomic right to access social security and social assistance, as well as from the section 9 right to freedom from unfair discrimination.

== Background ==
The applicants were five Mozambican citizens, all but one of whom had arrived in Limpopo, South Africa in the 1980s as refugees of the Mozambican Civil War. All five had acquired permanent residency status in South Africa in terms of exemptions granted to eligible Mozambican citizens under the Aliens Control Act, 1991. Each was indigent and would ordinarily be eligible for state-funded social assistance, but each had been denied social grants on the basis that they lacked South African citizenship. The applicants therefore challenged the constitutionality of the Social Assistance Act, 1992 insofar as it reserved certain social grants – old-age grants, child-support grants, and care-dependency grants – for South African citizens. Although the applicants lodged two independent applications in the High Court of South Africa, the matters were heard together because of their similarities.

When the matters came before the Transvaal Provincial Division in March 2003, the respondents (the Minister of Social Development, the Director-General of Social Development and the Member of the Executive Committee for Health and Welfare in the Northern Province) were not present or represented at the hearing. The High Court therefore dealt with the matters as unopposed applications and judged the relevant provisions of the Social Assistance Act to be unconstitutional; those provisions stood to be struck down. The High Court's order of constitutional invalidity was referred for confirmation to the Constitutional Court, where the matter was heard in May 2003 and where the applicants were represented by Paul Kennedy SC and the Legal Resources Centre.

== Majority judgment ==
In a majority judgment written by Justice Yvonne Mokgoro, the Constitutional Court upheld the finding of unconstitutionality, holding that the relevant provisions of the Social Assistance Act were inconsistent with the Bill of Rights. Section 27(1)(c) of the Constitution provides that "Everyone has the right to have access to— social security, including, if they are unable to support themselves and their dependants, appropriate social assistance," and the court held that the word "everyone" should be read literally, entailing that permanent residents were bearers of the right to social security. The court also found that the exclusion of permanent residents from the welfare system constituted unfair discrimination and therefore infringed upon the section 9 right to equality; in this assessment, it relied heavily on the approach of Hoffmann v South African Airways, according to which the unfairness of a discriminatory system must be assessed primarily with reference to the system's impact on the person discriminated against. In this case, the impact of the discriminatory exclusion was also offensive to the human dignity of those excluded.

The court then proceeded to a rights limitations exercise under section 36. The respondents had outlined several reasons for the existing welfare policy, including budgetary constraints and immigration policy considerations, but the court was not persuaded that these factors sufficed to justify the limitation imposed on the section 27(1)(c) right of permanent residents. The Social Assistance Act was therefore inconsistent with the Constitution insofar as it excluded permanent residents from the social welfare system.

However, the Constitutional Court amended the order of the High Court in respect of remedies. Instead of striking down the relevant provisions of the Social Assistance Act, it ordered that permanent residents should be read into the provisions so that access to social grants would be extended instantly to permanent residents, while remaining available to citizens. Importantly, the Constitutional Court also differed from the High Court in considering the situation of permanent residents as distinct from that of other immigrant populations; it did not endorse the High Court's holding that all residents should be included in the social welfare system.

== Minority judgment ==
Justice Sandile Ngcobo filed a dissenting judgment in which Justice Tholie Madala concurred. Ngcobo held that it was constitutional for the state to exclude permanent residents from access to old-age grants, and that such exclusion constituted a justifiable limitation on section 27(1)(c) rights in pursuit of legitimate policy purposes. However, Ngcobo concurred in the majority's order with respect to child-support grants and child-dependency grants: the exclusion could not be justifiable in the case of children, because section 28 of the Constitution enshrined the paramountcy of the best interests of the child.
