= Veltman =

Veltman is a Dutch surname translating as "field man". Notable people with the surname include:

- Alexander Veltman (1800–1870), Russian writer
- Calvin Veltman (born 1941), American sociolinguist
- Daryl Veltman (born 1985), Canadian lacrosse player
- Esther Veltman (born 1966), Dutch cricketer
- Hester Veltman-Kamp (born 1973), Dutch politician
- Jim Veltman (born 1966), Canadian lacrosse player
- Joël Veltman (born 1992), Dutch footballer
- Kim H. Veltman (1948–2020), Dutch/Canadian historian of science
- Marieke Veltman (born 1971), American long jumper and heptathlete
- Martinus J. G. Veltman (1931–2021), Dutch theoretical physicist and Nobel Prize laureate
- Nathaniel Veltman (born 2001), Canadian accused of London, Ontario truck attack
- Pat Veltman (1906–1980), American baseball player
- Steve Veltman (born 1969), American cyclist
- Thierry Veltman (born 1939), Dutch painter, sculptor, and ceramist
- Vera Veltman pseudonym of Vera Panova (1905–1973), Soviet novelist, playwright, and journalist

== See also ==
- 9492 Veltman, main-belt asteroid named after Martinus J. G. Veltman
- Veldman, Dutch surname of the same origin
