= Legal interpretation in South Africa =

Judicial interpretation of laws in South Africa

Legal interpretation in South Africa refers to the juridical understanding of South African legislation and case law, and the rules and principles used to construct its meaning for judicial purposes. Broadly speaking there are three means by which and through which South African scholars and jurists construe their country's statutory law: linguistics or semantics, common law and jurisprudence. Although statutory interpretation usually involves a personal predisposition to the text, the goal is generally to "concretise" it: to harmonise text and purpose. This is the final step in the interpretative process. Statutory interpretation is broadly teleological, comprising as it does first the evaluation and then the application of enacted law.

== Statute law ==
Statute law is written law enacted by a person or a body empowered by the Constitution or other legislation to do so. The Interpretation Act defines it as "any law, proclamation, ordinance, Act of Parliament or other enactment having the force of law." The Constitution of South Africa, which has the force of supreme law, and as such sets the standards and requirements for the construction and construal of statutes, also provides a definition of statute law, distinguishing between national and provincial legislation:

- National legislation:
  - "subordinate legislation made in terms of an Act of Parliament"; and
  - "legislation that was in force when the Constitution took effect and that is administered by the national government."
- Provincial legislation:
  - "subordinate legislation made in terms of a provincial Act"; and
  - "legislation that was in force when the Constitution took effect and that is administered by a provincial government."

There are a large number and variety of statutes in South Africa—including Acts, ordinances, proclamations, by-laws, rules and regulations. As of 1993, statute law is to be found on all three levels of government (national, provincial and local), and as such affects every governmental sphere, and although generally referred to as "public law" may be applicable to any legal area. Statutes derive binding force from their creators or legislators, who are empowered by the Constitution, and serve broadly to regulate the modern state. The Constitution provides a guide on how to read statutes and construe the common law: "When interpreting any legislation, and when developing the common law or customary law, every court, tribunal or forum must promote the spirit, purport and objects of the Bill of Rights." In general, its function is to promote the public interest.

Among the advantages of statute law is that legislation is accessible and therefore broadly "knowable;" that it is dynamic and flexible, and so easily amended; and that it promotes legal certainty, with a formal procedure required for its repeal. Among its disadvantages is that, under a common-law system, legal certainty is frequently an illusion; it often falls to the courts to give "official" meaning. There is also a danger of over-legislating, which can limit the development of a legal system and sometimes even undermine basic principles of fairness and justice, as with the misuse or abuse of legislative power for the ends of social engineering.

=== Classification of legislation ===
==== Chronological ====
===== Pre-1806 =====
The oldest surviving statutes in South Africa are the old colonial Dutch placaaten, which are regarded as common law, and for whose demise no formal procedure is necessary. They are abrogated by disuse.

===== Old-order legislation =====
Old-order legislation is defined in terms of the Constitution as "legislation enacted before the previous Constitution took effect."

====== Pre-Union (1806–1910) ======
Laws enacted prior to the establishment, in 1910, of the Union of South Africa, and after the 1806 British annexation of the Cape, have mostly been repealed or incorporated into other legislation.

====== Between Union and the democratic era (1910–1994) ======
Legislation enacted after 1910, but before the current constitutional dispensation, still forms a substantial—indeed predominant—part of the current body of statute law in South Africa.

===== New-order legislation =====
New-order legislation refers to the whole body statute law enacted in South Africa since 1994. It includes both the Interim Constitution and the current Constitution of 1996, under which all such legislation has been enacted, and with which all legislation must be compatible if it is to be valid.

==== Hierarchy and status ====
Before 1994 and the new era of constitutionalism, it was Parliament rather than the Constitution which enjoyed supremacy. Statutes were divided simply into original legislation (Acts of Parliament) and subordinate legislation (such as regulations and proclamations). Now, however, the Constitution is supreme, and all other legislation subordinate to it. Today legislation is divided according to its status and its position in the hierarchy.

===== Hierarchy =====
"Hierarchy" is classification of legislation according to the level of government (national, provincial or local) whereat it is passed. Statutes which prevail over others are "superior" to them, and superior statutes can be either original or delegated,—see below—even within one level of government. In certain circumstances, however, in certain levels of government, delegated legislation is always subordinate; likewise the Constitution, "not passed by Parliament, but [...] adopted by the Constitutional Assembly," is always supreme, in that any law inconsistent with it is invalid, and in that the obligations it imposes must be fulfilled.

====== Original legislation/Primary Legislation ======
- Parliament is South Africa's highest legislator, its original powers bestowed by the Constitution. Some Acts of Parliament give effect to specific human rights, and are created by specific mandate in the Constitution. These are superior to all other legislation, but subordinate to the Constitution. The Promotion of Access to Information Act, for example, is constitutionally prescribed, and over-rides all other legislation that "is materially inconsistent with an object, or a specific provision, of this Act."
- The original power for new Provincial Acts (those passed since 1994) is derived directly from the Constitution.
- Some provincial ordinances, passed between 1961 and 1986, are still in force. Given that they were enacted by an elected body, could alter the common law and could even have retrospective force, they clearly represent a category of original legislation. A provincial ordinance only applies now in the "old" geographical region of the relevant former province.
- The self-governing former homelands enjoyed concurrent legislative powers in South Africa with the central government, although there were certain limitations on their legislators. Defence and foreign policy, for example, were outside of their legislative competence.
- The legislation of the former TBVC states (Transkei, Bophuthatswana, Venda and Ciskei) is still valid in the applicable areas, as these states have since been re-incorporated into South Africa.
- New municipal legislation or "by-laws", enacted since 1993, derive their original power from the Constitution.

====== Delegated legislation ======
Acts of Parliament and other original legislation are often drafted in skeleton form, as the legislative bodies responsible are not able to account continuously for every change in South African society which such legislation would be required to accommodate. Delegated legislation "adds the flesh;" it is "legislation by administration." An original statute thus "orders" (in an enabling provision) that legislation be drafted, usually at a lower level of government, to address certain aspects of what the original statute is supposed to remedy.

Existing provincial proclamations and regulations (1968–1994) include those issued by the Provincial Councils and, since 1986, the Provincial Administrator, who

- issues proclamations to amend or repeal provincial legislation; and
- issues regulations under and in terms of existing provincial legislation.

New provincial proclamations and regulations (since 1994) are issued to fulfil the requirements of the prescribing Act, to "add flesh" to it.

Other proclamations and regulations may be made or issued by the conferral of delegated powers. A cabinet minister may be authorised to make regulations according to a prescribing statute: for example, section 75 of the National Road Traffic Act, which so empowers the Minister of Transport.

The minister may also empower or authorise another statutory body or person to make such regulations. University councils, for example, and the South African Towing and Recovery Association are so authorised. The Chief Justice, for another example, prescribes the Rules of the Constitutional Court.

== Citation of legislation ==
=== Structure of legislation ===
The use or consideration of the structure of legislation for the purposes of interpretation is known as the systematic or contextual method of statutory interpretation.

==== Long title ====
The long title is a short summary of the content of the statute.

==== Preamble ====
Not every statute has a preamble, but many do. It may be useful in furnishing details of the circumstances, the background and reasons for the creation of the statute.

==== Enacting provision ====
The enacting provision of a statute acknowledges the legislator and authority responsible (be it national, provincial or municipal).

==== Definitions ====
The definitions of terms or words or concepts in the Act are usually included in an "internal dictionary," to be found in the opening section of the Act itself.

==== Purpose and interpretation clauses ====
Purpose and interpretation causes are mostly to be found in new-order legislation. They state the purpose of the Act and prescribe how it ought to be interpreted.

==== Short title and commencement ====
The short title is usually included in the final section. It is the official "name" of the Act. An obvious example would be "Interpretation Act 33 of 1957."

Included in the final section also will usually be an indication of the commencement date of the statute. If no such date is given, it may be found in the relevant gazette.

==== Schedules ====
Schedules provide auxiliary detail and other information additional to the text of the Act, as is the case, for example, in the Constitution, with its seven schedules.

==== Chapters ====
Chapters are normally to be found in longer statutes. They are sometimes also called "parts." They are not usually referred to in citation, however; scholars and judges cite instead the relevant sections and subsections of the Act. The rationale for this is that, while not all statutes have chapters, they are almost always divided into sections. This promotes uniformity.

==== Numbers ====
Examples of a statute number include the Interpretation Act 33 of 1957 and Proclamation R255 of 7 October 1977. Statutes are numbered by the order of their signature or assention by the President, not in order of their publication or enactment.

=== Citation of original legislation ===
National legislation is cited by its short title and number (as above). The same applies to provincial legislation, but with reference to the relevant province: for example, "Eastern Cape Provincial Tender Board Act 2 of 1994." The Constitution is usually cited as "Constitution of the Republic of South Africa, 1996," while the Interim Constitution is cited as "Constitution of the Republic of South Africa Act 200 of 1993."

It is now generally agreed that the final Constitution of 1996 ought, in recognition of its supreme status, not to be cited with its statute number (although it has one).

In the citation "s 2(a)(i)(cc),"

- "2" refers to the section number;
- "(1) refers to the sub-section;
- "(a)" refers to the paragraph;
- "(i)" refers to the sub-paragraph; and
- "(cc)" refers to the item.

"s 2A" would refer to a new section inserted in terms of an amendment.

=== Citation of delegated legislation ===
Delegated legislation usually has no official short title. Regulations issued by GN R999 GG 174254 of 28 June 1996, under s 56 of Aliens Control Act 96 of 1991, for example, would be known broadly as "Aliens control regulations."

==== Proclamations ====
In the citation of proclamations, one should cite the number and the year of promulgation: for example, Proclamation R255 [GG 5766 of 7 October] of 1977. Proclamations are divided into sections, sub-sections and paragraphs.

==== Regulations ====
Regulations are promulgated by Government Notices: for example, GN R1412 of 2003, which issued explosives regulations in terms of the Explosives Act. They are divided into (individual) regulations, sub-regulations and paragraphs.

==== By-laws ====
By-laws are passed by municipal councils. Such councils can also promulgate original legislation, however, because they are representative and deliberative legislative bodies.

In Fedsure v Greater Johannesburg, the court held that, although the detailed powers and functions of local governments have to be determined by the laws of a competent authority, this does not mean that the powers they exercise are "delegated." Nor does it prevent those powers from being regarded as "original" and not "delegated."

By-laws are divided into sections, sub-sections and paragraphs.

==== Rules ====
Examples of rules include the Uniform Rules of the High Court and the Magistrates' Court Rules. These are divided into (individual) rules, sub-rules and paragraphs.

== Influence of the Bill of Rights ==
Section 39(2) of the Constitution of South Africa provides that, "When interpreting any legislation... every court, tribunal or forum must promote the spirit, purport and objects of the Bill of Rights." Section 39(2) has far-reaching implications for statutory interpretation, especially in the context of constitutional litigation. Per Investigating Directorate: Serious Economic Offences v Hyundai Motors, "all statutes must be interpreted through the prism of the Bill of Rights" in the "spirit of transition and transformation [that] characterises the constitutional enterprise as a whole".

One consequence of this approach is that, in any case where more than one interpretation of a statutory provision is possible, the court must prefer the interpretation that "best" promotes the Bill of Rights, even if none of the available interpretations would render the provision unconstitutional. In particular, in disputes about the constitutionality of a statute, section 39(2) has been taken to mandate a method of statutory interpretation known as "reading down". Under this method, the court investigates whether a given statutory provision is "reasonably capable" of an interpretation under which the provision is constitutionally compliant and does not limit constitutional rights. If such an interpretation is available, the court is required to prefer it. This exercise – of awarding preference to constitutionally compliant interpretations – was explicitly set out in section 35(2) of the Interim Constitution. Though the same requirement does not appear in the Constitution of 1996, it remains a requirement of constitutional law; as Justice Laurie Ackermann held in De Lange v Smuts, the method of "reading down" simply expresses "a sound principle of constitutional interpretation" with broad acceptance in other constitutional democracies.

The authoritative statement of the "reading down" method is Justice Sandile Ngcobo's judgment in Investigating Directorate (in which the court "read down" a provision of the National Prosecuting Authority Act to interpret the word "suspicion" as meaning "reasonable suspicion"). In that judgment, the Constitutional Court noted that the method is bounded by the requirement that the ultimate interpretation should be reasonable and not "unduly strained". Indeed, shortly before Investigating Directorate was handed down, the court had concluded in National Coalition for Gay and Lesbian Equality v Minister of Home Affairs that the wording of another provision (section 25(5) of the Aliens Control Control Act, 1996) did not accommodate a constitutionally compliant "reading down". Another prominent case involving the method, decided during the same period, was Daniels v Campbell.

Under the principle of avoidance, a court will generally attempt to interpret legislation in conformity with the Bill of Rights before considering the direct application of the Bill of Rights. If an impugned provision can be read down as constitutional, the challenge to its constitutionality must fail, as it is consistent with the Constitution. On the other hand, if the only plausible interpretation of a statutory provision is one that entails an infringement of the Bill of Rights, then the court must proceed to apply the Bill of Rights directly to ascertain whether the infringement is justifiable. This sequence was summarised in Govender v Minister of Safety and Security, where the Supreme Court of Appeal set out a five-part formula for resolving constitutional challenges to legislation. In the first three steps, the judicial officer must examine the objects and purport of the statute under consideration; examine the ambit and meaning of the rights protected by the Constitution; and ascertain whether it is reasonably possible to interpret the statute in such a manner that it conforms to the Constitution (by protecting the rights protected therein). At that juncture, if such an interpretation is possible, the judicial officer must give effect to it; if it is not possible, he initiates steps leading to a declaration of constitutional invalidity.

== See also ==
- Statutory interpretation
- Constitutionalism
