= Zealand v Minister of Justice =

South African legal case

Zealand v Minister of Justice is an important case in South African constitutional law.

== Facts ==
In January 1997, the applicant was charged with crimes which included rape and murder. The matter was postponed. While he was remanded in custody, he escaped. He was re-arrested some three months later and then charged with escaping from custody. He was convicted and sentenced to six months' imprisonment wholly suspended, but remained in prison as an awaiting-trial-prisoner.

In September 1998 he was charged with a second murder, for which he was convicted and sentenced to eighteen years' imprisonment. His appeal against the second murder, in August 1999, was successful, but the Registrar of the High Court negligently failed to issue a warrant for the applicant's release. He remained in a maximum-security prison until December 2004, over five years later.

Throughout the years of his detention, his first murder case had been repeatedly postponed. In addition, the record showed that, on October 11, 2001, a magistrate had ordered that his case be postponed, and that he be released on warning. The record did not show why this was not done.

He sued the Ministers of Correctional Services and Justice, the respondents, for damages arising from unlawful detention.

In their defence the respondents admitted negligence but contended that, if the applicant had been released from maximum-security prison he would immediately have been transferred to a medium-security prison as an awaiting-trial prisoner.

== High Court ==
The High Court found that his entire detention had been unlawful.

== Supreme Court of Appeal ==
When the Ministers appealed, the Supreme Court of Appeal found that only the detention since 11 October 2001 had been unlawful.

== Constitutional Court ==
=== Leave to appeal ===
The court held that the question of whether the applicant's detention was consistent with the principle of legality and his right to freedom and security of the person in section 12(1) of the Constitution of the Republic of South Africa, 1996, was a constitutional matter. "In light of the view I take of the matter," wrote Langa CJ, "the application for leave to appeal should be granted."

=== Merits ===
The legal issue before the Constitutional Court in this application to appeal to it (to have the whole five years declared unlawful) was whether it is lawful to detain a person as if he were a convicted prisoner where

- the ostensible basis for his detention is absent because a court of law has upheld his appeal; but
- he is awaiting trial on other charges.

The court held that section 12(1)(a) of the Constitution enshrines the right not to be deprived of freedom arbitrarily or without just cause.

The respondents bore the burden of justifying the applicant's deprivation of liberty. The applicant had been "deprived of liberty" because, inter alia,

- the difference between the two prison sections was of great significance; and
- the one was for awaiting-trial prisoners who are presumed innocent while the other was for those who were being punished.

Respect for human dignity demanded that this difference be recognised. This obligation, the court observed, is entrenched in article 10(2) of the International Covenant on Civil and Political Rights, and in sections 82 and 83 of the Correctional Services Act 8 of 1959, as well as Correctional Services Act 111 of 1998.

The court held that the deprivation had been "arbitrary and without just cause." Detention in maximum security had not been for any considered reason; it was due to negligence, and was therefore unlawful. The fact that a series of magistrates had ordered it was not sufficient to negate this finding.

=== Damages ===
Having found that his detention for the entire period was unlawful, in the sense that section 12(1)(a) of the Constitution was unjustifiably and unreasonably violated, the question now arose: Was that sufficient, in this case, to justify a finding that the applicant's detention was also unlawful or wrongful in the sense required by the private law delictual action of unlawful or wrongful detention?

In Rail Commuters Action Group and Others v Transnet Ltd t/a Metrorail and Others, the Constitutional Court had considered the relationship between violations of constitutional rights in public law and delictual claims against the State in private law, and had unanimously held, on the one hand, that "private law damages claims are not always the most appropriate method to enforce constitutional rights." It had held, further, that "it should also be emphasised that a public law obligation does not automatically give rise to a legal duty for the purposes of the law of delict." On the other hand, the court also held that it "should not be understood to suggest that delictual relief should not lie for the infringement of constitutional rights in appropriate circumstances. There will be circumstances where delictual relief is appropriate."

Accordingly, the court had held in Rail Commuters that, when determining whether an action lies in the private law of delict when a public-law duty has been breached, the constitutional norm of accountability should be considered. Furthermore, careful analysis of the relevant constitutional provisions, any relevant statutory duties and the relevant context would be required. It would be necessary, too, to take account of other constitutional norms, important and relevant ones being the principle of effectiveness and the need to be responsive to people's needs.

Having considered Rail Commuters, Langa found that Zealand was

not an appropriate case to traverse fully the complex relationship between public law duties and private law remedies. Suffice it to say the following. I can think of no reason why an unjustifiable breach of s 12(1)(a) of the Constitution should not be sufficient to establish unlawfulness for the purposes of the applicant's delictual action of unlawful or wrongful detention.

Moreover, he noted, South Africa also bears an international obligation in this regard, in terms of article 9(5) of the International Covenant on Civil and Political Rights, which provides that "anyone who has been the victim of unlawful arrest or detention shall have an enforceable right to compensation."

The breach of section 12(1)(a) was therefore sufficient, in the circumstances of this case, to render the applicant's detention unlawful for the purposes of a delictual claim for damages. "That," wrote Langa, "will be the most effective way to vindicate the applicant's constitutional right. I expect that to be the case in most instances of unlawful detention." The order made by the Supreme Court of Appeal was accordingly set aside.
