= Magna Alloys v Ellis =

Case in South African law

Magna Alloys & Research (S.A.) (Pty) Ltd. v Ellis is an important case in South African law, particularly contract. It established the principle that a restraint of trade is enforceable unless the court is convinced that it is unreasonable.

the leading case on restraint of trade is Magna Alloys and Research ( SA) (PTY) Ltd Vs Ellis 1984 (4) 874 ( A). The Law on agreements in restraint of trade has changed as a result of this decision. Prior to the Magna Alloys case, South African courts have accepted that an agreement in restraint of trade is contrary to public policy and therefore void, unless it can be shown that the restraint is reasonable. The Magna Alloys case changed the law and has settled the divisions of opinion on the issue of the restraint of trade. by Regina Burger, Otjiwarongo, Namibia - Africa

== See also ==
- South African contract law
