= FNB v Commissioner for the South African Revenue Services =

South African legal case

- Court: Constitutional Court of South Africa
- Full case name: First National Bank of SA Limited t/a Wesbank v Commissioner for the South African Revenue Services and Another; First National Bank of SA Limited t/a Wesbank v Minister of Finance
- Decided: 16 May 2002; 24 years ago
- Docket nos.: CCT 19/01
- Citations: [2002] ZACC 5; 2002 (4) SA 768; 2002 (7) BCLR 702

Case history
- Appealed from: High Court of South Africa, Cape Provincial Division – First National Bank of SA Limited t/a Wesbank v Commissioner for the South African Revenue Service and Another 2001 (3) SA 310 (C); 2001 (7) BCLR 715 (C)

Court membership
- Judges sitting: Chaskalson CJ, Langa DCJ, Ackermann, Kriegler, Madala, Mokgoro, O'Regan, Sachs and Yacoob JJ, Du Plessis and Skweyiya AJJ

Case opinions
- Decision by: Ackermann (unanimous)

First National Bank of SA Limited v Commissioner for the South African Revenue Services and Another; First National Bank of SA LImited v Minister of Finance is an important decision in South African property law, handed down by the Constitutional Court of South Africa on 16 May 2002.

The court held unanimously that section 114 of the Customs and Excise Act, 1964 was constitutionally invalid to the extent that it provided that a third party's property could be subject to lien and seizure for another person's customs debt. The matter was heard on appeal from the Cape High Court on 28 August 2001 and Justice Laurie Ackermann wrote the court's judgment.

In 1996 and 1997, acting in terms of section 114 of the Customs and Excise Act, the Commissioner of the South African Revenue Service detained three vehicles belonging to First National Bank of South Africa (trading as WesBank), intending to sell the vehicles to recover unpaid customs duties and penalties owed not by the bank but certain importers who had leased the vehicles.

The bank contended successfully that this constituted an arbitrary deprivation of its property in violation of the property rights protected by section 25(1) of the Constitution of South Africa. In evaluating this argument, Ackermann set out a test for determining whether deprivation of property has taken place, though it is debatable to what extent the court adhered to that test in subsequent cases.
