= Veldman v DPP, Witwatersrand =

South African criminal case

In Veldman v Director of Public Prosecutions, Witwatersrand Local Division, an important case in South African criminal law, the court held that the principle of legality is central to the rule of law under the Constitution. That case concerned the question of whether, where the sentencing jurisdiction of a court had been increased after an accused had pleaded, the accused could be sentenced in terms of the increased jurisdiction. The court held it could not, observing that, once an accused has pleaded, the constitutionally-enshrined principle of legality requires that the sentencing jurisdiction of a court could not be varied to the detriment of the accused, even where it was clear that the increased sentence was a permissible sentence for the charge involved. The court held that "to retrospectively apply a new law, such as s 92(1) (a), during the course of the trial, and thereby to expose an accused person to a more severe sentence, undermines the rule of law and violates an accused person's right to a fair trial under s 35(3) of the Constitution."

== See also ==
- South African criminal law
