= Minister of Justice and Constitutional Development v Prince =

2018 South African legal case

Minister of Justice and Constitutional Development and Others v Prince
- Court: Constitutional Court of South Africa
- Full case name: Minister of Justice and Constitutional Development and Others v Prince (Clarke and Others Intervening); National Director of Public Prosecutions and Others v Rubin; National Director of Public Prosecutions and Others v Acton and Others
- Decided: 18 September 2018
- Citation: [2018] ZACC 30

Case history
- Prior actions: Prince v Minister of Justice and Constitutional Development, [2017] ZAWCHC 30
- Appealed from: Western Cape Division of the High Court

Court membership
- Judges sitting: Zondo ACJ, Cameron J, Froneman J, Jafta J, Kathree-Setiloane AJ, Kollapen AJ, Madlanga J, Mhlantla J, Theron J, Zondi AJ

Case opinions
- Decision by: Zondo (unanimous)

Minister of Justice and Constitutional Development v Prince is a decision of the Constitutional Court of South Africa delivered on 18 September 2018, which found that it is unconstitutional for the state to criminalize the possession, use or cultivation of cannabis by adults for personal consumption in private.

The court gave Parliament 24 months to amend the affected legislation, but also granted interim relief which had the effect of immediately making it legal for adults to use cannabis in private, possess cannabis in private for personal use, and cultivate cannabis in a private place for personal consumption.

The Cannabis for Private Purposes Bill, approved in 2024, was the result from that process.

== See also ==
- Cannabis in South Africa
- Dagga Couple
- Legalisation of cannabis / Legalization of illegal drugs
- Drug policy
