= Investigating Directorate: SEO v Hyundai Motors =

South African legal case

- Court: Constitutional Court of South Africa
- Full case name: Investigating Directorate: Serious Economic Offences and Others v Hyundai Motor Distributors (Pty) Ltd and Others, in re: Hyundai Motor Distributors (Pty) Ltd and Others v Smit NO and Others
- Decided: 25 August 2000
- Citations: [2000] ZACC 12, 2000 (10) BCLR 1079 (CC), 2001 (1) SA 545 (CC)

Case history
- Appealed from: Transvaal Provincial Division

Court membership
- Judges sitting: Chaskalson P, Langa DP, Goldstone, Kriegler, Madala, Mokgoro, Ngcobo, O'Regan, Sachs & Yacoob JJ, Cameron AJ

Case opinions
- Decision by: Langa

Investigating Directorate: Serious Economic Offences and Others v Hyundai Motor Distributors (Pty) Ltd and Others; In Re Hyundai Motor Distributors (Pty) Ltd and Others v Smit NO and Others, an important case in South African law, was heard in the Constitutional Court on March 16, 2000, with judgment handed down on August 25. Chaskalson P, Langa DP, Goldstone J, Kriegler J, Madala J, Mokgoro J, Ngcobo J, O'Regan J, Sachs J, Yacoob J and Cameron AJ were the judges.

== Facts ==
A search warrant had been issued in terms of section 29 of the National Prosecuting Authority Act in respect of certain premises. A large quantity of documents, records and data was seized from those premises. The respondents applied to a High Court for an order declaring, inter alia, sections 28(13), 28(14) and 29(5) of that Act to be inconsistent with the Constitution. The High Court granted the order to the extent that those sections authorised the search and seizure of property where there were no reasonable grounds for suspecting that a specified offence had been committed.

== Judgment ==
In an application for the confirmation of the order and an appeal to the Constitutional Court against that order, the court held that the right to privacy, as guaranteed in the Constitution, did not relate solely to the individual within his or her intimate space. When persons moved beyond this established "intimate core," they still retained a right to privacy in the social capacities in which they acted. Thus, when people were in their offices, in their cars or on mobile telephones, they still retained a right to be left alone by the State unless certain conditions were satisfied. The right to privacy would come into play when a person had the ability to decide what to disclose to the public and when the decision was reasonable.

The court held, further, that juristic persons enjoyed the right to privacy, although not to the same extent as natural persons. The level of justification for any particular limitation of the right would have to be judged in the light of the circumstances of each case. Relevant circumstances would have included whether the subject of the limitation was a natural or a juristic person, as well as the nature and effect of the invasion of privacy.

Although judicial officers had to prefer interpretations of legislation that fell within constitutional bounds over those that did not, provided that such an interpretation could be reasonably ascribed to the provision, limits had to be placed on the application of that principle. On the one hand, it was the duty of a judicial officer to interpret legislation in conformity with the Constitution insofar as this was reasonably possible; on the other hand, the legislature was under a duty to pass legislation that was reasonably clear and precise, enabling citizens and officials to understand what was expected of them. A balance would often have to be struck as to how this tension was to be resolved when considering the constitutionality of legislation. There would be occasions when a judicial officer would find that the legislation, although open to a meaning which would be unconstitutional, was reasonably capable of being read in conformity with the Constitution. Such an interpretation should not, however, be unduly strained. Where a legislative provision was reasonably capable of a meaning that placed it within constitutional bounds, it should be preserved. Only if this was not possible should resort be had to the remedy of reading in or notional severance.

A preparatory investigation in terms of s 28(13) was a procedure that was available to an investigating director who had insufficient grounds or information to form a reasonable suspicion that a specified offence had been committed: A mere suspicion could have triggered a preparatory investigation in terms of s 28(13), provided the purpose was to enable the investigating director to decide whether or not there were in fact reasonable grounds for a suspicion that a specified offence had been or was being committed. The court found that the investigating directorate was a special unit established under the Act to conduct investigations into serious and complex offences. If it had been unable to commence investigations until it had a reasonable suspicion that a specified offence had been committed, initial investigations, which may have been sensitive and crucial, would have been beyond its jurisdiction. The provisions of the Act authorising the investigating directorate to engage in preparatory investigations served the purpose of enabling the investigating directorate to be involved in sensitive investigations from an early stage. The purpose, therefore, was to assist the investigating director in crossing the threshold from a mere suspicion that a specified offence had been committed to a reasonable suspicion, which was a prerequisite for the holding of an inquiry. A suspicion, short of a reasonable suspicion that a specified offence had been committed, could have arisen either because there was uncertainty as to whether an offence had been committed, or because there was uncertainty that an offence in respect of which there was reasonable suspicion was in fact a specified offence.

The court held, further, that it was also implicit in the legislation that the judicial officer should have had regard to the provisions of the Constitution in making the decision. The Act quite clearly exhibited a concern for the constitutional rights of persons subjected to the search and seizure provisions. That was the apparent reason for the requirement in sections 29(4) and (5) that a search and seizure be carried out only if sanctioned by a warrant issued by a judicial officer. In the light of the law of criminal procedure, the legislative history and the specific provisions of section 29(2) of the Act, the legislature had to be taken to have contemplated that a judicial officer would not have exercised a discretion to issue a warrant if that would have resulted in an impermissible violation of the right to privacy of the persons to be searched.

A search warrant could properly be obtained, on the basis of a reasonable suspicion that an offence had been committed, provided that it was considered that further evidence might establish that such an offence was a specified offence. Before authorising the warrant, the judicial officer would have to apply his or her mind to the matters set out in section 29(5) in evaluating the information put before him or her. A warrant would be issued only if it appeared to the judicial officer that there were reasonable grounds for the suspicion that an object connected with the commission of an offence, which might be a specified offence, was on the targeted premises.

The court found that there was no doubt that search and seizure provisions, in the context of a preparatory investigation, served an important purpose in the fight against crime. That the State had a pressing interest which involved the security and freedom of the community as a whole was beyond question. It was an objective which was sufficiently important to justify the limitation of the right to privacy of an individual in certain circumstances. The right was not meant to shield criminal activity or to conceal evidence of crime from the criminal justice process. On the other hand, State officials were not entitled without good cause to invade the premises of persons for purposes of searching and seizing property; there would otherwise be little content left to the right to privacy. A balance therefore had to be struck between the interests of the individual and that of the State, a task that lay at the heart of the inquiry into the limitation of rights.

Section 29(5), the court found, was capable of an interpretation that was consistent with the Constitution. The proper interpretation of s 29(5) permitted a judicial officer to issue a search warrant in respect of a preparatory investigation only when he or she was satisfied that there existed a reasonable suspicion that an offence which might be a specified offence had been committed. The warrant could be issued only where the judicial officer had concluded

- that there was a reasonable suspicion that such an offence had been committed;
- that there were reasonable grounds for believing that objects connected with an investigation into that suspected offence could be found on the relevant premises; and
- that, in the exercise of his or her discretion, the judicial officer considered it appropriate to issue a search warrant.

These, the court held, were considerable safeguards protecting the right to privacy of individuals. The scope of the limitation of the right to privacy was therefore narrow.

The order in the Transvaal Provincial Division in Hyundai Motor Distributors (Pty) Ltd and Others v Smit NO and Others declaring sections 28(13), 28(14) and 29(5) of the National Prosecuting Authority Act 32 of 1998 to be inconsistent with the Constitution was thus not confirmed.
