= Carmichele v Minister of Safety and Security =

South African legal case

The Constitutional Court, in Carmichele v Minister of Safety and Security and Another (Centre for Applied Legal Studies Intervening), an important case in South African criminal, delict and constitutional law, found that the State could be held delictually liable for damages arising out of the unlawful omissions of its servants. In casu, the conduct of the police and a prosecutor had resulted in the release of a person, charged with rape, on his own recognisance. This person had subsequently assaulted the complainant.

CR Snyman, for one, has noted the court's emphasis on section 39(2) of the Constitution, which provides that "every court [...] must promote the spirit, purport and objects of the Bill of Rights." This, he argues, "may perhaps one day open the way for holding an individual police officer liable for a crime such as culpable homicide flowing from her negligent omission to protect a person from the real possibility of harm."

== See also ==
- South African criminal law
- South African law of delict
