= South African collective labour law =

Law governing collective bargaining, trade unions and industrial action in South Africa

Collective labour law in South Africa is the part of labour law that governs the relationship between employers and employees acting collectively, through trade unions and employers' organisations. Where individual labour law deals with the rights of employees, collective labour law deals with "interest issues": the creation and change of terms and conditions of employment through collective bargaining between the parties, rather than through legislation or the courts. It also regulates the registration of unions and employers' organisations, their organisational rights, and the use of strikes and lock-outs as means of pressure in bargaining.

The field is governed principally by the Constitution and the Labour Relations Act 1995 (LRA). Section 23 of the Constitution protects the right to fair labour practices, the right to form and join a trade union, the right to strike, and the right to engage in collective bargaining, and it permits legislation recognising union security arrangements such as closed-shop and agency-shop agreements. The LRA gives effect to these rights by creating bargaining councils and statutory councils, protecting freedom of association, and setting out when a strike or lock-out is protected. It excludes members of the South African National Defence Force, the National Intelligence Agency and the South African Secret Service. The modern framework replaced a racially divided system that began with the Industrial Conciliation Act 1924, which provided for the registration of white trade unions, and that was partly deracialised after the Wiehahn Commission of 1977.

== Overview ==
The power play between employers and employees is clearly in evidence in the engagement of employer and employee through collective labour law. The LRA, together with other labour legislation, lays down basic rights and duties and remedies for ensuring fairness in the employment relationship. These are matters relating to the rights of employees and are accordingly known as "rights issues." When it comes to creating new terms and conditions of employment—these are known as "interest issues" or "matters of mutual interest"—or to changing existing terms, no legislation exists which explicitly regulates the situation. These issues, it is assumed, are better dealt with by the parties themselves. A court may not, for example, determine an annual increase for employees, or decide whether or not a crèche facility at the workplace is mandatory, or whether employees should be permitted to take Friday afternoons off. The reason for this is that "it is impossible to regulate these matters of mutual interest." This is where collective bargaining comes into the picture.

The LRA recognizes the importance of collective bargaining and supports the mechanism:

If collective bargaining can be compared to a boxing match, the LRA can be seen as the organiser of the boxing match and the employers and trade unions are the boxers on opposite sides. The LRA provides the basic rules to protect the boxers both inside and outside the boxing ring. This is done, for example, by protecting the right of employees to form and join trade unions and to participate in their activities. This applies equally to employers who can form employers' organisations.

Section 213 of the LRA defines a trade union as “an association of employees whose principal purpose is to regulate relations between employees and employers, including any employers’ organisation.” An employer organisation is defined as “any number of employers associated together for the purpose, whether by itself or with other purposes, of regulating relations between employers and employees or trade unions.”

The LRA regulates the registration of trade unions and employers' organisations. It creates bargaining fora, such as bargaining councils and statutory councils, and guarantees the right to freedom of association. It also regulates organisational rights and strikes and lock-outs.

Once workers are organised in a registered trade union, and employers in an employers' organisation, the power play between workers and employers begins. Employees may try to force the employer's hand by way of strike action, while the employer ma exert pressure on the employees by way of a lock-out. It is accepted that strike action will result in a certain measure of economic handship for the employer. Provided that the strike has obtained protected status in terms of the law—in other words, is not prohibited, and the prescribed procedures have been followed—such economic hardship is considered to be part and parcel of the power struggle between employees and their employers: "In fact, this is the whole idea!" The more the employer is hurt economically, the greater the chance that the strikers' demands will be met.

It is important to know when a strike or lock-out is protected, and when it is not, because that will determine the course of action and remedies for employers in the case of a strike, and for employees in the case of a lock-out.

== History ==
=== Industrial Conciliation Act (1924) ===
Between 1911 and 1918, a succession of laws was promulgated in South Africa which dealt with various industrial sectors, and with labour in general. Only in the aftermath of large-scale industrial unrest on the Witwatersrand in 1922, however, was any comprehensive attempt undertaken to regulate relations between management and organised labour. The tumult on the Rand led directly to the first comprehensive piece of labour legislation, the Industrial Conciliation Act 1924, which was also the first legislation to regulate strikes in the country. It also recognised and regulated lock-outs. The Act provided for the registration of white trade unions and employers’ organisations, "self-evidently also white," and established a framework for collective bargaining through industrial councils or conciliation boards, as well as a dispute settlement system. Although the Act was "largely voluntarist," compliance with its provisions and with collective agreements was enforced by criminal sanction. The 1924 Act resulted in greater wage disparity between different racial groups. The Industrial Conciliation Act dealt only with collective labour rights; individual rights were dealt with in a Wage Act in 1925.

=== Wiehahn Commission ===
This dualistic system of labour relations—one for blacks and the other for whites, "coloureds" and Indians (although the latter groups were also discriminated against)—lasted until the beginning of the 1980s. In 1977, the government appointed the Commission of Enquiry into Labour Legislation, commonly known as the Wiehahn Commission that made significant recommendations for change, which changed the face of collective bargaining in South Africa. It was tasked to examine the current legislation and make recommendations to maintain the peace in the labour system. The Commission produced a six-part report, the primary recommendations of which were:

- that full trade union rights be accorded black workers;
- that job reservation be scrapped;
- that a Manpower Commission be established; and
- that the Industrial Court replace the existing Industrial Tribunal and be given extended powers.

In an attempt to give effect to these recommendations, significant amendments were made to the Industrial Conciliation Act (renamed the Labour Relations Act 28 of 1956), which with further amendments formed the legislative structure for regulating collective labour relations for the next 15 years.

The country's labour laws were thus largely "deracialised." All African workers who were not migrant workers could now join trade unions. The National Manpower Commission, a statutory body comprising representatives from employers organisations, trades and the State, which would meet to discuss economic and industrial policy, was duly established.

In recognition of the fact dispute-resolution mechanisms, thitherto inadequate, needed to be bolstered, the Industrial Court (predecessor of the present-day Labour Court) was duly established, too. The Industrial Court was largely hands-off in respect of collective bargaining, in which it did not think it had any place involving itself here.

The last change to be implemented as a result of the commission's findings was the removal of race-based job reservation, which was seen as having contributed to the unrest. These changes led to a tremendous growth in the trade union movement, which proved instrumental, especially in the 1980s, in the struggle against apartheid.

=== Labour Relations Act (1995) ===
The system in place up to the advent of democracy, "when South Africa was shaken to the roots by the transformation of the apartheid regime into a fully democratic constitutional order," was very fragmented. There were numerous definitional problems, too. Given the prominent role played by trade unions in bringing down apartheid, and given "the rapid and large-scale movement of former union leaders and cadres into party politics and government, it is hardly surprising that much attention was given to labour rights m the new dispensation."

The right to fair labour practices, the right to bargain collectively and the right to strike were entrenched with a number of other fundamental rights in a new interim Constitution that came into force in 1993. Those rights remained entrenched in the final Constitution, adopted by the new democratic parliament on 8 May 1996. At that point, although all parties agreed that these fundamental labour rights should be given constitutional status (although there was some dispute about the extent of an employer's right to lock out), there was room for disagreement on the scope and content of those rights. The final Constitution provided that "national legislation may be enacted to regulate collective bargaining."

"From this cue," writes John Grogan, "the government set about preparing legislation to give flesh to the bones of the constitutional guarantees." The first step was to appoint a commission, under the chairmanship of Professor Halton Cheadle, to produce a draft Labour Relations Amendment Bill. This was accomplished six months later. The draft formed the basis of the new Labour Relations Act 66 of 1995, which appeared in its current form after "intensive debate" in the National Economic Development & Labour Council (NEDLAC), a body consisting of representatives of government, organised labour, and employers, including the Manpower Commission and the National Economic Forum. They started thrashing out a new framework, to deal comprehensively with both individual and collective labour law. Given the adversarial nature of the relationship between organised labour and employers up to that point,

this was a revolutionary development. Under the watchful eye of government representatives, and with their participation, management and labour were entrusted with the task of developing the draft bill into a uniquely South African product that at once satisfied the aspirations of labour and the reservations of management, and yet conformed to the letter and spirit of the Constitution and the requirements of the International Labour Organization (ILO), of which South Africa was now a member.

This produced the current LRA, "yet another turning point." One of the hopes of the drafters was to change the adversarial stance which tended to be adopted by unions and management under the old dispensation to a more co-operative one. The LRA created new institutions for encouraging union-management cooperation, and revamped old ones, "in the hope this would help transform and mature attitudes and bargaining styles."

== Sources ==
=== Common law ===
The common law of South Africa, "an amalgam of principles drawn from Roman, Roman-Dutch, English and other jurisdictions, which were accepted and applied by the courts in colonial times and during the period that followed British rule after Union in 1910," plays virtually no role in collective labour law. Initially, in fact, employment law, or "the law of master and servant," was regarded as a branch of the law of lease. As such, the common law did not concern itself directly with collective bargaining; its focus instead was on the rights and duties of individual employees and employers, as reflected in the contract on which their relationship was based. The law did not recognize claims by employees which had not been conferred by agreement. Although the role of the common law is minimal, therefore, the common-law contractual relationship between employer and employee underpins collective labour law in general and collective bargaining in particular.

=== Constitution ===
Legislation therefore is pivotal. The Constitution, however, is more pivotal still. Section 23 enshrines the right to "fair labour practices," while section 18 provides that "everyone has the right to freedom of association." The right to strike, furthermore, has been explicitly constitutionalized. The Constitution also provides not only for the right of every worker "to form and join a trade union," but also for the right of every trade union "to form and join a federation," like COSATU. Similar rights are granted to employers and employers’ associations as well. The right to collective bargaining is constitutionalized, with a mandate for national legislation to regulate it. More controversially, the Constitution also provides that "national legislation may recognize union security arrangements contained in collective agreements."

=== Labour Relations Act ===
Collective bargaining is one of the ways in which the LRA gives effect to section 23 of the Constitution. It is also an important part of freedom of association. Among the first of the LRA's aspirations, listed in the Preamble, is "to regulate the organisational rights of trade unions." A trade union without organisational rights is not much of a trade union. Organisational rights allow the trade union to access the workplace, etc.

The Preamble also describes as a purpose of the LRA the promotion of collective bargaining, and the regulation of the rights to strike and to lock out. It seeks also to advance "the democratization of the workplace" by involving employees in decision-making through workplace forums, although these have not proliferated.

The LRA defines as an "employee" any person (excluding an independent contractor) who

- works for another person or the State;
- is entitled to receive remuneration for such work; and
- assists in conduct of the business.

"Trade union" is defined in the LRA as an association strictly of employees, whose principal purpose is to regulate relations between employees and employers. The trade union must act in the interests of its members. Trade unions also support individual members with individual disputes. A trade union must have an address in South Africa, and its name must not be so similar to that of another union "that it is likely to mislead or cause confusion." Other requirements are set out in section 95.

Excluded from the application of the LRA are the members of

- the National Defense Force;
- the National Intelligence Agency; and
- the South African Secret Service.

== Freedom of association ==
Freedom of association, "one of the cornerstones of liberal democracy," is also one of the basic principles of labour law, reflected in several ILO Conventions, in the LRA and in the Constitution. Freedom of association "stems from a basic human need for society, community, and shared purpose in a freely chosen enterprise [...] protecting individuals from the vulnerability of isolation and ensuring the potential of effective participation in a society." In short, people have the right to associate with others in order to defend and protect their common interests. This constitutes "both an individual and a collective human right." In addressing the individual facet of freedom of association, the Supreme Court of Canada, in Lavigne v Ontario recognized that "the essence of freedom of association is the protection of the individual interests in self-actualization and fulfillment that can be realized only through combination with others."

"However," writes Mpfariseni Budeli,

freedom of association is important not only to facilitate effective participation in civil and political society. It is equally important in the field of social and economic activity and is particularly significant as a basis for securing trade union freedom from interference by the employer on the one hand and the government on the other.

Freedom of association in the workplace may be defined as "those legal and moral rights of workers to form unions, to join unions of their choice and to demand that their unions function independently." It also includes the right of workers to participate in these unions’ lawful activities. "Freedom of association must therefore be seen," according to Budeli, "as the foundation of the collective bargaining process," which contributes to ensuring fairness and equity in labour matters, and to facilitating orderly and stable industrial relations.

Freedom of association is the foundation of the collective-bargaining process. Before a group or collective may engage in collective bargaining, it is necessary that legal protection be extended to that group or collective. Legal measures are also necessary to protect the rights of people to belong to a group or collective. This is what freedom of association is all about: the legal protection of the freedom of persons to join a collective entity. The law, therefore, both permits people to join trade unions, and also protects their right to do so.

The ILO Committee of Experts has provided "what can be regarded as the correct approach concerning freedom of association and social policy." In the committee's view, freedom of association should be guaranteed in such a way as to allow trade unions to express their aspirations, and so as to provide an indispensable contribution to economic development and social progress.

The Constitution grants a general right to freedom of association to "everyone," as well as explicitly and specifically to trade unions. Section 23 of the Constitution protects the right of employees to form and join a trade union and to participate in the activities and programmes of that union. Freedom of association does not apply only to employees, however; the employer's freedom of association is protected, too: Section 23 also protects the right of employers to form and join employers’ organisations, and to participate in the activities and programmes of such organisations.

Both trade unions and employers' organisations have the right

- to determine their own administration programs and activities;
- "to organize; and
- "to form and join a federation."

Finally,

every trade union, employers’ organisation and employer has the right to engage in collective bargaining. National legislation may be enacted to regulate collective bargaining. To the extent that the legislation may limit a right in this chapter the limitation must comply with section 36(1).

While the Constitution lays emphasis on the importance of freedom of association, the LRA emphasizes, protects and gives concrete content to this foundational right. The LRA recognizes the right of trade unions to organize themselves. Membership of a trade union is subject to the constitution of the trade union. This means that a union may determine, in its constitution, what types of employees may become members of the union, and what types of employees are disqualified from membership. Unless an employee qualifies for membership in terms of the union's constitution, he is ineligible for membership. This principle has its limits. A trade union which attempts, through its constitution, to limit its members to persons of a certain race or sex could find such a provision ruled invalid; "it would certainly not be registered in terms of the LRA."

Section 4 does not only protect the right to join and form a union. It also grants members of a union the right to participate in the affairs of the union. As a member of a trade union, an employee has the following rights:

- to participate in the union's lawful activities;
- to participate in the election of any of the union's office-bearers, officials or trade-union representatives;
- to stand for election, and be eligible for appointment, as an office-bearer or official, and to hold office if elected or appointed; and
- to stand for election, and be eligible for appointment, as a trade-union representative, and to carry out, if so elected or appointed, the functions of a trade-union representative in terms of the LRA or any collective agreement.

Again, these rights are subject to the constitution of the union. If the constitution of a union requires that the nomination of a candidate as union office-bearer be signed by ten members in good standing, and also that the election be by means of a secret ballot at the union's annual conference, these provisions of the union constitution must be complied with.

The LRA specifically grants employees the right to freedom of association, and protects both employees and people seeking employment, should this right be infringed by the employer. Section 5 of the LRA prohibits a wide range of actions which infringe the right to freedom of association in section 4. In terms of section 5(1), "No person may discriminate against an employee for exercising any right conferred by this Act." Examples of such discrimination would include an employer's dismissal of an employee, or failure to give an employee a discretionary annual bonus, because the employee joined a trade union, and an employer's resort to harassment against an employee because that employee has been elected as a trade-union representative.

The general protection of section 5(1) is complemented by section 5(2), which prohibits certain specific types of conduct that would undermine freedom of association. In terms of section 5(2)(a), no person may require an employee

- not to be a member of a trade union;
- not to become a member; or
- to give up membership.

The LRA grants the right of freedom of association to employers as well.

Section 5(2)(b) provides that no person may prevent an employee (or a prospective employee) from exercising any right in terms of the LRA, or prevent an employee from participating in any LRA proceedings. For example, where an employer prevents an employee from standing for election as a trade-union representative, or where he threatens a union representative with dismissal because the representative is representing a union member at a disciplinary hearing, the employer would be acting unlawfully.

In terms of section 5(2)(c), employees or job seekers may not be prejudiced because of their trade-union membership, their joining a trade union, their participation in the lawful activities of a trade union, or their disclosure of information that they are entitled or required to disclose.

Section 5(3) prohibits an employer from attempting to persuade or tempt an employee into surrendering rights granted in terms of the LRA. The employer may not, for example, offer to promote the employee, or promise a wage increase, on the condition that the employee surrender rights accorded him by the LRA.

Section 5(4) provides that any contract of employment that limits freedom of association, either directly or indirectly, is regarded as invalid—irrespective of whether or not the contract was concluded before the LRA came into effect.

In terms of section 187 of the LRA, it will be an automatically unfair dismissal if the employer, in dismissing an employee, acts contrary to the provisions protecting an employee's right to freedom of association.

The protection of freedom of association, then, has two aspects:

1. Employers and employees must be protected against state infringement of the right. If the legislature enacts legislation that infringes the right, it may be challenged on the basis that it is in conflict with section 23 of the Constitution (South African National defense Union v Min of Defense and another).
2. Employees’ freedom of association should be protected against attempts by the employer to infringe this right. It is in this regard that the LRA plays an important role.

Although the right to freedom of association is not only guaranteed in terms of the LRA, but also in terms of the Constitution, the scope of this right has not been tested. The question has arisen, however, of whether or not groups excluded from the application of the LRA, such as the Defense Force, are entitled to form and join trade unions, based on their constitutional right to freedom of association. The issue came before the Constitutional Court in SANDU v Minister of Defence. The court found that, although uniformed members of the South African Defense Force, the Secret Service and the Intelligence Service are excluded from the protection of the LRA, they may claim the right to freedom of association under section 23 of the Constitution.

Section 4 of the LRA states that all employees have the rights set out in that section. Section 4 therefore applies to senior managers as well. This may in some circumstances, "and does," cause problems both for employers and for the managers themselves. A senior manager involved in the formulation of an employer's approach to the annual wage negotiations (including its "final offer") may not be able to perform his functions properly if he is also a member of the union sitting on the other side of the bargaining table. It might be difficult, too, for the manager not to divulge confidential information, bearing on the bargaining process, to the union.

This issue arose for decision in the case of Independent Municipal and Allied Trade Union v Rustenburg Transitional Council, where the Labour Court declared unconstitutional a prohibition on senior managers holding executive positions within a union. The court indicated, however, that there are limitations to the scope of section 4. It pointed out that, in terms of common-law principles, an employee owes an employer a "duty of fidelity"—a duty to act in good faith. Because of the conflicting aims of trade unions and employers, the joining of a union and participation in its affairs may, in terms of common-law principles at least, and especially in the case of senior managerial employees, breach this duty of fidelity.

Common-law principles have been amended by the Constitution, and especially by section 4 of the LRA. The court in IMATU stated that the rights granted in section 4 are "unequivocal and unconditional," but that they are not unlimited. Employees, including senior managers, are entitled to join trade unions and take part in their affairs, but this does not relieve them of their contractual obligations to their employers. If, for example, an employee takes time off without permission to attend to union affairs, the employee may be disciplined on the basis of misconduct. If a senior employee, part of whose job it is to conduct disciplinary enquiries, refuses to undertake this task when union members are disciplined, this will amount to incapacity.

A senior employee who has access to confidential information of the employer must also, the court added, tread carefully when conducting trade-union business, and ensure that this information is not disclosed.

In FAWU v The Cold Chain, where an employee was offered a managerial position as an alternative to retrenchment, on condition that he no longer participated in the activities of the union, he refused and was retrenched, and the court found his dismissal to be automatically unfair, holding that there was nothing absurd in permitting a senior managerial employee to participate in the activities of a trade union—provided that the employee complies with his contractual obligations.

In Kroukam v SA Airlink, the court held that Kroukam's dismissal was automatically unfair in terms of section 187(1)(d) of LRA, because he had been dismissed for union activities and for initiating litigation against the company on behalf of his union. The court, in delivering its verdict, cautioned against the argument that participation in trade-union activities destroys the trust relationship between employer and employee; such an argument is unacceptable on policy grounds.

Managerial employees, therefore, must balance the right to freedom of association with their common-law duty to act in good faith towards their employers. If a manager, for example, divulges information to the trade union that he acquired by virtue of his managerial position, he may be disciplined.

Sections 6 and 7 of the LRA grant and protect employer rights to freedom of association in terms similar to those granted to employees: to form, join and participate in the activities of employers’ organisations.

=== Union security arrangements ===
The Constitution allows for "union security arrangements contained in collective agreements." There is no firm definition of the term "union-security arrangements," but it is generally viewed as a generic term for a collective agreement between an employer or employers’ organisation and a trade union or trade unions, in terms of which union membership, or alternatively the payment of trade union subscriptions, is a condition of employment for all employees. Clearly this infringes upon an employee's right to freedom of association. Union security arrangements therefore require compulsory union membership, or compulsory payment of a union subscription.

In the South African context, the term "union-security arrangements" refers to the so-called "closed-shop" and "agency-shop" agreements. The only limits set in the Constitution are that such agreements must

- be contained in a collective agreement; and
- comply with the general limitations clause of the Constitution.

==== Controversy ====
The reason for these agreements relates to the nature and practice of collective bargaining. Under certain circumstances, employees who are not members of a trade union will be bound by the provisions of an agreement entered into by the union. In other circumstances, the employer may, in the interests of administrative convenience, extend the provisions of a collective agreement to non-union members. In effect, employees who are not members of the trade union may derive benefits from a collective agreement entered into by a union. "Understandably," unions have reservations about this state of affairs. These non-union employees are sometimes called "free riders," because they derive benefits for free: They do not pay union subscriptions, but they still obtain the benefits of the union's collective bargaining. This is the main argument in favour of forcing employees either to belong to a union (in the case of closed-shop agreements) or to pay a fee (in the case of agency-shop agreements).

Those who support union-security arrangements argue that they are necessary to avoid free riders. Furthermore, there is a view that they encourage "responsible" unionism. They support collective bargaining by aiding the development of strong and representative trade unions. Such arrangements are said to give union organizers a sense of security, and to enable them to devote themselves to the long-term interest of their members, "instead of collecting subscriptions and trying to persuade reluctant employees to join." For some, the main justification for union-security arrangements is that they add to the power of the unions during the collective-bargaining process, creating a more effective counterbalance to the naturally superior economic power of the corporate employer. This they do by preventing the defection of members during wage bargaining which may lead to strike action.

There may also be some benefit in such arrangements for the employer. If all employees belong to one union (or contribute to that union), the employer need only deal with that specific union. As a collective-bargaining relationship grows, a certain pattern and consistency of collective bargaining can thus be formed.

On the other hand, those who consider that the unions already possess monopoly status and excessive power see union security arrangements, particularly the closed shop, "as a main cause of undesirable state of affairs at the workplace." The main arguments against union security arrangements are,

- in the case of closed-shop agreements, that they give more power to the unions, since the union controls the pool of applicants for the post;
- in the case of agency-shop arrangements, that workers who are members of minority unions end up paying double subscriptions (one for their union and one for the representative union); and
- that union security arrangements, particularly closed-shop arrangements, infringe the right not to be a member of a trade union or the freedom not to associate, which is an intrinsic part of the right of freedom of association.

The two ILO Conventions on freedom of association and collective bargaining do not make any express reference to the notion of union-security arrangements. The ILO Committee also left it to the practice and regulation of each state to authorise and, where necessary, to regulate the use of union-security clauses in practice.

According to the committee, union security arrangements are compatible with the ILO Conventions on freedom of association, provided that they are the results of free negotiations between workers’ organisations and employers. As long as this is the case, then, the international body will not interfere with them, provided that the law of a particular country does not go so far as to impose them generally and make union membership compulsory. However, when trade union security clauses are imposed by the law itself, then the right to join an organization of one's own choosing is compromised, and those provisions will be incompatible with the ILO Convention. Accordingly, ILO member states are at liberty to include or not to include in their constitutions and labour legislation provisions regulating union-security arrangements.

Despite the arguments in favour of agency shops and closed shops, it would appear prima facie that these types of agreement do infringe the employee's freedom of association. Particularly in the case of a closed shop, an employee is no longer free not to associate: The employee must belong to a specific trade union. Employees are no longer free to choose which union they want to belong to, or even if they want to belong to a union at all. If the employee is not a member of a particular trade union, or if he loses his trade-union membership in terms of the union's constitution, the employee may end up out of a job.

It has been argued, accordingly, that the closed-shop agreement amounts to an infringement of the employee's freedom of association, as protected by sections 18 and 23 of the Constitution. The situation is different in the case of agency shops: The employee still has the freedom to choose whether or not he wants to belong to the union which is party to the collective agreement—"that is if the employee wants to belong to a union in the first place."

== Industrial action ==
The right to strike is clearly protected in South Africa through the Constitution, which guarantees that "every worker has the right [...] to strike." The Constitution does not give employers the right to lock out employees. Employers’ right to lock-out is implied in the Constitution's express protection of the right to bargain collectively. The LRA provides, however, in section 64(1), that every employee has the right to strike, and that every employer has recourse to a lock-out.

In the past few years, South Africa has seen a high level of industrial action. The Department of Labour has reported that working days lost to work stoppages in 2010 were the highest ever, with approximately 20,674,737 working days lost from about 74 work stoppages; in 2009, there were only 51.
