= General Accident Insurance v Xhego =

South African legal case

General Accident Insurance Co South Africa Ltd v Xhego and Others is a case in the South African law of delict, particularly the area of compensation for motor vehicle accidents. The case was heard in the Appellate Division, by Joubert JA, Van Heerden JA, Smalberger JA, FH Grosskopf JA and Van Coller AJA, on November 18, 1991, with judgment handed down on November 29. The appellant, whose attorneys were Silberbauers, Cape Town, and Symington & De Kok, Bloemfontein, was represented by BM Griesel. The respondents, whose attorneys were Coulter, Van Gend & Kotze, Claremont, and Webbers, Bloemfontein, were represented by BJR Whitehead.

The question was whether or not, in terms of section 8(1) of Motor Vehicle Accidents Act, the injuries to the claimants had been "caused by or aris[en] out of the driving of a motor vehicle." The claimants' injuries, fire burns, had been caused by petrol-bomb attack on the bus in which they were travelling. A number of other buses had been stoned or petrol-bombed on the same route a number of times during the previous four days. The route had even been closed for some months prior to the incident, due to unrest in the area, and had only been reopened some three weeks before the present incident. There was, the court found, a sufficiently close link between the injuries and the driving of the bus to conclude that the injuries had arisen out of such driving. A reasonable bus owner would have realised that there existed the real possibility of a serious attack on the bus on the route in question existed. The precautionary measures taken were found not to be sufficient, and the injuries sustained by the claimants due to the negligence of the owner of the bus.

== Facts ==
On October 11, 1986, the respondents sustained serious fire burns when the bus in which they were fare-paying passengers was attacked with petrol bombs. In an action instituted in a Provincial Division, in terms of section 8(1) of the Motor Vehicle Accidents Act, for damages for such injuries, the appellant, as defendant, pleaded that the injuries were not caused by nor arose out of the driving of the bus as intended in section 8(1). It was also denied that either the owner or the driver of the bus had been negligent.

It appeared that, during the four days prior to the attack in question, thirteen buses had been stoned or petrol-bombed along the same part of the route taken by the bus, or in that vicinity. The route had not been used by the bus-owner for some time during the 1985-1986 unrest, but the latter had started using that route again from September 22, 1986. It was not contended in the Provincial Division that the respondents' injuries had been "caused by" the driving of the bus as intended in section 8(1) of the Act, but the Court found that the injuries arose out of the driving of the bus and held the appellant liable.

== Judgment ==
In an appeal, the question for decision was whether the respondents had suffered injuries "arising out of the driving of" the bus as contemplated in section 8(1) of the Act. Van Coller AJA held, and the rest of the bench concurred, that there was, if one applied ordinary, common-sense standards, a sufficiently close link between the injuries and the driving of the bus to conclude that the injuries had arisen out of the driving of the bus. The bus was not merely being driven when the injuries were sustained; it was the very driving of the bus along the particular route which had elicited the petrolbombing. Van Coller AJA followed here the decision in Wells v Shield Insurance.

Having regard to the history of attacks on buses along the route in question, Van Coller AJA held that the reasonable bus-owner would have realised that a real possibility of a serious attack on buses on that route existed. It made no difference whether stones or petrol bombs were used. The judge held, further, on the facts, that the precautions taken by the bus-owner had not been sufficient. The Court a quo, therefore, had correctly found that the fire burns sustained by the respondents were due to the negligence of the owner of the bus. The appeal was thus dismissed and the decision of Nel J in the Cape Provincial Division, in Xhego and Others v General Accident Insurance Co South Africa Ltd confirmed.
