= Wolfaardt v Fedlife Assurance =

South African legal case

Wolfaardt v Fedlife Assurance Ltd is an important, precedent-setting case in South African labour law, decided by Odendaal AJ on August 31, 1999. It was heard in the Witwatersrand Local Division.

== Facts ==
The plaintiff sued the defendant for damages arising from an alleged repudiation of the plaintiff's contract of employment by the defendant. The defendant filed a special plea based on the Labour Court's exclusive jurisdiction to hear such matters in terms of section 157(1) of the Labour Relations Act. The plaintiff then excepted to the special plea on the basis that it disclosed no defence. The plaintiff's argument was that its claim was based on simple breach of contract and damages flowing therefrom.

== Judgment ==
The court that the crucial question was whether the ordinary civil courts, in light of the provisions of the Labour Relations Act, retained their jurisdiction to hear common-law contractual breaches of contracts of employment. The court found itself to be bound by a recent decision which appeared to be on all fours with the present case: That decision held that the simple enforcement of a contract of employment is not a matter falling within the exclusive jurisdiction of the Labour Court. Being unconvinced that this decision was wrong, the court followed it.

The Labour Relations Act was held to distinguish between the remedies of compensation and damages, both of which it was empowered to order. Awards of compensation were dealt with specifically, while that of damages was not. This being the case, the court held that damages did not fall within the exclusive jurisdiction of the Labour Court.

== See also ==
- Action (law)
- South African civil procedure
- South African labour law
- South African private law
