= Mokoena v Administrator, Transvaal =

South African legal case

In Mokoena and Others v Administrator, Transvaal, an important case in South African law, the first and second applicants sought an order in the Witwatersrand Local Division against the respondents. Such order was to declare inter alia, that their purported dismissal on 10 December 1987 from the employ of the Transvaal Provincial Administration was wrongful and unlawful. The matter came before Goldstone J.

== Facts ==
The relevant events preceding those of 10 December 1987 were common cause. The first and second respondents had been employed by the Administration as cleaners at the Vereeniging Hospital since 1974 and 1971 respectively. They had, since 1978 and 1976 respectively, been members of, and monthly contributors to, a pension scheme which now fell under the Temporary Employees Pension Fund Act On 27 October 1987, workers at the hospital went on strike. The reason for the strike was the refusal of the hospital's authorities to recognise the trade union to which the workers belonged and the subsequent dismissal of four of their leaders. The first respondent was on leave at the time, but she subsequently failed, when her leave ended, to return to work. The second respondent likewise stayed away from work.

The Administration proceeded to dismiss workers participating in the stay-away. It did so without giving them a hearing. The first respondent and three of her co-workers thereupon brought an urgent application in the Witwatersrand Local Division for an order declaring their purported dismissal wrongful and unlawful and of no force and effect.

== Judgment ==
The matter came before Goldstone J, who granted the application, holding that the applicants' membership of the pension scheme entitled them to a hearing before they could be dismissed, in accordance with the principles of natural justice enshrined in the maxim audi alteram partem. He stated,

That someone in the position of Mrs Mokoena or the other applicants who were members of the pension scheme can be dismissed and the right to their pension thereby destroyed on the whim of an official and without enquiry, must be repugnant to any reasonable and decent person. The unfairness of it is really patent.

He consequently held that the applicants were entitled to a hearing before a decision was taken to terminate their employment and so destroy their right to a pension upon retirement. He further stated that the official determining the question of their dismissal "would have been obliged to give honest and bona fide consideration to any representations made by them. Failure to have done so would have vitiated such a decision.

In addition to declaring the purported dismissal of the applicants wrongful and unlawful, Goldstone J also granted an order declaring that the applicants "remain in the lawful employ of the Transvaal Provincial Administration." The effect of the judgment, therefore, was that the applicants were reinstated in their employment.

== Appeal ==
The applicants appealed successfully against this ruling in Administrator, Transvaal v Theletsane.
