= Sindane v Prestige Cleaning Services =

South African legal case

Sindane v Prestige Cleaning Services is an important case in South African law, heard in the Labour Court, Johannesburg, on August 28, 2009. Judge Annali Basson presided. David Sindane, bringing an application in terms of section 191(5)(b)(ii) of the Labour Relations Act, appeared for himself; JH de Villiers Botha appeared for the respondent.

== Facts ==
When one of the respondent's clients scaled down its cleaning requirements, the services of the applicant and a colleague were terminated.

== Arguments ==
The applicant claimed that he had been unfairly dismissed for the respondent's operational requirements. The respondent claimed that his services had terminated according to the terms of his fixed-term contract, which provided that it would last only while the client required his services, and denied that the applicant had been dismissed.

== Judgment ==
Dealing first with whether or not the applicant was dismissed, the court noted that, if the respondent's argument were to be accepted, it would mean that it was entitled to make the termination of the contract dependent on a future event. The court noted further that, in SA Post Office v Mampeule, the court had held that contracts that made continued employment conditional on the happening of a particular event (in that case the employee's removal from the board of directors) were against public policy and unenforceable, as they were in conflict with the provisions of the LRA.

The court noted that employment contracts may be terminated in a number of ways that do not constitute "dismissals" as defined in the LRA. These include the expiry of a fixed-term contract after the passage of a specified time or on the happening of a specified event. In such cases, the cause of the termination is not an act by the employer, unless the employer frustrates a reasonable expectation that the contract will be renewed.

The SAPO case was distinguishable because, in that case, the termination of the contract was linked to alleged misconduct by the employee and not to the natural expiry of the contract. The court accordingly found that the applicant had not been dismissed.

The court added that, even if the applicant had been dismissed, the dismissal was substantively and procedurally fair, as he had been consulted, and the respondent had attempted to find alternative work for him.

The application was accordingly dismissed.

== See also ==
- South African labour law
