= Annali Basson =

South African judge (born 1960)

The Honourable Annali Basson

Judge of the High Court
- Incumbent
- Assumed office 1 January 2016
- Appointed by: Jacob Zuma
- Division: Gauteng

Judge of the Labour Court
- In office 1 July 2007 – 31 December 2015
- Appointed by: Thabo Mbeki

Personal details
- Born: 10 October 1960 (age 65) Pretoria, Transvaal; Union of South Africa
- Education: Afrikaanse Hoër Meisieskool
- Alma mater: University of Pretoria (BLC, LLB); University of South Africa (LLD)

Annali Christelle Basson (born 10 October 1960) is a South African judge of the High Court of South Africa. She was appointed to the Gauteng Division in January 2016 after serving in the Labour Court from 2007 to 2016. Before her appointment to the bench, she was a legal academic at the University of South Africa, where she specialised in labour law and mercantile law. She was an acting judge in the Constitutional Court in 2018 and was shortlisted for permanent appointment to that court in 2019.

== Early life and education ==
Basson was born on 10 October 1960 in Pretoria. She matriculated in 1978 at the Afrikaanse Hoër Meisieskool Pretoria and went on to the University of Pretoria, where she completed a BLC in 1982 and an LLB in 1984.

Later, in 1990, she completed an LLD at the University of South Africa, focusing on second-generation human rights with a labour law perspective. Basson later said that her doctoral research emerged from her own personal commitment to human rights.

== Academic career ==
While studying towards her LLB, Basson was a junior lecturer at the University of South Africa, where she taught mercantile law. In 2003, she was promoted to become a full professor of labour law, still in the mercantile law department. She remained in that position until July 2007, during which time she published in labour law, public law, and human rights law.

At the same time, Basson was admitted as an advocate in 1985 and was a member of the Pretoria Bar between 2003 and 2007. She was also a member of the Industrial Court from 1988 to 1994 and an ad hoc commissioner at the Commission for Conciliation, Mediation and Arbitration from 1996 to 2007.

== Labour Court: 2007–2015 ==
Basson left academia in order to become a judge of the Labour Court, joining the bench on 1 July 2007. She was appointed by President Thabo Mbeki on the recommendation of the Judicial Service Commission, and she presided in the court for over eight years. Her notable judgements in the Labour Court include David Crouch Marketing v Du Plessis and Sindane v Prestige Cleaning Services.

== Gauteng High Court: 2016–present ==
In October 2015, Basson was shortlisted and interviewed for possible appointment to fill vacancies arising in the Gauteng Division of the High Court of South Africa. During the interviews, Deputy Chief Justice Dikgang Moseneke lauded her "simply remarkable" academic performance. She was one of six candidates whom the Judicial Service Commission recommended for appointment to the vacancies, and President Jacob Zuma confirmed her appointment in December 2015, with effect from 1 January 2016.

=== Notable judgements ===
In November 2018, sitting in the Pretoria High Court, Basson handed down judgement in Baleni v Minister of Mineral Resources, sometimes known as the Xolobeni judgement. The case concerned community opposition to the Xolobeni mine, a proposed titanium mine in the Wild Coast region of the Eastern Cape. Basson affirmed that customary communities had customary rights to their land and agreed with the applicants' counsel, Tembeka Ngcukaitobi, that the Interim Protection of Informal Land Rights Act obliged the Minister of Mineral Resources to obtain the full consent of affected customary communities before granting commercial mining rights under the Mineral and Petroleum Resources Development Act.

In January 2022, in an application brought by the Organisation Undoing Tax Abuse, Basson ruled that the national Administrative Adjudication of Road Traffic Offences Act was unconstitutional insofar as it intruded upon local and provincial competences. However, in July 2023, the Constitutional Court unanimously overruled her in Organisation Undoing Tax Abuse v Minister of Transport, with Chief Justice Ray Zondo writing that the Constitution provided for the national Parliament to take on the relevant competences.

=== Higher courts ===
Basson was an acting judge in the Constitutional Court from July 2018 to December 2018, during which time she wrote for the court's majority in Competition Commission v Hosken Consolidated Investments and Steenkamp v Edcon. She later served as an acting judge in the Supreme Court of Appeal from June 2022 to November 2022.

In February 2019, the Judicial Service Commission announced that Basson was among six candidates who had been nominated for possible appointment to two permanent vacancies at the Constitutional Court. Interviews were held in April, and Basson was asked about her recent Baleni judgement, about land reform, and, by Supreme Court Justice Azhar Cachalia, about her apparent lack of experience in private law. She told the panel that she did not hesitate to engage in judicial activism and that her academic experience would assist her on the Constitutional Court. Following the interviews, the Judicial Service Commission recommended Basson and four others – Jody Kollapen, Steven Majiedt, Zukisa Tshiqi, and Patricia Goliath – as suitable for appointment. However, in September 2019, President Cyril Ramaphosa announced that he had elected to appoint Tshiqi and Majiedt, who widely been viewed as the frontrunners.

== Personal life ==
Basson has three children. She is a fifth-degree black belt in taekwondo, a former member of the executive board of the International Taekwondo Federation, and the former president of the federation's African branch. Before joining the bench, she was a member of the Pan Africanist Congress.
