= Fuel Retailers Association v Motor Industry Bargaining Council =

South African legal case

In Fuel Retailers Association of SA v Motor Industry Bargaining Council [2001] 6 BLLR 605 (LC), an important case in South African labour law, the Fuel Retailers Association (FRA) tried more than once to join a bargaining council, but because the council took the view that the FRA was not sufficiently representative to meet the requirements of the constitution, the application was refused. The Labour Court held that, when considering whether or not to order the admission of the new member, it had to consider the following:

- whether the party seeking admission falls within the registered scope of the council;
- the representivity of the council;
- whether it is sufficiently representative;
- stability in the industry; and
- the reasons advanced by the parties for objecting to the admission.

Other relevant factors include

- other advantages to the industry;
- whether the admission would promote orderly collective bargaining; and
- the extent to which the applicant party may disrupt the working of the bargaining council.

The Labour Court also considered any possible contribution to the organisational diversity of the council within its sector and area, the threshold for admission and other requirements of the constitution of the bargaining council.

The court concluded that the FRA should be admitted as a new member, and made an order to that effect.

== See also ==
- South African labour law
