= Administrator, Transvaal v Theletsane =

1990 South African court case

Administrator, Transvaal v Theletsane is an important case in South African law, heard in an Appellate Division comprising Botha JA, Smalberger JA, MT Steyn JA, FH Grosskopf JA and Nicholas AJA. The case was heard on November 5, 1990; judgment was delivered on November 30. The respondents' attorneys were SV Khampepe, Johannesburg, and EG Cooper & Sons, Bloemfontein. The appellants had the State Attorney.

The court found that an applicant may not seek to base a case on allegations contained in the respondent's answering affidavit where that case has not, in some way, been foreshadowed in the founding affidavit.

== Facts ==
The first and second respondents (as applicants) sought an order in a Local Division against the appellants (as respondents) declaring that their purported dismissal from the employ of the Transvaal Provincial Administration had been unlawful. The respondents' foundational allegation—that they were afforded no hearing—formed no part of the grounds upon which they obtained relief in the court a quo. That court, having regard to the averments made by the appellants (together with such facts as were common cause), held that, although the respondents had indeed been given a hearing, it had not been one which complied with the requirements of the audi rule.

== Issues ==
The issue was whether the Provincial Administration had complied with the audi alteram partem rule in dismissing the respondents.

== Arguments ==
The respondents denied that they had been afforded a hearing of any kind at all, while the appellants in their affidavits chose to show not only

1. that the respondents had been afforded a hearing; but also
2. that the hearing had been a proper and fair one.

The respondents did not seek to rely on their foundational allegation on appeal; they contended instead that the matter could be decided on the appellants' affidavits. They based their arguments on the premise that it appeared from those affidavits that the hearing did not comply with the audi rule.

== Judgment ==
Botha JA held for the majority (Smalberger JA dissenting) that it was not for the appellants to show that the respondents were given a proper hearing. They were called upon only to meet the specific allegations put forward by the respondents in support of the relief claimed. The appellants were required to answer a case founded on the allegation that the respondents were not given a hearing; they were not called upon in any other way to raise a valid defence to the relief sought.

It was not permissible, the court determined, to consider the appellants' affidavits in isolation, divorced from the context of the case they were answering. To the extent that the appellants' affidavits went further than may have been necessary to answer the case as presented, it could not be said the appellants would not be prejudiced if their affidavits were relied upon to determine the nature and ambit of the hearing that took place: To do so would be unfair to the appellants and tantamount to reversing the onus.

The court found that there was little scope, if any, for deciding matters of fact on the basis of a respondent's affidavits, where such affidavits dealt with facts not put forward directly in answer to the factual grounds of relief on which the applicant relied, particularly where the affidavits dealt equivocally with such facts, as was the case in the instant matter.

As to the issue whether the audi rule had been complied with, it appeared from the appellants' affidavits that the respondents had been given the opportunity to make representations. It was not clear from these affidavits, however, whether this opportunity had been expressed to be an unlimited one embracing all reasons why they should not be dismissed, or a restricted one confined only to reasons as to why they stayed away from work. This ambiguity made it unfair to the appellants to decide the case against them purely on their own affidavits.

In dealing with the equivocality of the contentions in the respondent's affidavits, it was not permissible to base factual findings regarding such contentions on a mere weighing up of the probabilities.

The court went on to hold that, inasmuch as there was also nothing in the respondents' affidavits worthy of investigation by viva voce evidence, justice required that the application to refer the matter to viva voce evidence had to be refused. The appeal was thus allowed and the decision of the Witwatersrand Local Division, in Theletsane and Others v Administrator, Transvaal, and Others reversed.
