= Murray v Minister of Defence =

South African legal case

Murray v Minister of Defence is an important case in South African labour law. An appeal from a decision in the Cape Provincial Division by Yekiso J, it was heard in the Supreme Court of Appeal (SCA) on 18 February 2008. Mpati DP, Cameron JA, Mlambo JA, Combrinck JA and Cachalia JA presided, handing down judgment on 31 March. Counsel for the appellant was KPCO von Lieres und Wilkau SC (with RB Engela); NJ Treurnicht SC (with AC Oosthuizen SC) appeared for the respondent. The appellant's attorneys were Van der Spuy Attorneys, Cape Town, and Hill McHardy & Herbst Ing, Bloemfontein. The respondent was represented by the State Attorney, Cape Town, and the State Attorney, Bloemfontein.

The court found that the right to fair labour practices, in section 23(1) of the Constitution, imports into the common-law contract of employment the general term that the employer will not, without reasonable and proper cause, conduct itself in a manner calculated and likely to destroy or seriously damage its relationship of confidence and trust with its employee. The court thus imposed "a new general and contractual obligation on employers"—a duty of fair dealing with employees. In this the court had broken with the much-criticised common-law rule that "an employer is free to terminate the contract at any stage, for any reason or indeed for no reason or the worst possible reason, provided only that the requisite notice is given." The contract of employment, therefore, may now be relied upon where there is an overlap with section 186(2) of the Labour Relations Act (LRA), or where that section does not provide for a remedy.

The court also considered what constitutes constructive dismissal: that is to say, broadly speaking, resignation due to intolerable conditions at work. It found that, although certain employees are not recognised as such for the purposes of the LRA, the constitutional right to fair labour practices is nevertheless applicable to them, and that the common-law contract of employment now includes protection against constructive dismissal. The employee had a contractual right not to be dismissed. It was also held that, for a successful claim based on constructive dismissal, the employer must not only be responsible for the circumstances which induce the employee to resign; it must also be to blame for those circumstances.

== Facts ==
Murray instituted action in the High Court in which he claimed damages for loss of income consequent upon his alleged constructive dismissal from the South African Navy, because its "continual unfair and ill-treatment" of him over a period of some two and a half years had left him with no alternative but to resign from his post. The Navy's response to the operational conundrum involving the appellant had been to offer him, immediately prior to his resignation, an alternative post at Naval Headquarters in Pretoria. The Navy made no effort, however, to explain the job to the appellant, and so he rejected the offer.

Had Murray been covered by the LRA, he would have had specific remedies in terms of the Act. As the Act does not apply to members of the South African National Defence Force (SANDF), however, he relied on purely contractual grounds when he approached the High Court.

The High Court found that the employment relationship had not broken down irretrievably and that none of the appellant's complaints had rendered his position intolerable or caused him to resign, and accordingly dismissed the action.

== Judgment ==
On appeal to the SCA, Cameron JA held—and Mpati DP, Mlambo JA, Combrinck JA and Cachalia JA concurred—that, since the LRA expressly excluded members of the SANDF from its operation, there was no directly applicable statute to the present set of circumstances. Section 23(1) of the Constitution, which guaranteed everyone "the right to fair labour practices," did, however, cover members of the defence force. Consistent with that right, Cameron broadened the common law of employment so as to impose a duty of fair dealing with their employees on all employers, including those not covered by the LRA. In addition to the right to fair labour practices, Cameron found that Murray was entitled to rely on his right to dignity and his contractual rights.

Cameron held further that South African employment law implied into a contract of employment a general term that the employer would not, without reasonable and proper cause, conduct itself in a manner calculated and likely to destroy or seriously damage the relationship of confidence and trust with the employee. Breach of the term would amount to a contractual repudiation justifying the employee in resigning and claiming compensation for dismissal.

Viewed, in the alternative, through the constitutional standard, the constitutional guarantee of fair labour practices, Cameron found, continued to cover a non-LRA employee who resigned because of intolerable conduct by his employer, and to offer protection through the constitutionally-developed common law. If it was thus found that unfair conduct by the navy had forced the appellant to resign, he would be entitled to damages for dismissal.

Cameron determined that the mere fact that an employee had resigned because his work had become intolerable was not enough to make it a constructive dismissal. The critical circumstances had to have been of the employer's making; in addition, the employer had to be to blame, culpably responsible in some way, for the intolerable conditions. The conduct had to have lacked "reasonable and proper cause."

There could be little doubt in Cameron's mind that, when the appellant had resigned his position at work, it had been intolerable. There was equally little doubt that this was because of the navy's conduct. The question, then, was whether or not the navy had had reasonable and proper cause for what it did in making the appellant's position intolerable, or (viewed through the constitutional standard) whether it had acted fairly in making his position intolerable. Was the navy to blame, in other words?

Cameron held, on the evidence before him, that the Navy had established in most respects that its management of the appellant's employment was substantially fair. Only in one respect was it unfair: its decision to downgrade the appellant's post without first consulting with him.

The answer to the appellant's action lay in the navy's offer of an alternative post to the appellant immediately prior to his resignation. Given the background of the appellant's case, the Navy could not be faulted for not returning the appellant to his original post. In the particular circumstances, however, the law clearly placed a duty on the employer to consult fully with the employee affected and to share information to enable him to make informed decisions. The navy, noted Cameron, had not fulfilled that responsibility: Explaining the job offer was anything but superfluous, since it was an entirely new position, and in addition the appellant's subjective condition of suspicion, demoralisation and depression, which was evident to those dealing with him, was materially relevant to how the navy was required by fairness to deal with him. His condition meant that an unexplained offer of a new post was likely to be rejected. The lack of explanation, follow-up and elucidation did not constitute fair dealing. The navy had breached its common-law duty to treat Murray fairly, thus rendering his resignation a constructive dismissal.

Had the navy adequately and fairly explained the post to the appellant, and the backup it offered, his position would not, Cameron found, have been intolerable. Its failure to do so meant that the operating cause of the appellant's resignation was the navy's conduct. The appeal, accordingly, had to be upheld. The order of the court a quo was set aside and replaced with an order declaring that the plaintiff was entitled to such compensation as he might prove for his constructive dismissal by the defendant. The decision in Murray v Minister of Defence was thus reversed.

== Legacy ==
Murray was followed in Daymon Worldwide SA Inc. v CCMA and Others, where the Labour Court found that a company had done what it could to assist a woman who had resigned because she had allegedly been sexually harassed. In Mogothle v Premier, Northwest Province, the Labour Court relied on the employer's duty of fair dealing with employees to find the suspension of an employee unfair not in terms of section 186 of the LRA, but rather in terms of the common law.
