= Wallach v Lew Geffen Estates =

South African legal case

Wallach v Lew Geffen Estates CC is an important case in South African law, heard in the Appellate Division. The judges were Hoexter JA, Milne JA, Grosskopf JA, Goldstone JA and Howie AJA. An appeal from a decision in the Witwatersrand Local Division by Lazarus J, the case was heard on March 22, 1993, with judgment handed down on March 25. The court found that there is no obligation on a person to whom a cheque has been given to present the cheque on the day on which it was received. The court also held that it is open to Court at a motion or application hearing to hold that it is unnecessary to hear oral evidence and decide matter on the papers. Such a course would be justified where the hearing of oral evidence would not and could not have affected the outcome of the claim for substantive relief, and would have caused unnecessary costs and delay.

== Judgment ==
Milne JA held—and Hoexter JA, F H Grosskopf JA, Goldstone JA and Howie AJA concurred—that there is no obligation on a person to whom a cheque has been given to present the cheque on the day on which it was received.

The court also found that, where, in an application on notice of motion, an order has been made referring the application for the hearing of oral evidence (such an order amounting to a non-appealable ruling), it is open to the court, when the matter comes before it for such hearing of oral evidence, to hold that it is unnecessary to hear oral evidence and to decide the matter on the papers.

In an appeal from an order in a Local Division (decided on the papers in an application on notice of motion after the Local Division had held that it was unnecessary to hear oral evidence, notwithstanding the fact that the matter had earlier been referred by the court for the hearing of oral evidence), the court held that there had been weighty considerations justifying the decision not to hear evidence: namely, that the hearing of oral evidence would not and could not have affected the outcome of the claim for substantive relief, and would have caused unnecessary costs to have been incurred and have involved unnecessary delay.

The decision in the Witwatersrand Local Division, in Lew Geffen Estates CC v Wallach, was thus confirmed.

== See also ==
- Civil procedure in South Africa
- Law of South Africa
