= David Crouch Marketing v Du Plessis =

South African legal case

- Court: Labour Court of South Africa
- Full case name: David Crouch Marketing CC v Mark Du Plessis
- Decided: 17 June 2009
- Docket nos.: J2499/08
- Citations: [2009] ZALC 63; (2009) 30 ILJ 1828 (LC)

Case opinions
- Decision by: Basson J

David Crouch Marketing CC v Du Plessis is a decision in South African labour law, handed down on 17 June 2009. The case was heard on 21 May 2009 in the Labour Court of South Africa, sitting in Johannesburg, by Judge Annali Basson. It concerned the enforceability of agreements in restraint of trade.

== Facts ==
On the return date of an interim order granted by the court to the applicant, the respondent, Mark du Plessis, opposed the confirmation of the order. In terms of the order, the respondent was interdicted

- from revealing or disclosing any of the applicant's confidential information, technical know-how and/or financial information;
- from competing with the business of the applicant for a period of three years; and
- from directly and indirectly—alternatively from unlawfully—competing with the applicant in breach of the respondent's restraint of trade covenant.

== Judgment ==
The court held that agreements in restraint of trade, voluntarily entered into pursuant to one's right to freedom to contract, are valid and enforceable unless the party seeking to escape this agreement can show that the agreement is unreasonable and therefore contrary to public policy. Whether or not the agreement is unreasonable should be evaluated taking into account all the circumstances of the case, including the relevant circumstances which exist at the time of the enforcement of the restraint of trade.

It will not be in the interest of public policy, the court found, to enforce a restraint of trade if it aims to prevent one party from participating in the commercial world after termination of their contractual relationship in the absence of a protectable interest of the erstwhile employer.

In casu, the court found that the applicant had failed to place evidence before the court to show that the information or business methods which it sought to protect were protectable. The interim order was therefore not confirmed.

== See also ==
- Labour law
