= Pressma Services v Schuttler =

South African legal case

Pressma Services (Pty) Ltd v Schuttler and Another is an important case in South African labour law, heard in the Cape Provincial Division on 19 April 1989 by Van Schalkwyk AJ, who delivered judgment on 12 September. The applicant's attorneys were Ince, Wood & Raubenheimer; the respondents' attorneys were Lindsay, Schneider & Kawalsky. The case concerned an application in terms of section 424(1) of the Companies Act and argument on a point in limine. RR Horn appeared for the applicant; KAB Engers appeared for the respondent.

The court found, in respect of the liability of directors and officers of a company for its debts, that the object sought to be achieved by section 424(1) of the Companies Act was twofold:

1. to render personally liable all persons who knowingly participated in the fraudulent or reckless conduct of the business of a company; and
2. to provide creditors with a meaningful remedy against the abuses at which section was aimed.

The rights conferred on creditors by section 424(1) did not cease to exist, the court found, upon the sanctioning and implementation of an offer of compromise in terms of section 311. The words "creditor [...] of the company" in section 424(1) were to be construed as including person in respect of whom there had been an existing indebtedness at the time when the compromise was sanctioned.

The court found additionally that, when disputes which had arisen such as would give rise to a variety of wide-ranging and substantial factual enquiries, the procedure under Rule 6(5)(g) of the Uniform Rules of Court was not appropriate. It was more appropriate to order the parties to trial. The affidavits in this case were not lengthy; they contained all the necessary averments and defined the issues with sufficient clarity. It would have been pointless, therefore, to order a filing of pleadings. The court, to save time and further expense, ordered the affidavits to stand as pleadings which were closed.

== Facts ==
A company, of which the applicant had been a creditor, had been placed in provisional liquidation. The respondents had been directors of the company prior to its liquidation. An offer of compromise (against which the applicant had voted) had been accepted by the requisite majorities of creditors, and had been sanctioned by the court in terms of section 311 of the Companies Act. The company was then discharged from liquidation. Among the terms of the compromise were

- that creditors' rights to obtain payment of their claims were limited to such rights as were provided for in the offer;
- that creditors ceased to have any further claims against the company or the offeror; and
- that creditors' claims (reduced by R1) would be deemed to have been ceded to the offeror.

The applicant thereafter instituted proceedings against the respondents, claiming payment of R47,568.69, on the grounds that, in terms of section 424(1) of the Act, the respondents were personally liable for payment of its claim against the company.

== Arguments ==
The respondents raised the following points in limine:

- that the applicant did not have the right to proceed in terms of section 424(1), as it had ceased to be a creditor of the company upon the offer of compromise being sanctioned and implemented;
- that the applicant was therefore no longer a "creditor [...] of the company" within the meaning of that phrase in section 424(1); and
- therefore, that the applicant had no locus standi to institute proceedings under that section.

== Issues ==
The issues were as follows:

- whether the right conferred upon creditors by section 424(1) was ipso iure extinguished upon the sanctioning and implementing of an offer of compromise; and, if not,
- whether the applicant was a creditor within the meaning of the phrase "creditor [...] of the company" in section 424(1) after the offer of compromise had been sanctioned and implemented.

In addition, it was apparent from the papers that there were substantial disputes of fact which could not be resolved without recourse to oral evidence. The question arose, if the point in limine failed, as to whether the matter should be referred for the hearing of oral evidence in terms of Rule 6(5)(g) of the Uniform Rules of Court.

== Judgment ==
The court held that the primary object sought to be achieved by section 424(1) was two-fold:

1. to render personally liable all persons who knowingly had participated in the fraudulent or reckless conduct of the business of the company; and
2. to provide creditors (among others) with a meaningful remedy against the abuses at which the section was directed.

The court held further, as to whether or not the right conferred upon creditors by section 424(1) was ipso iure extinguished upon the sanctioning and implementing of an offer of compromise, that it would be unthinkable that the legislature could have intended that the aforestated purposes should be frustrated and the remedy provided for could be lost because of the sanctioning and implementation of a compromise in terms of section 311; indeed, there was nothing, either in section 311 or in section 424, which could justify the conclusion that the right conferred upon a creditor by section 424(1) ipso iure ceased to exist upon the sanctioning and implementation of a compromise.

The court found, accordingly, that the right conferred on creditors by section 424(1) was not ipso iure extinguished upon the sanctioning and implementation of an offer of compromise in terms of section 311.

As to whether or not the applicant was a creditor within the meaning of the phrase "creditor [...] of the company" in section 424(1) after the offer of compromise had been sanctioned and implemented, the court found that the phrase could mean a person who is a creditor of the company at the time when he approaches the court, in the sense that there is a then-existing indebtedness (the ordinary, restricted meaning), or they could mean, in addition, a person in respect of whom there had been an indebtedness which had ceased to exist upon the sanctioning and implementing of a compromise.

The second object sought to be achieved by section 424(1)—that is, to provide creditors with a meaningful remedy—would not be attained, the court found, if the more restricted meaning were adopted, because it was to creditors that the debts of the company in respect of which personal liability was created by the section were owed. To hold otherwise would give rise to the curious result that, following the sanctioning and implementation of a compromise, erstwhile creditors of the company would in certain circumstances be in a less favourable position than they would have been in had the company been wound up.

The court held, accordingly, that the words "creditor [...] of the company" in section 424(1) had to be construed so as to include a person in respect of whom there had been an existing indebtedness at the time when the compromise was sanctioned. The point in limine was thus dismissed.

Certain disputes of fact had arisen between the parties which were such as would give rise to a variety of wide-ranging factual enquiries involving real and substantial questions of fact. Although such disputes had been clearly foreseeable, the court determined that it would in the circumstances serve no purpose to dismiss the application. The procedure envisaged in Rule 6(5)(g), of referring such disputes of fact for the hearing of oral evidence, was not intended, the court found, for the purpose of resolving disputes of the kind that had arisen in the present case. Accordingly, it would be more appropriate to order the parties to trial.

As the affidavits filed were not lengthy, contained all the necessary averments and defined the issues with sufficient clarity, the court held that it would be pointless to order pleadings to be filed. Accordingly, and to save time and further expense, and as the particular circumstances of the case dictated such a course, it was found to be more appropriate to order that the affidavits stand as pleadings which were closed. The court ordered accordingly.

== See also ==
- Civil procedure in South Africa
- South African company law
