= Independent Municipal and Allied Trade Union v Rustenburg Transitional Council =

South African legal case

Independent Municipal & Allied Trade Union v Rustenburg Transitional Council is a significant case in South African labour law. The council, the employer in this case, had adopted a resolution prohibiting employees in senior managerial positions from holding executive positions in trade unions or engaging in trade-union activities. Although, the resolution was later amended to permit trade-union activities, the ban on holding executive positions remained.

A union representing council employees, including senior managers who were union members, approached the Labour Court to declare the resolution unconstitutional.

The court granted the order, but noted limitations to the scope of section 4 of the Labour Relations Act.

It pointed out that, in terms of common-law principles, an employee owed an employer a "duty of fidelity"—that is, a duty to act in good faith—and that, because of the conflicting aims of trade unions and employers, participation in trade-union activities could, in the case of senior managerial employees, breach this duty of fidelity.

== See also ==
- South African labour law
