= SANDU v Minister of Defence (1999) =

South African legal case

South African National Defence Union v Minister of Defence & Another, an important case from 1999 in South African labour law, concerned the question of whether or not it was constitutional to prohibit members of the armed forces from participating in public protest action, and from joining trade unions.

== High Court ==
Justice Hartzenburg, in the Transvaal High Court, declared that a provision of the Defence Act prohibiting members of the Defence Force from becoming members of a trade union, and from engaging in any “protest action” as defined in the Act, was unconstitutional. To have any force and effect, however, the declaration of invalidity had to be confirmed by the Constitutional Court.

== Constitutional Court ==
The Minister of Defence and the Chief of the Defence Force (the respondents in this matter), opposed confirmation of the order of invalidity only in respect of the prohibition on joining trade unions. The South African Defence Force Union (the applicant) accepted that strike action was inappropriate in the military context, but argued that this should not prevent members of the Defence Force from joining a trade union.

=== Judgment ===
==== O'Regan J ====
===== Public protest =====
In a majority judgement, delivered by Justice O'Regan, the Constitutional Court decided that prohibiting participation in acts of public protest violated the right to freedom of expression of Defence Force members. This curtailed the right of Defence Force members to receive and express opinions on a wide range of issues, whether in public or private gatherings, and amounted to a grave infringement on the fundamental rights of soldiers. The court determined that this infringement constituted an unjustifiable limitation upon the right to freedom of expression, and was consequently unconstitutional. The court indicated, however, that a different legislative provision, narrower in its scope, may be constitutionally justified. This question, though, was obviously not before the court.

===== Trade union membership =====
The applicant argued that prohibiting membership of a trade union infringed the constitutional right of “every worker” “to form and join a trade union.” Turning to international law, as mandated by the Constitution, O’Regan considered the Convention on Freedom of Association, which specifically provides that soldiers and spies may join trade unions, but does not prescribe the facets of trade-union life to which soldiers and spies are entitled. These questions are left to the country in question to regulate and determine itself. Referring to the International Labour Organization’s construction of “worker”, Justice O’Regan interpreted the term “every worker” to include members of the armed forces, even though their relationship with the Defence Force is unusual and not identical to that of an ordinary employment relationship. One “enrols” in the permanent force; there is no job interview, etc., as a result of or requirement for enrolment. Furthermore, certain unusual rights and obligations are incurred.

The court decided that this is a case in which a generous interpretation of the right is appropriate. Although members of the Defence Force may not be employees in the full contractual sense of the word, their conditions of enrolment in many respects mirror those of people employed under an ordinary contract of employment. In other words, they are not "employees" in the fullest sense, but there are some similarities between their position and that of employment.

The court stated that, in appropriate circumstances, the constitutional right to join a trade union may be limited, provided that such a limitation is constitutionally justifiable. The question, therefore, was this: Does the legislation's blanket ban on trade-union activity for such workers limit the right enshrined in section 36 of the Constitution? If so, is that limit justifiable?

The respondents contended that any infringement of the right was justified by the constitutional imperative to structure and manage the Defence Force as a “disciplined military force.” They maintained that a Defence Force could not be such a “disciplined military force” if its members belonged to trade unions and wished to exercise their rights to collective bargaining and strike action.

The applicant argued that a trade union could function and further the interests of its members without participating in strike action. The court decided that the requirement of strict discipline would not necessarily be undermined by permitting Defence Force members to join a trade union, as the structure and scope of such a union might differ, given the military environment. A blanket prohibition on trade-union activity was therefore unjustifiable.

The court decided that the order of invalidity in respect of trade-union membership would only come into force three months from the date of judgement. The court added as a proviso that, if the delayed order would cause either party substantial prejudice, such party might approach the Constitutional Court for a variation of the order.

==== Sachs J ====
In a separate and concurring judgement, Justice Albie Sachs made two qualifications to the judgement of Justice O’Regan.

===== Public protest =====
First, reinforcing the centrality of freedom of expression in South Africa's constitutional democracy, Sachs added that a blindly obedient soldier represented a greater threat to the constitutional order than a constitutionally conscientious one who regarded him- or herself as a citizen in uniform.

===== Freedom of association =====
Secondly, since the Constitution guarantees freedom of association and fair labour practices, soldiers are entitled to form a body such as SANDU to look after their employment interests. Therefore, it was unnecessary to decide whether soldiers qualified as "workers." To do so might give them a promise of full workers and trade union rights that turned out to be empty, and also suggest that hard-won workers’ rights could easily be limited.

== See also ==
- Labour law in South Africa
