= FAWU v The Cold Chain =

South African legal case

In Food and Allied Workers Union and Another v The Cold Chain, an important case in South African labour law, the Labour Court held that there was nothing absurd in permitting a senior managerial employee to participate in the activities of a trade union, provided that the employee complies with his contractual obligations. In this case, the employee was offered a managerial position as an alternative to retrenchment, on condition that he no longer participated in the activities of the trade union. When he refused, he was retrenched. The court did not hesitate to find the dismissal to be automatically unfair.

== See also ==
- South African labour law
