= Kroukam v SA Airlink =

South African legal case

Kroukam v SA Airlink (Pty) Ltd is an important case in South African labour law.

== Facts and argument ==
The Appellant was employed as a senior pilot. He was dismissed after being found guilty of insubordination and constituting a disruptive influence in the operations of the company. At the time of his dismissal he was also the chairperson of the Airlines Pilots Association (a trade union). He contended that his dismissal was in fact automatically unfair in terms of section 187(1)(d) of the Labour Relations Act, because he had been dismissed for union activities and for initiating litigation against the company on behalf of the union.

== Judgment ==
The court held the dismissal to have been automatically unfair as contemplated by section 187(1 )(d) of the LRA. In coming to this conclusion, the court cautioned against an argument that participation in trade-union activities destroys the trust relationship —

In my view it would undermine the protection that the Constitution and the Act seek to confer on union officials or representatives and employees against victimization for the exercise of their constitutional and statutory rights to accept a proposition the effect of which would be that an employer may destroy a trust relationship by victimizing an employee and then benefit from such illegitimate and unlawful conduct. The proposition that even if the court concluded that the employee was indeed dismissed for an illegitimate and unlawful or unconstitutional reason, he must still lose his job because the illegitimate conduct of the employer has destroyed such trust relationship is, in my view, unacceptable as a matter of policy. An employer who acts in breach of such fundamental rights must, as a matter of policy, not be allowed to benefit from his unacceptable conduct. An approach of a court which allows such conduct to prevail may itself be in conflict with some of the values and principles which make up the foundation of our post-apartheid society.

== See also ==
- South African labour law
