= Wells v Shield Insurance =

Wells and Another v Shield Insurance Co Ltd and Others is an important case in the South African law of delict. It was heard in the Cape Provincial Division by Corbett J on March 15, 1965, with judgment handed down on April 7. The attorneys of the excipient (or second defendant), who was represented in court by DL Kooy, SC (with him DO Delahunt), were Reilly, Reilly & Tucker. The respondent's attorneys were Sonnenberg, Hoffman & Galombik, and he was represented by S. Aaron.

The case involved an exception to a declaration, and turned on the question of the meaning and effect of section 11(1) of the Motor Vehicle Insurance Act, in particular the meaning of the word "Driving" (regard being had to section 1(3). The court determined that, when the driver of a car opens its door after parking it, he has not perpetrated an act "caused by nor arising out of" the driving of the car.

== Facts ==
After the third defendant had manoeuvred his car into a parking bay, switched off his engine and applied the hand-brake, he had reached behind him to remove an article from the back seat, and then opened the door preparatory to alighting. At this moment, a trackless tram struck the door, which protruded into its path, causing it to crash into another motorcar, and thus to injure the plaintiff and his wife. To a summons and declaration claiming damages from the insurer of the tram, the insurer of third defendant's car (the second defendant) and the third defendant, the second defendant had excepted on the ground that the plaintiffs' injuries had neither been "caused by" nor "arisen out of" the third defendant's driving of the car within the meaning of section 11 (1) of the Motor Vehicle Insurance Act.

== Judgment ==
In order to give a wider application than the phrase "caused by" to the phrase "arising out of" (and thereby to prevent it from becoming redundant), Corbett J held that it must be regarded, as it appeared in section 11 (1) of the Act, as covering cases where the driving is an indirect cause of the infliction of the injury. Where the direct cause is some antecedent or ancillary act, then it could not normally be said that the death or injury was "caused by" the driving, but it might be found to "arise out of" the driving. Whether this would be found would depend upon the particular facts of the case and whether, "applying ordinary, common-sense standards," it could be said that the causal connection between the death or injury and the driving was sufficiently real and close to enable the court to say that the death or injury did in fact arise out of the driving. The word "driving," as used in relation to the insured motor vehicle, means "ordinarily [...] the urging on, directing the course and general control of the vehicle while in motion and all other acts reasonably or necessarily incidental thereto."

Corbett J held, as against the second defendant, that the plaintiffs' injuries had not been caused by, nor had they arisen out of, the driving of the insured vehicle; accordingly, the exception was upheld with costs.

== See also ==
- South African law
- South African law of delict
- Insurance
