= SA Post Office v Mampeule =

South African legal case

SA Post Office Ltd v Mampeule is an important case in South African labour law, heard in the Labour Court.

== Facts ==
The South African Post Office (SAPO) sought a declaratory order that the termination of a certain Mr K. Mampeule's employment, as a direct result of his removal on May 21, 2007, from SAPO's board of directors, did not constitute a dismissal for purposes of section 186(1)(a) of the Labour Relations Act (LRA). This proposition was founded on a term of Mampeule's contract of employment with SAPO, read together with SAPO's Articles of Association, to the effect that his removal from SAPO's Board gave rise unavoidably to the automatic and simultaneous termination of his employment contract with SAPO.

Mampeule was appointed as SAPO's Chief Executive Officer on a five-year fixed-term contract. In terms of the said contract of employment, the employment relationship could be terminated on any of four grounds, namely:

1. automatically upon expiry of the five-year period;
2. incapacity resulting from poor work performance or ill-health;
3. misconduct; or
4. SAPO's operational requirements.

The Minister of Communications suspended Mampeule pending a forensic audit into his conduct. Subsequent thereto Mampeule was removed as a director of SAPO pursuant to the provisions of section 220 of the Companies Act, arising from a resolution tabled by the Minister of Communications for Mampeule to be removed as a director. The day after the meeting when Mampeule was removed as a director, the chairperson of SAPO's Board formally informed Mampeule in writing that following his removal from SAPO's Board, his employment contract has terminated automatically and simultaneously with his removal as a director.

Counsel for SAPO argued that SAPO did not terminate Mampeule's contract of employment. It was argued that the termination of Mampeule's contract of employment came about as an automatic and simultaneous result of his removal from SAPO's Board. Thus, it was Mampeule's removal from SAPO's Board by operation of a contractual term that brought about the termination of his employment contract, and not by virtue of a deliberate act on the part of SAPO to sever the employment relationship. As such, it was argued by counsel for SAPO that there was no dismissal of Mampeule by SAPO.

== Judgment ==
Ngalwana AJ ruled that Mampeule had indeed been dismissed by SAPO, inter alia, for the following reasons:

- Clause 9 of Mampeule's employment contract, read together with the Articles of Association of SAPO, introduced a fifth ground upon which Mampeule's contract of employment could be terminated, that being upon his removal from SAPO's Board as a director.
- Any act by an employer which results, directly or indirectly, in the termination of an employee's contract of employment constitutes a dismissal within the meaning of section 186(1)(a) of the LRA.
- The employment contract of Mampeule permitted automatic termination as alleged by SAPO.

The question was whether that is permissible in law. The court referred to the English Court of Appeal case of Igbo v Johnson Matthey Chemicals Ltd. The court found that the terms of Mampeule's employment contract could not neatly be construed in isolation from SAPO's act of removing Mampeule from the Board. Effectively, had the Minister of Communications not removed Mampeule from the Board, his employment would not have terminated. The removal of Mampeule as a director triggered, proximately or effectively, the termination of his employment. The effective cause of termination of Mampeule's contract of employment was thus clearly the Minister's removal of him from SAPO's Board.

The court held that the automatic termination clause was impermissible and could not rightly be invoked to stave off the clear and unambiguous effect of the Minister's overt act, and concluded that the termination of Mampeule's contract of employment pursuant to a contractual term in his employment contract, read together with the Articles of Association of SAPO, were impermissible in their truncation of the provisions of Schedule 8 of the LRA—and possibly even the concomitant constitutional right to fair labour practices. Provisions of this sort, militating as they do against public policy by which statutory rights conferred on employees are for the benefit of all employees and not just an individual, are incapable of consensual validation between parties to a contract by way of waiver of the rights so conferred.

== See also ==
- South African law
- South African labour law
