= South African labour law =

Regulates relationships between employers, employees and trade unions

The labour law in South Africa since the colonial times has regulated the relationship between employers, employees and trade unions in the country.

== History ==
The Native Labour Regulations Act 1911 prohibited strikes by trade unions, introduced wage ceilings and a pass system for moving around jobs. Over 70,000 Chinese labourers were brought in, and used by landowners to undercut the wages of other workers. Among white workers, there was significant unrest, and major strikes took place in 1907, 1913, 1914 and 1922

For a period of sixteen years, from 1979 to 1995, several critical developments occurred in the field of labour law in South Africa, beginning with a radical change in the first of these years, when a significant Commission of Enquiry was held, resulting in the establishment of an Industrial Court, which was given extensive powers to mould, change, shape and develop the law. Prior to 1995, most labour relations were based on contracts. In 1995, much of the law developed by the Commission and the Industrial Court was put together in the Labour Relations Act 1995 (LRA). Since then, most labour law has been based on statute.

Prior to 1995, an employee could be dismissed in terms of the contract of employment, which could permit any reason for dismissal. Since 1995, an employee may be dismissed only for misconduct, operational reasons and incapacity. The Labour Relations Act 1995 is a pivotal piece of legislation, as it recognises the need for fast and easy access to justice in labour disputes. The Industrial Court had the status of a High Court, and therefore was not accessible to all labourers.

1995 also saw the introduction of the Commission for Conciliation, Mediation and Arbitration (CCMA) which is an administrative tribunal. The Commission for Conciliation, Mediation and Arbitration endeavours first and foremost to conciliate between the parties. If it is unsuccessful in this, the matter moves on to arbitration. The entire process is very informal, and at no charge, and is therefore very accessible to labourers, who often use it: About 300 new cases are brought before the Commission for Conciliation, Mediation and Arbitration daily. In addition to the Commission for Conciliation, Mediation and Arbitration, 1995 saw the introduction of bargaining councils, which allow for communication across the industry. A bargaining council is organised collectively and voluntarily, and must be registered. In order to be registered, an alternative-dispute-resolution mechanism, similar to the Commission for Conciliation, Mediation and Arbitration, must be put in place.

The Labour Relations Act 1995 also regulated the issue of fairness, not only in termination but during employment, too. In 1998, however, most of the law on unfair labour practices was removed from the Labour Relations Act 1995 and put into the Employment Equity Act (EEA). The EEA also deals with issues such as fairness regarding a worker's human immunodeficiency virus (HIV) status or disability, as well as the issue of affirmative action.

The Basic Conditions of Employment Act (BCEA), the Health and Safety Acts and the Skills Development Act, must be read with the EEA. The Skills Development Act provides that a small percentage of a labourer's salary must be contributed to the Department of Labour, enabling certain workshops to be run which are designed to develop skills.

== Constitution ==
Chapter 2 of the Constitution contains several provisions of relevance to employment and labour law:

- the right to equality
- protection of dignity
- protection against servitude, forced labour and discrimination
- the right to pursue a livelihood and
- protection for children against exploitative labour practices and work that is hazardous to their well-being.

It is important to interpret all labour legislation in light of the Constitution.

Section 23 of the Constitution deals specifically with labour relations, providing that everyone has the right to fair labour practices, and specifically the right

- to form and join a trade union;
- to participate in the activities and programmes of a trade union; and
- to strike

Every employer, meanwhile, has the right

- to form and join an employers’ organisation; and
- to participate in the activities and programmes of an employers’ organisation.

Every trade union and every employers’ organisation has the right

- to determine its own administration, programmes and activities
- to organise and
- to form and join a federation

Finally, every trade union, employers’ organisation and employer has the right to engage in collective bargaining.

Section 23(1) is an unusual provision—only South Africa and Malawi expressly protect the right to fair labour practices — as it is so broad and overarching. An exact definition of fair labour practices is impossible, since this is a dynamic field of the law, rooted in socioeconomic rights. Section 23(1) refers to "everyone," encompassing far more than merely employees and workers; it also includes would-be workers, employers and juristic persons.

Section 23 is not entirely universal, however, as soldiers are excluded from its ambit insofar as they may not strike at a time of war.

The Labour Relations Act was promulgated as the "national legislation" referred to in subsections 23(5) and 23(6), which provide respectively that "national legislation may be enacted to regulate collective bargaining," and that "national legislation may recognise union security arrangements contained in collective agreements." Both subsections stipulate that, to the extent that such legislation may limit one of the rights in section 23, the limitation must comply with section 36(1), the limitations clause of the Constitution.

The current Basic Conditions of Employment Act is also designed to give effect to the right to fair labour practices. Both Acts are bolstered by the EEA, which replicates the equality clause in the Constitution in its totality, adding that one may not discriminate on the basis of human immunodeficiency virus (HIV) status.

The general guarantee of fair labour practices has far-reaching effects on the civil courts’ approach to the interpretation of the rights of parties to employment contracts.

All courts are enjoined, when applying and developing the common law, to have due regard to the spirit, purport and objects of the Bill of Rights. This calls for a reconsideration of some of the assumptions underlying the common-law contract of employment, in particular the employer's power of command and unfettered rights in respect of promotion and dismissal.

Furthermore, the labour courts’ judgments on such contentious issues as the dismissal of striking workers are subject to review by the Constitutional Court, so long as the applicants have exhausted the procedures available to them under the labour legislation.

In NUMSA v Bader Bop, the Constitutional Court overturned a decision of the Labour Appeal Court which restrictively interpreted the Labour Relations Act 1995. The court recognised the necessity of collective bargaining and bargaining councils which facilitate the establishment of trade unions. The court held that minority unions may not strike in support of demands for organisational rights reserved in the Act for majority unions.

In NEHAWU v University of Cape Town, the Constitutional Court overturned another decision of the Labour Appeal Court which restrictively interpreted the Labour Relations Act 1995. It had been argued that the term "everyone" did not include a university or a company, but the court held otherwise. Furthermore, the court ruled that, under the original section 197 of the Labour Relations Act 1995, contracts of employment transferred automatically when businesses were transferred, irrespective of the wishes of the employers.

SANDU v Minister of Defence, another Constitutional Court, case Judge O’Reagan dealt with the concept of a "worker," and held that, although the Labour Relations Act 1995 does not apply to South African National Defense Force (SANDF) members, they are still "workers" in terms of the Constitution, which protects the rights of every person in South Africa.

== Employment contract ==
=== Parties ===
==== Labour Relations Act 1995 s 200A ====
There is very little work that cannot be outsourced. Outsourcing is generally not supported by trade unions, who represent employees. If work is outsourced, the worker is an independent contractor. Political pressure was placed on government to move away from outsourcing and more towards employment.

In 2002, accordingly, a new presumption was added to the Labour Relations Act 1995, providing guidelines on when it has to be ascertained whether or not someone is an employee. This presumption was introduced as a part of significant amendments to the Labour Relations Act 1995 and the Basic Conditions of Employment Act in 2002.

The effect of this rebuttable presumption is that, if one or more of the list of factors is present, the person is presumed to be an employee unless and until the contrary is proven. Many of the factors and issues discussed by the courts in the cases above resurface again: The presumption is thus created

- if the manner in which the person works is subject to the control or direction of another person;
- if the person's hours of work are subject to the control or direction of another person;
- if, in the case of a person who works for an organisation, the person forms part of that organisation;
- if the person has worked for that other person for an average of at least forty hours per month over the last three months;
- if the person is economically dependent on the person for whom he works or renders services;
- if the person is provided with tools of trade or work equipment by the other person; and
- if the person only works for or renders services to one person.

The legislative provision has been taken by some to be merely a restatement or summary of the principles laid down by the courts with the passing of time.

Although this presumption is useful in determining whether a person is an employee or not, as it is closely linked to the principles and approaches developed by the courts, the Labour Court held, in Catlin v CCMA, that section 200A does not do away with the principle that the true nature of the relationship between the parties must be gathered from the contract between them. Section 200A is not the starting point, therefore; the court held that it is necessary to consider the provisions of the contract before applying the presumptions.

==== Duties ====
An employment relationship commences only when the parties conclude a contract of service. Prior to this, neither party has any rights against the other; they are merely a prospective employee and a prospective employer.

There are, however, two statutory exceptions to the principle that employers have no obligations to applicants for employment:

1. The EEA prohibits direct or indirect unfair discrimination against an employee or applicant for employment on the basis of race, colour, gender, sex, religion, political opinion, ethnic or social origin, sexual orientation, age, disability, religion, conscience, belief, culture, language, family responsibility, marital status or any other arbitrary ground.
2. The Labour Relations Act 1995 and the Basic Conditions of Employment Act protect both employees and persons seeking employment against discrimination for exercising rights conferred by the Acts.

== Employee ==
=== Basic employment rights ===
The Basic Conditions of Employment Act is aimed at low-income earners: those who earn less than R193,805 per annum.

No matter what the contract itself says, the Basic Conditions of Employment Act is applicable as the minimum standard that must be achieved.

The Labour Relations Act 1995 deals with strikes and unions and the like; the Basic Conditions of Employment Act is a fall back option for those vulnerable workers who are not able to unionize due to various reasons, such as the kind of work they do. Domestic and farm workers are pertinent examples in the South African context.

The purpose of the Basic Conditions of Employment Act is to advance economic development by providing basic conditions of employment.

The Basic Conditions of Employment Act also contains the definition of an employee, so that issue, discussed above, is relevant here, too. The Minister is empowered to extend the provisions of the Basic Conditions of Employment Act to non-employees in specific circumstances. Even, therefore, if a domestic worker is not considered an employee in terms of the Basic Conditions of Employment Act, the Minister may extend the provisions to her for her own protection.

=== Hours ===
A maximum of 45 hours per week is allowed to be worked. These stipulations (regarding hours) are not applicable on the following persons:

- a person that earns more than R211,596.30 per year; or
- a person in a senior management position; or
- Sales personnel, employees are required to travel in the performing of their duties, and people that can determine their own work hours.

==== Sundays ====
Payment for working on a Sunday is twice the normal wage if the employee is not expected in terms of his/her contract to work on Sundays, however if the employee is expected to work on Sundays in terms of his or her contract, the employee shall receive 1.5 times the normal wage.

==== Meal intervals ====
An employee is entitled to one hour off after 5 consecutive hours of work.

An employee's meal interval can be reduced to 30 minutes by mutual consent.

==== Maternity leave ====
An employee is entitled to four months off in total, the leave must start at least 4 weeks prior to the expected birth date, and end at least 6 weeks after the expected date of birth. It does not, however, stipulate that this is paid leave. In terms of the Unemployment Insurance Fund, when a woman is on maternity leave, she is entitled to Unemployment Insurance Fund benefits for half the time spent away. Usually the employer will pay the other half, but this is not required in the Basic Conditions of Employment Act.

==== Family-responsibility leave ====
If the employee has been working for more than four months, he is entitled to 3 days family-responsibility leave, as in the case where there has been a death in his/her immediate family. Furthermore, in case where the employees child is ill.

==== Remuneration ====
Employers must keep records of the hours worked and remuneration awarded for each employee for at least three years.

Employees are to be paid in South African currency at the place of work (unless this is altered in the contract).

Employers may not deduct money from employees unless prior consent in writing is obtained.

Regarding severance pay, in cases of retrenchments or dismissals for operational reasons, employees are entitled to one week's pay for every year worked.

==== Variations ====
The Basic Conditions of Employment Act is the very minimum standard required by employers. Employers may award more, but never less, than what is stipulated.

If an employer gives more than the minimum, he may be locked into always giving more, as he must then abide by the required annual increases, which are based on a percentage of the current pay.

An employer may vary the provisions in the contract by

- individual agreement; or
- collective agreement on an industry-wide basis.

== Discrimination law ==
Seen generally, there are three mechanisms designed to protect the individual employee:

1. protection against unfair dismissal;
2. protection against unfair labour practices; and
3. the setting of minimum conditions of employment in the Basic Conditions of Employment Act.

The fourth mechanism of protection is protection against unfair discrimination.

The Labour Relations Act 1995 was the first piece of legislation to deal with discrimination in the workplace.

The EEA also contains detailed provisions to counteract and eliminate discrimination in the workplace.

The Constitution, with its right to equality, provides an important constitutional context for employment equity. A consideration of this constitutional provision indicates that the elimination of discrimination has two bases:

- formal equality, or equality in treatment; and
- substantive equality, enshrined in the adoption of positive measures to empower previously disadvantaged groups in South African society; also known as "affirmative action."

Section 6 of the EEA contains the main thrust of the Act's prohibition against unfair discrimination. It provides that

no person may unfairly discriminate, directly or indirectly, against an employee, in any employment policy or practice, on one or more grounds, including race, gender, sex, pregnancy, marital status, family responsibility, ethnic or social origin, colour, sexual orientation, age, disability, religion, HIV status, conscience, belief, political opinion, culture, language and birth.

It is not unfair discrimination

- to take affirmative action measures consistent with the purpose of the Act; or
- to distinguish, exclude or prefer any person on the basis of an inherent requirement of a job.

Harassment of an employee is a form of unfair discrimination, and is prohibited on any of the above grounds.

Furthermore, the EEA places a positive duty on every employer to take steps to promote equal opportunity in the workplace by eliminating unfair discrimination in any employment policy or practice. In certain circumstances there may be a duty on the employer to take reasonable measures to accommodate certain groups of employees.

In this regard, the Code of Good Practice: Key Aspects of human immunodeficiency virus (HIV)/acquired immunodeficiency syndrome (AIDS) and Employment, together with the Code of Good Practice on the Employment of People with Disabilities, provides guidelines on how HIV/AIDS and disability should be dealt with and accommodated in the workplace.

This is the only legislative provision that mentions human immunodeficiency virus (HIV) status as a prohibited ground of discrimination. Its inclusion makes section 6 of the EEA even wider than section 9 of the Constitution.

Section 6 protects only an "employee," but it does not speak only of an employer; it provides that "no person" may discriminate. This is broader, and may include, inter alia, an independent pension fund or an independent medical aid scheme, or even a fellow employee.

In this regard, if an employee lodges a complaint of discrimination against another employee, and the employer does not consult in an attempt to eliminate the discrimination, the employer may be held liable.

The difference between discrimination and differentiation must always be kept in mind, as not all differentiations amount to discrimination. There may be a fair differentiation between employees on the basis, for example, of educational qualifications or experience or seniority.

Generally, differentiation will amount to discrimination if it is based on an unacceptable reason. Even if the discrimination suffered is not listed in section 6(1) of the EEA, it would amount to discrimination if, objectively, it is based on attributes and characteristics which have the potential to impair the fundamental human dignity of persons as human beings, or to affect them adversely in a comparably serious manner.

Once the employee has proven that there has been a differentiation, the EEA and Constitution provide that it is presumed to have been unfair discrimination. The employer then bears the onus of proving the differentiation to be fair.

Discrimination may be direct or indirect:

- It is direct when it is clearly and expressly based on one or more of the grounds listed in section 6 of the EEA.
- It is indirect when, although not express, discrimination occurs as a result of it, as when an employer imposes a gender-neutral criterion, such as height or weight, as a condition for employment, and this criterion indirectly has a disproportionate effect on women.

=== Harassment ===
The EEA provides that harassment amounts to "a form of unfair discrimination," and as such is prohibited. The most prevalent forms of harassment encountered in the workplace are

- sexual harassment;
- racial harassment;
- sexual-orientation harassment; and
- religious harassment.

Of these, sexual harassment is by far the most common.

==== Sexual harassment ====
The Code of Good Practice on Handling of Sexual Harassment Cases lists three types of conduct which could constitute sexual harassment:

1. physical conduct ranging from touching to sexual assault and rape, and including a strip-search by or in the presence of the opposite sex;
2. verbal conduct, including innuendoes, suggestions and hints, sexual advances, comments with sexual overtones, sex-related jokes or insults, graphic comments about a person's body (made to that person or in her presence), enquiries about a person's sex life, and even whistling at a person or a group of persons; and
3. non-verbal conduct, including gestures, indecent exposure or the display of sexually explicit pictures or objects.

===== Other remedies =====
The employee who resigns due to sexual harassment may argue that this was a constructive dismissal, which would provide grounds for finding an automatically unfair dismissal.

A victim of harassment may institute a civil claim, based on delict, against the perpetrator; she may also institute a claim against the employer, based on the common-law principles of vicarious liability.

==== Medical testing ====
The EEA prohibits medical testing of an employee, unless

- legislation requires or permits such testing; or
- the testing is justifiable.

===== HIV/AIDS =====
The EEA lists HIV status as one of the grounds on which an employee may not be discriminated against.

In Hoffman v South African Airways, the court found that people living with HIV constitute a minority, to which society has responded with intense prejudice, stigmatization and marginalization. Society's response has forced many of them not to reveal their HIV status, for fear of such prejudice, and has thus deprived them of the help they would otherwise have received. This stigmatization the court considered an assault on their dignity.

Employers may make HIV testing available to employees as part of a "wellness" program, provided that it takes place confidentially and on the basis of informed consent. Authorisation from the Labour Court is not required for such testing.

==== Affirmative Action ====
Alongside the prohibition against unfair discrimination, affirmative action is the second cornerstone of the EEA.

According to section 2(b) of the EEA, the goal of affirmative action is to ensure the equitable representation of certain groups in all occupational categories and levels in the workplace.

===== Designated employers =====
The prohibition of unfair discrimination applies to all employers, regardless of their size, but the affirmative-action provisions of the EEA apply only to "designated employers."

A "designated employer" is defined as follows:

- an employer who employs fifty or more employees; or
- an employer who employs fewer than fifty employees but whose annual turnover in any given year exceeds a certain level, like an employer in agriculture with a total annual turnover of R2,000,000;
- municipalities;
- organs of state; or
- an employer appointed as a designated employer in terms of a collective agreement.

Employers that do not fall within the ambit of this definition may still voluntarily indicate that they intend to comply with the Act.

===== Employment-equity plans =====
The employment-equity plan is the centrepiece of the procedure for implementing affirmative action in the workplace.

A designated employer has to consult with the workforce on

- the conduct of an analysis of its employment policies, practices and procedures, as well as the working environment;
- the preparation and implementation of an employment-equity plan, which will achieve reasonable progress towards employment equity in the workforce; and
- the submission of reports to the Department of Labour.

The analysis described above must also contain a profile of the employer's workforce. Using this profile, the employer must determine the degree of under-representation of people from designated groups in the various categories and levels.

The employment-equity plan must include

- annual objectives;
- the affirmative-action measures that have to be implemented;
- annual timetables for the achievement of goals;
- the duration of the plan; and
- internal procedures to resolve disputes about the interpretation or implementation of the plan.

== Job security ==
=== Common law ===
The common law afforded the employee virtually no protection against unfair dismissal. Before the Labour Relations Act (LRA), as long as the employer gave the required period of notice, dismissal or probation was acceptable. The common law focused only on the lawfulness of the employment contract itself; the reason for the dismissal was irrelevant. The employer was not required to give the employee an explanation for the termination; nor was there any requirement that the dismissal be fair.

=== Labour Relations Act ===
The Labour Relations Act gives regulates and gives effect to the following, which includes but is not limited to: to give effect to section 27 of the Constitution; to regulate the organisational rights of trade unions; to promote and facilitate collective bargaining at the workplace and at sectoral level; to regulate the right to strike and the recourse to lockout in conformity with the Constitution; to promote employee participation in decision-making through the establishment of workplace forums; to provide simple procedures for the resolution of labour disputes through statutory conciliation, mediation and arbitration. Furthermore, provides for the right not to be unfairly dismissed or subjected to unfair labour practices.

1. Is the worker an employee? (Only employees may be dismissed, and only employees enjoy the protection of the Labour Relations Act.)
2. Has there been a dismissal? (To answer this question, one must look to section 186(1) of the Labour Relations Act.)
3. Is the dismissal substantively or procedurally unfair? (In this regard, the reason for the dismissal will be a decisive factor.)

The employee has the onus to establish that there has in fact been a dismissal. If this is discharged, the onus shifts to the employer, who prove the fairness of the dismissal.

"Dismissal" is the termination of the employment relationship by the employer, with or without notice. It can also entail

- that the employee reasonably expected the employer to renew a fixed-term contract of employment on the same or similar terms, but the employer offered to renew it on less favourable terms, or did not renew it at all; or
- that the employer refused to allow the employee to resume work after she took maternity leave in terms of any law or collective agreement, or in terms of her contract of employment.

An employer who has dismissed a number of employees for the same or similar reasons, but who now offers to re-employ one or more of them, while refusing to re-employ another, will have dismissed the latter.

The statutory definition also recognises as constituting dismissal certain circumstances in which the employee terminates the employment relationship. This is known as constructive dismissal.

Where, for example, an employee terminates a contract of employment, with or without notice, because the employer has made continued employment intolerable for him, he will have been constructively dismissed.

An employee may also be regarded as having been constructively dismissed if he terminates a contract of employment, with or without notice, because his new employer, after a transfer of the business as a going concern, provided him with conditions or circumstances at work which are substantially less favourable than those provided by his former employer.

== Collective labour law ==
Collective labour law concerns the relationship between employers and employees acting through trade unions and employers' organisations. Matters concerning the rights of employees are regulated by legislation such as the Labour Relations Act 1995 (LRA). The creation and alteration of terms and conditions of employment, known as "interest issues", are instead left to the parties to settle through collective bargaining. The LRA defines a trade union as an association of employees whose principal purpose is to regulate relations between employees and employers. It also provides for the registration of unions and employers' organisations, creates bargaining councils and statutory councils, and regulates organisational rights, strikes and lock-outs.

The Industrial Conciliation Act 1924, passed after the 1922 unrest on the Witwatersrand, was the first South African legislation to regulate strikes. It provided for the registration of white trade unions and employers' organisations and set up collective bargaining through industrial councils and conciliation boards. The resulting racially divided system lasted until the early 1980s, when the government appointed the Wiehahn Commission in 1977 to examine existing labour legislation. After the Constitution entrenched the right to bargain collectively, a commission chaired by Halton Cheadle prepared the draft that became the LRA.

Section 23 of the Constitution protects the right to form and join a trade union, to strike, and to engage in collective bargaining, and permits legislation recognising union security arrangements contained in collective agreements. Section 64(1) of the LRA gives every employee the right to strike and every employer recourse to a lock-out. The final Constitution, unlike the interim Constitution of 1993, does not expressly protect the right to lock out.

== See also ==
- Black Economic Empowerment – South-African government policy
- Labour Court of South Africa – South African court that handles labour law cases
- Labour Appeal Court of South Africa – South-African court
- Constitutional Court of South Africa – Supreme court of South Africa
- South African company law – Regulates corporations formed under the Companies Act
- South African contract law – Law about agreements between two or more parties
- United Kingdom labour law

=== Cases ===
- David Crouch Marketing v Du Plessis (2009) 30 ILJ 1828 (LC); [2009] JOL 23835 (LC).
- Food and Allied Workers Union and Another v The Cold Chain (C324/06) [2007] ZALC 17 (8 March 2007).
- Fuel Retailers Association of SA v Motor Industry Bargaining Council (J2612/00) [2001] ZALC 46 (28 March 2001).
- Independent Municipal and Allied Trade Union v Rustenburg Transitional Council (J1543/98) [1999] ZALC 145; (2000) 21 ILJ 377 (LC) (17 September 1999).
- Kroukam v SA Airlink (JA3/2003) [2005] ZALAC 5; [2005] 12 ILJ 2153 (LAC) (26 September 2005).
- Murray v Minister of Defence 2009 (3) SA 130 (SCA).
- Pressma Services (Pty) Ltd v Schuttler and Another 1990 (2) SA 411 (C).
- SA Post Office Ltd v Mampeule [2009] 8 BLLR 792 (LC).
- Sindane v Prestige Cleaning Services [2009] 12 BLLR 1249 (LC).
- South African National Defence Union v Minister of Defence (CCT27/98) [1999] ZACC 7; 1999 (4) SA 469; 1999 (6) BCLR 615; (1999) ILJ 2265 (CC) (26 May 1999).
- South African National Defence Union v Minister of Defence and Others (CCT65/06) [2007] ZACC 10; 2007 (5) SA 400; 2007 (8) BCLR 863 (CC); [2007] 9 BLLR 785 (CC); (2007) 28 ILJ 1909 (CC) (30 May 2007).
- UPUSA v Komming Knitting [1997] 4 BLLR 508 (CCMA).
- Wallach v Lew Geffen Estates CC 1993 (3) SA 258 (A).

=== Legislation ===
- Native Building Workers Act, 1951.
- Industrial Conciliation Act, 1956.
