= Industrial Conciliation Act, 1924 =

South African law

The Industrial Conciliation Act 1924 was an act of the Parliament of South Africa, which was intended to channel industrial disputes by negotiating machinery. Employees were allowed to form trade unions, which would be approved, recognized, and registered. They could then be represented on industrial councils. A process of conciliation was established and required to be followed before a strike was permitted. Workers "regulated by any Native Pass Laws and regulations" (black workers) were excluded from the definition of workers and so not permitted to join a union.
