= F. H. Grosskopf =

South African judge

The Honourable F. H. Grosskopf

Judge of the Supreme Court of Appeal
- In office 1 May 1989 – 2001

Judge of the Transvaal Provincial Division
- In office 1 November 1980 – 30 April 1989

Personal details
- Education: University of Pretoria; Rijksuniversiteit Leiden

Frans Heinrich Grosskopf was a South African judge who served in the Supreme Court of Appeal between 1989 and 2001. Formerly an advocate in Pretoria, he joined the bench in 1980 as a judge of the Transvaal Provincial Division.

== Life and career ==
Grosskopf studied at the University of Pretoria, where he completed a BA and LLB. In 1960 he additionally completed a Doctor of Laws at the Rijksuniversiteit Leiden in the Netherlands. He entered legal practice as an advocate in Pretoria in 1961 and took silk in 1977. He was additionally a law lecturer at the University of Pretoria between 1960 and 1966, a member of the South African Law Commission between 1977 and 1981, and chairman of the Pretoria Bar in 1980.

On 1 November 1980, he became a judge of the Transvaal Provincial Division of the Supreme Court of South Africa. He was elevated to the Appellate Division with effect from 1 May 1989. He remained in the appellate court after it was reconfigured as the Supreme Court of Appeal in 1997, retiring in 2001.
