= Willem Heath =

South African judge (1945–2024)

Head of the Special Investigating Unit
- In office 29 November 2011 – 14 December 2011
- President: Jacob Zuma
- Preceded by: Willie Hofmeyr
- Succeeded by: Vas Soni
- In office 1996–2001
- President: Nelson Mandela; Thabo Mbeki
- Preceded by: Unit established
- Succeeded by: Willie Hofmeyr

Judge of the Supreme Court
- In office 1 March 1988 – 29 May 2001
- Division: Transvaal Provincial Division

Personal details
- Born: Willem Hendrik Heath; 13 January 1945 Boksburg, Transvaal; Union of South Africa
- Died: 9 October 2024 (aged 79) Cape Town, South Africa
- Education: University of Pretoria

Willem Hendrik Heath (13 January 1945 – 9 October 2024) was a South African lawyer and judge who was the inaugural head of the Special Investigating Unit between 1996 and 2001. He was appointed as a judge of the Supreme Court of South Africa in 1988 but resigned in 2001 to enter the private sector. Thereafter he founded Heath Executive Consultants, a legal consultancy and forensic investigations firm.

== Early life and education ==
Heath was born in Boksburg on 13 January 1945. He studied law at the University of Pretoria, completing a Bachelor of Arts in 1966 and a Bachelor of Laws in 1968.

== Legal and judicial career ==
=== Sitting judge: 1988–2001 ===
Heath began his career as a public prosecutor and later entered private practice as an advocate in Pretoria. In 1988, he was appointed as a judge of the Transvaal Provincial Division of the Supreme Court of South Africa, but he sat on secondment in the Ciskei Supreme Court, which had its seat in Bhisho in the Ciskei bantustan. His notable judgments included S v Ncanywa, an authoritative opinion on marital rape. He remained on the bench after the end of apartheid in 1994, and between 1995 and 1997 he chaired a major commission of inquiry, the so-called Heath Commission, into corruption and maladministration in the Eastern Cape Province.

When the commission closed, President Nelson Mandela appointed Heath as the inaugural head of the Special Investigating Unit (SIU), a specialized anti-corruption law enforcement unit. The unit recovered over R1.5 billion in assets during its first year in operation, and Heath was named the Johannesburg Press Club's Newsmaker of the Year in 1999. As SIU head, he was known for his aptitude for public relations, but he also clashed with politicians of the governing African National Congress (ANC) – notably with Penuell Maduna, who became Minister of Justice and Constitutional Development after Thabo Mbeki succeeded Mandela as president in 1999. The tensions were partly attributed to Heath's efforts to investigate ANC involvement in the Arms Deal. Political commentator Richard Calland later chided Heath for having "blundered about trying to play politics."

In November 2000, the Constitutional Court of South Africa ruled unanimously that Heath's leadership of the SIU was inconsistent with the Constitution, because it violated the separation of powers to have a sitting judge oversee the SIU's investigative functions. Although the court granted Heath a one-year grace period while the government sought his successor, Heath took long leave from 1 February 2001. Explaining that "I would feel uncomfortable returning to the judiciary" after six years off the bench, he asked Mbeki to discharge him from the remainder of his judicial service. When Mbeki refused, he announced his resignation from the bench – meaning that he could leave the bench but would not receive retirement benefits.

After Heath's resignation took effect on 1 July 2001, Mbeki appointed Willie Hofmeyr to replace him as head of a restructured SIU. Fifteen years later, Heath sued to recover his judicial retirement benefits, challenging the rationality of Mbeki's decision to deny him discharge; the application was dismissed in the Western Cape High Court in December 2017.

=== Consultant: 2001–2011 ===
Upon his resignation from the bench, Heath said that he would start a private legal consultancy and forensic investigations firm in Cape Town, "pointing out loopholes and advising clients how to avoid committing crime in running their businesses." He and his youngest son, Marius, founded Heath Executive Consultants, which rose to prominence partly for its work on behalf of mining magnates Roger Kebble and Brett Kebble.

In addition, in 2005, Heath announced that he had been hired by former deputy president Jacob Zuma, President Mbeki's primary political rival, to advise Zuma on the merits of pending corruption charges against him. Opposition politician Sheila Camerer suggested that the Kebbles might be paying Heath's fees on Zuma's behalf. Heath became a voluble critic of the prosecution in the press. Later, after Zuma succeeded Mbeki as president in the 2009 general election, Heath was appointed as a special adviser to Zuma's Minister of Justice, Jeff Radebe.

=== Return to the SIU: 2011 ===
On 29 November 2011, President Zuma announced that he had decided to restore Heath to his former position as head of the SIU. Heath replaced Willie Hofmeyr, who had retained the position since 2001, with immediate effect. However, days after the appointment, Heath gave a controversial interview to the City Press, in which he accused former president Mbeki of having commandeered the National Prosecuting Authority to pursue corruption and rape charges against Zuma, as well as to pursue fraud charges against Zuma's allies Schabir Shaik and Tony Yengeni. Mbeki said that his remarks were malicious and libelous, and Helen Zille, the leader of the opposition Democratic Alliance, argued that the remarks showed that Heath was unsuitable for the SIU post because he "has involved himself in factional ANC politics."

On 14 December 2011, two weeks after his appointment, Heath tendered his resignation from the SIU. He said in a statement:

The events of the past two weeks have created the impression that I am unable to head the SIU independently. Correct or not, the initial media coverage of an interview in which I participated left the impression that I made unqualified statements of political events which may be unbecoming of the head of the SIU.

Minister Radebe appointed Nomgcobo Jiba to replace Heath in an acting capacity, though a permanent replacement was not made until Vas Soni was appointed in August 2013.

== Personal life and death ==
Heath was married to Marita Heath. He died on 9 October 2024, aged 79, in Cape Town. His memorial was held at the Stellenberg Dutch Reformed Church in Durbanville, Cape Town.
