= Willie Hofmeyr =

South African prosecutor

Member of the National Assembly
- In office May 1994 – June 1999

Personal details
- Born: 22 November 1954 (age 71) Cape Town, Cape Province; Union of South Africa
- Citizenship: South Africa
- Party: African National Congress
- Education: University of Cape Town

William Andrew "Willie" Hofmeyr (born 22 November 1954) is a South African lawyer and former politician who was Deputy National Director of Public Prosecutions from 2001 to 2019. He was the founding head of the National Prosecuting Authority's Asset Forfeiture Unit from 1999 to 2011 and the head of the Special Investigating Unit from 2001 to 2011. Although he was removed from the AFU by Shaun Abrahams in 2015, he returned in 2019 before he retired late that year.

Hofmeyr was an activist with the United Democratic Front during apartheid and was admitted as an advocate of the High Court in 1991. He represented the African National Congress (ANC) in the National Assembly from 1994 to 1999, during which time he served as parliamentary counsellor to Deputy President Thabo Mbeki from 1998. He received extensive public attention as a prosecutor due to his role in politically sensitive prosecutions.

== Early life and activism ==
Hofmeyr was born on 22 November 1954 in Cape Town in the former Cape Province. He is Afrikaans. He matriculated at Nassau High School in Mowbray and served his compulsory military service in the Transvaal, where he said he experienced "hardcore racism" for the first time and became politically "radicalised". Upon leaving the army, he enrolled at the University of Cape Town, completing a bachelor's in economics in 1976. While an undergraduate, he was involved in anti-apartheid student politics, particularly through the National Union of South African Students (NUSAS). He was a member of the executive committee of NUSAS Wages Commission, as well as a member of the editorial board of Abasebenzi, and in that capacity assisted in union organising in Cape Town. He was arrested on several occasions – both for distributing banned literature and for participating in illegal protests – and he was subject to a state banning order under the Suppression of Communism Act from 1976 to 1981.

He also studied for postgraduate degrees at the University of Cape Town, receiving a master's in economic history in 1984 and an LLB in 1989. His research focused on the ANC's attempts to organise farmworkers in the Western Cape during the Great Depression. At the same time, he remained active in the anti-apartheid movement, particularly in producing research and popular literature for the trade unions and as a member of the United Democratic Front (UDF), which he joined at its founding meeting in 1983. He rose quickly through the ranks of the UDF, becoming its coordinator for Cape Town Central by 1986, and he was a member of its regional executive in the Western Cape from 1987 until the organised disbanded in 1991. He was sentenced to house arrest in 1988 and then arrested and held in solitary confinement for six months. After his release, he successfully sued the government for unlawful detention and won R50,000 in damages. Another period of detention the following year ended after he participated for 28 days in a nationwide hunger strike of political prisoners.

In 1990, Hofmeyr was one of the UDF members recruited to organise the rally that welcomed Nelson Mandela after his release from prison. After the African National Congress (ANC) was unbanned later in 1990, Hofmeyr served on the ANC's Western Cape regional executive from 1991 to 1994. During that time, in 1991, he was admitted as an advocate of the High Court of South Africa. From 1993 to 1994, he worked full time as a coordinator for the ANC's campaign in the 1994 general election, which would be South Africa's first under universal suffrage.

== Parliament: 1994–1999 ==
In the April 1994 election, Hofmeyr was elected to a seat on the new National Assembly, standing on the ANC's national party list. He served a single term in Parliament, leaving after the 1999 general election. During that time, Hofmeyr was a member of the Portfolio Committee on Justice, where, after chairman Johnny de Lange, he was the ANC's ranking member; the Mail & Guardian said that he was "responsible for bringing out the ANC heavy artillery" in transitional justice and criminal reform debates with opposition parties.

From 1994 to 1996, he was also a member of the fifth theme committee in the Constitutional Assembly that drafted South Africa's post-apartheid constitution; the fifth theme committee dealt with the judiciary and legal system, including prosecuting authorities. On the morning that the final draft was adopted, following last-minute negotiations, Hofmeyr famously said, "No one is really happy with this, but the fact that we are all a little unhappy should make everyone a little happier." From 1998 to 1999, he served as parliamentary counsellor to Deputy President Thabo Mbeki.

== National Prosecuting Authority: 1999–2019 ==
=== Mbeki and Motlanthe presidencies: 1999–2009 ===
Mbeki was elected as President of South Africa in the 1999 election and in May he appointed Hofmeyr as a Special Director of Public Prosecutions at the National Prosecuting Authority (NPA). Hofmeyr's mandate was to establish and lead the new Asset Forfeiture Unit (AFU) within the framework of the Prevention of Organised Crime Act. In May 2001, Mbeki promoted him to Deputy National Director of Public Prosecutions (NDPP); he served under NDPP Bulelani Ngcuka and at the same time retained his post as the head of the AFU. Weeks later, in July 2001, he was appointed – in addition to his two other posts – to head the NDPP's Special Investigating Unit (SIU).

==== Disbanding of the Scorpions: 2008–2009 ====
At the ANC's 52nd National Conference in December 2007, Mbeki was replaced as ANC president by Jacob Zuma, who ran partly on a platform of disbanding the Scorpions, a specialised anti-corruption unit of the NPA. Although Hofmeyr opposed that policy, he played a key role in implementing it: under Mbeki's successor as national President, Kgalema Motlanthe, he was involved in drafting the relevant legislation and overseeing the transition to the new Directorate for Priority Crime Investigation, commonly known as the Hawks, a weaker anti-corruption unit located under the South African Police Service. Speculating about how Hofmeyr's role could be reconciled with his opposition to the policy, the Mail & Guardian pointed out that Hofmeyr used his influence in the process to lobby for the retentions of the Scorpions' investigative model; it observed that "Hofmeyr may not be someone to compromise his principles, but compromise is one of his principles". Hofmeyr was also touted as a likely candidate for appointment as head of the Hawks, though he was not ultimately appointed.

==== The spy tapes: 2009 ====
At the tail end of Motlanthe's presidency, Hofmeyr was involved in the NPA's controversial decision, announced in April 2009, to drop corruption charges against ANC president Zuma. It was common cause among the press that Hofmeyr supported dropping the charges while another respected prosecutor, Billy Downer, advocated for pursuing them. In his capacity as Deputy NDPP, Hofmeyr was appointed to study the so-called Spy Tapes, secret audio recordings that Zuma's lawyers claimed revealed political collusion in Zuma's prosecution, and he advised the acting NDPP, Mokotedi Mpshe, to drop the charges. Announcing the decision, Hofmeyr said, "It was simply not possible for us to proceed given the manipulation of the [prosecutorial] process."

The Mail & Guardian supposed that Hofmeyr might have been aiming to broker "a compromise that will let Zuma off the hook while saving the NPA from further bashing and embarrassment" in the best interests of the NPA's survival, though the newspaper also pointed out that Hofmeyr might have been protecting his own political interests, given his presumed candidacy for the top job at the Hawks. Hofmeyr continued to defend the decision for years after, maintaining his position that there had been political interference in Zuma's prosecution: in a 2015 affidavit, he alleged that former NDPP Ngcuka, former Scorpions head Leonard McCarthy, and former intelligence minister Ronnie Kasrils had been "part of a broader collective of Mbeki supporters who viewed the NPA as a tool to fight Mbeki’s political battles". He wrote:

I argued that the prosecution should be discontinued. I had investigated Zuma’s allegations. In my view, they proved that McCarthy and Ngcuka had actively abused the NPA to discredit Zuma... McCarthy did, in fact, manipulate the timing of the institution of the prosecution against Zuma for political reasons. He did so because he, and others close to Mbeki and opposed to Zuma, believed that delaying the prosecution would harm Zuma's attempts to compete against Mbeki for the position of ANC president.

In 2019, however, Hofmeyr told an inquiry that he regretted the decision and had "overreact[ed]" to credible allegations that, in 2008, there had been political interference in Jackie Selebi's corruption trial. He said:

I accept that I made a mistake by attaching so much value to the integrity of the NPA and not sufficient weight to the evidence on the criminal case. I will live with that regret for a very long time.

=== Zuma presidency: 2009–2018 ===
==== Removal from the SIU: 2011 ====
In 2010, shortly after Zuma's election as national President, new NDPP Menzi Simelane announced a plan to restructure the NPA, which included dismantling Hofmeyr's AFU. Weeks later, Simelane said that the relevant clause was "an unfortunate drafting error"; it was reported that Justice Minister Jeff Radebe had intervened to save Hofmeyr's job.

In July 2011, the NPA announced that Hofmeyr was under investigation by the police in connection with alleged misappropriation of SIU funds in improperly awarded tenders. Hofmeyr was quoted as saying, "It is to be expected that there will be efforts to discredit those dealing with serious corruption, and this has happened in the past. One just has to be tough enough to deal with it when it happens". Journalists, civil society organisations, and opposition parties all expressed concern about the NPA's announcement, especially because the SIU had announced in March that it was actively investigating 16 public agencies, including the police department; the Democratic Alliance suspected that the investigation had a "sinister motive".

The investigation did not lead to any concrete charges but, in November 2011, Zuma announced that he had removed Hofmeyr as head of the SIU, in order to "ease the pressure" on him as he continued in his roles as Deputy NDPP and head of the AFU. AmaBhungane said that Zuma and his supporters were suspicious of Hofmeyr because of his influence in the NPA, because of his association with a group of ex-Scorpions, Gerrie Nel among them, and because he was "seen as having changed since once too often" in ANC's factional politics, especially given that he was formerly viewed as "Mbeki's man".

==== Removal from the AFU: 2015 ====
In August 2015, recently appointed NDPP Shaun Abrahams removed Hofmeyr from the AFU and transferred him to the legal affairs division, a move viewed as a demotion. He remained a deputy NDPP in his new post. In early 2016, Hofmeyr provided evidence in a court case which sought to remove Nomgcobo Jiba from her position as deputy NDPP; in an affidavit, he alleged that Jiba frequently acted "in support of political groupings" and that Abrahams – still his boss – had displayed "a systematic pattern of protecting Ms. Jiba and others improperly... suggest[ing] that he has chosen to align himself with their agenda".

Also in 2016, Hofmeyr was shortlisted for appointment to succeed Thuli Madonsela as Public Protector. He was dropped when the shortlist was condensed in August.

=== Ramaphosa presidency: 2018–2019 ===
In April 2019, after Shamila Batohi was appointed to succeed Abrahams as NDPP, Hofmeyr was returned to his previous post as head of the AFU. He retired in November of that year. At that point he was the longest-serving of the NPA's four Deputy NDPPs.

In 2023, Minister of Trade and Industry Ebrahim Patel appointed Hofmeyr to a one-year term as one of four members of the board at the National Lotteries Commission.
