= Schabir Shaik trial =

2004 corruption trial in South Africa

The Schabir Shaik trial was an important court trial in post-apartheid South Africa. The case, tried in the Durban and Coast Local Division of the High Court before Judge Hilary Squires, established a fraudulent and corrupt relationship between Durban-based businessman Schabir Shaik and former South African leader Jacob Zuma.

Shaik's writing off of Zuma's significant personal loans in 1999 had raised suspicions about their financial activities. After Shaik's brother, Chippy Shaik, was suspended from the Department of Defence for his involvement in the 1999 Arms Deal, Schabir Shaik was arrested in 2001 for the possession of secret documents, after which investigators found that he was involved in corrupt dealings with Zuma as well as fraud. He was brought to trial in October 2004, pleading not guilty. After Shaik's petition of appeal to the Supreme Court of Appeal failed he started to serve his sentence of 15 years on 9 November 2006.

Shaik's trial was the subject of intense media attention due to the involvement of several high-profile members of the South African government. Though Shaik claimed that his financial dealings were legitimate, on 30 May 2005, the Durban High Court handed down its final judgment. He was pronounced guilty of corruption for paying Zuma 1.2 million Rand (US$185,000) to further their relationship and for soliciting a bribe from the French arms company Thomson-CSF, now Thales, as well as guilty of fraud for writing off more than R1 million (US$154,000) of Zuma's unpaid debts.

Judge Squires sentenced Shaik to two terms of 15 years for corruption and one term of 3 years for fraud, to be served concurrently. Following the decision, Zuma stepped down from his seat in Parliament, though he remained deputy president of the African National Congress at that time. Thabo Mbeki, the standing President, sacked Zuma as his deputy. Zuma was later elected as the president of the ANC.

Shaik then attempted an appeal at the Supreme Court of Appeal. However, all five judges under President Craig Howie unanimously rejected his appeal, and agreed the correct sentence had been given over a year prior.^{[31]}

== Zuma's return from exile ==
When apartheid ended, many former exiled African National Congress (ANC) leaders returned home to financially ruined lives, such as Jacob Zuma, one of the most important Zulu ANC members.^{[1]} Appointed MEC for Economic Affairs and Tourism in KwaZulu-Natal in May 1994^{[2]} by the new ANC government, he thought that he needed much more than his salary from that position to make up for the time he spent fighting.

Schabir Shaik, a member of the wealthy and important Shaik family of Durban, proved to be important in reestablishing Zuma's life. They had a profitable and discreet business relationship, which was only visible in a few unusual and incomplete documents and contracts, most of which were undated, and some were signed in the wrong places. Almost every document dealt with interest-free loans with no specified date of repayment. In 1999, Shaik wrote all the loans off without any explanation.

Shaik, who was Zuma's financial advisor at the time, knew that Zuma could never afford to repay the sum of the loans on his salary.^{[4]} He also knew, since he had access to all of Zuma's financial records, about unpaid home loans, an overdraft of 66,500 Rand (US$10,200) in an account with Nedbank, one of South Africa's largest banks, another debt owed to Wesbank, and more money borrowed but not owed yet to Permanent Bank and Standard Bank.^{[5]} He knew that every month Zuma spent more money than his salary, and that he was writing bad cheques and failing to meet debit card payments. Shaik did not expect to be paid back, however, as he was buying influence with Zuma, which was used to win government contracts for his company, Nkobi Holdings.

Through a series of share transactions, Nkobi Holdings merged with the French company Thomson-CSF, one of the largest arms companies in the world. On 21 May 1996, Thomson Holdings, the name of the newly merged corporations and now a South African company, was established.^{[6]} The first joint ventures Thomson made bids for were not for arms: instead, they made bids for an upgrade to Durban International Airport, a new ID Card for South African citizens, expansions to the N3 and N4, a new mobile phone network, and new smart card technologies.^{[7]}

== Arms deal ==
Thomson Holdings, through its South African subsidiary, was seeking influence in government circles in this period, as the change from the National Party government to the ANC government had left it with few influential friends.^{[8]} To get an arms contract, it would need strong political backing. Fortunately for Shaik, his brother, Chippy, was in charge of arms acquisition at the Department of Defence.^{[9]} Chippy indicated that he would facilitate matters for Thomson Holdings if its 'position' regarding Chippy and his friends proved acceptable. Otherwise, he would make things difficult.^{[10]}

The international end of the company also invested in the arms deal by buying shares of African Defence Systems, a bidder for one of the lucrative contracts in the arms deal. This bid excluded Nkobi Holdings, which was a shareholder of Thomson-CSF in South Africa—to Shaik's great consternation. In June 1996, Shaik held a meeting to tell his directors that they must gear up to bid for the electronic defence system needed to guide and protect South Africa's newly acquired corvettes.^{[11]} Shaik said that he would use his political connections to facilitate the contracts and tenders, because at that point both Shaik and Zuma were confident that Zuma would be made Deputy President in the post-Mandela government.^{[12]} Zuma was given more loans to facilitate the deal for Shaik and to help Nkobi receive more government contracts.^{[13]}

The first newspaper article hinting at the relationship between Zuma and Shaik appeared at this time; however, it was insignificant. Published in the Cape Times, it was squeezed in between a report about a gangster gunned down in Cape Town and a car accident that claimed the lives of three people. Later, this article was considered the first mention of the case, although in January 1997 it was a brief news story:

'The police are investigating the circumstances surrounding the theft of classified military documents during an armed robbery at the home of Shamin 'Chippy' Shaik, which were in his car. The suspects were reported to have fled with Shaik's wallet, watch, and briefcase, which contained the documents. Shaik was not injured. Nobody was arrested.'^{[14]}

Meanwhile, Shaik and Zuma wanted to establish a new venture, Nkobi Bank, to act as financial advisor to a bidding consortium on any large-scale public- or private-sector project.^{[15]} The bank would also compete for government and various ministry budgets as a deposit taker. Zuma was appointed as Deputy President in June 1999, and he began consolidating his assets, influence, and bank accounts.^{[16]}

He started by developing his traditional residential village estate at Nkandla in Zululand in the rural northern part of KwaZulu-Natal.^{[17]} A contractor estimated the construction on the estate at R2.4 million (US$370,000), excluding VAT. Zuma negotiated with the contractor, and the final price was reduced to R1.3 million (US$200,000). Zuma was promised that construction would take six months, but it took nine.^{[18]} The money for the construction was not paid by Zuma himself; instead it was paid in installments by Bohlabela Wheels, Fakude PZN, and some in cash by Durban businessman Vivien Reddy, both in person by him and on one of his company's cheques.^{[19]}

== Nkandla development and selling influence ==
To finance the continued construction on his estate, Zuma took out a bond, which "Reddy signed as … guarantor for R400,000 [US$60,000]." To continue his influence on Zuma, Reddy also paid the instalments on the bond, which came to nearly R12,000 (US$1,800) a month.^{[20]} Despite the regular monetary inflow, Zuma's financial troubles continued due to unforeseen costs in the Nkandla development. Zuma decided, therefore, to sell his political influence. Alan Thétard, then one of Thomson-CSF's directors, met with Schabir Shaik in Durban on 30 September 1999, during the course of which it was agreed that Thétard would give Shaik money to cover Zuma's debts in exchange for Zuma's protection from the commission investigating the arms deal, and ongoing support for any future Thomson-CSF deals with the South African government.^{[22]}

During subsequent negotiations over the latter part of 1999, Shaik and Thétard agreed to a bribe amount of R1 million (US$154,000), and at a meeting in March 2000, Thétard, Shaik, and Zuma finalised the exchange.^{[14]} At this point, Zuma was in desperate need for money as the bribe was going to cover the continued construction of his Nkandla development, yet Thétard has not transferred any money to Shaik thus far. Shaik demanded an immediate response to this "extremely delicate matter" from Thétard,^{[24]} but Thétard failed to respond and by 19 October, Shaik in his role as Zuma's financial advisor, attempted to stop all construction on Nkandla, prompting Zuma to tell his contractors to ignore Shaik's orders. Zuma wrote a cheque for R1 million to his contractors, the payment of which was stopped by Shaik.^{[25]}

By late 2000, Shaik knew that the South African Revenue Service (SARS) and the Scorpions would be watching all financial transactions made between him and Zuma, so the international division of Thomson-CSF sent an encrypted fax to Nkobi Holdings detailing a "service provider agreement" which updated the contract signed between Nkobi Holdings and Thomson-CSF for the delivery of the Corvettes. This agreement was used to disguise the payment of the bribe.^{[26]} The fax, which was later obtained in a raid on Shaik's office by the Scorpions, contained a non-bribery clause next to which Shaik wrote "conflicts with intention", yet despite the careful set-up, Thomson-CSF did not transfer any money to Shaik. Subsequently, Zuma went to meet with Thétard in Paris, following which R250,000 (US$38,000) was transferred by Thomson-CSF to the "Jacob Zuma Education Fund".

As the year progressed, the relationship between Shaik and Zuma had attracted more attention, and by October 2000, South Africa's leading corruption prosecutor, Judge Willem Heath, formally asked President Thabo Mbeki for a proclamation allowing him to investigate the arms deal.^{[27]} Zuma immediately attacked the petition by writing a letter to Gavin Woods, the chairperson of the Parliamentary Standing Committee on Public Accounts (Scopa). This letter, written in Zuma's capacity as "Leader of Government Business" in Parliament states that:

Furthermore, we are convinced that ... there is no need for the 'Heath Unit' to be involved in any 'investigation' of the defence acquisition. We hope this strange manner of proceeding was not driven by a determination to find the Executive guilty at all costs, based on the assumption we have already mentioned, that the Executive is prone to corruption and dishonesty

— Steven Lang(SABCNews.com)

== Trial ==
Schabir Shaik's trial started amid intense media circus in the Durban High Court. Shaik pleaded not guilty to charges of corruption and fraud on 10 October 2004. He asserted in his plea explanation that the State had misunderstood his dealings with Zuma. He agreed that there was a financial relationship between Zuma and him, but that it was not a corrupt one as the payments he made to Zuma were loans made in friendship. He did not ask for any interest in the loans because it "offended his religious convictions". The loans had been made on a revolving credit agreement. He also denied allegations of fraud, saying money was mistakenly written off in his company's books, but that this was later fixed. To allegations that he was involved in soliciting a bribe for Zuma, he replied that he knew nothing.

In lead prosecutor Billy Downer's opening address, he said his case would be based on facts and patterns and that "we will principally be talking of the arms deal." The first charge against Shaik was one of general corruption. In their efforts to prove this charge, the State led a number of witnesses to show, as explained by Downer, that Zuma was "on retainer for Shaik."

=== First charge: Corruption ===
The State argued in its first charge of corruption that Shaik had paid Zuma R1.2 million (US$185,000) to further a "general corrupt relationship." To prove this charge, the State gave evidence of all the financial transactions between Shaik and Zuma. The State's first witness for this charge was Shaik's former secretary, Bianca Singh, who gave testimony while accompanied by three bodyguards. She stated that "Zuma was quite close to Shaik. They would speak on the phone and he would come to visit." She also testified that Shaik arranged financial affairs for Zuma, managed his bank accounts on the computer, and discussed his financial situation with him. She concluded by saying that she knew that Shaik said the word Zuma often because she often overheard him while he was on the phone.

The State's next witness was KPMG forensic auditor Johan van der Walt, who testified for several hours that the payments made by Shaik to Zuma "sometimes threatened the financial existence of the whole group." He continued that the payments were not sensible for any other purpose than to buy influence with Zuma. Shaik's lawyers argued in cross-examination that their own forensic auditor showed that payments to Zuma were only a small percentage of the group's turnover. Van der Walt replied that "one can have a billion rand turnover and still have an overdraft. If you don't have the money, you can't operate." Van der Walt also stated that Zuma lived well beyond his means, but seemed to accept that other people would pay his debts.

Shaik's counsel, François van Zyl, said Shaik would testify that as far as he knew, Zuma had by now paid all his creditors and should have no problem paying him back. Van der Walt replied that whether the money paid to Zuma was a loan or a donation, he reaped the benefits: "My review indicated that Zuma had no access to major funds to repay his debts. The repayments must have taken place outside the period of review." Van Zyl produced a written revolving credit agreement between Shaik and Zuma of which, he said, Parliament was informed. The State said it would dispute its authenticity. Van Zyl also accused Van der Walt of not taking into account that Zuma had repaid some money to Shaik.

Ian McLeod, credit manager at Absa Group Limited, one of South Africa's largest banks, said that neither Shaik nor Zuma mentioned the agreement when they were asked to make a list of their assets and liabilities. From what he saw, he said that he "doubted very much if Zuma could repay Shaik." Tracy O'Brian told the court that she sublet a flat to Shaik. Shaik told her that it was for his financial director. She later discovered, however, that when there were complaints about bodyguards with guns, Zuma lived there. Although Shaik or one of his companies paid the rent, it was always late. She terminated the lease.

Abdool Qadir Mangerah said that he was a close friend of Zuma. He loaned Zuma R154,000 (US$24,000), and when Zuma could not pay him back, Shaik did. A balance of R4,000 (US$600) was still outstanding. He said that he helped Zuma out of friendship and gave him interest-free loans just like Shaik claimed he did. All Mangerah expected in return was "prays for [his] good health."

The State alleged, however, that several things were done in return. A former business associate of Shaik, Professor Themba Sono, told the court that Shaik told business partners that the Nkobi group could bring "political connectivity" to the table. Shaik said what he meant by political connectivity was Black Economic Empowerment (BEE). Professor John Lennon of Caledonian University in Glasgow told the court that Zuma advised him to use Nkobi as the South African partner for a proposed eco-tourism school. When Lennon seemed hesitant, Shaik threatened to derail the proposal and tell Zuma. A feasibility study for the project was cancelled after the government of the United Kingdom refused an application for funding. Shaik denied that he had anything to do with the sudden decline of the project. He said that his "unfortunate" correspondence with Lennon was prompted by his reaction to being "sidelined."

Zuma intervened when Thomson was hesitant to take Nkobi on as its BEE partner because Mbeki allegedly told them that he had reservations about Shaik and his business ventures. Van der Walt said Zuma intervened in sorting out Nkobi's shareholding in ADS, a company strategically placed to get a multimillion-rand contract in the arms deal. Van Zyl countered that both Mbeki and Mandela were involved in attempts to negotiate a BEE settlement for ADS.

When the Malaysian Renong Group wanted local partners for a Durban development, Zuma proposed Shaik's involvement. Another Absa official testified that Shaik and Zuma were considered a "package deal" when the bank invited Zuma to become a private banking client.

At the end of the testimonies for the first charge, Downer pointed out they need not prove that Zuma did anything out of the ordinary to help Shaik as "you can corrupt a politician by paying him to do something he is paid to do every day."

=== Second charge: Fraud ===
The State proved in this charge that Shaik had more than R1 million (US$154,000) written off. Shaik owed this money to companies in the Nkobi group, and included payments made to Zuma. The write-off meant that it disappeared from Nkobi's books. Shaik said that it was a mistake and that he had his auditors fix it in subsequent financial years. Van der Walt said that it did not matter that it was fixed, as it was still a crime, asserting that "you can fix the amounts, but not the irregularity." He said Shaik stood to benefit most from the write-off. He also added that the fact that an auditor was advising him did not reduce his liability as director.

Shaik told the court that the company's auditors and financial director Colin Isaacs took full responsibility for the financial side of operations, that he was sure that the accounting books were in order, and that when he became aware of the problem he had it corrected. He had no intention to commit fraud.

Auditing clerk Anthony Reed said he was instructed by Ahmed Paruk to effect the write-off. Paruk said he was instructed by Shaik to do it. He said Shaik told him that there was "no way in which he owed that type of money to his companies".

Former Nkobi accountant Celia Bester said that the money written off was cash bribes paid to "various ministers" by Shaik. The writing-off, she said, was the main trigger for her final resignation. She told Judge Squires that she "saw it purely as bribe money".

=== Third charge: Corruption ===
For the second charge of corruption against Shaik, the State proved that Shaik had solicited a bribe from French arms company Thomson for Zuma. Zuma agreed to protect Thomson in return.

As evidence for the charge, Van der Walt said there were clear signs that an "informal corrupt" process was followed, apart from the formal process when South Africa's multibillion-rand arms deal was concluded. Government auditor James Edward van Heerden, who did a special review of the arms acquisition process, also concluded that there were deviations from the accepted arms acquisition practices, with no plausible explanation. He told the court that their conclusions were that there should be a special investigation or forensic audit focusing on the involvement of contractors and subcontractors in the deal.

The most controversial document produced by the State was a fax ostensibly setting out a bribe agreement between Shaik, Zuma, and Alain Thétard regarding the March 2000 meeting and R1 million (US$154,000) payment to Zuma. Both the handwritten fax and a disk with a typed copy were handed to the Scorpions by Thétard's former secretary, Sue Delique. Her evidence was backed up by forensic computer expert Bennie Labuschagne and handwriting expert Marius Rehder.

Delique told the court that she was asked to type the note and fax it in encrypted form to Paris. After she resigned she told Thomson's auditors at the time, Gary Parker and David Read, about it. She refused to give them the documents. She told the court that she did not fax the agreement to Shaik. In response, Shaik testified that he "had nothing to do with Thomson in 2000".

Parker and Read concluded at the end that she was a disgruntled employee. They found no proof of what she told them in Thomson's financial statements, and then dropped the matter. Shaik admitted that there was a meeting between himself, Thétard, and Zuma. But he said it was about a donation for the Jacob Zuma Education Trust.

Singh told the court that an audibly agitated Shaik had phoned her from the golf course to tell her to tape hearings by the parliamentary standing committee on public accounts when Chippy Shaik was being questioned about the arms deal. She said he told her the next day that they were "focusing on the wrong person". Singh also said that she overheard Shaik calling Zuma the next day. According to her he said: "Hello my brother, Hello JZ. Chippy is under pressure. We really need your help to land this deal." He later asked her to come to Mauritius with him to meet Thétard.

Singh testified that at that meeting Shaik said they had to discuss "damage control." And he said if the Heath Investigation Unit continued to probe the arms deal and if a certain ANC member opened his mouth "they would be in big trouble." Shortly afterwards the alleged bribe agreement was concluded. Van der Walt said he found a great deal of correspondence about the payment of the money and a service provider agreement that Shaik concluded were used to mask the bribe. Only one payment was made of R250,000 (US$38,000); however, nothing was done to enforce the so-called "service provider agreement."

Shaik denied any attempt to bribe Zuma for protection and told the court that he did not know why Thétard wrote the note setting out the bribe agreement. He also testified that what the State thought was correspondence about the bribe was really about the donation to the education trust. Shaik said that the trust was in financial difficulty in 2000 and the donation was urgently required for them to be in a position to give bursaries for the next year. But Gerhardus Pretorius, who managed the Jacob Zuma Education Trust at the time, told the court that nobody ever told him of a significant donation expected from Thomson. Theunis Benemere, involved in the day-to-day administration of the trust, said that "there was always enough money".

Former Judge Willem Heath told the court his unit was confident it would be included in the multi-agency probe into the arms deal. His unit was the most dangerous by far if there was evidence of corruption as it had the power to have the deal cancelled on "public interest" grounds. Heath said he was baffled when Mbeki refused to allow them to investigate. He said "I have no doubt that if objective consideration was applied the President would have no choice but to issue a proclamation". Heath's two former right-hand men, Gerhard Visagie and Jannie Lubbe, echoed his sentiments.

The president of the Independent Democrats, Patricia de Lille, told the court she was handed information by people whose identity she did not disclose. She first asked for a commission of inquiry into the arms deal. When that was refused she asked Mbeki to issue a proclamation to allow the Heath unit to investigate. She said that her "role was to pass on the information and hope and pray that it will be investigated. I was ostracised, but I did it for the people of the country. I wanted to assist government to root out the few bad apples." She was accused by Van Zyl of using the arms deal to attack the ANC, but she retorted that her "attack was on corruption."

Gavin Woods, who headed Parliament's Committee on Public Accounts (Scopa), told the court that they wanted a thorough investigation of the arms deal. It would have included their own investigation as well as one by four agencies including the Heath Special Investigating Unit. He received a letter from Zuma, written in his capacity as leader of government business, saying that government saw no need for the Heath Unit to be involved. At the time, Woods said there was no clarity on what it was the "leader of government business" was supposed to do. Under cross-examination he conceded that the director of public prosecutions, the auditor-general and the public protector also wanted Heath excluded.

Zuma said that when he was asked in Parliament if the revelations at the Shaik trial were a blot on the moral regeneration programme headed by him, he replied, "not at all, I don't look at it that way. Not at all, honourable members."

== Squires' judgment ==
The Defence rested its case on 7 April 2005, which was followed by the State's final arguments on 28 April. Judge Squires said that he would not be prepared to give any judgment before 30 May. In his final statements, Judge Squires thanked the defence and the prosecutor for the "meticulous and careful manner" in which they "presented their cases", which he said made the "court's task easier," especially when seen in the light of the difficult and complex nature of the case. The formal part of the trial ended shortly after the defence counsel asked the court to consider the possibility that Shaik had sought a bribe of R500,000 (US$77,000) a year from Thompson-CSF without Zuma's knowledge. The defence stated, however, that this version should only be considered if the court rejected their original argument.

Judge Squires reconvened the court on 7 June to deliver his sentence. Describing corruption as a "pervasive and insidious evil," he found that Shaik's actions had been aimed at advancing his business interests through an association with Zuma:

"His corporate empire's progress and prosperity was plainly linked to the possibility that Jacob Zuma would finally ascend to the highest political office. What was important to him was the achievement of a large multi-corporate business group ... And the power that goes with that and close association with the greatest in the land. It is precisely in such circumstances that corruption works".

Judge Squires also said that he was convinced that Shaik gave Zuma "a sustained level of support" designed to maintain a lifestyle the politician could never have afforded otherwise, and that this was an investment in Zuma's political profile from which Shaik expected to benefit. Judge Squires continued that the payments "were not ... to a low-salaried bureaucrat seduced into temptation," and that the higher the status of the beneficiary, the more serious the offence.

Judge Squires found Shaik guilty of a generally corrupt relationship with Zuma and for soliciting a bribe for Zuma from Thomson-CSF. He was also found guilty of fraud for irregularly writing off loans from the books of Nkobi Group.

Judge Squires dismissed Shaik's anti-apartheid "struggle credentials", saying what he had sought to achieve was exactly the same as the apartheid regime's "command of the economy" by a privileged few, which is exactly what the struggle had sought to replace. The judge sentenced Shaik to the minimum prescribed sentence of 15 years on each of the corruption counts. Shaik was sentenced to three years for fraud; however, Judge Squires said he found mitigating circumstances for not imposing the same minimum penalty for the fraud charge, as Shaik had not been the instigator and the crime had no adverse effect on any other party.

Judge Squires ordered that the three sentences run concurrently and described Shaik as a man with commendable vision, ambition, and energy, but one who appears to have lost his moral compass and scruples. The judge also imposed a series of fines on 10 companies related to the Nkobi Group.

Concluding the sentencing proceedings, Squires said:

"I do not think I am overstating anything when I say that this phenomenon [of corruption] can truly be likened to a cancer eating away remorselessly at the fabric of corporate privacy and extending its baleful effect into all aspects of administrative functions, whether state official or private sector manager. If it is not checked, it becomes systemic. And the after-effects of systemic corruption can quite readily extend to the corrosion of any confidence in the integrity of anyone who has a duty to discharge, especially a duty to discharge to the public."

"One can hopefully discount the prospect of it happening in this country, but it is that sort of increasing disaffection which leads and has led on other parts of our continent and elsewhere to coups d'état or the rise of populace leaders who in turn manipulate politics for even greater private benefit ... This is the last step in a thousand mile journey."

Shaik immediately announced his intentions to appeal the sentence, and Judge Squires set aside 26 July as the date of a hearing for Shaik's leave to appeal.

== Fallout ==
The political nature of the trial prompted immediate reactions from all sides of the political and economic spectrum in South Africa. Non-ANC-aligned parties immediately praised the verdict as it weakened the moral position of the ANC. Groups hostile to the ANC immediately demanded that Zuma be charged with corruption as well.

The leader of the United Democratic Movement, Bantu Holomisa, issued a press release strongly in favour of charging Zuma. He stated that "we [the UDM] hope that this was merely phase one of the prosecution process: Schabir Shaik has been prosecuted as the corruptor. Phase two must necessarily be to prosecute the corruptee. It would be an embarrassment for the country to have a serving deputy president arrested and prosecuted. Therefore, President Mbeki must fire Mr Zuma if he does not resign". The press report concluded by saying that the 15-year jail sentence was confirmation that South African society would not tolerate those who were guilty of corruption.

Democratic Alliance MP Sheila Camerer echoed Holomisa's sentiments: "The DA [Democratic Alliance] has maintained since August 2003 that the deputy president ... should have been charged with Shaik. We believe he should be charged now in view of Judge Squires' finding that he was complicit in both counts of corruption". Independent Democrats leader Patricia de Lille also said the sentence should prove a deterrent: "Schabir Shaik has been handed the justice all South Africans needed to hear and that this should prove as a deterrent for anyone in the future. We should all celebrate the restoration of faith in our country by the local and international community with this judgement."

The Congress of South African Trade Unions (Cosatu), the most powerful trade union federation in South Africa, openly supported Zuma. However, its spokesman, Paul Notyhawa, said that it respected the court's decision: "We definitely have to respect the court's decision in the matter, noting that the accused has reserved his right to appeal". Notyhawa said that Cosatu had never objected to the trial of Shaik, but he went on to say that "what we object to is that the judge erred in implicating a person who has not been part of the proceedings and has been denied his right to respond in a proper forum".

The majority of the press called for Zuma to resign. Under intense pressure from within the ANC as well as the public, Zuma's spokesperson Lakela Kaunda announced on 14 June 2005 that Zuma would resign his seat in parliament. The ANC issued a statement later in the day accepting Zuma's resignation. Kaunda further explained that Zuma would stop his activities in parliament the next day and would write a letter to the speaker to inform her of his decision, clarifying that "the bottom line is that you won't see him [Zuma] in parliament again, at least not as a member".

The ANC's statement read that it "respects the position taken by Deputy President Zuma to resign as a member of parliament". Zuma, in response to the ANC, said that "President Thabo Mbeki has taken a decision regarding my presence in government and cabinet. It is the president's prerogative to take such a decision, in the context of, and within his authority as the president of the republic in light of this decision. I have also offered to resign my seat in parliament not as an admission of guilt of any kind, but to make it easier for the ANC and government to function in parliament." According to the statement, Zuma planned to stay on as deputy president of the ANC. Cosatu immediately reacted negatively to Zuma's resignation, prompting protests and calls for Zuma to be reinstated, although they represented a minority of the South African public.

Zuma was charged with corruption as a result of the trial, although he continued to enjoy support from leftist and Zulu elements of the ANC. His support did appear to decline significantly (but not entirely collapse) after being charged with an unrelated rape case late in 2005, which led to him suspending his activities within the ANC.

== Appeal ==
=== Supreme Court of Appeal ===
Judge Squires granted Shaik the right to an appeal in the Supreme Court of Appeal in Bloemfontein against his fraud and one of his corruption convictions. After being granted his reprieve, Shaik told reporters in a press conference that he was grateful and intended to use the options made available to him. He concluded the press conference by stating that "obviously one would have liked to be victorious on all the charges, but we are in the legal process".

Many reporters asked him if he would petition the Chief Justice to appeal the convictions that Judge Squires denied grounds of appeal, to which Shaik replied that his legal team was considering the matter. The National Prosecuting Authority, as represented by spokesperson Makhosini Nkosi in front of the courthouse, said that it accepted Judge Squires' decision, despite some disappointment. Nkosi also said that "We [the NPA] are satisfied that the judge applied his mind correctly to all the facts. In some cases, we are naturally disappointed, but even then you appreciate the reasons for coming to that decision".

Judge Squires extended Shaik's R100,000 (US$15,000) bail. It took more than a year for the Supreme Court of Appeal Court to pass a ruling on the two appeals as well as the application from Shaiks' legal team for leave of appeal on the second corruption charge (which Squires had declined to award).

However, on 6 November 2006, President Craig Howie on a bench of 5 judges, rejected this right to appeal. The appeal judges found that Shaik was correctly convicted on three charges of corruption and that the sentence was fair. Furthermore, the court found that Shaik's actions went against the very fibre of the constitution.^{[32]} Shaik reported to jail to start serving his effective 15-year sentence. On 3 March 2009, Shaik was released on medical parole, after serving two years and four months of his 15-year prison term.

=== Constitutional Court ===
Mr Shaik applied for leave to appeal to the Constitutional Court in Johannesburg, against his conviction and sentence, and consequential steps. In October 2007 the Court dismissed most elements of the application, finding that most of the grounds for appeal submitted by Shaik had no prospect of success. However, it granted leave to appeal against the order for confiscation of his assets.

Shaik and his companies (Nkobi Holdings and Nkobi Investments) then appealed to the Constitutional Court to question the validity of the confiscation order regarding R33 million of their assets. The original court authorised the confiscation under the Prevention of Organised Crime Act (POCA), since it held that they constitute proceeds of crime. In April 2008 the Constitutional Court dismissed this appeal, finding that Shaik and his companies had received their shareholdings in Thint, a major ground for the asset forfeiture order, as a result of "the corrupt payments" made to Zuma, and that the remainder of the order related to dividends that accrued due to this shareholding.

The court ruled that POCA permitted that all benefits that had arisen from the commission of a crime, whether directly or indirectly, may be confiscated by the trial court after it convicted an accused; and that the trial court had discretion to determine the appropriate amount in any given case. The court concluded that Shaik and his companies had not shown that the High Court improperly exercised its discretion to determine the amount to be confiscated nor that the order confiscating both the shareholding and the dividend was "disturbingly inappropriate".

== References in popular culture ==
In November 2006 the South African comic strip Madam & Eve ran a series of strips lampooning Shaik's arrival in prison.

== Footnotes ==
1. ^{a} Department of Foreign Affairs: Tribute to South Africa's Minister of Foreign Affairs
2. ^{a} ANC: Jacob Gedleyihlekisa Zuma
3. ^{a} News24: Shaik Clan Ready for Verdict
4. ^{a} News24: Zuma Lived the Expensive Life
5. ^{a} High Court of South Africa: Summary of Substantial Facts in Terms of Section 144(3)(a) of Act 51 of 1977
6. ^{a} Institute for Justice and Reconciliation: Economic Transformation News
7. ^{a} Sunday Times
8. ^{a} The Star: The Story of the State v Schabir Shaik and Others
9. ^{a} SAPA: Chippy Shaik's Name Dropped at Brother's Trial
10. ^{a} IPO Africa: Shaik faces 2004 high court trial
11. ^{a} Sunday Times: How the case against Shaik implicates deputy president
12. ^{a} SABC News: Shaik thought political connections would help: witness
13. ^{a} iAfrica: Zuma Lawyer Contradicts Loan Evidence
14. ^{a} ^{b} The Star: The story of the State v Schabir Shaik and others
15. ^{a} Business in Africa: Mortgaging a Nation
16. ^{a} IPO Africa: The State Versus Schabir Shaik
17. ^{a} News24: MEC to testify in Shaik trial
18. ^{a} SABC News: Shaik cross-examination enters day three
19. ^{a} Sunday Times: Cosatu stands by Zuma's right to fair treatment
20. ^{a} The Herald: Zuma’s jewel village ‘built with bribes’
21. ^{a} Mail & Guardian: Scorpions Probe Jacob Zuma
22. ^{a} AllAfrica.com: Corruption Trial Pressures Mbeki, Facing G8 Summit, to Fire Deputy
23. ^{a} SABC News: Friday – 29 October 2004 – Open ended loans
24. ^{a} The Star: How he was found guilty – Part five
25. ^{a} News24: Full transcript of Shaik judgment
26. ^{a} News24: Shaik hints at French witness
27. ^{a} World Socialist Web Site: Arms corruption scandal erupts in South Africa
28. ^{a} SABC News: Highlights of last weeks of 2004
29. ^{a} iAfrica: De Lille testifies at Shaik trial
30. ^{a} BBC News: The rise and fall of Tony Yengeni
31. ^{a} SAPA (9 November 2006). "Shaik reports for jail term". News24.
32. ^{a} Maughan, K & Gifford, G (6 November 2006). "Shaik, Zuma deals 'against the Constitution". News24.
