= Andrea Johnson =

South African advocate (born 1970)

- Education: University of Durban-Westville
- Occupation: Advocate
- Employer: National Prosecuting Authority
- Known for: Head of the Investigating Directorate Against Corruption

Andrea Johnson (born 24 August 1970) is a South African advocate and prosecutor who served as the head of the Investigating Directorate Against Corruption (IDAC), a specialised anti-corruption directorate within the National Prosecuting Authority (NPA). She was appointed by President Cyril Ramaphosa with effect from 1 March 2022 to succeed Advocate Hermione Cronje as head of the Investigating Directorate.

In 2026, Johnson became the subject of public scrutiny after appearing before the Judicial Commission of Inquiry into Criminality, Political Interference and Corruption in the Criminal Justice System, Madlanga Commission, where allegations were made concerning her conduct while serving as head of IDAC. She denied wrongdoing and resigned as Investigating Director in July 2026.

== Early life and education ==
Johnson attended Roseville Secondary School in Umzinto, KwaZulu-Natal province of South Africa. She obtained a B Iuris degree in 1993 and an LLB degree in 1995 from the University of Durban-Westville. In 2007 she completed a Diploma in Criminal Justice and Forensic Auditing.

== Career ==
Johnson joined the prosecutorial service in 1996. She prosecuted matters in district, regional, and high courts before joining the Directorate of Special Operations (Scorpions) in 1999.

During her time with the Scorpions she worked on investigations involving organiszd crime, commercial crime, and corruption. She formed part of prosecution teams involved in several high-profile matters, including investigations involving Brett Kebble,the disgraced former police chief Jackie Selebi, Solly Lazarus and the prosecution of Oscar Pistorius.

Following the disbandment of the Scorpions, Johnson continued her career within the National Prosecuting Authority. She later served as Acting Special Director of the Priority Crimes Litigation Unit and coordinated the NPA Organised Crime Component.

== Head of the Investigating Directorate ==
On 28 February 2022 President Cyril Ramaphosa announced Johnson's appointment as Head of the Investigating Directorate of the National Prosecuting Authority. According to The Presidency, she was appointed following the recommendation of National Director of Public Prosecutions Shamila Batohi and brought more than 25 years of prosecutorial experience to the role. The Investigating Directorate was responsible for investigating and prosecuting serious corruption, organized crime, and offenses arising from allegations of state capture. In 2024, legislative amendments established the permanent Investigating Directorate Against Corruption (IDAC), with Johnson continuing as its head.

== Madlanga Commission ==
In 2026, Johnson appeared before the Madlanga Commission, a Judicial Commission of Inquiry into Criminality, Political Interference, and Corruption in the Criminal Justice System, chaired by Acting Deputy Chief Justice Mbuyiseli Madlanga. The Commission heard evidence from former Crime Intelligence official Colonel Kobus Roelofse, who alleged that Johnson had disclosed confidential information concerning an assault investigation involving Major General Feroz Khan before investigators had interviewed him. Roelofse further alleged that Johnson intervened in matters involving Khan and frustrated certain investigations. These allegations formed part of the evidence presented to the commission and had not been judicially determined.

During her testimony, Johnson denied improperly interfering in investigations or attempting to shield Khan from criminal prosecution. She testified that she had acted lawfully throughout her tenure and rejected suggestions that she had abused her office. Johnson acknowledged before the Commission that she and Khan had maintained a close personal relationship over several years. In one of their chats on WhatsApp, Khan calls Johnson " Hi gorgeous . Johnson described their relationship as a "very deep" one and confirmed that they had communicated frequently outside official duties. She denied, however, that the relationship had influenced prosecutorial decisions or the work of the Investigating Directorate. Johnson further testified that she distanced herself from Khan after allegations concerning his conduct emerged.

While giving evidence, Johnson invoked her constitutional right against self-incrimination in response to some questions after being informed that the National Prosecuting Authority was considering whether criminal proceedings might be instituted against her. She nevertheless continued to answer questions on other aspects of her tenure.

The commission also heard evidence concerning decisions relating to investigations into alleged corruption within Crime Intelligence and the handling of dockets involving senior police officials. Johnson was further implicated by Drushanta Ramsamy for lying to the commission and covering up.

== Resignation ==
On 27 July 2026, President Cyril Ramaphosa accepted Johnson's request to vacate the office of Investigating Director with immediate effect.

== Personal life ==
Johnson is married to Junaid Johnson, who works in South Africa's Crime Intelligence division.

== See also ==
- National Prosecuting Authority
- Directorate of Special Operations
- Corruption in South Africa
