= Hermione Cronje =

South African lawyer

- Born: Hermione Theresa Cronje; 1970 or 1971 (age 55–56); Cape Town, South Africa
- Education: University of Cape Town; Harvard Kennedy School
- Occupations: Lawyer; prosecutor; advocate
- Known for: Inaugural head of the Investigating Directorate (2019–2022)

Hermione Theresa Cronje is a South African lawyer and former prosecutor. She was the inaugural head of the National Prosecuting Authority's Investigating Directorate (ID) from May 2019 to February 2022.

== Early life and education ==
Cronje was born in 1970 or 1971. She grew up on the Cape Flats of Cape Town. Among other places, her family spent time in Atlantis, Elsies River and Athlone. After finishing high school, she attended the University of Cape Town, where she was the first black woman to serve as president of the student representative council. She completed a BA in 1993 and an LLB in 1996. 15 years later, while working as a prosecutor, she resumed her education at the Harvard Kennedy School, where she obtained an MPA in 2010. She was admitted as an advocate of the High Court of South Africa in 2000.

== Legal career ==
=== National Prosecuting Authority: 1998–2012 ===
Cronje worked for the National Prosecuting Authority (NPA) continuously from 1998 to 2012. She entered as an assistant to the National Director of Public Prosecutions (NDPP), Bulelani Ngcuka, and in that capacity she was involved in establishing the NPA's investigating directorates for serious economic offences and organised crime respectively. She became a founding member of the NPA's Asset Forfeiture Unit in 1999, and she went on to serve ten years as the head of the unit's Western Cape branch. In that capacity she worked under Willie Hofmeyr, and her notable cases included the confiscation application in Schabir Shaik's criminal trial. During her last year at the NPA, she helped establish the government's multi-agency Anti-Corruption Task Team.

=== Cape Bar: 2012–2019 ===
In 2012, Cronje left the NPA to work in private practice at the Cape Bar. From 2013 onwards, she was an expert consultant to the Stolen Assets Recovery Initiative, a joint international asset recovery initiative of the World Bank and United Nations Office on Drugs and Crime (UNODC). In that capacity, she advised asset recovery and anti-corruption units in various countries; she worked for several years on establishing and assisting the Tanzanian prosecuting authority's Asset Forfeiture and Recovery Section. In addition, she was the author of a 2017 UNODC study on the management of confiscated assets.

=== Investigating Directorate: 2019–2021 ===
In 2019, Cronje was recruited by the incumbent NDPP, Shamila Batohi, to consult on the design of the NPA's Investigating Directorate (ID), which was to be established inside the NDPP's office with a mandate to investigate and prosecute corruption and related offences. On 17 May 2019, President Cyril Ramaphosa announced that he had appointed Cronje to become the ID's inaugural director. Her appointment received a broad welcome, including from Corruption Watch.

She was appointed to a five-year term beginning on 15 May 2019. However, in December 2021, she announced her premature resignation from the ID. The Sunday Times reported that her decision to leave was rumoured to stem from frustration at a skills shortage within the NPA that prevented the organisation from pursuing major state capture prosecutions, while the Daily Maverick suggested that a lack of political will had presented a similar obstacle. There were also rumours that her relationship with Batohi had deteriorated as a result of this frustration. Batohi denied these rumours. The Sunday Times later published a leaked copy of Cronje's resignation letter, in which she referred to the toll of the job on her health and family.

She remained at the ID until 1 March 2022, when she was replaced by Andrea Johnson. From 1 June that year, she worked part-time in the legal unit of Open Secrets, a non-profit organisation run by activist Hennie van Vuuren. In November 2023, press quoted her despairing of a "skills catastrophe" in the NPA.

== Personal life ==
Cronje is married and has two children. During her first year at the ID, she commuted between Pretoria and Cape Town, where her children attended school.
