= Matshela Koko =

South African businessman

- Born: Matshela Moses Koko
- Citizenship: South African
- Education: University of Cape Town
- Employer: Eskom (1996–2018)

Matshela Moses Koko is a South African engineer and business executive. He is best known for his tenure as a senior executive at Eskom between 2014 and 2018. During that time, he was Eskom's acting chief executive officer from 2016 to 2017. The Zondo Commission implicated him in the Gupta family's capture of Eskom.

== Early life and education ==
Koko obtained a Bachelor of Science in chemical engineering at the University of Cape Town.

== Career at Eskom: 1996–2018 ==
In September 1996, he joined Eskom as an engineer-in-training at the Duvha Power Station in Witbank, Mpumalanga. Remaining at Duvha for the next eight years, he was appointed as engineer for pressure parts and boiler plants in 2000. In 2004, he moved to Eskom headquarters, becoming senior manager for power plant engineering in the enterprises division. He moved to Eskom's generation division in 2009 as the division's senior manager for engineering. The following year, he was appointed as the divisional executive for group technology. In 2014, when his technology division merged with the commercial division, he became group executive for technology and commercial.

In March 2015, Koko was one of four Eskom executives who were suspended pending an internal inquiry into maladministration at the utility; the chairperson of Eskom's board, Zola Tsotsi, told the press that Koko's division was "rotten" and that Koko was resisting a forensic inquiry into possible corruption in the division. The details of the ensuing internal inquiry, which was led by Dentons, were not made public, but Koko was reinstated.

In late October 2015, newly appointed Eskom CEO Brian Molefe announced that Koko had been appointed as group executive for generation at Eskom. During the year that followed, the incumbent Minister of Energy, Tina Joemat-Pettersson, pursued controversial plans for further investment in nuclear energy generation; Koko was viewed as "pro-nuclear". Also during this period, Koko's generation division came under scrutiny for controversial coal procurement deals that were alleged to favour the politically connected Gupta family. In October 2016, the Public Protector, Thuli Madonsela, published a report on state capture entitled State of Capture, which identified the coal deals as potentially unlawful and corrupt.

Molefe resigned from Eskom as a result of the State of Capture report. On 30 November 2016, the Minister of Public Enterprises, Lynne Brown, announced that she would appoint Koko to replace him as acting Eskom CEO with effect from 1 December. Under his leadership, Eskom issued requests for proposals in its bid to procure 9.6 gigawatts of nuclear power. However, Koko was replaced as acting CEO in mid-2017 when he was subject to internal disciplinary charges. The charges arose from revelations that his stepdaughter's company had done over R1 billion in business with Eskom.

The disciplinary inquiry exonerated Koko, and he returned to work on 8 January 2018, though he was not returned as acting CEO; instead, he returned to his permanent position as head of generation. The National Union of Metalworkers of South Africa said that the disciplinary process was "a mockery and an insult to all those who believe in good corporate governance" and that by reinstating Koko, "The Eskom board is clearly showing the people of South Africa the middle finger". Through January, Koko faced mounting pressure to resign from Eskom, and at the end of the month, a newly appointed Eskom board announced that it had given Koko an ultimatum, telling him that he would be fired if he did not resign within 24 hours.

However, Koko lodged an urgent application in the Labour Court of South Africa, seeking to block his dismissal. Eskom promptly reversed itself, withdrawing the ultimatum and instead instituting fresh disciplinary charges against him. Two of the new charges related to Eskom's Trillian–McKinsey deal, and the other two charges related to Koko's personal dealings with the Gupta family. Koko was suspended again pending the conclusion of the new disciplinary inquiry. The new disciplinary tribunal met only once before, on 14 February 2018, President Jacob Zuma resigned from office; within two days, Koko had tendered his own resignation from Eskom.

== Corruption charges: 2022–2024 ==
In March 2019, the Sunday Times broke the first in a series of stories alleging that a corrupt relationship existed between Koko and Swiss ABB, which was awarded a R2.2-billion contract for the construction of the Kusile Power Station. Over three years later, in October 2022, Koko and several others – including his wife and two stepdaughters – were arrested and brought up on related charges. However, the National Prosecuting Authority (NPA) suffered extensive delays in preparing for trial and requested multiple postponements.

In November 2023, the Specialised Commercial Crimes Court in Middelburg, Mpumalanga struck the case from the roll. Citing the accused's right to a speedy trial, the court ordered that the case could not be reinstated without the written authorisation of the National Director of Public Prosecutions, Shamila Batohi. Commentators criticised the NPA's Investigating Directorate for having "bungled" the prosecution.

== Other corruption allegations ==
=== Areva contract at Koeberg ===
In 2014, Eskom signed a controversial R5-billion contract to refurbish steam generators at Koeberg Nuclear Power Station, awarding the tender to French Areva. A competing bidder, Japanese–American Westinghouse, challenged the award in court, claiming that it had been made improperly. In particular, Westinghouse alleged in court papers that divisional executive Koko and acting Eskom CEO Collin Matjila had intervened in the procurement process in a manner that suggested they were "intent on having the award made in favour of Areva". However, in December 2016 in Areva v Eskom, the Constitutional Court of South Africa ruled in Eskom's favour, upholding the contract.

=== Tegeta transactions ===
The Zondo Commission recommended that Koko should face criminal prosecution for his role in the transactions that allowed Tegeta Exploration and Resources, a Gupta-owned firm, to acquire the Optimum coal mine using Eskom funds. The commission's report described Koko as being among the Eskom executives who were "Gupta agents who were prepared to do the Guptas’ bidding when required to do so".

== Personal life ==
He is married to Mosima Koko.
