= Hoffmeyer =

Hoffmeyer is a surname. Notable people with the surname include:

- Bob Hoffmeyer (born 1955), Canadian ice hockey player
- Dave Hoffmeyer (born 1955), American soccer player
- Jesper Hoffmeyer (born 1942), Danish biologist
- Niels Henrik Cordulus Hoffmeyer (1836–1884), Danish meteorologist

== See also ==
- Hoffmeier
