= Hofmeier =

Hofmeier is a surname of German origin, being a variant of the surname Hofmeyer. Notable people with the surname include:

- Markus Hofmeier (1993), German footballer
- Max Hofmeier (1854-1927), German gynecologist

== See also ==
- Winterhalder & Hofmeier, a German clock manufacturing company
- Hofmeyr (surname)
- Hoffmeier
- Homeier
