= Hofmeyr (surname) =

Hofmeyr is a surname. Notable people with the surname include:

- Genevieve Hofmeyr, South African film producer
- Gray Hofmeyr (born 1949), South African film and television director
- Gys Hofmeyr (1871–1942), South African civil servant and the first Administrator of South West Africa
- Hendrik Hofmeyr (born 1957), South African composer
- Isabel Hofmeyr (born 1953), South African academic
- Jan Hofmeyr (disambiguation), multiple people
- Murray Hofmeyr (1925–2018), South African rugby union player and cricketer
- Steve Hofmeyr (born 1964), South African singer, songwriter and actor
- Willie Hofmeyr (born 1954), South African lawyer and politician
