= Shamila Batohi =

South African prosecutor

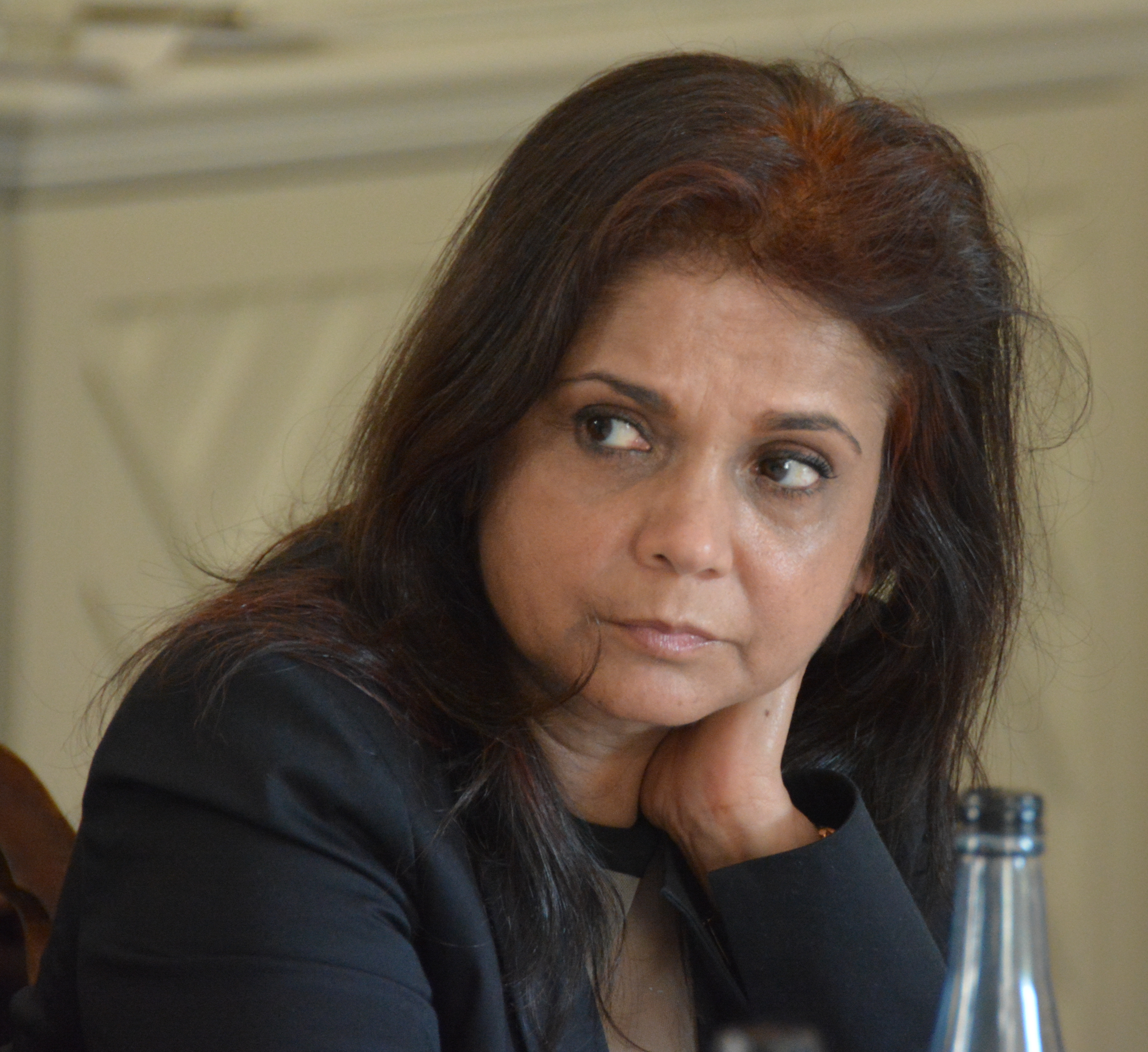
- Batohi in 2016

National Director of Public Prosecutions
- Incumbent
- Assumed office 1 February 2019
- President: Cyril Ramaphosa
- Preceded by: Shaun Abrahams

Personal details
- Born: January 1961 (age 65) Durban, South Africa
- Education: University of Durban–Westville; University of Natal

Shamila Batohi (born January 1961) is a South African prosecutor. She led the National Prosecuting Authority as National Director of Public Prosecutions (NDPP) from February 2019 to February 2026. She was formerly an adviser to the Prosecutor of the International Criminal Court from 2009 to 2019. She replaced as NDPP by advocate Andy Mothibi from 1 February 2026, upon her retirement.

== Early life and education ==
Batohi was born in Durban in the former Natal Province. She grew up in Clare Estate, an Indian suburb of Durban, and she matriculated at Burnwood Secondary School. After high school, she completed a BA at the University of Durban–Westville and an LLB at the University of Natal's Durban campus.

== Legal career ==
After some time in private legal practice, Batohi entered public service in 1986 as a junior prosecutor at the magistrate's court in Chatsworth, Natal. She served continuously as a public prosecutor in Natal (later renamed KwaZulu-Natal) for the next 15 years. By the end of apartheid, she was a member of the Natal Attorney-General's office, and in 1995 she was seconded to Frank Dutton's Investigation Task Unit, a multi-disciplinary law enforcement unit established by President Nelson Mandela; the unit investigated so-called "third force" political violence in Natal during the post-apartheid transition.

Batohi went on to serve as a Director of Public Prosecutions in the KwaZulu-Natal branch of the National Prosecuting Authority (NPA) from 2000 to 2009. In 2000, she was the chief prosecutor and evidence leader at the King Commission, the high-profile commission of inquiry that, under the chairmanship of Edwin King, investigated the cricket match fixing scandal. In that capacity she acquired public notoriety for her cross-examination of former Proteas captain Hansie Cronje, who was reduced to tears during his testimony. Later in 2000, she was appointed to replace Chris MacAdam as the head of the KwaZulu-Natal branch of the Scorpions, an elite investigative unit of the National Prosecuting Authority. After leaving the Scorpions, she became the provincial head of the NPA.

In late 2009, Batohi left the NPA to move to the Hague, where she worked at the International Criminal Court (ICC) for the next decade. She entered the court on a one-year contract as senior legal adviser to the ICC prosecutor, Luis Moreno Acampo. She held that job until she was appointed to the head of the NPA in 2019.

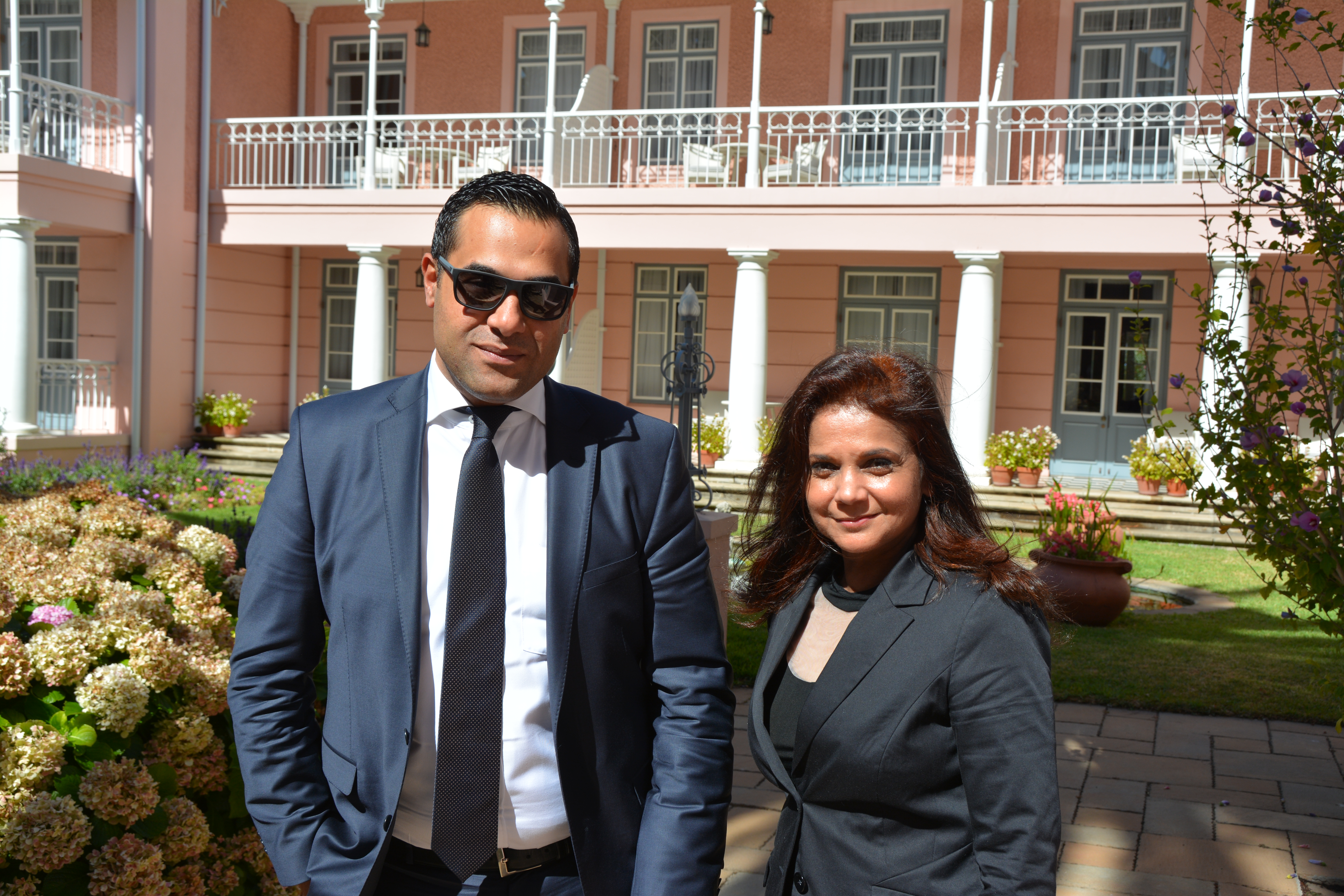
Batohi with Yasser Hammad in Cape Town in March 2016

== National Director of Public Prosecutions: 2019–present ==
In August 2018, the Constitutional Court invalidated the appointment of Shaun Abrahams as National Director of Public Prosecutions (NDPP), ordering the appointment of a new head prosecutor within 90 days. In early November, Batohi was among the lawyers whom President Cyril Ramaphosa shortlisted for possible appointment to the position. On 16 November at the Union Buildings, she was the last of 11 candidates to be interviewed by an advisory panel led by Minister Jeff Radebe. The panel asked her at length about accusations of racism that had been lodged against her by subordinates during her time in the KwaZulu-Natal NPA; she said that she had put the dispute behind her, but that she had been "horrified" by the accusations and dissatisfied with the dispute resolution process, which had generated a recommendation that she should seek anger management counselling. She was also asked about a speeding fine on her record.

In the aftermath of the interviews, Radebe's advisory panel announced a final shortlist of five nominees which included Batohi, as well as Siyabulela Mapoma, Simphiwe Mlotshwa, Rodney de Kock, and Andrea Johnson. The Sunday Times reported that Ramaphosa favoured Batohi. Commentators noted that her decade at the Hague meant that she was relatively well-insulated from the NPA's internal politics, while the Democratic Alliance's Glynnis Breytenbach said she was "a very good administrator".

On 4 December 2018, President Ramaphosa announced that he would appoint Batohi to the position. The announcement was well received, and she took office on 1 February 2019, becoming the first woman to serve as an NDPP.

=== State capture ===
Upon taking office, Batohi said that her priority would be addressing corruption in the private and public sectors. The NPA had become a site of contestation over so-called state capture during the presidency of Jacob Zuma, and some of her first significant decisions as NDPP were symbolic reversals of Zuma-era decisions. Among other things, she dropped the Cato Manor death squad prosecution, commissioned a review of the rogue unit prosecution, and reappointed Willie Hofmeyr as head of the Asset Forfeiture Unit.

During her first years in office, Batohi emphasised the structural problems and budget constraints that impeded the NPA's recovery from state capture. However, public pressure continued to mount for the NPA to effect high-profile corruption prosecutions. In 2023 and 2024, the NPA's first major state capture prosecutions – the Vrede Dairy Project case against Nulane Investments and the criminal case against former Eskom CEO Matshela Koko – were both struck off the roll.

A central element of the NPA's response to state capture was the establishment of the Investigating Directorate (ID) as an NPA unit in 2019. President Ramaphosa announced the initiative in his 2019 State of the Nation Address, saying that he and Batohi had conceived the directorate as a means of addressing serious corruption and implementing the recommendations of the Zondo Commission. The inaugural director of the ID was Hermione Cronje, whom Batohi had personally headhunted for the role. However, in December 2021, Cronje announced her resignation from the unit, sparking rumours that she was frustrated by the NPA's lack of capacity and even had clashed with Batohi as a result. Batohi denied these rumours.

=== Apartheid-era crimes ===
Alongside her focus on corruption, Batohi announced the revival of NPA investigations into the apartheid-era crimes traversed at the Truth and Reconciliation Commission. The NPA and Hawks released a joint statement in this regard on the anniversary of the Cradock Four murders in 2021. A contingent of NPA prosecutors and Hawks investigators were seconded to a unit dealing exclusively with over 100 such matters, and Batohi asked the judiciary to reopen inquests into the deaths of anti-apartheid activists Neil Aggett and Hoosen Haffajee. In June 2022, she said that the Justice Minister, Ronald Lamola, was likely to establish an inquiry to investigate whether the prosecution of apartheid-era crimes had been obstructed by political interference under past governments.

== Personal life ==
Batohi has two adult sons named Nikhil and Shaunik.
