= Andy Mothibi =

South African lawyer

- Born: Ca. 1963; 63 years ago Near Hammanskraal, Gauteng
- Citizenship: South Africa
- Education: The North-West University
- Occupations: Lawyer and National Director of Public Prosecutions
- Organization: National Prosecuting Authority
- Known for: Head of the Special Investigating Unit
- Style: Advocate
- Predecessor: Shamila Batohi (NDPP)

Jan Lekgoa Mothibi is a South African lawyer who was appointed by President Cyril Ramaphosa to lead the National Prosecuting Authority as National Director of Public Prosecutions effective 1 February 2026. Previously, Mothibe was the head of the Special Investigating Unit.

== Early life ==
Mothibi completed his high school education in Zeerust, in the North West province, during the 1970s.

He subsequently graduated from the North-West University with a BProc degree in 1987.

== Career ==
After qualifying as an advocate, he became a public prosecutor in the Johannesburg Regional and Magistrates Courts, and the Soweto Magistrates Court, and served as a magistrate in both the Johannesburg and Soweto Magistrates Courts.

In 1995, Mothibi began working as Head Employee Relations at what was then the national Department of Finance, and was part of the project to establish the South African Revenue Service (SARS), where he then headed its corporate services and governance functions.

In 2005, he became Head of Compliance at flag carrier South African Airways (SAA), and implemented the company's Enterprise and Compliance Risk Management Framework. Mothibi then joined Nedbank in 2007 as Senior Manager of Enterprise Risk Management. Within six months, he was promoted to Nedbank's General Manager of Group Operational Risk Management.

In 2012, Mothibi was appointed Head of Standard Bank's Operational Risk Management. The role included assessing operational risks, including developing anti-fraud and anti-money laundering scenarios.

In October 2013, he was appointed Executive Director at Medscheme Holding, a subsidiary of AfroCentric Health.

Special Investigating Unit

In May 2016, South African President Cyril Ramaphosa appointed Mothibi Head of the anti-corruption body, the Special Investigating Unit (SIU). The body investigates maladministration, malpractice, and corruption within state institutions and the private sector, as authorized by proclamations issued by the country's President.

After a much-publicized hollowing out of the SIU's independence through cadre deployments by former President Jacob Zuma, Mothibi rebuilt the organization through implementing a turnaround strategy. A focus was placed on ethical leadership, clean governance and building strategic partnerships.

Proponents of Mothibi's work say that he transformed the agency into a highly effective anti-corruption body, citing examples such as the R8 billion which the SIU saved for the state in the 2023/24 financial year. Under Mothibi's leadership, the SIU processed thousands of cases. He drove major investigations into scandals at entities including Eskom, Transnet, PRASA, NSFAS, and Tembisa Hospital.

National Prosecuting Authority

On 6 January 2026, South African President Cyril Ramaphosa announced that Mothibi would join the country's National Prosecuting Authority (NPA) to become South Africa's National Director of Public Prosecutions (NDPP), effective 1 February 2026. As such, he would replace Shamila Batohi. Leonard Lekgetho, COO of the SIU, will replace Mothibi as Head of the Unit.

Mothibi's appointment was welcomed by the Democratic Alliance (South Africa) (DA) and Inkatha Freedom Party (IFP).

At his first media briefing as NDPP, in Pretoria on 12 March 2026, Mothibi stated that giving the National Prosecuting Authority genuine independence was central to rebuilding trust and capacity in the institution. As a result, he said that a draft amendment to the NPA Act would be tabled in Parliament during the next financial year. Furthermore, he said that the Ministry of Justice and Constitutional Development was fully supportive of the changes, and that if promulgated, the new legislation would allow the NPA to have its own Accounting Officer, giving it more control over its finances and administration.
