= Hoffmeier =

Hoffmeier is a surname of German origin, being a variant of the surname Hofmeyer. Notable people with the surname include:

- Frederikke Hoffmeier (born 1989), better known as Puce Mary, Danish experimental musician, composer, and sound artist
- James K. Hoffmeier (born 1951), American scholar, archaeologist, and Egyptologist
- Marcel Hoffmeier (born 1999), German footballer

== See also ==
- Hofmeier
- Hoffmeyer
