= Jackie Selebi =

South African police commissioner and convicted felon (1950–2015)

Jacob "Jackie" Sello Selebi

President of Interpol
- In office 2004–2008
- Preceded by: Jesús Espigares Mira
- Succeeded by: Arturo Verdugo (acting); Khoo Boon Hui

National Commissioner of the South African Police Service
- In office 2000–2009
- Preceded by: George Fivaz
- Succeeded by: Bheki Cele

Personal details
- Born: 7 March 1950 Soweto, Johannesburg, South Africa
- Died: 23 January 2015 (aged 64) Pretoria, South Africa
- Spouse: Anne Selebi (Unknown)

Jacob "Jackie" Sello Selebi (7 March 1950 – 23 January 2015) was the National Commissioner of the South African Police Service from January 2000 to January 2008, when he was put on extended leave and charged with corruption. He was also a former president of African National Congress Youth League, South African ambassador to the United Nations from 1995 to 1998, and President of Interpol from 2004 to 2008. Selebi was found guilty of corruption on 2 July 2010 and sentenced to 15 years' imprisonment on 3 August 2010. However, he was released on medical parole in July 2012, after serving less than a year of his sentence, and lived at home until his death on 23 January 2015.

An anti-apartheid activist in his youth, Selebi was a member of the African National Congress (ANC) and a political ally of former president Thabo Mbeki. He is among the most senior members of the ANC to be subject to criminal corruption charges. His investigation and trial, which together lasted over five years, received significant public attention, and were highly politically sensitive. On some views, the trial contributed to the politicisation of the South African criminal justice system, particularly by contributing to the marginalisation and ultimately the disbanding of the Scorpions, the elite unit of the National Prosecuting Agency which had pursued Selebi.

== Biography ==
Selebi was born on 7 March 1950 in Soweto, a township in the south of Johannesburg. He had a bachelor's degree from the University of the North, and in the 1980s taught history at several schools. He was a member of the African National Congress (ANC) and was detained by police at least twice for his anti-apartheid activities. He spent time in exile in the Soviet Union and in Tanzania, where he taught at the Solomon Mahlangu Freedom College, and was a representative of the left-wing World Federation of Democratic Youth from 1983 to 1987. In 1987, while in exile in Zambia, he was elected to the ANC National Executive Committee and as head of the ANC Youth League. In 1991, with the ANC making preparations for the end of apartheid, he was put in charge of organising the repatriation of ANC exiles. In 1993, he was appointed director of the ANC's department of welfare.

=== Government career ===
In the first democratic elections of 1994, Selebi was elected as a Member of Parliament. From 1995 to 1998, he served as the South African ambassador to the United Nations in Geneva. In that capacity, he chaired the 1997 Oslo Conference on an International Total Ban on Anti-Personnel Land Mines, at which the Ottawa Treaty was concluded. He also chaired the 54th session of the United Nations Commission on Human Rights in 1998, led the preparatory committees for the Comprehensive Nuclear Test Ban Treaty Organisation, and belonged to the board of trustees at the United Nations Institute for Training and Research. From 1998 to 1999, he was Director-General of the Department of Foreign Affairs in President Nelson Mandela's government. In 2000, newly elected President Thabo Mbeki appointed him National Commissioner of the South African Police Service (SAPS). In 2002, while SAPS Commissioner, Selebi was named a vice president of Interpol. In 2004, he became its first African president.

=== Conviction, parole, and death ===
In January 2008, Selebi resigned from Interpol in order to deal with the corruption allegations against him. He was also put on "extended leave" by Mbeki, reportedly at his own request – effectively, he was suspended, and Tim Williams was appointed acting National Commissioner. He was convicted of corruption in July 2010 and sentenced to 15 years' imprisonment. In December 2011, he reportedly collapsed in his home after learning that his final appeal had been rejected, and was hospitalised. When he began serving his prison sentence later that month, he was moved immediately to the hospital ward. After serving fewer than 250 days of his sentence, he was granted medical parole in July 2012, on the grounds that he had end-stage renal failure. He was released to his home in Waterkloof, Gauteng, where he remained under supervision, and where he reportedly received dialysis several times daily. He died in hospital in Pretoria on 23 January 2015, at the age of 64.

He was married – his wife, Anne Selebi, was a nurse – and had two children.

== Controversies ==
=== Response to crime rate ===
In January 2007, Selebi was criticised for his response to a question from the Standing Committee on Public Accounts about police training ahead of the 2010 Soccer World Cup. "What's all the fuss about crime?" he asked. He said that crime had decreased since the Rugby World Cup was held in South Africa in 1995, and that there was "no reason for a frenzy about 2010."

=== Legalising prostitution ===
In March 2007, Selebi suggested to a parliamentary committee that prostitution and public drinking should be legalised for the duration of the 2010 World Cup, in order to reduce the policing burden. Some opposition parties and civil society groups expressed dismay.

== Corruption charges ==
=== Investigation and arrest ===
By late 2006, Selebi was known to be under investigation by the Scorpions for corruption. Thabo Mbeki, who was president at the time, has since said that the Scorpions' investigation into Selebi grew out of investigations into the 2005 murder of mining magnate and ANC donor Brett Kebble. The investigation concerned, among other things, Selebi's relationship with Glenn Agliotti, who in 2006 pleaded guilty to drug smuggling and was charged with Kebble's murder (he was acquitted in November 2010). Agliotti called Selebi from the scene of the Kebble's murder, and much media attention was given to the extent of their friendship and the extent of Selebi's knowledge of Agliotti's criminal activities. Selebi infamously said of Agliotti, the day after Agliotti's arrest for murder, "He is my friend, finish and klaar ['and that's that']."

In September 2007, arrest and search warrants were issued against Selebi, and then withdrawn. Shortly afterwards, Mbeki suspended the director of public prosecutions, Vusi Pikoli. Selebi was known as a close ally of Mbeki, and Mbeki had defended him in the media. Some accused of Mbeki of protecting Selebi from dismissal and prosecution, a charge which he denied strenuously in a 2016 newsletter.

In January 2008, the chief prosecutor in the case, Gerrie Nel of the Scorpions, was arrested at his home, apparently for unrelated charges. The charges against Nel were quickly dropped. Speaking at the Mokgoro Commission in 2019, Willie Hofmeyr of the National Prosecuting Agency (NPA) alleged that Nel's arrest had been calculated to delay Selebi's prosecution, and was part of a broader conspiracy to protect Selebi. In the same week, the NPA announced that they intended to charge Selebi with corruption, fraud, money laundering, and racketeering. Selebi approached the Pretoria High Court, asking the court to block the state from laying charges against him for corruption. In order to deal with the allegations against him, he resigned from Interpol, and went on "extended leave" from his SAPS position. On 31 January 2008, he made his first appearance in the Randburg Regional Court, where he was charged with three counts of corruption and one count of defeating the ends of justice.

=== Trial ===
After several delays, the trial began on 5 October 2009, with Nel acting as chief prosecutor. The prosecution alleged that Selebi had accepted bribes and gifts from Kebble, Agliotti, and businessman Muller Conrad Rautenbach. In exchange, Selebi had allegedly provided information about police investigations and preferential police treatment. Agliotti, who testified as part of an agreement that he would not be prosecuted for related offences, said in court that he had paid Selebi over R1.2 million in bribes. He claimed that he, Selebi, and their partners had gone shopping together in Sandton City, with Agliotti paying for the clothes they bought. He also claimed to have bought Selebi's wife a R10 000 red patent Louis Vuitton handbag for her birthday.

Selebi denied the charges and pleaded not guilty. He claimed that the charges against him were part of a political conspiracy – driven in particular by former members of the Scorpions – and that evidence against him had been fabricated by Pikoli and Bulelani Ngcuka of the NPA, both of whom he implicated in corrupt activities of their own. He said in court that the trial involved "malicious prosecution and an attempt to discredit me." Nel, of the prosecution, was also accused of corruption during the trial.

=== Conviction and sentencing ===
On 2 July 2010, Selebi was found guilty of corruption. Judge Meyer Joffe of the Johannesburg High Court said that the prosecution had proved beyond reasonable doubt that Selebi had accepted money in exchange for favours. He said that Selebi had furthermore shown "complete contempt for the truth" and "low moral fibre," including by falsely accusing a witness of lying during the trial. Selebi was found not guilty of the further charge of defeating the ends of justice.

On 3 August 2010, Selebi was sentenced to fifteen years' imprisonment. In the sentencing hearing, Judge Joffe said that Selebi had shown no remorse, had lied in court, and was "an embarrassment to all right-thinking citizens of South Africa." He was released on bail of R20 000, pending an appeal application. The Supreme Court of Appeal upheld his conviction on 2 December 2011.

=== Fall-out from the case ===
Vusi Pikoli of the NPA was suspended in 2007, by Mbeki, and subsequently fired in 2009, by Mbeki's successor, Kgalema Motlanthe. Pikoli claimed that he was removed because of his role in prosecuting Selebi. Prosecutor Billy Downer has described Pikoli's removal as "an all-time low on the rule-of-law barometer." The Scorpions were disbanded in 2008, with at least some commentators linking the decision to the unit's investigations into and cases against Selebi and Jacob Zuma, another prominent ANC politician. The court proceedings also uncovered accusations that Mulangi Mphego, who was head of Crime Intelligence at the time, had intervened in the case to obtain Agliotti's testimony by illegitimate means. He resigned in 2009 and was charged with defeating the ends of justice, although the charge was later dropped. Former deputy of the NPA Nomgcobo Jiba has also been subject to accusations, which she denies, that she was involved in attempts to obstruct the prosecution. In 2010, the South African Revenue Services laid a complaint against certain NPA officials in the prosecuting team, which the NPA referred to the Hawks for investigation. In July 2014, the NPA began an internal investigation into Selebi's prosecution, after Selebi's family and legal team filed a complaint of misconduct, alleging that the prosecution had not revealed all the evidence in its possession during the trial. Shaun Abrahams led the investigation.

== Notes ==
| Preceded by John George Fivaz | National Commissioner of the South African Police Service; 2000–2009 (on leave from 1/2008) | Succeeded by Bheki Cele |
