= Jan Hofmeyr =

Jan Hofmeyr may refer to:

- Jan Christoffel Hofmeyr (1829–1898), South African notary, financier, benefactor and Mayor of Cape Town
- Jan Hendrik Hofmeyr (Onze Jan), (1845–1909), known as "Our Jan" (Onze Jan), journalist and South African politician, leader of the Afrikaner Bond political party of the Cape Colony
- Jan Hendrik Hofmeyr (1894–1948), nephew of "Our Jan", Rhodes Scholar, university professor and South African politician
- Jan-Hendrik S. Hofmeyr (born 1953), South African biologist and complexity theorist
- Jan Hendrik Hofmeyr de Waal (1871–1937), Afrikaner lawyer and politician
