= Dave Hoffmeyer =

American soccer player

Personal information
- Date of birth: May 31, 1955 (age 71)
- Place of birth: St. Louis, Missouri, U.S.
- Position: Midfielder

Youth career
- 1974–1977: Akron Zips

Senior career*
| Years | Team | Apps | (Gls) |
| 1978 | Detroit Express | 1 | (0) |
| 1978–1979 | Pittsburgh Spirit (indoor) | 24 | (7) |
| 1979–1980 | Buffalo Stallions (indoor) | 4 | (0) |
| 1980–1981 | Denver Avalanche (indoor) | 2 | (0) |
- * Club domestic league appearances and goals

Dave Hoffmeyer (born May 31, 1955) is an American retired soccer midfielder who played professionally in the North American Soccer League and Major Indoor Soccer League.

Hoffmeyer attended the University of Akron, playing on the school's soccer team from 1974 to 1977. In 1978, he signed with the Detroit Express of the North American Soccer League before moving indoors with the Pittsburgh Spirit of the Major Indoor Soccer League in the fall of 1978.

Hoffmeyer coached the Rice University Lads, a college level soccer club competing against Southwest Conferences schools in 1979
