= Hawks (South Africa) =

National intelligence agency of South Africa

Directorate for Priority Crime Investigation
- Common name: Hawks
- Abbreviation: DPCI

Agency overview
- Formed: 2008
- Preceding agency: Scorpions (South Africa)

Jurisdictional structure
- National agency: South Africa
- Operations jurisdiction: South Africa
- General nature: Civilian police

Operational structure
- Headquarters: Pretoria, South Africa
- Agency executive: Seswantsho Godfrey Lebeya, National Head
- Parent agency: South African Police Service

Website
- DPCI

The Directorate for Priority Crime Investigation (DPCI), commonly known as the Hawks, is the branch of the South African Police Service which investigates organised crime, economic crime, corruption, and other serious crime referred to it by the President or another division of the police. The unit was established in 2008 by President Jacob Zuma to replace the disbanded Scorpions.

== Establishment ==
The decision to replace the Scorpions with a new organisation (The Hawks) came from a resolution taken by the ruling African National Congress (ANC) at the 52nd National Conference of the African National Congress in 2007 in Polokwane, Limpopo. The ANC argued that government oversight was needed in such a body so as to avoid the agency being used as a political tool to investigate politicians. This followed from a power struggle between Thabo Mbeki and Jacob Zuma that resulted in an investigation into Zuma's involvement in the arms deal.

The DPCI was established as an independent directorate within the SAPS in terms of Section 17C of the South Africa Police Services Act, 1995 as amended by the South African Police Service Amendment Act, 2008 (Act 57 of 2008).

Certain provisions of the Act were found to be unconstitutional by the Constitutional Court of South Africa in March 2011 in Glenister v President of the Republic of South Africa. As a result, the Act was amended by Parliament in September 2012. Sections of the amended Act were themselves found to be invalid and deleted by the Constitutional Court in November 2014 in the Helen Suzman Foundation v President of the Republic of South Africa and Others; Glenister v President of the Republic of South Africa and Others. Following the judgement President Zuma reiterated his support for keeping the unit under the control of SAPS and thereby also under the control of executive government.

== National Directorate Head ==
The following people have represented the DPCI as its national head:

- Anwa Dramat 2009 – 2014
- Berning Ntlemeza (acting) 2014 – 2015
- Berning Ntlemeza 2015 – 2017
- Yolisa Matakata (acting) 2017 – 2018
- Godfrey Lebeya 2018 – April 2025

== Corruption ==
Detractors of the decision to reform the Scorpions into The Hawks expressed concern that the new agency would not be as effective as the Scorpions in dealing with government corruption. Inkatha Freedom Party MP Koos van der Merwe described the decision to replace the Scorpions with The Hawks was done so as to "protect ANC leaders and members from criminal investigation and possible prosecution." When the organisation was first founded its staff reported to then National Commissioner of Police Jackie Selebi. Selebi was, at the time, under investigation for corruption by the Scorpions.

In the period following the replacement of the Scorpions by The Hawks levels of corruption within and outside of government has increased. A number of studies have found the lack of political independence to investigate corruption as well as its dependence on SAPS has had a strongly negative effect on the organisation's effectiveness.

== Controversies ==
=== Booysen/Jiba charges ===
In 2015 former head of The Hawks office in KwaZulu-Natal, Major General Johan Booysen, sued the state for wrongful arrest. Booysen was arrested in 2012 for allegedly being involved in operating a “death squad” as part of the Hawks Cato Manor organised crime unit. The Booysen arrest was initiated by Nomgcobo Jiba, then acting national director of public prosecutions. Following the arrest Jiba was tried for "fraud and perjury relating to her failed attempts to prosecute Booysen." Booysen claims that he was "set up and criminally charged to stop him pursuing specific cases of corruption."

=== Gordhan investigation ===
In mid-2016 The Hawks were involved in a controversial investigation of Finance Minister Pravin Gordhan following his ministerial appointment. Gordhan was investigated for his possible role in setting up and running a "rogue" investigatory unit whilst he was head of the South African Revenue Service (SARS) shortly after Zuma was compelled to appoint him Finance Minister following public outrage at the firing of the former minister of Finance Nhlanhla Nene. Supporters of Gordhan believe the Hawks' investigation was politically motivated and done so as to remove him from office and lack legal merit. ANC member and head of the Independent Police Investigative Directorate, Robert McBride, has accused the Hawks of being used by the ANC to fight internal political battles within the ruling party. It was alleged that the Hawks illegally detained and assaulted a senior SARS employee in an effort to take a hard copy of an email mistakenly sent to him in which SARS's legal counsel stated their disagreement with the Hawks and National Prosecuting Authority's decision to prosecute Gordhan.

=== Silverton investigation ===
In November 2020, two senior Hawks officials who were stationed in the Pretoria suburb of Silverton, Brigadier Peggy Morongo and Colonel Malesela Moylan were arrested along with former SAPS Colonel Paulina Mokgadi. It was alleged that their promotional appointments were obtained through fraud and corruption. Following their arrests, all three officers appeared in the Pretoria Specialised Commercial Crimes court.
