= Special Investigating Unit =

South African law enforcement agency

- Abbreviation: SIU

Agency overview
- Formed: July 1997; 29 years ago

Jurisdictional structure
- Operations jurisdiction: South Africa
- Constituting instrument: Special Investigating Units and Special Tribunals Act No. 74 of 1996

Operational structure
- Overseen by: Minister of Justice and Constitutional Development
- Headquarters: Rentmeester Building, 74 Watermeyer Street, Meyerspark, 0183, Pretoria, Gauteng, South Africa

Website
- siu.org.za

The Special Investigating Unit (SIU) is an independent agency of the South African government which investigates corruption and maladministration in state institutions. It was first established in July 1997 by President Nelson Mandela, although it has not operated continuously since then. As of 2022, the SIU was headed by Advocate Andy Mothibi and had its headquarters in Meyer's Park, Pretoria.

Its primary mandate is to provide anti-corruption, forensic investigation, and litigation services to combat corruption, serious malpractice, and maladministration in state institutions. It therefore not only investigates cases but also is empowered to take civil action to correct wrongdoing which it uncovers, including by recovering financial losses suffered by the state.

The SIU also has the power to subpoena witnesses, bank statements, and cellphone records; powers of search and seizure; and power to interrogate witnesses under oath. However, it is required to refer evidence of criminal conduct to the National Prosecuting Authority.

== History ==
It is an independent statutory body under South Africa's Special Investigating Units and Special Tribunals Act No. 74 of 1996. It was established on 14 July 1997 by Presidential Proclamation R24 of 1997, signed by Nelson Mandela to enact that law. Its mandate was to investigate serious malpractice or maladministration in connection with the administration of state institutions, assets, or money, as well as any conduct which may seriously harm the interests of the public.

Although it was intended to be a temporary body, it continued its anti-corruption work until dissolved by a 2001 Constitutional Court ruling. It was re-established after legislative amendments were made to address the Court's complaints.

Under President Jacob Zuma, the agency was part of the government's multi-disciplinary Anti-Corruption Task Team. In 2019, the Special Tribunal was established to hear civil litigation matters arising from SIU investigations, including on asset forfeiture, meaning that the SIU no longer has to institute such matters in the mainstream high courts.

== See also ==
- Scorpions
- Corruption in South Africa
