= Nomgcobo Jiba =

South African lawyer

Deputy National Director of Public Prosecutions of The National Prosecuting Authority of South Africa
- In office 22 December 2010 – 15 September 2016
- Appointed by: President Jacob Zuma
- Preceded by: Menzi Simelane
- Succeeded by: Mxolisi Nxasana

Personal details
- Born: Nomgcobo Jiba South Africa
- Education: Damelin College; Walter Sisulu University
- Occupation: Prosecutor
- Profession: Lawyer

Nomgcobo Jiba was the Deputy National Director of Public Prosecutions in South Africa.

== Early life and education ==
Nomgcobo Jiba obtained her LLB from Walter Sisulu University in 1989 and went on to obtain her master's degree in Commercial Law in 1996.

== Career ==
Jiba worked as a prosecutor in Peddie magistrate's court in the Eastern Cape in 1988 going on to also practice in courts at Tsolo and Mthatha. She resigned from government in 1997 to work for the legal firm Qunta Ntsebeza in Cape Town so as to work towards becoming an attorney, qualifying in 1998. In 1999 Jiba worked for Deloitte & Touche as a Senior Forensic Consultant in Pretoria and joined the Investigating Directorate for Serious Economic Offences as a Senior State Advocate. The Investigating Directorate was disbanded in 2001 and replaced by the Scorpions whereupon Jiba was appointed Deputy Director of Public Prosecutions. She was appointed Senior Deputy Director of Public Prosecutions in 2006. After the Scorpions was disbanded she was moved to the Specialised Commercial Crimes Court in 2009. In December 2010 Jiba was promoted to Deputy National Director of Public Prosecutions at the National Prosecuting Authority, a position that gave her oversight of all prosecutorial decisions made by the state.

=== Deputy National Director of Public Prosecutions ===
On 15 September 2016 Jiba was struck off the role of advocates by the North Gauteng High Court for her role in the handling of a number of politically related cases. This included the decision to drop corruption charges against former head of the South African Police Service's Crime Intelligence Division Richard Mdluli. Other cases include being tried for fraud and perjury in a failed attempt to convict former Hawks official Major General Johan Booysen in 2012. Booysen alleged that Jiba attempted to set him up so as to stop him from investigating specific cases of corruption involving president Zuma's family. She was also criticised by the courts for her role in handling the Zuma "spy tapes" scandal.

The decision to strike Jiba off the role of advocates was overturned by the SCA in September 2018.

On 26 April 2019, it was announced that Jiba had been fired by president Cyril Ramaphosa acting on the recommendation of the Mokgoro inquiry.

=== Private Prosecution ===
In 2015 the head of the NPA, Shaun Abrahams, announced that the case against Jiba would be dropped. In November 2017 advocate Gerrie Nel and AfriForum instituted legal action to prosecute Jiba. A month later the High Court in Pretoria set aside the NPA decision to withdraw the charges against Jiba. This effectively meant the NPA was obliged to reinstate them. As of 2020 she has yet to be informed of the status of these charges.

== Controversy ==
Jiba's husband, Booker Nhantsi, was convicted of stealing R193,000 from a client's trust fund in 2003 and sentenced to five years in prison, but had his criminal record expunged after he received a presidential pardon from President Jacob Zuma in 2010. In August 2021 she made pro bono representations for Democracy in Action (DIA) in which she argued that Jacob Zuma should not have been imprisoned for contempt of court without first having a trial.

In 2007 the NPA head Mokotedi Mpshe suspended Jiba for allegedly assisting a police investigation against former NPA prosecutor Gerrie Nel, who was at the time Gauteng head of the now disbanded Scorpions. The disciplinary process never happened.

In March 2012 in her role as acting NDPP she was ordered by the SCA to hand over the record of all documents and material that formed the basis of the decision to withdraw corruption charges against Zuma. She did not comply with the order.

In April 2015 she appeared before the Specialised Commercial Crime Court facing charges of fraud and perjury for her role in the constitutionally inconsistent and invalid prosecution of a team investigating members of Jacob Zuma's family for corruption. Booysen told the Mokgoro inquiry that the reason he had been charged by Jiba was because he got in the way of the business interests of former president Jacob Zuma’s son Edward.

The Daily Maverick has alleged that Western Cape Division High Court Judge John Hlophe has attempted to protect Jiba from prosecution in the past by constantly appointing Judge Mokgoatji Dolamo to dismiss cases involving Jiba.

Former BOSASA executive, Angelo Agrizzi, testified to the Zondo Commission into state corruption that Jiba was receiving payments from BOSASA to ensure that corruption charges against the company would not be pursued by the National Director of Public Prosecutions.
