= Shaun Abrahams =

South African National Prosecution head

Director of National Prosecuting Authority
- In office 2015–2018
- President: Jacob Zuma
- Preceded by: Mxolisi Nxasana
- Succeeded by: Silas Ramaite (acting); Shamila Batohi

Shaun Abrahams is a South African lawyer and the former national director of public prosecutions (NDPP) at the National Prosecuting Authority.

== Early life ==
Abrahams was born in Piketberg in the Cape where his father worked in construction and his mother was a teacher. He attended school in Pietermaritzburg.

== Career ==
Prior to his appointment in 2015 when Mxolisi Nxasana stepped down as NDPP, Abrahams had been a senior state advocate in the Priority Crimes Litigation Unit. Questions were immediately raised about the manner in which he had been promoted ahead of more senior prosecutors.

Abrahams had joined the NPA as an administrative clerk in a provincial office while completing his legal studies. He holds B Iuris, B Proc and LLB degrees, which he read part-time at the University of Natal, Pietermaritzburg.

Abrahams has been seen as complicit in helping President Jacob Zuma avoid corruption charges, and was given the nickname "Shaun The Sheep" as a result. Abrahams has described himself as "nobody’s man".

Abrahams' appointment was challenged by Freedom Under Law, and on 8 December 2017, his appointment was set aside by a full bench of the High Court, finding that he was irregularly appointed. The court also ruled that President Zuma was conflicted and therefore a replacement should be appointed by the Deputy President Cyril Ramaphosa instead, and this must be done within 60 days. The NPA appealed this ruling, but in August 2018, in Corruption Watch v President, the Constitutional Court ordered that Shaun Abrahams vacate his position as NDPP and President Cyril Ramaphosa appoint a new NDPP within 90 days.

Abrahams reportedly retired from the NPA with benefits, but the NPA declined to comment on such employment-related matters. Abrahams said he would not be lost to the legal fraternity.

Abrahams was succeeded as NDPP by Silas Ramaite in an acting capacity. His successor, Shamila Batohi, was appointed NDPP on 4 December 2018 and assumed office in February 2019.
