= Prevention of Organised Crime Act, 1998 =

South African law

The Prevention of Organised Crime Act (No. 121 of 1998) is a statute promulgated by the Parliament of South Africa. It introduced measures to allow prosecutors to combat organised crime, money laundering, and gang activity. It also prohibited certain types of racketeering activities and abolished money laundering and established an obligation for people to report it.
