= National Prosecuting Authority =

South African government agency

Agency overview
- Formed: 1998; 28 years ago
- Jurisdiction: South Africa
- Headquarters: Silverton, Pretoria
- Employees: 4 500
- Annual budget: R 4.956 billion (2022-23)
- Minister responsible: Mmamoloko Kubayi, Minister of Justice and Constitutional Development
- Agency executive: Andy Mothibi, National Director of Public Prosecutions
- Parent department: Department of Justice and Constitutional Development
- Key document: National Prosecuting Authority Act, 1998
- Website: www.npa.gov.za

The National Prosecuting Authority (NPA) is the agency of the South African Government responsible for state prosecutions. Under Section 179 of the South African Constitution and the National Prosecuting Authority Act of 1998, which established the NPA in 1998, the NPA has the power to institute criminal proceedings on behalf of the state and to carry out any necessary functions incidental to institution of criminal proceedings. The NPA is accountable to Parliament, and final responsibility over it lies with the Minister of Justice and Constitutional Development.

== Structure ==
On a national level, the NPA is headed by the National Director of Public Prosecutions (NDPP). The NDPP is appointed by the President of South Africa for a term of 10 years.

The NDPP is supported by a chief executive officer, a position which was filled by Marion Sparg from 2000 to 2007, and by four Deputy National Directors of Public Prosecutions. At the national level, there are also four Special Directors and an Investigating Director. Every seat of the High Court of South Africa is served by a Director of Public Prosecutions (DPP), who acts as the prosecution authority for that Court's jurisdictional area.

== Business units ==
=== National Prosecution Service ===
The National Prosecution Service (NPS) is composed of the various DPP offices (and their subordinates) and are responsible for the day to day criminal prosecutions. State Advocates (attached to the office of the DPP) prosecute matters in the Superior Courts, whilst Public Prosecutors (attached to various Magistrate's Courts), prosecute matters in the Lower Courts.

=== Investigating Directorate ===
The Investigating Directorate (ID) was created in April 2019. Its mandate is to investigate and prosecute high-profile and complex crimes, especially under the Prevention of Organised Crime Act, the Prevention and Combatting of Corrupt Activities Act, and the Public Finance Management Act.

The ID is sometimes called the "New Scorpions," after the NPA's former Directorate of Special Operations, better known as the Scorpions. The Scorpions, launched on 1 September 1999 and controversially disbanded in July 2009, was also an elite unit which investigated organised crime and pursued politically sensitive cases.

Up to 2022 it worked with the Zondo Commission on prominent cases relating to state capture, and since its establishment has been led by Hermione Cronje, who tendered her resignation on 30 November 2021. As of January 2022, it is reportedly investigating allegations and evidence contained within the first part of the Zondo Commission Report.

=== Specialised Commercial Crime ===
The Specialised Commercial Crime Unit (SCCU) was established to prosecute serious economic offences such as fraud. Some of its cases are also high-profile – for example, it is currently investigating fraud at Steinhoff and VBS Mutual Bank. In 2012, there was a scandal when SCCU head Lawrence Mrwebi unlawfully dropped fraud and corruption charges that SCCU prosecutors had been pursuing against Richard Mdluli, the former head of the police's Crime Intelligence Division.

=== Asset Forfeiture ===
The Asset Forfeiture Unit (AFU) was established in May 1999, to give effect to certain provisions in the Prevention of Organised Crime Act which allow for the criminal or civil seizure (and subsequent forfeiture to the state) of assets belonging to perpetrators of crime. Once forfeited, these assets are realised and are utilised to compensate the victims of crime and/or are ploughed back into law enforcement.

=== Sexual Offences and Community Affairs ===
The Sexual Offences and Community Affairs (SOCA) unit was established in October 1999 to combat gender-based violence against women and children. SOCA comprises the Sexual Offences Section; the Domestic Violence Section; the Maintenance Section; and the Child Justice Section. It also coordinates the network of Thuthuzela Care Centres (TCCs), which employ a multi-disciplinary approach to deal with victims of rape in South Africa. As of September 2022, there were 58 TCCs.

=== Witness Protection ===
The Office for Witness Protection supports vulnerable and intimidated witnesses and related persons during judicial proceedings. The unit also provides assistance and co-operation to other countries, tribunals and special courts, in the field of witness protection. The functions and duties of the office are classified "SECRET" in terms of the Witness Protection Act.

=== Priority Crimes Litigation ===
The Priority Crimes Litigation Unit (PCLU) was created by Presidential proclamation on 23 March 2003 and mandated to direct investigations and prosecutions for crimes arising from to the Rome Statute, crimes against the State including national and international terrorism, matters emanating from the Truth and Reconciliation (TRC) process and contraventions of the Regulation of Foreign Military Assistance Act (Act No 15 of 1998), the Non-Proliferation of Weapons of Mass Destruction Act (Act No 87 of 1993), The National Conventional Arms Control Act (Act No 41 of 2002), The Nuclear Energy Act (Act No 46 of 1999) and The Intelligence Services Act (Act No 65 of 2002).

=== Administrative units ===
The following units oversee aspects of the NPA's internal organisation:

- The Integrity Management unit monitors and maintains the NPA's integrity and oversees the reactive systems and processes where there has been a compromise of the organisation's integrity
- The Corporate Services unit provides corporate service support to multiple business partners within the NPA.

== Leadership ==
=== List of National Directors ===
List of NDPPs
| Tenure | Name | Appointed by |
|---|---|---|
| 1 August 1998 – July 2004 | Bulelani Ngcuka | Nelson Mandela |
| | Silas Ramaite (acting) | Thabo Mbeki |
| 1 February 2005 – 23 September 2007 | Vusi Pikoli | Thabo Mbeki |
| | Mokotedi Mpshe (acting) | Thabo Mbeki |
| November 2009 – October 2012 | Menzi Simelane | Jacob Zuma |
| | Nomgcobo Jiba (acting) | Jacob Zuma |
| 1 October 2013 – 11 May 2015 | Mxolisi Nxasana | Jacob Zuma |
| | Silas Ramaite (acting) | Jacob Zuma |
| 18 June 2015 – 13 August 2018 | Shaun Abrahams | Jacob Zuma |
| | Silas Ramaite (acting) | Cyril Ramaphosa |
| 1 February 2019 – 1 February 2026 | Shamila Batohi | Cyril Ramaphosa |
| 1 February 2026 – present | Andy Mothibi | Cyril Ramaphosa |

=== History of appointments ===
There has been remarkable instability in the office of the NDPP – no NDPP has ever served his full ten-year term. Two of the three permanent appointments made by Jacob Zuma during his presidency were later invalidated by the Constitutional Court, and two other incumbents were subjected to official inquiries, instituted under Section 12(6) of the National Prosecuting Act of 1998, into their fitness to hold the office. Controversial extraordinary changes in NPA leadership have been attributed to political interference. In June 2014, former NPA prosecutor Glynnis Breytenbach, a Member of Parliament for the Democratic Alliance (DA) and Shadow Minister of Justice, called for an end to ongoing political interference in the NPA, which she said had compromised its integrity.

==== Mbeki and Motlanthe presidencies (1999–2009) ====
The first NDPP, Bulelani Ngcuka, was appointed in 1998, upon the NPA's establishment, and resigned in July 2004. The last two years of his tenure were mired in political scandal, following the NPA's announcement in late 2002 that its Scorpions unit was investigating Zuma, then Deputy President, for corruption related to the Arms Deal. In August 2003, Ngcuka told the media that the NPA had a "prima facie case of corruption" against Zuma but had decided not to prosecute on the basis that the case was probably not winnable. Shortly afterwards, Mac Maharaj told the press that Ngcuka had been a spy for the apartheid government. Ngcuka denied the accusation and it was later found baseless by a specially appointed judicial inquiry, the Hefer Commission. However, in May 2004, following a complaint laid by Zuma, the Public Protector Lawrence Mushwana released a report which found that Ngcuka's statement to the media in August 2003 had been "unfair and improper." A highly public spat ensued between Ngcuka and Mushwana, sometimes also involving former Minister of Justice and Constitutional Development Penuell Maduna. Parliament appointed a special committee to consider Mushwana's report, and in late June endorsed most of its findings. Ngcuka's resignation the next month was rumoured to be related to the Zuma investigation and a result of political pressure.

Silas Ramaite served as acting NDPP until Ngcuka was succeeded by Vusi Pikoli in 2005. On 24 September 2007, President Thabo Mbeki suspended Pikoli, allegedly because of "an irretrievable breakdown" in the relationship between Pikoli and Justice Minister Brigitte Mabandla. However, on 27 September, the South African Broadcasting Corporation reported that the NPA had issued a warrant for the arrest of the head of the South African Police and Interpol, Jackie Selebi, and there was widespread suspicion that Pikoli's suspension was part of a bid to shield Selebi from prosecution. Selebi was nonetheless successfully prosecuted and sentenced to prison, though not until 2010. Mbeki established a Section 12(6) commission of inquiry, headed by Frene Ginwala, to determine Pikoli's fitness for the office of NDPP. The Ginwala Commission recommended that Pikoli should be reinstated, though also that he should "be sensitised to the broader responsibilities of his office and in particular to... the security environment in which that office should function." Despite the Ginwala Commission's recommendations, Pikoli was permanently removed from office by President Kgalema Motlanthe on 8 December 2008. Motlanthe was later prevented by the judiciary in Pikoli v President and Others from appointing a permanent NDPP until the legalities regarding the removal of Pikoli had been sorted in the courts. Pikoli was replaced by Mokotedi Mpshe, who, though appointed only in an acting capacity, is one of the longest-serving NDPPs in the NPA's history.

==== Zuma and Ramaphosa presidencies (2009–present) ====
Menzi Simelane, appointed NDPP in 2009, was removed from office in early October 2012, after the Constitutional Court found, in Democratic Alliance v President, that his appointment had been invalid. The tenure of Nomgcobo Jiba, who served as acting NDPP from the time that Simelane was put on special leave in January 2012, was also controversial, and Jiba has since been accused of enabling state capture, and participating in other political conspiracies, while in office.

Mxolisi Nxasana was appointed NDPP with effect from 1 October 2013. On 5 July 2014, President Zuma announced a Section 12(6) inquiry to determine whether Nxasana was fit to hold office. On 11 May 2015, the inquiry was terminated, but on 31 May 2015 it was announced that Nxasana was stepping down. He was paid out the value of the remainder of his 10-year-contract amounting to R17 million.

On 18 June 2015, Zuma appointed Shaun Abrahams as NDPP. In August 2018, however, in Corruption Watch v President, the Constitutional Court set aside the termination of Nxasana's appointment as NDPP, effectively making Abrahams's appointment invalid, and directed President Cyril Ramaphosa to appoint a new NDPP within 90 days. Ramaphosa appointed Shamila Batohi as NDPP in December 2018. She was replaced as NDPP by advocate Andy Mothibi from 1 February 2026, upon her retirement.

== Controversies ==
=== "Spy tapes" allegations ===
The "spy tapes" were secretly recorded telephone conversations between Ngcuka, who was the former NDPP, and Leonard McCarthy, who was the former head of the Scorpions unit, which had investigated Zuma for corruption relating to the Arms Deal. The tapes, recorded shortly before the December 2007 52nd National Conference of the ruling African National Congress (ANC) at which Zuma beat national President Mbeki in an electoral contest for the ANC presidency, allegedly documented Ngcuka and McCarthy colluding to manipulate the prosecutorial process. The recordings were made by the National Intelligence Agency and the Organised Crime Unit of the South African Police Service.

Shortly before the spy tapes scandal broke in 2009, the Supreme Court of Appeal had overturned an earlier decision by the High Court to dismiss corruption charges against Zuma, so the possibility of a criminal trial had been reopened. However, the tapes were used to support the allegation that the NPA's prosecution of Zuma had been politically motivated. NPA prosecutors maintained that the spy tapes were irrelevant to the actual charges against Zuma, especially since (as products of an intelligence agency) they had likely been illegally obtained, meaning that the burden was on Zuma to prove their authenticity and admissibility. However, they were overruled by Mpshe, who dropped the charges against Zuma in April 2009. He said that the tapes showed that there had been a political conspiracy against Zuma. Sam Sole of amaBhungane agreed that the tapes documented a "crass [pro-Mbeki] partisanship" on the part of McCarthy.

Opposition party the Democratic Alliance (DA) applied to have Mpshe's decision reviewed and set aside – and a court hearing of such a review would require the NPA to provide the DA with the record of proceedings. After a prolonged legal battle, in which the NPA and Zuma sought to keep the content of the spy tapes confidential, the Supreme Court of Appeal in August 2014 compelled the NPA to comply with an earlier court order requiring it to provide the spy tapes to the DA. In October 2014, the Sunday Times made part of the spy tapes transcripts public for the first time, having been granted access to them by the courts. The Pretoria High Court and Supreme Court of Appeal both ultimately found that Mpshe's decision to drop the charges against Zuma had been irrational and should be reconsidered.
