= Schabir Shaik =

South African businessman and convicted fraudster

Schabir Shaik (born 1956 or 1957) is a South African businessman from Berea, Durban, who rose to prominence due to his close association with former South African President Jacob Zuma during Zuma's time as Deputy President. On 2 June 2005, he was found guilty of corruption and fraud, which also led to Zuma's dismissal by then President Thabo Mbeki.

== Early life and career ==
Shaik was born in Johannesburg in the former Transvaal and grew up in Greenwood Park in Durban in the former Natal province. His father was an Indian South African from Pietermaritzburg in Natal; his mother was half-white and died in a car accident when he was a child. He is one of six brothers – his elder brothers are Salim and Faisal, and his younger brothers are Yunus, Moe, and Chippy – and also has a sister. In the early 1980s, his brother Yunus recruited him into an underground cell of the anti-apartheid African National Congress (ANC). In later years, his work for the ANC reportedly included transferring donor funds from London to South Africa.

At the same time, Shaik worked as a lecturer in the electrical engineering department at Peninsula Techikon until he resigned in 1986 because the institution raised questions about the veracity of his claim to hold a Hawaiian degree certificate. He pursued a Master's diploma in engineering at the ML Sultan Technikon but left in 1990 after he was suspended for one year because, according to the institution, he cheated on an exam.

== Post-apartheid career ==
=== Nkobi Holdings ===
After the ANC was unbanned by the apartheid government in 1990, Shaik became an adviser to Thomas Nkobi, who at the time was ANC Treasurer-General. In early 1995, the year after apartheid ended, Shaik founded Nkobi Holdings and Nkobi Investments, named after Thomas Nkobi, who had recently died. Shaik had initially claimed that the Nkobi family trust held shares in Nkobi Holdings, justifying his use of Nkobi's name; the Nkobi family denied that they held such shares or that any such family trust existed.

Shaik's companies were based in the new province of KwaZulu-Natal and ultimately encompassed broad interests in defence, information technology, and infrastructure. Several sources told the Mail & Guardian that during the mid-1990s Shaik attempted to use his ANC affiliation to further his business interests. Shaik later said that he and Nkobi had admired Malaysia's bumiputera economic policy and that the Malaysian policy had inspired him to offer the ANC shares in his companies, an offer rejected by the ANC in 1995.

==== Transport contracts ====
Under Mac Maharaj, who was Minister of Transport from 1994 to 1999, the Department of Transport granted a R264-million contract to Prodiba, a consortium of companies which included a stake for Thomson-CSF (now Thales) and a 33 per cent stake for an Nkobi Holdings subsidiary called KobiTech. The contract was to produce South African driving licenses in a new card format and it was cancelled in 2013, although KobiTech was expelled from the consortium before then in 2007. During Maharaj's tenure, another major contract – dealing with upgrades to the N3 highway – was granted to another consortium, the N3 Toll Road Consortium, of which Nkobi was a member. The Scorpions investigated Maharaj for several years on suspicion that the transport contracts had been granted improperly.

==== Arms Deal contracts ====
Shaik's relationship with Thomson-CSF extended beyond their partnership in the driving license consortium. Nkobi Investments owned shares in Thomson-CSF and in Thomson-CSF Holdings, a joint venture with Thomson incorporated inside South Africa. He also had a significant stake in Altech Defence Systems (ADS, later renamed African Defence Systems), which Thomson-CSF acquired between April 1998 and February 1999. In the latter half of the 1990s, Shaik held directorships at Thomson-CSF, Thomson-CSF Holdings, Nkobi Holdings, Nkobi Investments, and ADS. Shaik thus acquired a substantial interest in the 1999 Arms Deal, a major defence procurement project of the South African government: both Thomson and ADS submitted bids for several defence contracts under the deal. Ultimately, when the deal was finalised in 1999, both companies were awarded subcontracts for the four Valour-class frigates which were to be procured for the South African Navy – in the case of Thomson-CSF, the subcontract was to provide the combat suites for the frigates.

=== Relationship to Jacob Zuma ===
Shaik was a personal friend of Jacob Zuma, an ANC stalwart who had known Shaik and his brothers during apartheid and who was appointed Deputy President of South Africa in 1999. In 2002, a Zuma spokesman said that their friendship was rooted in their shared experiences in the ANC in the 1980s. By that time, Shaik was also Zuma's personal financial adviser.

In May 2002, Shaik appeared in court on charges that he illegally possessed classified minutes of President Thabo Mbeki's cabinet; the documents were seized in a Scorpions raid.

He had a long-standing friendship with Jacob Zuma, who needed assistance with his finances after returning from political exile in Mozambique in 1990. Zuma had been elected Chairperson of the African National Congress, and Shaik assisted him financially, mostly in the form of interest-free loans with no date of repayment.

Nkobi Holdings was initially wholly owned by Shaik. The shareholding went through various permutations subsequently, however Shaik was at all relevant times a director of, and exercised effective control over, all the corporate entities within the Nkobi group.

His brother, Chippy Shaik, was in charge of arms acquisition at the Department of Defence, which allowed Shaik to bid on a lucrative contract to supply Valour class patrol corvettes to the South African Navy.

== Fraud and corruption ==
By 2002, Shaik was under investigation by the Scorpions in connection with his relationship to Zuma and Thales. He was put on trial for fraud and corruption at the Durban High Court from 11 October 2004. During the course of the trial, Shaik admitted that he falsified his qualifications and business achievements.

The trial ended on 4 May 2005, with Judge Hilary Squires delivering his verdict on 2 June. Shaik was found guilty on two counts of corruption and one count of fraud, with judge Squires stating in his 165-page verdict that there was "overwhelming" evidence of a corrupt relationship between Shaik and Zuma. The fraud charge related to testimony by Ahmed Paruk, Shaik's auditor, that Shaik held a meeting with him and Shaik's financial manager, where it was agreed that false journal entries be made to alter Nkobi Holdings' financial statements. The second corruption charge relates to alleged attempts to solicit a bribe to Zuma from Thomson CSF.

On 8 June 2005 he was sentenced to 15 years' imprisonment on each of the two counts of corruption, as well as 3 years on the count of fraud. The sentences were to run concurrently, giving him an effective 15-year prison term. He was given leave to appeal against his sentence on 26 July; his bail was extended until then. His appeal to the Supreme Court of Appeal failed on 6 November 2006.

As a consequence of the ruling, Zuma was dismissed from his post as deputy president by President Thabo Mbeki on 14 June 2005.

On 2 October 2007, Shaik's appeal to the Constitutional Court of his conviction and sentence for corruption and fraud was turned down, with the court ruling that "An appeal against conviction and sentence does not bear any reasonable prospect of success".

However, the court ruled that there might be a constitutional issue related to the seizure of assets belonging to him and his company, and granted leave to appeal on that point. The court dismissed this appeal in April 2008.

== Parole ==
On 3 March 2009 Shaik was released on medical parole, after serving two years and four months of his 15-year prison term. The head of cardiology at Inkosi Albert Lutuli hospital in Durban, Professor DP Naidoo, personally discharged Shaik in December 2008 because he was considered well enough to leave. However, Shaik remained in the ward until his parole. There have been several accusations of Shaik violating the terms of his parole – including staying at Thanda Private Game Reserve for three nights in June 2009. The Department of Correctional Services said Shaik's parole officer had given him permission to recuperate in a luxury lodge.

== References in popular culture ==
In November 2006 the South African comic strip Madam & Eve ran a series of strips lampooning Shaik's arrival in prison, followed in March 2009 by a series lampooning Shaik's dismissal.

== See also ==
- Moe Shaik
