= Council for the Advancement of the South African Constitution =

South African civil society organisation

- Abbreviation: CASAC
- Established: September 16, 2010; 15 years ago
- Type: Public benefit organisation
- Purpose: Constitutional democracy
- Headquarters: Mowbray, Cape Town
- Region served: South Africa
- Chairperson: Russel Ally
- Executive secretary: Lawson Naidoo
- Budget: ZAR R3.3 million (2023)
- Website: casac.org.za

The Council for the Advancement of the South African Constitution (CASAC) is a South African civil society organisation that aims to promote progressive constitutionalism and the advancement of constitutional democracy. Founded in September 2010, it engages in strategic public interest litigation, research, and public advocacy.

== Foundation ==
CASAC was launched during an event at Liliesleaf Farm in Rivonia on 16 September 2010. According to its founders, the idea for the organisation was born at a dinner between Kader Asmal, Geoff Budlender, Mamphela Ramphele, and Richard Calland in Cape Town in 2009, and the organisation incubated at Calland's Democratic Governance and Rights Unit, based at the University of Cape Town, until its official launch.

CASAC's founding advisory council comprised 33 lawyers, activists, and academics, including Budlender, Calland, Cathi Albertyn, Pierre de Vos, Adam Habib, Frene Ginwala, Mazibuko Jara, Tshepo Madlingozi, Lawson Naidoo, Tembeka Ngcukaitobi, Vusi Pikoli, Wim Trengove, and Hugh Corder. Its founding chairman was Sipho Pityana, who introduced the organisation at Liliesleaf with a speech warning against "a conservative assault on the constitution from the very powerful in our society".

Founded at an early stage of Jacob Zuma's presidency, CASAC became particularly active in advocacy around political corruption and judicial appointments. In March 2011, Zuma's government released an official press statement questioning CASAC's "intentions" and criticizing its "insinuations that South Africa is nearing... a dysfunctional state".

== Litigation ==
In addition to serving as amicus curiae in various cases, CASAC has brought major lawsuits against government defendants, notably including Corruption Watch v President, on the independence of the National Prosecuting Authority.

== Governance ==
CASAC is led by an executive committee and advisory council. Its current heads are chairperson Russel Ally and executive secretary Lawson Naidoo.

In the financial year ending February 2023, CASAC was founded by some R3.3 million in grants and donations. Major donors included ABSA, the Millennium Trust, the Sigrid Rausing Trust, the Oppenheimer Memorial Trust, and the Royal Netherlands Embassy.

== Controversy ==
In 2017, several civil society activists – including the directors of Equal Education, Ndifuna Ukwazi, the Social Justice Coalition, and the Treatment Action Campaign – wrote a letter to the CASAC chairperson raising concerns that two prominent co-founders and executive members of CASAC, Richard Calland and Lawson Naidoo, faced a conflict of interest due to their concurrent roles in a private consulting firm called the Paternoster Group. The Paternoster Group was co-founded by a Lonmin executive and retained several corporate clients which had been accused of involvement in corruption, and the activists suggested that Naidoo and Calland used CASAC to promote their private consulting business.
