= Khayelitsha Commission =

South African commission of inquiry

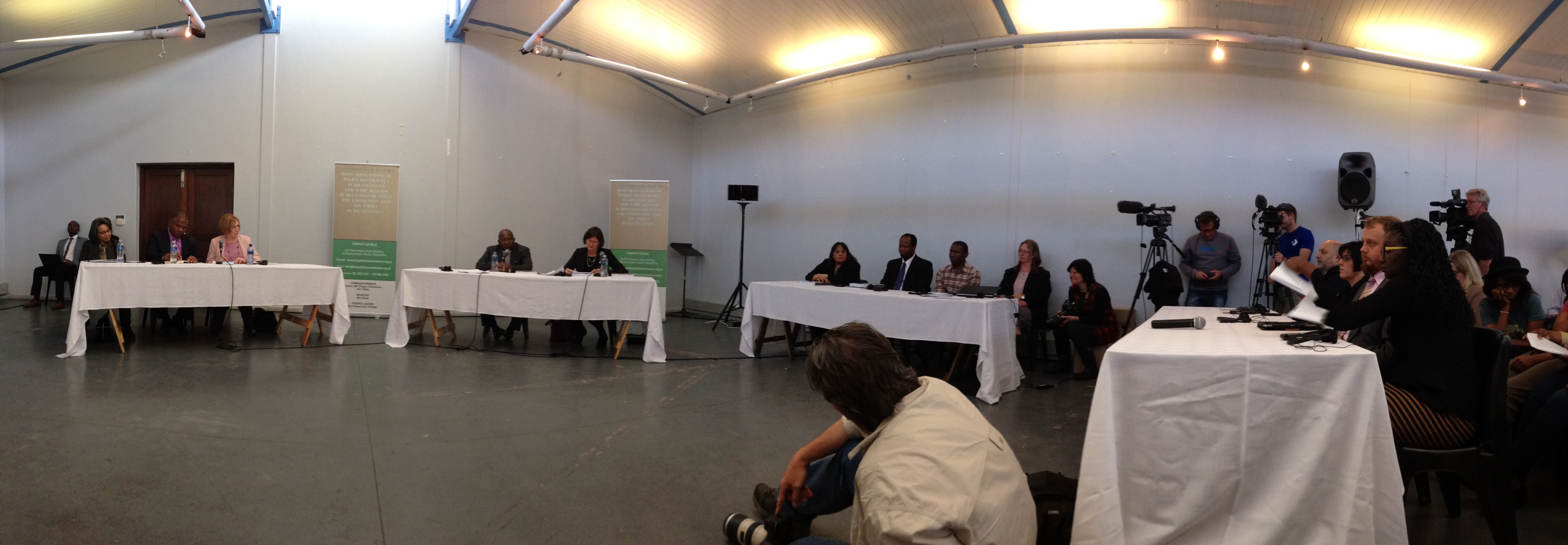
Judge O'Regan, Adv. Pikoli (centre table); Dan Plato and Helen Zille (left table), at the Khayelitsha Commission handover ceremony

The Khayelitsha Commission, also known as the O'Regan/Pikoli Commission, was a commission of inquiry appointed in 2012 by Premier of the Western Cape Helen Zille to investigate allegations of police inefficiency in Khayelitsha and the breakdown in relations between the Khayelitsha community and the police. The commissioners were former Constitutional Court Justice Kate O'Regan and former National Director of Public Prosecutions Vusi Pikoli. It published its final report in 2014.

== Background ==
(5) In order to perform the functions set out in subsection (3), a province

a. may investigate, or appoint a commission of inquiry into, any complaints of police inefficiency or a breakdown in relations between the police and any community; and
b. must make recommendations to the Cabinet member responsible for policing.

- Section 206 of the Constitution of South Africa

From 2003 to 2012 community-based organisations in Khayelitsha held over 100 demonstrations, pickets, marches, and submitted numerous petitions and memorandums to various levels of government to improve the situation.

In January 2012 the Social Justice Coalition (SJC) lodged a formal complaint with the Western Cape Government detailing the accusations of SAPS's failures to provide basic policing services to the people of Khayelitsha. The complaint pointed out that reported instances of serious crimes such as murder and attempted murder had increased greatly since 2009 and that most property crimes are not reported due to a lack of trust by the community in the police. Between 2001 and 2009 the number of criminal cases opened against the police increased by 363%. It also included a number of detailed case studies illustrating serious systemic failures in the functioning of the criminal justice system that led to a loss of public trust in the police.

Allegations levelled against the South African Police Service (SAPS) included:

- Discourteous and contemptuous treatment of crime victims.
- Police dockets are often lost resulting in cases being struck off court rolls.
- Consistently unprofessional and/or incomplete investigation procedures.
- Lack of communication between investigating officers and crime victims on the status of cases and legal proceedings.
- Investigating officers routinely do not secure the presence of witnesses at trials resulting in lengthy postponements.
- Lack of protection for witnesses to serious crimes.
- Insufficient visible policing in the area.

The SJC's complaint called for the Premier of the Western Cape Helen Zille to use her constitutional powers to appoint a commission of inquiry. National politics also played a role as the Western Cape province was governed by the Democratic Alliance whilst the national government (which has control over the police) was ruled by the African National Congress.

In August 2012 the Premier established the Commission in terms of section 206(5) of the national constitution in response to complaints from various NGOs. NGOs primarily involved were the Social Justice Coalition, Equal Education, Free Gender, Ndifuna Ukwazi, the Treatment Action Campaign, the Triangle Project and the Women's Legal Centre. The commission was delayed for over a year due to legal action taken by the Minister of Police.

=== Legal challenge and delay ===
In repose to Zille's appointment of the commission, national Minister of Police Nathi Mthethwa filed an application in the Western Cape High Court for an interdict to suspend the inquiry. Mthethwa's counsel argued that the inquiry's terms of reference were vague and the Premier was not entitled to appoint a commission of inquiry with powers of subpoena over the South African Police Service. The case went to the Constitutional Court, which held unanimously that the Premier's decision to establish the commission was constitutional. Deputy Chief Justice Dikgang Moseneke wrote that "the Premier is obliged to take reasonable steps to shield the residents of Khayelitsha from an unrelenting invasion of their fundamental rights because of continued police inefficiency in combating crime and the breakdown of relations between the police and the community."

== Proceedings ==
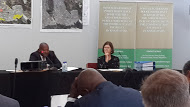
Judge O'Regan (right) and Adv. Pikoli (left) at the Khayelitsha Commission in Cape Town on February 23, 2014

In August 2012 the Commission opened offices in Khayelitsha, inviting members of the public to make statements regarding the policing situation in Khayelitsha. Once the legal challenges were resolved, the Commission began public hearings on 23 January in a community hall in Khayelitsha. The first phase of hearings, investigating the allegations of police inefficiency and the breakdown in community relations, ended on 1 April. The second phase, which will hear evidence from policing experts to help the commission make recommendations, will be held from 12 to 16 May. The deadline for the Commission to submit its report is 11 July 2014 but this was extended and the final report was submitted on 25 August 2014.

=== Evidence presented during the first phase ===
The detective does some very good work, messes up on some things, and then you say "I'm just not going to discipline that detective"; because although technically in terms of every SAPS rule I ought to, it would be unreasonable of me to treat that detective that way.

— Commissioner Justice O’Regan, described the situation that a typical area station commander finds him/herself in.

In the first phase of the commission evidence from 87 witnesses ranging from members of the community, government departments, members of the police force, members of the Community Police Forums, community activists and leaders, as well as 15 experts on the history and nature of crime in Khayelitsha.

From 2003 to 2012 community-based organisations in Khayelitsha have held over 100 demonstrations, pickets, marches, and submitted numerous petitions and memorandums to various levels of government to improve the situation.

In testimony before the Commission, it was revealed that only 23.46% of cases reported to the Harare Police Station in Khayelitsha go to court, and only 3.38% of those cases resulted in a conviction. It was not uncommon for a Khayelitsha based police detective to be responsible for and investigate over one hundred cases at one time. The police station in Harare section of Khayelitsha often carried over as many as 2,300 unresolved cases with a detective-to-citizen ratio of 1:2,626 whilst the ratio in more affluent communities such as Sea Point was 1:435.

During testimony given by Provincial Police Commissioner Arno Lamoer on the situation of the police in Khayelitsha he stated that there is "something fundamentally irrational" about the way in which police resources were allocated by the national head office. It was pointed out that the police undervalued certain important variables that impact police performance such as adequate street-lighting, road infrastructure, formal housing, water and sanitation access. Although Khayelitsha has one of the highest crime rates of any area in South Africa, the police in the area are generally lower-ranked, poorly equipped, few in number, and underqualified. It was also revealed that officers are often reluctant to open cases because it would negatively affect the crime statistics for their precinct.

=== Evidence presented during the second phase ===
In the second phase evidence was heard from 25 expert witnesses and lasted from 12 to 16 May 2014. The focus of the second phase was on submissions from policing experts.

== Findings of the Commission ==
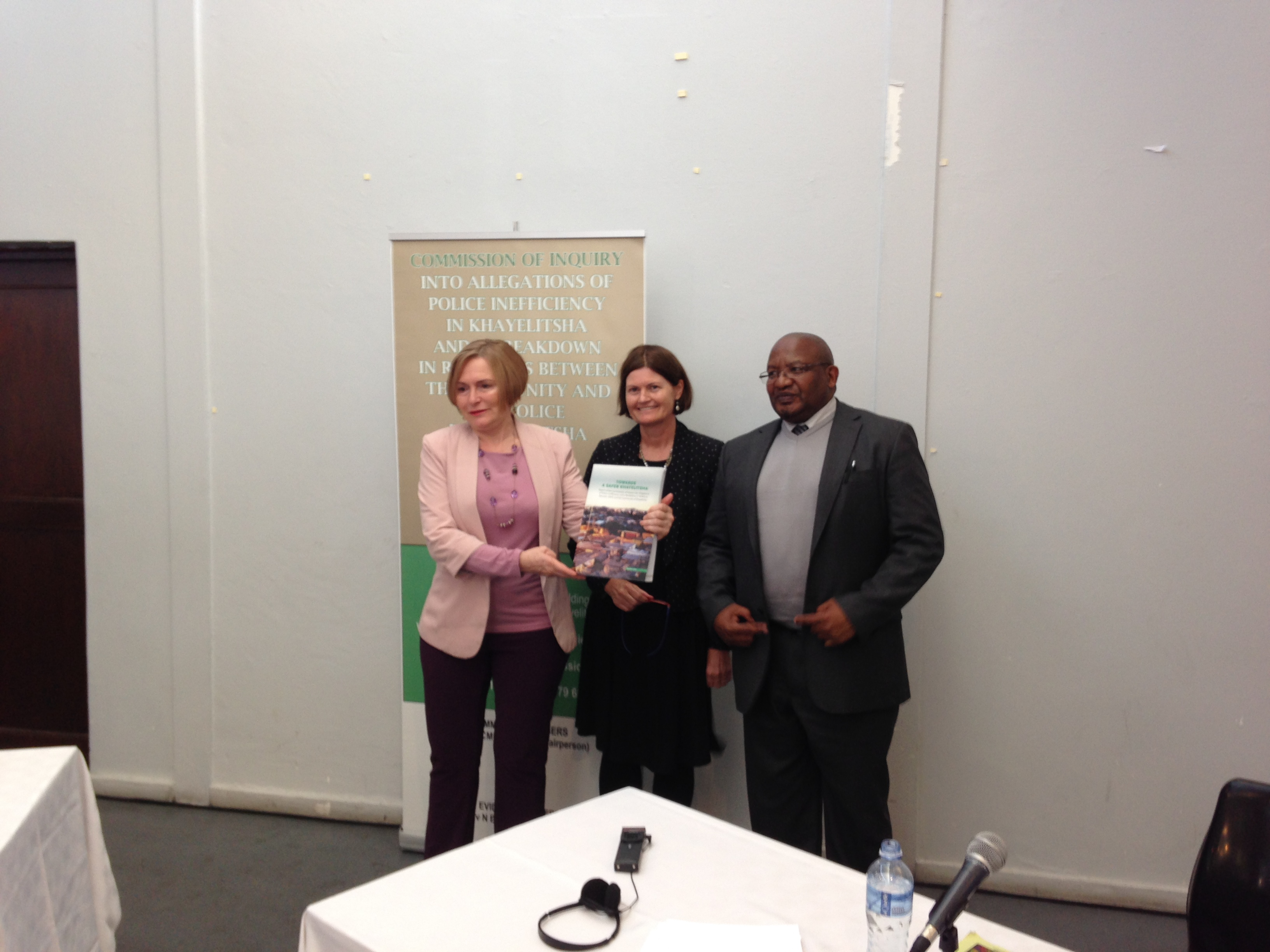
The official handover of the Khayelitsha Commission's findings to the Premier of the Western Cape Helen Zille.

The Commission "concluded that Khayelitsha is a particularly difficult areas to police." That both the legacy of apartheid, in particular the urban and spatial planning of the area by apartheid era officials, and its poverty as well as the community's 'newness' and rapid population growth partly due to rural-urban migration are all causes for this.

The Commission made the following 27 findings and recommendations:

1. Every police station in Khayelitsha should form an agreement with residents guaranteeing minim policing levels, what is a reasonable response time, and what residents can expect from them.
2. Police should treat residents with respect.
3. The establishment of a monitoring team made up of senior police officers and civilians.
4. The number of detectives serving in Khayelitsha needs to be increased.
5. Detectives need to be better trained in the needs of the judicial system when trying cases.
6. SAPS station management should be responsible for resolving identified inefficiencies.
7. SAPS management needs to ensure informal settlements are patrolled.
8. Crime statistics should be published on a monthly basis at police stations.
9. A forum should be established to resolve disputes with the police.
10. Police Reservists need to be recruited for policing the area as soon as possible.
11. All members of SAPS serving in Khayelitsha should be able to speak Xhosa.
12. Police officers should be appropriately disciplined for criminal or negligent behaviour.
13. Recruitment of police officers should be improved.
14. Levels of resident satisfaction should be included when monitoring police performance.
15. Vigilante killings must be recorded as a category of crime.
16. A co-ordinated approach to dealing with youth gangs in the area.
17. More research on community views on unlicensed liquor sales in the area.
18. Train officers on how to deal with domestic violence and more research into the dynamics of domestic violence in the community.
19. Setup a task team to more effectively deploy and integrate information technology by the police.
20. Expand internal investigations beyond just the police station level.
21. Expanding the role of the Civilian Secretariat at a national and provincial level in monitoring the work of the police.
22. The Signing of a memorandum of understanding between the Western Cape Department of Community Safety and SAPS to continue its oversight of the police.
23. Urgently meet with the City of Cape Town, Metro Police and management of SAPS in Khayelitsha on the best way to use CCTV cameras in the area.
24. Improvement of the infrastructure of the Lingelethu West police station.
25. Urgently complete the establishment of a fourth police station at Makhaza staffed with additional police and not police redeployed from elsewhere in Khayelitsha.
26. Urgently resolve the issue of chronic police understaffing.
27. The problem of backlogs in the analysis of forensic samples should be drawn to the attention of the Premier, so that it can be fixed.

== Criticism ==
In August 2013 the provincial branch of the African National Congress (ANC) in the Western Cape criticised the allegedly high cost of the commission when it was announced that it had up to that point cost a total of R13 million to conduct over three years from 2012–15. ANC provincial leader Marius Fransman stated that “We’ve said before what is required in Khayelitsha among others are better street lighting, the alleviation of densely populated formal and informal areas in Khayelitsha, as well as bigger budgets being allocated for proper services.” It has however been pointed out that costs would not have been so high had the national Minister of Police Nathi Mthethwa (an ANC member) not filed for an interdict to suspend the inquiry and take it to the Constitutional Court.

== Impact ==
Although the South African Police Service (SAPS) is not legally obliged to implement the commission’s recommendations it has committed to doing so. In response to repeated requests from civil society, Helen Zille released a 22 page confidential letter from national police commissioner Riah Phiyega. In summarising the contents of the letter Zille stated that Phiyega "“denied, disputed or redirected to the (Western Cape provincial government and the City of Cape Town)” every recommendation" from the commission concerning allegations of police inefficiency in Khayelitsha.

Although most of the commissions rulings focused on SAPS the Western Cape Department of Community Safety (DOCS) has stated that they will ensure evidence gathered as well as the work of the commission will be incorporated into the Western Cape government's crime prevention strategies. DOCS went on to state that it will assist in the establishment and running of an oversight team to monitor the implementation of the commission's findings and recommendations. SAPS is charged with establishing the oversight committee.

Two years after the report was published the Western Cape government issued a progress update on the implementation of the Commission's findings. The update stated that a large number of the 13 findings directly relating to SAPS had not yet been implemented. It also noted that the National Police Minister had still not "formally endorsed" the Commission's findings or responded to any of its recommendations. In 2018, four years after the commission had made its recommendations, the number of murders had increased from 353 in 2014 to 397 whilst the provision of security lighting by the municipality was still inadequate. Five years after the commission had published its findings a fourth police station at Makhaza had still not been built despite the recommendation to do so.
