= Sing (Annie Lennox song) =

Single by Annie Lennox featuring various artists

from the album Songs of Mass Destruction
- Released: 1 December 2007
- Studio: The High Window (Hollywood, California); Westlake (West Hollywood, California)
- Length: 4:48
- Label: RCA
- Songwriter: Annie Lennox
- Producer: Glen Ballard

Annie Lennox singles chronology
"Dark Road" (2007)	"Sing" (2007)	"Many Rivers to Cross" (2008)

Music video
- "Sing" on YouTube

"Sing" is a song recorded by Scottish singer Annie Lennox for her fourth solo studio album, Songs of Mass Destruction (2007). It was released as the second single from the album on 1 December 2007 by RCA Records. Lennox was inspired to write the track after seeing South African activist Zackie Achmat at Nelson Mandela's 46664 HIV/AIDS concert. She wanted the track to be a source of empowerment for people without a voice of their own. It also gave rise to her SING Campaign which aimed to raise funds and awareness for issues surrounding HIV/AIDS. "Sing" was produced by Glen Ballard and interpolates the South African tune "Jikelele"; the music was given to Lennox by an activist group called The Generics.

Lennox personally invited other musicians and singers to work on the track. Ultimately 23 singers were enlisted, who recorded guest vocals on the chorus of the song in different locations. Among them, American singer Madonna also sang the second verse. "Sing" was accompanied by a number of remixes released on the same date. A music video was also released to promote the track. Lennox also performed it throughout the United States as part of her SING campaign. Music critics noted the empowering and anthemic nature of the track, recalling Lennox's previous work. It achieved some commercial success on the UK Singles Chart, as well as the US Adult Contemporary and Dance Club Songs charts. In Lennox's native Scotland, it reached number thirty-three on the Scottish Singles Charts.

== Background and release ==
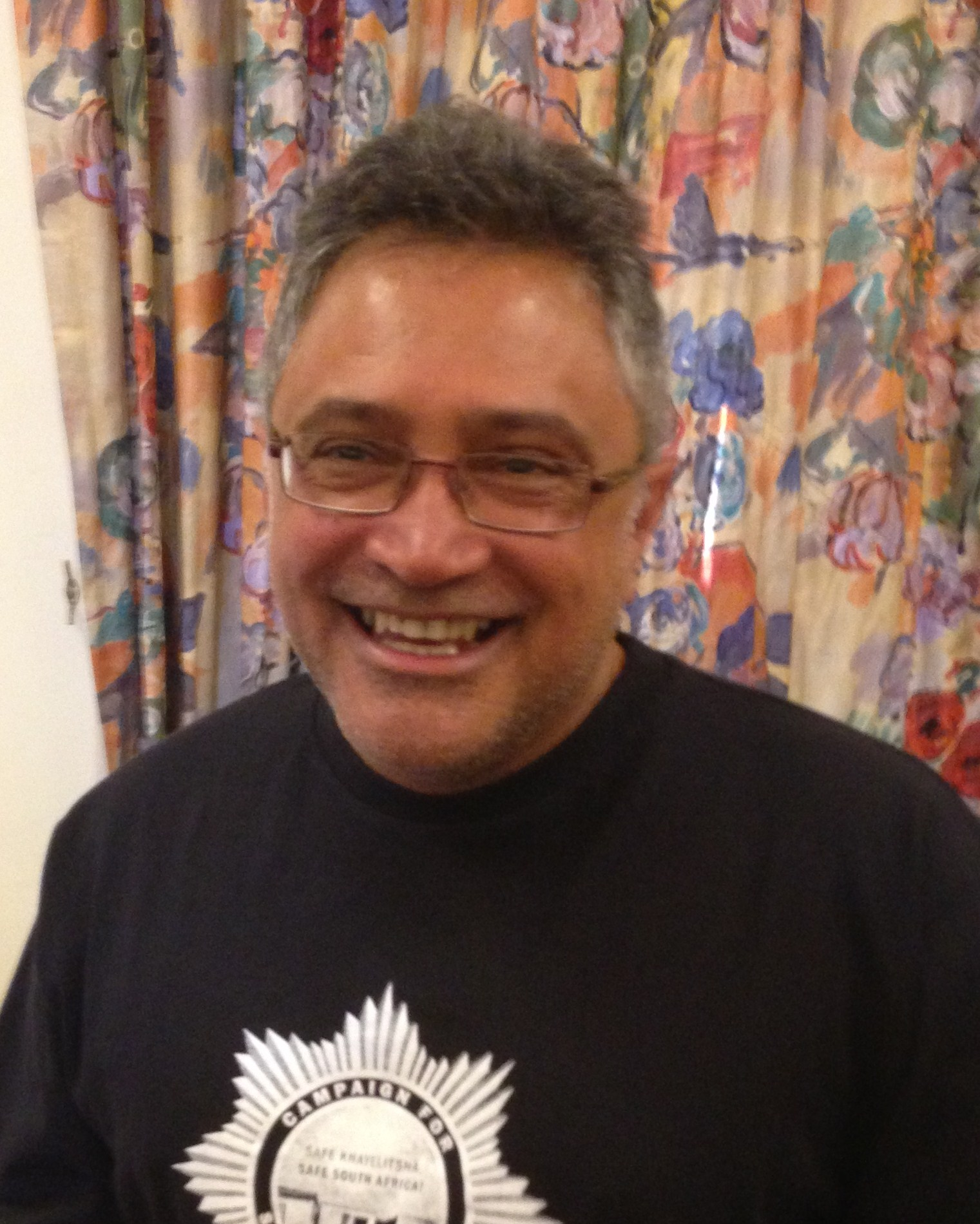
Zackie Achmat was the main inspiration behind "Sing".

Lennox was attending a benefit held by former South African president Nelson Mandela's 46664 HIV/AIDS campaign in 2003. There she was surprised to see a man wearing a black t-shirt with the message "I am HIV positive" written in capital letters. She found it to be a bold statement and inquired about the man, who turned out to be Zackie Achmat, a South African activist, film director, and co-founder of the Treatment Action Campaign (TAC). Although the singer had been associated with the 46664 campaign, being introduced to Achmat gave her an opportunity to do more for the campaign and the project.

We need people like [Achmat], he fights the fight... He refused to take his anti-retroviral medication unless it was made affordable and available to everyone—a hugely courageous thing to do. Before then, I'd been frustrated because I wanted to be more hands-on. I just feel that TAC are doing it where it needs to happen. It really needed to be given support, and I thought that perhaps I might be well-placed to do it.

Lennox was ultimately inspired to develop "Sing" based on Achmat's activism on behalf of HIV and AIDS afflicted people. A group of activists called The Generics had given her a CD of music, and Lennox combined her inspiration and one of the songs from the CD to compose "Sing". It ultimately became a collaboration between Lennox and 23 prominent female singers. Afterwards, it was included on Lennox's fourth solo studio album, Songs of Mass Destruction (2007). "Sing" was released as the second single from the album for digital download on 1 December 2007.

Afterwards, Lennox developed The SING Campaign which aimed to raise funds and awareness for issues surrounding HIV/AIDS. She also wrote on her official website that the song is about raising money and awareness for what she considers to be an HIV/AIDS genocide. Citing Mandela's speech in which he said, "Let us use the universal language of music, to sing out our message around the world", Lennox wanted "Sing" to be an anthem and symbol of unity and empowerment, to help spread awareness in the world. "Because the incidence of HIV AIDS is on the rise for women, especially in the pandemic across the whole of the African continent, I thought perhaps I could be of benefit by writing a song and empowering those women who do not have an international voice," the singer clarified.

== Recording and composition ==
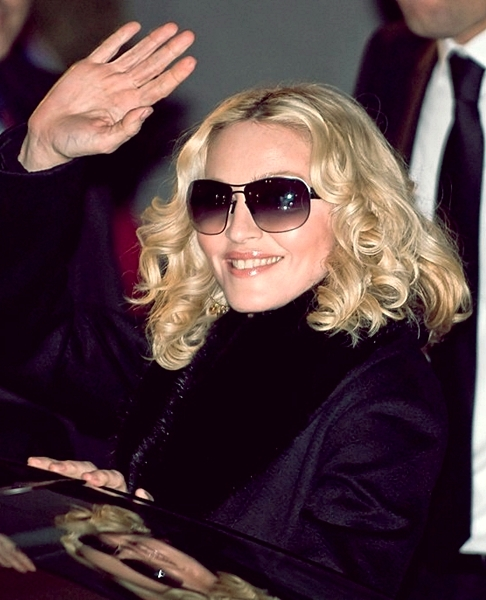
Madonna provided the vocals for the second verse of the song.

"Sing" incorporates the South African activist song "Jikelele", which translates into "global treatment". Developed by The Generics, "Jikelele" was used as theme for Prevention of mother-to-child transmission (PMTCT) programs across South Africa. After writing it, Lennox wanted to ask other renowned artists to contribute vocals to the song. She wrote a generic letter to many and waited for a response. Although some of the artists were not available, many answered in the affirmative, and ultimately 23 singers were enlisted.

"Sing" features" primary vocals by Lennox and American singer Madonna; the latter sings solo on the second verse. Apart from them, the line-up consists of: Anastacia, Isobel Campbell, Dido, Céline Dion, Melissa Etheridge, Fergie, Beth Gibbons, Faith Hill, Angélique Kidjo, Beverley Knight, Gladys Knight, k.d. lang, Sarah McLachlan, Beth Orton, Pink, Bonnie Raitt, Shakira, Shingai Shoniwa, Joss Stone, Sugababes, KT Tunstall and, Martha Wainwright. Since accommodating all the singers would have posed a scheduling challenge, Lennox asked them to contribute vocals on the chorus of the song. When she received the recorded vocals from Madonna, Lennox found that Madonna had not only sung during the chorus, but also contributed by singing the second verse. She "was really touched – for Madonna is very rigorous in what she gets involved in and for her to do that for me, I was thrilled to bits". Lennox also admitted that featuring Madonna would bring a bigger audience for the song, thereby helping the cause. The refrain consists of an "empowering message" with the group of singers belting the line "Sing my sister Sing! / Let your voice be heard" while interpolating "Jikelele" in between. According to Jon Pareles of The New York Times, "Sing" consists of a piano played in the background reminiscent of Marvin Gaye's 1968 single, "I Heard It Through the Grapevine".

In an interview with Performing Songwriter magazine, producer Glen Ballard recalled that he completed the recording of the featured artists in various locations, conducting the sessions through the Integrated Services Digital Network (ISDN): "Shakira in Puerto Rico, Pink in Zurich, Madonna in London etc". Lennox contacted British Indian musician Nitin Sawhney to work on an alternate version of the song. Her official website also announced the release of special remixes of the track on 1 December 2007, with contributions from Moto Blanco, Dean Coleman and Harry "Choo Choo" Romero among others.

== Reception and promotion ==
Thom Jurek from AllMusic described "Sing" as a "huge feminist anthem" and described it as consisting of a "killer hook, a big bad soul/gospel refrain, and a beat that, once it gets into the spine, will not be easily dismissed". Boston Globe's Sarah Rodman compared it to the Eurythmics' 1985 single "Sisters Are Doin' It for Themselves" adding that it carried Lennox's characteristic messages of "optimism and empowerment". Liz Hoggard of The Guardian called the song a "showstopper" and the collaboration as "incandescent". Sal Cinquemani of Slant Magazine also noted the anthemic nature of the track and its "smartly plays more like a broad-spectrum sisters-are-doin’-it-for-themselves" nature, while believing that it would have been better suited as the album's title song than Songs of Mass Destruction. Similar thoughts were echoed by Chris Jones of BBC News who felt that "Sing" was able to "overcome its weighty agenda to take life as a great song in its own right".

Stephen Errity from Hot Press called "Sing" the album's "magnum opus" and a return to Lennox singing torch songs. He described it as a female point of view version of Band Aid's "Feed the World" but felt that the message got lost in the actual "gospel-tinged" composition. A music video for the song was released on the MSN website on 29 November 2007. Lennox toured throughout the United States promoting the SING campaign, and also performed the song.

== Track listing ==
- CD single
1. "Sing" – 4:21
2. "Sing" (Nitin Sawhney remix) – 4:49
- CD maxi single, 12" picture disc
1. "Sing" – 4:21
2. "Sing" (Nitin Sawhney remix) – 4:49
3. "Sing" (Dean Coleman Silent Sound vocal remix) – 6:55
4. "Sing" (Harry "Choo Choo" Romero club remix) – 8:29
- Digital download – Remixes
1. "Sing" (Dean Coleman Silent Sound radio edit) – 4:20
2. "Sing" (Moto Blanco radio remix) – 3:33
3. "Sing" (Harry "Choo Choo" Romero radio mix) – 3:59
4. "Sing" (Harry "Choo Choo" Romero HCCR mix show) – 5:30
5. "Sing" (Moto Blanco Club remix) – 8:35
6. "Sing" (Moto Blanco dub) – 8:26
7. "Sing" (Dean Coleman Silent Sound vocal remix) – 6:54
8. "Sing" (Harry "Choo Choo" Romero club mix) – 8:26

== Credits and personnel ==
- Annie Lennox – vocals, songwriter
- Glen Ballard – record producer
- Mike Stevens – arrangement, additional production
- Ted Jensen – audio mastering
- Tom Lord-Alge – mixing
- The Generics – background vocals
- Allan Martin – design
- Nick Fletcher – photography

Credits adapted from CD single liner notes.

== Charts ==
Chart (2007–08)	Peak position
Russia Airplay (Tophit)	129
Scotland (OCC)	33
UK Singles (OCC)	161
US Adult Contemporary (Billboard)	29
US Dance Club Songs (Billboard)	18
