= List of Constitutional Court opinions of Zak Yacoob =

Zak Yacoob served in the Constitutional Court of South Africa from February 1998 until his retirement at the end of January 2013.

== Majority opinions ==
| No. | Case name | Citation | Notes |
|---|---|---|---|
| 1 | MEC for Development Planning and Local Government, Gauteng v Democratic Party | [1998] ZACC 9 | |
| 2 | Jooste v Score Supermarket Trading | [1998] ZACC 18 | |
| 3 | New National Party v Government | [1999] ZACC 5 | |
| 4 | S v Twala | [1999] ZACC 18 | |
| 5 | Brummer v Gorfil Brothers Investments | [2000] ZACC 3 | |
| 6 | S v Manamela | [2000] ZACC 5 | Co-written with Madala and Sachs. |
| 7 | Government v Grootboom | [2000] ZACC 19 | |
| 8 | Independent Electoral Commission v Langeberg Municipality | [2001] ZACC 23 | |
| 9 | S v Price | [2001] ZACC 1 | |
| 10 | De Beer v North-Central Local Council and South-Central Local Council | [2001] ZACC 9 | |
| 11 | MEC for Local Government and Development Planning, Western Cape v Paarl Poultry Enterprises | [2001] ZACC 7 | |
| 12 | Swartbooi v Brink | [2002] ZACC 25 | |
| 13 | Phillips v Director of Public Prosecutions (Witwatersrand Local Division) | [2003] ZACC 1 | |
| 14 | Swartbooi v Brink (No. 1) | [2003] ZACC 5 | |
| 15 | Swartbooi v Brink (No. 2) | [2003] ZACC 25 | |
| 16 | Lawyers for Human Rights v Minister of Home Affairs | [2004] ZACC 12 | |
| 17 | Mkontwana v Nelson Mandela Metropolitan Municipality | [2004] ZACC 9 | |
| 18 | Director of Public Prosecutions, Cape of Good Hope v Robinson | [2004] ZACC 22 | |
| 19 | Sibiya v Director of Public Prosecutions (Johannesburg High Court) (No. 1) | [2005] ZACC 6 | |
| 20 | Sibiya v Director of Public Prosecutions (Johannesburg High Court) (No. 2) | [2005] ZACC 16 | |
| 21 | AAA Investments v Micro Finance Regulatory Council | [2006] ZACC 9 | |
| 22 | SABC v National Director of Public Prosecutions | [2006] ZACC 15 | Co-written with Langa, Kondile, Madala, Nkabinde, O'Regan and Van Heerden. |
| 23 | Sibiya v Director of Public Prosecutions (Johannesburg High Court) (No. 3) | [2006] ZACC 22 | |
| 24 | Sibiya and Others v Director of Public Prosecutions (Johannesburg High Court) | [2006] ZACC 22 | |
| 25 | S v Shinga; S v O'Connell and Others | [2007] ZACC 3 | |
| 26 | Occupiers of 51 Olivia Road and 197 Main Street v City of Johannesburg | [2008] ZACC 1 | |
| 27 | Njongi v MEC for Welfare, Eastern Cape | [2008] ZACC 4 | |
| 28 | Chagi v Special Investigating Unit | [2008] ZACC 22 | |
| 29 | Cherangani Trade & Invest 107 v Mason | [2011] ZACC 12 | |
| 30 | Aviation Union of South Africa v South African Airways | [2011] ZACC 39 | |
| 31 | Occupiers of Portion R25 of the Farm Mooipaats 355 JR v Golden Thread | [2011] ZACC 35 | |
| 32 | Occupiers of Skurweplaas 353 JR v PPC Aggregate Quarries | [2011] ZACC 36 | |
| 33 | C v Department of Health and Social Development, Gauteng | [2012] ZACC 1 | |
| 34 | SATAWU v Moloto | [2012] ZACC 19 | Co-written by Froneman and Nkabinde. |
| 35 | Democratic Alliance v President | [2012] ZACC 24 | |
| 36 | Motswagae v Rustenburg Local Municipality | [2013] ZACC 1 | |
