= Fig Trees =

- Directed by: John Greyson
- Written by: John Greyson
- Produced by: John Greyson
- Cinematography: Ali Kazimi
- Edited by: Jared Raab
- Music by: David Wall
- Production company: Greyzone
- Release date: February 9, 2009 (Berlinale)
- Running time: 104 minutes
- Country: Canada
- Language: English

Fig Trees is a 2009 Canadian operatic documentary film written and directed by John Greyson. It follows South African AIDS activist Zackie Achmat and Canadian AIDS activist Tim McCaskell as they fight for access to treatment for HIV/AIDS. It was also inspired by Gertrude Stein and Virgil Thomson's opera Four Saints in Three Acts. The film premiered at the 59th Berlin International Film Festival where it won the Teddy Award for Best Documentary.

== Background ==
Zackie Achmat is a South African HIV-positive activist who founded the Treatment Action Campaign in 1998. The organization focuses on access to drug treatment for HIV/AIDS patients who cannot afford private health care. Achmat refused to take medication himself until the South African government made antiretroviral treatments available through public sector hospitals. Tim McCaskell is a Canadian activist who founded the AIDS Action Now! organization, and has campaigned for better access to treatment.

Director John Greyson has been involved in AIDS activism since the 1980s. In 2001, he and musician David Wall had the idea to write an opera about Achmat's treatment strike after a piece on him appeared in The New York Times. The work originally took the form of an eight-part video installation. It was inspired by the 1920s opera Four Saints in Three Acts by Virgil Thomson and Gertrude Stein.

== Content ==
The film features documentary footage and interviews with Achmat and McCaskell, as well as Gugu Dlamini, Stephen Lewis, Simon Nkoli, interspersed with operatic performances. Fictional elements feature Gertrude Stein writing an opera about Achmat and McCaskell. It is narrated by a singing albino squirrel.

== Release and reception ==
Fig Trees premiered at the 59th Berlin International Film Festival (Berlinale) on February 9, 2009. It had been accepted as a rough cut and finished shortly before the festival. It went on to play at the Inside Out Film and Video Festival in Toronto, the Seattle International Film Festival, Outfest, the International Documentary Film Festival Amsterdam, the Paris Gay and Lesbian Film Festival, Watch Docs Film Festival in Poland and the Hamburg Lesbian and Gay Film Festival. It won the Teddy Award for Best Documentary at Berlinale, the Jury Prize at the Hamburg Lesbian and Gay Film Festival and the award for Best Canadian Film or Video at the Inside Out Film and Video Festival.
