= Corruption Watch v President =

South African legal case

- Court: Constitutional Court of South Africa
- Full case name: Corruption Watch NPC and Others v President of the Republic of South Africa and Others; Nxasana v Corruption Watch NPC and Others
- Decided: 13 August 2018
- Docket nos.: CCT 333/17; CCT 13/18
- Citations: [2018] ZACC 23; 2018 (10) BCLR 1179 (CC); 2018 (2) SACR 442 (CC)

Case history
- Prior actions: Corruption Watch NPC and Another v President and Others; Council for the Advancement of the South African Constitution v President and Others [2017] ZAGPPHC 743 in the High Court of South Africa, Gauteng Division

Court membership
- Judges sitting: Froneman J, Jafta J, Khampepe J, Madlanga J, Theron J, Cachalia AJ, Dlodlo AJ, Goliath AJ and Petse AJ

Case opinions
- Section 179(4) of the Constitution provides for the independence of the National Prosecuting Authority. Sections 12(4) and 12(6) of the National Prosecuting Authority Act, 1998 are therefore unconstitutional insofar as they compromise the independence of the National Directors of Public Prosecution. In addition, Mxolisi Nxasana's departure from the office of National Director in exchange for a golden handshake was unconstitutional.
- Decision by: Madlanga J (Cachalia, Dlodlo, Froneman, Goliath, Khampepe and Theron concurring)
- Concur/dissent: Jafta J (Petse concurring)

Keywords
- Golden handshake; executive power; just and equitable remedy; National Director of Public Prosecutions; National Prosecuting Authority Act, 1998; National Prosecuting Authority; prosecutorial independence; section 172(1) of the Constitution; section 179 of the Constitution

Corruption Watch NPC and Others v President of the Republic of South Africa and Others; Nxasana v Corruption Watch NPC and Others is a 2018 decision of the Constitutional Court of South Africa on prosecutorial independence. In a judgment written by Justice Mbuyiseli Madlanga, the court affirmed unanimously that section 179(4) of the Constitution provided for the independence of the National Prosecuting Authority. It therefore held that sections of the National Prosecuting Authority Act, 1998 were unconstitutional insofar as they granted the President discretion over certain aspects of senior prosecutors' terms of employment, thereby compromising prosecutorial independence.

The matter arose from a public scandal surrounding the 2015 departure of Mxolisi Nxasana from the office of the National Director of Public Prosecutions in exchange for a substantial golden handshake. The court was also called to adjudicate the constitutionality of the underlying settlement agreement, which it invalidated on the grounds that such arrangements could compromise prosecutorial independence. However, while invalidating Nxasana's termination and the appointment of his successor, Shaun Abrahams, the court ordered that a new National Director should be appointed, instead of endorsing Nxasana's return to the office. While the court was unanimous on the other legal issues, it was split seven to two on this remedy; Justice Chris Jafta wrote a partly dissenting judgment which argued that, in ordering the appointment of a new National Director, the court risked trenching on the separation of powers.

== Background ==
On 1 October 2013, President Jacob Zuma appointed Mxolisi Nxasana as the National Director of Public Prosecutions (NDPP), the head of the National Prosecuting Authority (NPA). His brief tenure in the NPA coincided with a great deal of internal instability, and in June 2014, Zuma decided to suspend Nxasana from his office, pending the outcome of a commission of inquiry which he intended to institute to investigate Nxasana's fitness to hold office. Neither the suspension nor the inquiry ever took effect, because Nxasana sought to interdict Zuma's decision in the High Court of South Africa and then entered into settlement negotiations with Zuma and his Minister of Justice and Correctional Services. In May 2015, in terms of a settlement agreement, Nxasana vacated his office voluntarily in exchange for a settlement payment of R17.3 million. Zuma controversially appointed Shaun Abrahams to succeed Nxasana as NDPP.

== High Court action ==
Corruption Watch and Freedom Under Law, two non-profit organisations, objected strongly to Nxasana's vacation of office and the settlement payment he received, and they applied to the Pretoria High Court to challenge the lawfulness thereof. Another non-profit organisation, the Council for the Advancement of the South African Constitution (Casac), brought its own application challenging the constitutionality of sections 12(4) and 12(6)of the NPA Act, 1998. Section 12(4) granted the President of South Africa the discretion to extend the term of office of the NDPP or his deputies beyond the retirement age, while section 12(6) granted the President the discretion to provisionally and indefinitely suspend the NDPP and his deputies from office pending an inquiry into their fitness to hold office.

The two applications were consolidated and heard in the High Court in November 2017, and they were granted the following month: the Pretoria bench, led by Judge President Dunstan Mlambo, found that Nxasana's settlement payment and vacation of office were unconstitutional, as were sections 12(4) and 12(6) of the NPA Act. In an extraordinarily intrusive order, the court also agreed with the applicants that the criminal corruption charges against Zuma created a conflict of interest which made it untenable for him to make decisions about the appointment, suspension, or removal of the NDPP; the court ruled that those powers would be vested, for the rest of Zuma's term, in Deputy President Cyril Ramaphosa, who was instructed to appoint a new NDPP to replace Abrahams.

The applicants approached the Constitutional Court of South Africa for confirmation of the High Court's order of constitutional invalidity. At the same time, the third respondent, Nxasana, cross-appealed on a procedural matter – the High Court had refused to condone his late filing of an explanatory affidavit – and the High Court's costs order, while the fourth and seventh respondents, the NPA and Abrahams, cross-appealed against the declaration that Abrahams's appointment as NDPP was invalid. The Helen Suzman Foundation was admitted as amicus curiae. Counsel for the applicants included Matthew Chaskalson SC (for Corruption Watch), Wim Trengove SC (for Freedom under Law), and Geoff Budlender SC (for Casac).

== Holding ==
When the Constitutional Court handed down judgment on 13 August 2018, it agreed unanimously with the High Court that sections 12(4) and 12(6) of the NPA Act were unconstitutional. In a majority judgment written by Justice Mbuyiseli Madlanga, the court held that those provisions, in granting the President certain discretionary powers, threatened the independence of the NDPP's office: while an indefinite suspension could be used to punish non-compliant directors, a term extension (as a perceived benefit) could be used to reward compliant ones. Indeed, Madlanga's judgment was notable primarily for its strong statement on the requirement of prosecutorial independence, which it said was grounded in section 179(4) of the Constitution and buttressed by various institutional protections in the NPA Act.

In this vein, the court held that the settlement agreement between the President and Nxasana had been inconsistent with the NPA Act and, because it had the potential to compromise the independence of the NDPP (since Zuma was "effectively buying Mr Nxasana out of office"), inconsistent with the Constitution. The settlement agreement was therefore invalid, as were the resulting payment of R17.3 to Nxasana and his vacation of the office of the NDPP. These were set aside, as was the appointment of Abrahams to replace Nxasana.

On Mxasana's procedural cross-appeal, the Constitutional Court held that the High Court had misdirected itself on the facts in denying Nxasana condonation for the late filing of his explanatory affidavit; he was granted condonation and his explanatory affidavit was accepted.

== Remedy ==
Having invalidated Nxasana's vacation of office, his settlement payment, and Abrahams's appointment, the majority ordered Nxasana to repay the full amount of the settlement payment and ordered Abrahams to vacate the office of the NDPP. However, the court nonetheless ordered the President to appoint a new NDPP, rather than restore Nxasana to the office. In this it diverted from the default legal position outlined in Steenkamp v Edcon Limited, which entailed that, with the improper conduct having been nullified, the proper remedy was to restore the status quo ante. For the majority, Madlanga wrote that a just remedy in this case would vindicate the rule of law, which required vindicating the integrity and stability of the office of the NDPP, and Nxasana's return would not serve that purpose.

Justice Chris Jafta wrote a separate opinion, in which Acting Justice Xola Petse joined, which concurred with the majority judgment in all respects except the remedy ordered. Jafta favoured restoring the status quo ante, per the Steenkamp principle, and therefore permitting Nxasana's return to office. Per Jafta, if Nxasana were to be removed from office, it should not be by court order but by section 12 of the NPA Act, which prescribes constitutionally valid procedures for such removal; complying with those procedures would respect the separation of powers, enhance the independence of the NPA, and enhance the rule of law.

== See also ==
- Democratic Alliance v President – 2012 decision setting aside the appointment of Nxasana's predecessor, Menzi Simelane
