= Justice Coalition =

Justice Coalition may refer to:

- Justice Coalition (Mongolia), a Mongolian parliamentary coalition in opposition, made up of Mongolian National Democratic Party and Mongolian People's Revolutionary Party
- Social Justice Coalition (South Africa) (SJC), South African community NGO that focuses on campaigning for safety and security
- Social Justice Coalition (Egypt), an earlier electoral alliance in Egypt
