= Sing campaign =

Non-governmental organization

The SING Campaign
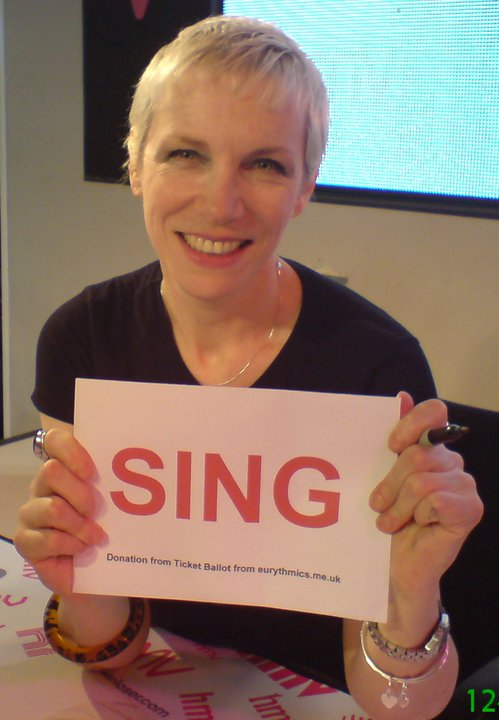
- Annie Lennox, the Founder of The SING
- Formation: December 1, 2007
- Headquarters: London
- Location: United Kingdom
- Official language: English
- Key people: Annie Lennox (Founder, spokesperson)

The SING Campaign is a UK-based, non-governmental, nonprofit organization founded by artist/activist Annie Lennox which aims to raise funds and awareness for issues surrounding HIV/AIDS. The money raised by SING is used to help prevent the spread of HIV in South Africa, and also to support those currently living with HIV. Comic Relief manages the SING fund, and assists in co-ordinating the SING campaign.

== History ==
In 2003, Annie Lennox and David A. Stewart were invited to perform at the series of the 46664 charity concerts. The event took place in Cape Town, South Africa, where Lennox would realise the scale of the HIV/AIDS problem in the country.

In the spring of 2007, Annie Lennox invited 23 of the most internationally acclaimed female artists including Madonna, Celine Dion, Joss Stone and Pink to record their vocals on the song "Sing". The recording incorporates the South African activist song, "Jikelele", which means "global treatment". "Jikelele" was written and recorded by The Generics, who are all members of the Treatment Action Campaign (TAC), the main beneficiary of SING funds. "Jikelele" calls for the implementation of the Prevention of Mother-to-Child Transmission programme across South Africa.

The SING Campaign was officially opened on World AIDS Day, December 1, 2007. It raises money via donations and selling merchandise. In addition, Lennox has made several public appearances/performances to raise money for SING and the Treatment Action Campaign. At the 20th anniversary of Elle magazine in Berlin in July 2008, an auction raised €20,000 for the SING campaign. In 2009, Idol Gives Back, the charity spin-off of American Idol in the United States made a donation of $500,000 directly to TAC after Lennox's appearance on the show.

In October 2010, Lennox announced that sales from her single "Universal Child" would be donated to the Annie Lennox Foundation, which would be used to help fund the SING Campaign. Comic Relief informed that over £1 million has been raised as of October 2010. That included over £100,000 from sales of the "Sing" single and associated merchandise.

== See also ==
- Treatment Action Campaign
- UNAIDS
