= Progressive ANC Voters Network =

Sub-party voting bloc organization

The Progressive ANC Voters Network (PAVN) is a sub-party voting bloc organization that was formed by AIDS activist Zackie Achmat and other card-carrying members of the African National Congress on March 28, 2007. It is meant to push for greater representation and furtherance of progressivist ideals within the party.

== Criticism ==
The creation of the network was initially criticized by leaders of the ANC and the South African Communist Party. However, the network's invitation to the President and NEC of the ANC received a reply from the office of then-Secretary-General Kgalema Motlanthe (later ANC Deputy President and then President of South Africa) which indicated his support for the organization.
