= Corruption Watch =

Corruption Watch may refer to the following:

- Corruption Watch (South Africa), South African non-governmental organization
- Indonesia Corruption Watch, Indonesian non-governmental organization
- Corruption Watch v President, a 2018 decision of the Constitutional Court of South Africa
