= Mxolisi Nxasana =

National Director of Public Prosecutions in South Africa

Director of National Prosecuting Authority
- In office August 2013 – 2015
- President: Jacob Zuma
- Preceded by: Nomgcobo Jiba
- Succeeded by: Shaun Abrahams

Personal details
- Born: Mxolisi Sandile Oliver Nxasana
- Education: University of Durban-Westville; University of Zululand; University of the Witwatersrand
- Occupation: Attorney

Mxolisi Sandile Oliver Nxasana was the National Director of Public Prosecutions (NDPP) in South Africa, the head of the National Prosecuting Authority. In August 2013 he was appointed NDPP by President Jacob Zuma effective from 1 October 2013. After a protracted enquiry into his fitness to hold office, Nxasana agreed to step down from his position as NDPP on 31 May 2015, effective from 1 June 2015.

Nxasana has a MA in Philosophy from the University of Durban-Westville, a B.Proc degree from the University of Zululand and completed his LLB qualification at the University of the Witwatersrand in 1995. Prior to his appointment as NDPP, he was a practising attorney in KwaZulu-Natal.

Despite delays in being issued security clearance for the NDPP position, Nxasana maintained that he was fit for the office. His security clearance was eventually denied for failing to disclose that in 1985 he had been tried on a murder charge, of which he was acquitted on grounds of self-defence. He did however declare two convictions for assault. On 5 July 2014, President Zuma announced an inquiry to determine whether Nxasana was fit and proper to hold office in terms of section 12(6)(a)(iv) of the National Prosecuting Authority Act, 1998.

In December 2017, the High Court of South Africa ruled that the termination of Nxasana's contract as NDPP had been invalid, and that he had to repay a R17 million payment he received on leaving the post. It was held that Nxasana should have known the payout was unlawful. This order was confirmed in the Constitutional Court of South Africa in Corruption Watch v President.

== Legal experience ==
Nxasana's legal experience includes:

- 1994–1996: Joined Ngubane & Partners in Durban as a candidate attorney and served articles of clerkship
- 1997: Admitted as attorney of the High Court of South Africa
- 2001: Appointed member of the Board of Control for the School for Legal Practice, Durban
- 2007: Served as a member of the focus working group responsible for the drafting of the Legal Services Charter
- 2007: Appointed member of a KwaZulu-Natal Department of Health Tribunal, to investigate the circumstances that led to a strike by nurses
- 2011–2012: Appointed President of the KwaZulu-Natal Law Society
- 2012: Appointed Chairperson of the Durban branch of the South African Black Lawyers Association
