= Menzi Simelane =

South African advocate (born 1970)

Director of National Prosecuting Authority
- In office 2009–2012
- President: Jacob Gedleyihlekisa Zuma
- Preceded by: Mokotedi Mpshe (acting)
- Succeeded by: Nomgcobo Jiba

Personal details
- Born: 1970 (age 55–56)
- Education: University of Natal

Menzi Simelane is a South African advocate. He was appointed by Jacob Zuma as director of the South African National Prosecuting Authority in December 2009. His predecessor was Vusi Pikoli.

== Biography ==
Simelane was born in 1970. He studied at the University of Natal and became an advocate of the High Court in 1996. He was appointed commissioner of the Competition Commission in 1999.

== Appointment controversies ==
Menzi Simelane's appointment has been controversial. Before his appointment, Frene Ginwala led an inquiry into Vusi Pikoli's fitness for office. During her report she strongly criticised Menzi Simelane. The Democratic Alliance opposition party filed a lawsuit in opposition to his appointment. Archbishop Desmond Tutu described the appointment as an "aberration".

Simelane has challenged this criticism, arguing that it is driven by people who are hostile towards Black Economic Empowerment.

Justice Minister Jeff Radebe has defended him, as well as the ANC chief whip, Moloto Mathopa.

The Constitutional Court of South Africa, in October 2012, found that his appointment was invalid in the matter of Democratic Alliance v President.

He is currently the subject of investigation by the South African General Council of the Bar.

In December 2012 the NPA announced Simelane was no longer working for them.

In April 2013, Lindiwe Sisulu, Minister of Public Service and Administration, appointed him as her legal advisor. In a judgement (in October 2012) finding him unfit to be appointed as head of the National Prosecuting Authority, Constitutional Court Judge Zak Yacoob said "[We] conclude that the evidence was contradictory and on its face indicative of Mr Simelane's honesty. It raises serious questions about Mr Simelane's conscientiousness, integrity, and credibility."
