= Quackdown =

South African anti-medical fraud website

- Quackdown logo
- Formation: 2011
- Type: Non-profit website
- Location: South Africa
- Official language: English
- Editors: Nathan Geffen, Marcus Low
- Affiliations: Treatment Action Campaign; Community Media Trust
- Website: quackdown.info
- Remarks: inactive

Quackdown is a South Africa-based website aimed at exposing fraudulent and untested medical treatments. It hosts the "Quackbase" database of untested medical claims and publishes articles on quackery.

== Overview ==
Quackdown is a joint project of the Treatment Action Campaign, Community Media Trust and several individuals. It was originally edited by Nathan Geffen, Marcus Low and Catherine Tomlinson, but since December 2012 Catherine Tomlinson is no longer an editor of Quackdown.

In October 2012, the South African medicine company Solal Technologies filed a defamation lawsuit against Kevin Charleston due to a Quackdown article he published that denounces the company's magazine Health Intelligence for quackery and pseudoscience.

As of 2022, the website appears to be inactive as the Quackbase database was last updated in 2012 and the most recent article on the website dated from 2014. In addition, their Twitter account, @quackbase, has not been active since 2012.
