= Selebi =

Selebi can refer to

- Jackie Selebi, former national commissioner of the South African Police Service and president of Interpol
- Selebi-Phikwe, Botswana, a mining town
