= Zak Yacoob =

South African judge

The Honourable Zak Yacoob

Justice of the Constitutional Court
- In office 1 February 1998 – 31 January 2013
- Appointed by: Nelson Mandela
- Succeeded by: Mbuyiseli Madlanga

Personal details
- Born: Zakeria Mohammed Yacoob; 3 March 1948 (age 78) Durban, Natal Province; Union of South Africa
- Party: African National Congress
- Spouse: Anu Yacoob (m. 1970)
- Children: 2, including Seena Yacoob
- Education: University of Durban-Westville

Zakeria Mohammed "Zak" Yacoob (born 3 March 1948) is a retired South African judge who served in the Constitutional Court of South Africa from February 1998 to January 2013. He was appointed to the bench by Nelson Mandela and retired after serving the maximum 15-year term. Before he joined the bench, he was a practising advocate and an anti-apartheid activist.

Yacoob was born in Durban, where he was admitted as an advocate in 1973 and as Senior Counsel in 1991. He rose to prominence representing anti-apartheid activists in public law matters and criminal political trials. At the same time, he was himself active in the Natal Indian Congress, United Democratic Front, and other anti-apartheid organisations. In the 1990s, he was a technical adviser in the post-apartheid constitutional negotiations and a member of the inaugural Independent Electoral Commission before he was appointed to the Constitutional Court.

He is well known for drafting the Constitutional Court's judgement in Grootboom, a landmark socioeconomic rights matter. He is also a prominent disability rights activist, having been blind since infancy.

== Early life and education ==
Yacoob was born on 3 March 1948 in Durban in the former Natal Province. His father was a Muslim cleric and he was classified as Indian under apartheid. At the age of 16 months, he became blind due to meningitis, and from 1956 to 1966, he attended the Arthur Blaxall School for the Blind in Durban.

Thereafter, he attended University College on Durban's Salisbury Island (later the University of Durban-Westville), where he completed a BA in English and private law in 1969 and an LLB in 1972. While a student, he became politically active in the anti-apartheid movement.

== Legal career ==
Yacoob served his pupillage in Durban and was admitted as an advocate of the Supreme Court of South Africa on 12 March 1973. He practised as an advocate for the next 25 years, taking silk in May 1991. Though his practice was generalist, he was best known for his criminal law and public law advocacy on behalf of political prisoners and others affected by apartheid legislation. His notable clients included the Durban Six, the Delmas Treason Triallists (whose defence counsel also included George Bizos and Ismail Mahomed), and Pravin Gordhan and other African National Congress (ANC) members in the Operation Vula trial.

During the same period, Yacoob himself was personally active in the anti-apartheid movement. In 1980, when the Durban Committee of Ten was established amid a wave of local protests and a stringent government response, he became the committee's chairperson. He was a member of the executive of the Durban Detainees' Support Committee from 1981 to 1985 and of the Durban Housing Action Committee from 1982 to 1985. In addition, he was a member of the executive of the Natal Indian Congress from 1981 to 1991, as well as a member of the United Democratic Front's Natal executive and of the ANC's underground structures.

In the 1990s, Yacoob was involved in the post-apartheid transition and drafting of the post-apartheid Constitution, initially as a member of the Technical Committee on Fundamental Rights at the Multi-Party Negotiating Forum. He served on the Independent Electoral Commission from December 1993 to June 1994, and after that he was a member of the Constitutional Assembly's panel of independent experts.

== Constitutional Court: 1998–2013 ==
In 1994, Yacoob applied unsuccessfully for a seat on the inaugural Constitutional Court of South Africa. Four years later, in February 1998, President Nelson Mandela appointed him to the court after the University of Natal nominated him for a new vacancy. He served a full 15-year term on the bench, including a stint as acting Deputy Chief Justice in 2012 while Dikgang Moseneke was on leave. He was a notoriously intimidating figure in the court's hearings, partly because of his impressive power of recall. His handwriting inspired the Constitutional Court's official font.

Despite his role in drafting the Constitution, Yacoob was opposed to an originalist model of judicial interpretation, arguing instead that the Constitution "takes a life unto itself" and is interpreted "in the context and in the time we are in". His most important contribution to the court's jurisprudence was his majority judgement in Government v Grootboom, a landmark 2000 case which established the justiciability of socioeconomic rights. He also wrote the court's majority judgement in Democratic Alliance v President, a politically sensitive 2012 matter in which the court overturned the appointment of Menzi Simelane as National Director of Public Prosecutions.

After 15 years on the bench, Yacoob retired at the end of January 2013. He was succeeded by Mbuyiseli Madlanga later that year.

== Retirement ==
In his retirement, Yacoob continued his public service in various capacities. In 2014, he led an independent "fact-finding" inquiry into allegations of serious misconduct at the National Prosecuting Authority, publishing damning findings against prosecutors Nomgcobo Jiba and Lawrence Mrwebi. The following year, he was the head of a Hague-based panel of international judges who conducted the International People's Tribunal on the 1965 mass killings in Indonesia, and in 2018, he chaired South Africa's People Tribunal on Economic Crimes, which was mandated to probe apartheid-era economic crimes as well as the post-apartheid Arms Deal and state capture. He also continued his disability activism – having formerly served as the chairperson of the South African National Council for the Blind, he remained active in the leadership of the KwaZulu-Natal Blind and Deaf Society – and his activism on socioeconomic rights.

Meanwhile, during the presidency of Jacob Zuma, Yacoob publicly clashed with the ANC leadership. In April 2016, following the Constitutional Court's judgement on the Nkandla saga in Economic Freedom Fighters v Speaker, Yacoob was among the anti-apartheid stalwarts who called publicly for Zuma to resign; he said that Zuma had "acted miserably, dishonestly and horribly".

== Personal life ==
In 1970, he married Anu Yacoob, with whom he had two children. Their daughter, Seena Yacoob, is an advocate and High Court judge, and their son is a scientist at the Large Hadron Collider.

== See also ==
- List of Constitutional Court opinions of Zak Yacoob
