= Government of the Republic of South Africa v Grootboom =

South African legal case

- Court: Constitutional Court of South Africa
- Full case name: Government of the Republic of South Africa and Others v Grootboom and Others
- Decided: 4 October 2000
- Citations: [2000] ZACC 19, 2001 (1) SA 46 (CC), 2000 (11) BCLR 1169 (CC)

Case history
- Appealed from: Cape Provincial Division

Court membership
- Judges sitting: Chaskalson P, Langa DP, Goldstone, Kriegler, Madala, Mokgoro, Ngcobo, O'Regan, Sachs & Yacoob JJ, Cameron AJ

Case opinions
- Decision by: Yacoob

Government of the Republic of South Africa and Others v Grootboom and Others is an important case in South African law, heard in the Constitutional Court on 11 May 2000, with judgment handed down on 4 October.

== Facts ==
The respondents had been evicted from their informal homes situated on private land earmarked for formal low-cost housing. They applied to a High Court for an order requiring the government to provide them with adequate basic shelter or housing until they obtained permanent accommodation. The High Court held

- that, in terms of the Constitution, the State was obliged to provide rudimentary shelter to children and their parents on demand if the parents were unable to shelter their children;
- that this obligation existed independently of and in addition to the obligation to take reasonable legislative and other measures in terms of the Constitution; and
- that the State was bound to provide this rudimentary shelter irrespective of the availability of resources. The appellants were accordingly ordered by the High Court to provide those among respondents who were children, as well as their parents, with shelter.

The appellants appealed against this decision.

== Arguments ==
The respondents based their claim on two constitutional provisions:

1. section 26 of the Constitution, which provides that everyone has the right of access to adequate housing, thereby imposing an obligation on the State to take reasonable legislative and other measures to ensure the progressive realisation of this right within its available resources; and
2. section 28(1)(c) of the Constitution, which provides that children have the right to shelter.

It was contended that the minimum obligation incurred by the State in terms of section 26 entitled all the respondents, including those adult respondents without children, to shelter, and that the children's unqualified right to shelter included in section 28(1)(c) placed the right of children to that minimum obligation beyond doubt.

In support of their contention that they had complied with the obligation imposed on them by the Constitution, the appellants placed evidence before the court of the legislative and other measures they had adopted concerning housing. The central thrust of the housing development policy evidenced by the legislation and other measures was to provide citizens and permanent residents with access to permanent residential structures with secure tenure, ensuring internal and external privacy, and to provide adequate protection against the elements. In addition, the relevant metropolitan council had formulated a land program specifically to assist the metropolitan local councils to manage the settlement of families in crisis. The program recognised:

- the absence of provision for people living in crisis conditions;
- the unacceptability of having families living in crisis conditions;
- the consequent risk of land invasions; and
- the gap between supply and demand of housing resulting in a delivery crisis.

The primary objective of the program was the release of land for these families in crisis, with services to be upgraded progressively. At the time relevant to the matter, however, the program had not been effected. Counsel for the appellants submitted that section 26 did not require the provision of relief to families in crisis and that in fact, provision for people in desperate need would detract significantly from any integrated housing development.

== Judgment ==
The Constitutional Court held that the issue of whether socio-economic rights are justiciable at all in South Africa is put beyond question by the text of the Constitution as construed in the judgment Ex parte Chairperson of the Constitutional Assembly: In re Certification of the Constitution of the Republic of South Africa. The question of how socio-economic rights were to be enforced, however, was a difficult issue which had to be carefully explored on a case-by-case basis, considering the terms and context of the relevant constitutional provision and its application to the circumstances of the case.

The court found that interpreting a right in its context required the consideration of two types of context. On the one hand, rights had to be understood in their textual setting, which required a consideration of Chapter 2 and the Constitution as a whole. On the other hand, rights also had to be understood in their social and historical context. The right to access to adequate housing could not, therefore, be seen in isolation; it had to be interpreted in the light of its close relationship with the other socio-economic rights, all read together in the setting of the Constitution as a whole.

The court held further that the state was obliged to take positive action to meet the needs of those living in extreme conditions of poverty, homelessness or intolerable housing. The interconnectedness of the rights and the Constitution as a whole had to be taken into account in interpreting the socio-economic rights and, in particular, in determining whether the state had met its obligations in terms of them.

The determination of a minimum obligation in the context of the right to have access to adequate housing presented difficult questions, because the needs were so diverse: Some needed land; others both land and houses; still others financial assistance. The real question in terms of the Constitution was whether the measures taken by the state to realise the right were reasonable. For a person to have access to adequate housing, the court held, there had to be the provision of land, services (such as the provision of water, the removal of sewage and the financing of all these) and a dwelling. The right also suggested that it was not only the state which was responsible for the provision of houses, but that other agents within society had to be enabled by legislative and other measures to provide housing. The state therefore had to create the conditions for access to adequate housing for people at all economic levels of society.

Section 26 as a whole placed at the very least a negative obligation on the state and all other entities and persons to desist from preventing or impairing the right of access to adequate housing. The manner in which the eviction in the present circumstances had been carried out had resulted in a breach of this obligation. Section 26(2) made it clear that the obligation imposed on the state was not an absolute or unqualified one. The extent of the state's obligation was defined by three key elements, which had to be considered separately:

1. the obligation to take reasonable legislative and other measures
2. to achieve the progressive realisation of the right
3. within available resources.

Reasonable legislative and other measures (such as policies and programs) had to be determined in the light of the fact that the Constitution created different spheres of government and allocated powers and functions amongst these spheres, emphasising their obligation to cooperate with one another in carrying out their constitutional tasks. A reasonable housing program, capable of facilitating the realisation of the right, had clearly to allocate responsibilities and tasks to the different spheres of government and ensure that the appropriate financial and human resources were available to implement it. The formation of a program, however, was only the first stage in meeting the state's obligations. The program also had to be reasonably implemented, as failure to do so would not constitute compliance with the state's obligations.

A court would have to enquire as to whether or not the measures adopted had been reasonable. It would be necessary, in doing this, to consider housing problems in their social, economic and historical context, and to consider the capacity of the institutions responsible for implementing a program. A reasonable program had to be balanced and flexible, and to make appropriate provision of attention to housing crises and to short- and medium- and long-term needs. A program excluding a significant segment of society would not be reasonable. Reasonableness also had to be understood in the context of the Bill of Rights as a whole, especially the constitutional requirement that everyone be treated with care and concern and the fundamental constitutional value of human dignity.

The term "progressive realisation" showed that it was contemplated that the right contained in section 26 could not be realised immediately. The goal of the Constitution was, however, that the basic needs of all in the society be effectively met. The requirement of progressive realisation, furthermore, meant that the State had to take steps to achieve this goal. This meant that accessibility had to be progressively facilitated, involving the examination of legal, administrative, operational and financial hurdles which had to be lowered over time. Housing was required to be made accessible not only to a larger number of people, but also to a wider range of people over time.

In not requiring the state to do more than its available resources permitted in respect of its obligation to take the requisite measures, both the content of the obligation in relation to the rate at which it was achieved and the reasonableness of the measures employed to achieve the result were governed by the availability of resources. There was therefore a balance between goal and means. The measures had to be calculated to attain the goal expeditiously and effectively, but the availability of the resources was an important factor in the determination of what was reasonable.

The Housing Act made no express provision to facilitate access to temporary relief for people who had no access to land, no roof over their heads, living in intolerable conditions and in crisis because of natural disasters. These people were in desperate need. The Court accordingly had to decide whether the nationwide housing program was sufficiently flexible to respond to those in desperate need, like the respondents, and cater adequately for immediate and short-term requirements. This had to be done in the context of the scope of the housing problem in the relevant area which had to be addressed. The court also had to consider whether the absence of a component catering for those in desperate need was reasonable in the circumstances.

The absence of a component catering for those in desperate need may have been acceptable if the nationwide housing program would result in affordable houses for most people within a reasonably short time. This was, however, not the case; housing authorities were unable to state when housing would become available to those in desperate need. The immediate crises were accordingly not being met. The consequent pressure on existing settlements resulted in land invasions by those in desperate need, thereby frustrating the attainment of the medium- and long-term objectives of the nationwide housing program. For this reason, the land program had been adopted by the relevant metropolitan council.

The court held that the national government bore the overall responsibility for ensuring that the state complied with the obligations imposed on it by section 26. The land program adopted by the metropolitan council, on the face of it, met the obligation of the state towards persons in the position of the respondents to the extent that the national housing program did not. The existence of the program was, however, only the starting point. Effective implementation of it required at least adequate budgetary support by national government. As at the date of the launch of the application, the state had not been meeting the obligation imposed on it by section 26 within the relevant area. In particular, the programs adopted by the state fell short of the section's requirements, in that no provision was made for relief to categories of people in desperate need. The Constitution obliged the state to act positively to ameliorate these conditions. This obligation was to devise and implement a coherent and co-ordinated program, designed to provide access to housing, healthcare, sufficient food and water and social security to those unable to support themselves and their dependants. The State also had to foster conditions to enable citizens to gain access to land on an equitable basis. Those in need had a corresponding right to demand that this be done. However, section 26 (and also section 28) did not entitle the respondents to claim shelter or housing immediately on demand.

There was an evident overlap, the court found, between the rights created by sections 26 and 27 and those conferred on children by section 28. This overlap was not consistent with the notion that section 28(1)(c) created separate and independent rights for children and their parents. Section 28 as a whole ensured that children were properly cared for by their parents or families, and that they received appropriate alternative care in the absence of family or parental care; it also encapsulated the conception of the scope of care that children were to receive in society. Through legislation and the common law, the obligation to provide shelter in subsection (1)(c) was imposed primarily on the parents or family and only alternatively on the State. The subsection therefore did not create any primary State obligation to provide shelter on demand to parents and their children if the children were being cared for by their parents or families. The State did, however, have to provide the legal and administrative infrastructure necessary to ensure that children were accorded the protection contemplated by section 28. Its obligation in this regard would normally be fulfilled by passing laws creating enforcement mechanisms for the maintenance of children, their protection from maltreatment, abuse, neglect or degradation and other forms of abuse, and in addition providing families with access to land, adequate housing and services.

The court held, accordingly, that a declaratory order should be issued to substitute the High-Court order stipulating that section 26(2) of the Constitution required the state to act to meet the obligation imposed upon it to devise and implement a comprehensive and coordinated program to realise progressively the right of access to adequate housing. This included the obligation to devise, fund, implement and supervise measures to provide relief to those in desperate need within its available resources. The case at hand had brought home "the harsh reality that the Constitution's promise of dignity and equality for all remains for many a distant dream." People should, however, not be impelled by intolerable living conditions to resort to land invasions. Self-help of this kind could not be tolerated, for the unavailability of land suitable for housing development was a key factor in the fight against the country's housing shortage. The judgment of the court was not to be understood as approving any practice of land invasion for the purpose of coercing the State into providing housing on a preferential basis to those who participate in any exercise of this kind. Land invasion was inimical to the systematic provision of adequate housing on a planned basis. The decision in the Cape Provincial Division in Grootboom v Oostenberg Municipality was thus reversed in part.

== See also ==
- Constitution of South Africa
- Irene Grootboom
