= Social Justice Coalition =

Social Justice Coalition may refer to:

- Social Justice Coalition (2014), an Egyptian electoral alliance formed in 2014 for the 2014 parliamentary election
- Social Justice Coalition (2012), an Egyptian electoral alliance formed in 2012 for the 2014 parliamentary election
- Social Justice Coalition (South Africa), a South African NGO
