= Nozuko Majola-Pikoli =

South African civil servant and politician

Member of the National Assembly
- In office 1994–1996

Personal details
- Born: Nozuko Temperance Majola
- Citizenship: South Africa
- Party: Congress of the People; African National Congress
- Spouse: Vusi Pikoli
- Children: Zukiswa Pikoli Phumlani Pikoli Lisolomzi Pikoli

Nozuko Temperance "Girly" Majola-Pikoli (née Majola) is a South African civil servant, businesswoman, and politician. She represented the African National Congress (ANC) in the National Assembly from 1994 until 1996, when she joined the civil service.

== Life and career ==
During apartheid, Majola-Pikoli and her husband lived in exile with the ANC, which was banned inside South Africa. She was active in the ANC Women's Section, the informal substitute for the then-dormant ANC Women's League. She returned to South Africa in 1990.

In South Africa's first post-apartheid elections in 1994, Majola-Pikoli was elected to represent the ANC in the new National Assembly. She did not complete her term in the seat, leaving in 1996 to join the civil service. During the same period, she was among the group of ANC Women's League leaders who obtained a joint stake in Dyambu Holdings, the correctional services company that later became Bosasa.

In early 2000, Majola-Pikoli and Barry Gilder were appointed as the dual deputy directors-general in the National Intelligence Agency. She later trained at the South African National Defence Force college and then took up a position at South African Airways, which she left in 2007 due to ill health.

In late 2008, Majola-Pikoli emerged as a key organiser for the Congress of the People (COPE), an opposition party which had recently been formed as a breakaway from the ANC. She drafted COPE's policy document on the criminal justice system and was elected to the party's 30-member national executive committee when the party was formally launched in December 2008.

== Personal life and family ==
She is married to Vusi Pikoli, a lawyer and former ANC activist who served as head of the National Prosecuting Authority from 2005 to 2007. Their son, author and artist Phumlani Pikoli, died in April 2021.

In October 2009, Majola-Pikoli was named during the criminal trial of former police chief Jackie Selebi, whose prosecution on corruption charges had been spearheaded by her husband. Selebi told the South Gauteng High Court that he was being prosecuted because he had discovered that Pikoli and his predecessor, Bulelani Ngcuka, had improper business dealings; specifically, he alleged that Pikoli had received "material gratification through his wife from the late Brett Kebble/JCI Group in an improper way", insofar as Majola-Pikoli had been given shares in Simmer and Jack, a mining company. Selebi said that he had confronted Pikoli about the "gratification" and that Pikoli had become "very emotional" and told him that Majola-Pikoli was his "Achilles' heel". In another hearing later the same week, Glenn Agliotti confirmed that the Kebble family had given Majola-Pikoli shares worth R20 million.

Pikoli's lawyer denied that the Pikolis had received any gratification, saying that Majola-Pikoli had no business dealings with Kebble and had never owned shares in Simmer & Jack. She owned a two per cent stake in Vulisango Limited, taken up on the invitation of her friend, Lizo Njenje. Vulisango, in turn, owned shares in Simmer and Jack with an estimated value of several million rand.
