= Phumlani Pikoli =

South African author and journalist (1988–2021)

- Born: 1988; Zimbabwe
- Died: 11 April 2021 (aged 32–33)
- Occupations: Writer, multidisciplinary artist
- Notable work: The Fatuous State of Severity, Born Freeloaders
- Parents: Girlie Pikoli; Vusi Pikoli

Phumlani Pikoli (1988 – 11 April 2021) was a Zimbabwean-South African writer and multidisciplinary artist. His body was discovered on 11 April 2021, by his parents after they hadn't heard from him since 9 April 2021.

== Background ==
Pikoli was born in Zimbabwe to Girlie and Vusi Pikoli, who were exiled from South Africa during the Apartheid regime. His family moved back to South Africa when Pikoli was a young child, and eventually settled in Pretoria.

== Creative work ==
Pikoli wrote his first book, The Fatuous State of Severity, whilst recuperating from a depressive episode at a psychiatric clinic. The book contains a collection of short stories and drawings. Pikoli self-published the book in 2016, and it was later republished by Pan Macmillan.

His debut novel, Born Freeloaders, was published by Pan Macmillan in 2019. The title is a play on a common South African slang term, "Born Frees", used to describe the first generation born after the end of Apartheid. Pikoli described the book as exploring "assimilation [and] colonial takeover" amongst the young black middle class in democratic South Africa. The book was awarded the K. Sello Duiker Memorial prize for a debut novel at the South African Literary Awards in 2020.

Pikoli also worked as a multimedia artist in theatre and film. He contributed to Carla Fonseca’s play The Same Pain at the Soweto Theatre. He released a multimedia exhibition based on The Fatuous State of Severity at Johannesburg’s TMRW Gallery and was developing Born Freeloaders into a film with Diprente Films.
