= Democratic Alliance v President =

South African legal case

- Court: Constitutional Court of South Africa
- Full case name: Democratic Alliance v President of the Republic of South Africa and Others
- Decided: 5 October 2012
- Docket nos.: CCT 122/11
- Citations: [2012] ZACC 24; 2012 (12) BCLR 1297 (CC); 2013 (1) SA 248 (CC)

Case history
- Prior actions: Democratic Alliance v President of the Republic of South Africa and Others [2011] ZASCA 241; 2012 (1) SA 417 (SCA); [2012] 1 All SA 243 (SCA); 2012 (3) BCLR 291 (SCA) in the Supreme Court of Appeal
- Appealed from: Democratic Alliance v President of the Republic of South Africa and Others [2010] ZAGPPHC 194 in the High Court of South Africa, Gauteng Division

Court membership
- Judges sitting: Mogoeng CJ, Yacoob ADCJ, Cameron J, Froneman J, Jafta J, Khampepe J, Nkabinde J, Skweyiya J, van der Westhuizen J, Maya AJ and Zondo AJ

Case opinions
- The rationality standard requires that executive decisions must be taken according to a procedure that is rationally related to the purpose for which the executive power was conferred. Because it did not fulfil this standard, the appointment of Menzi Simelane as National Director of Prosecutions was irrational and unconstitutional.
- Decision by: Yacoob ADCJ (Mogoeng, Cameron, Froneman, Jafta, Khampepe, Maya, Nkabinde, Skweyiya and van der Westhuizen concurring)
- Concurrence: Zondo AJ

Keywords
- Executive power; National Prosecuting Authority Act, 1998; National Prosecuting Authority; principle of legality; procedural rationality; rationality; section 179 of the Constitution

Democratic Alliance v President of the Republic of South Africa and Others, often known as Simelane, is a 2012 decision of the Constitutional Court of South Africa which expanded rationality review to include an evaluation of the relationship between the procedure by which, executive decisions are taken and the purpose for which the relevant executive power is conferred. Applying this augmented standard, the court held that President Jacob Zuma had acted irrationally and unconstitutionally in appointing Menzi Simelane as the National Director of Public Prosecutions, given that he had neglected to consider prima facie evidence of dishonesty by Simelane.

== Background and prior actions ==
In 2009, President Jacob Zuma appointed Menzi Simelane as National Director of Public Prosecutions, the head of the National Prosecuting Authority. The Democratic Alliance, South Africa's largest opposition party, objected to the appointment on the grounds that Zuma appeared to have ignored various factors which cast doubt on Simelane's integrity and honesty. Among other things, the Ginwala Commission of Inquiry, chaired by Frene Ginwala, had raised such doubts in its final report. The Ginwala findings had in turn been referred to the Public Service Commission, which had recommended that Simelane should be subject to a disciplinary inquiry, though that recommendation was not enacted.

The Democratic Alliance sought judicial review of Simelane's appointment in the Gauteng High Court, where Van der Byl AJ dismissed their application, finding that the appointment was valid. However, the Supreme Court of Appeal unanimously upheld the party's appeal in December 2011; in a judgment written by Judge Mahomed Navsa, the appellate court found that Simelane's appointment was irrational and therefore unconstitutional. The order of the Supreme Court was referred to the Constitutional Court for confirmation. Counsel included Owen Rogers SC and Anton Katz SC for the applicant, Marumo Moerane SC for the Minister of Justice and Constitutional Development, and David Unterhalter SC and Gcina Malindi SC for Simelane.

== Judgment ==
On 5 October, 2012, the Constitutional Court unanimously confirmed the Supreme Court's order of unconstitutionality. However, in the majority judgment written by Acting Deputy Chief Justice Zak Yacoob, the court diverged from the Supreme Court's reasoning, outlining a more nuanced evaluation of the rationality of Zuma's decision-making process.

It was common cause among the disputants that the exercise of executive power is constrained by the principle of legality, viz. must not exceed the authority conferred by law and must not be misconstrued, and therefore is subject to rational basis review. As Yacoob phrased it, the standard of rationality requires, "that the decision must be rationally related to the purpose for which the power was conferred" and that the "means employed are rationally related to the purpose for which the power was conferred". The court's innovation was to explicate that not only the substance of the decision, but also the process by which the decision was taken, must be rationally related to the purpose for which the power was conferred.

On this basis, the court held, some executive decisions might be irrational not necessarily in substance but because they were reached by irrational processes, including processes which irrationally ignored certain information. Yacoob outlined a three-step test for applying rationality review to executive decision-making processes which ignored certain factors:

The first [step] is whether the factors ignored are relevant; the second requires us to consider whether the failure to consider the material concerned (the means) is rationally related to the purpose for which the power was conferred; and the third, which arises only if the answer to the second stage of the enquiry is negative, is whether ignoring relevant facts is of a kind that colours the entire process with irrationality and thus renders the final decision irrational.

The court's application of this test to Simelane's appointment was structured by section 9(1)(b) of the National Prosecuting Authority Act, 1998, which held that the National Director of Public Prosecutions must "be a fit and proper person, with due regard to his or her experience, conscientiousness and integrity, to be entrusted with the responsibilities of the office concerned." The court interpreted this provision as an objective standard for the exercise of the President's constitutional power to appoint a National Director, and found that, in ignoring prima facie indications of Simelane's dishonesty at the Ginwala Commission, the President had acted inconsistently with the purpose with which he had been entrusted, that of appointing a "fit and proper" person to the office. By these means, the court established that Simelane's appointment was irrational, without considering the fact of the matter as to Simelane's fitness for office.

Acting Justice Raymond Zondo concurred in the substance of Yacoob's judgment but filed a separate opinion to raise a qualification on a minor point. Zondo was concerned that, in outlining Simelane's disciplinary inquiry before the Public Service Commission, the majority judgment implied that the Public Service Commission was not obliged to respect Simelane's audi alteram partem rights. Such a finding would not affect the court's holding in the matter but Zondo did not want to subscribe to it.
