= Land invasion =

Land invasion may refer to:

- Invasion#By land, entry of armed forces into an area by land rather than by sea or air
- Squatting, occupying an abandoned or unoccupied area without permission
- Vertebrate land invasion, the adaptation of aquatic animals to terrestrial life during the Devonian Period
