= Gugu Dlamini =

Gugu Dlamini (1962 – 14 December 1998) was a South African activist from Ntuzuma B (known as KwaMancinza), a township in eastern KwaZulu-Natal province. She was stoned and stabbed to death by her neighbours for "degrading her neighbourhood" after she had admitted on a Zulu language radio on World AIDS Day that she was HIV positive.

Before her death, Dlamini had been a volunteer field worker for the National Association of People Living With H.I.V./AIDS.

== Legacy ==
The Gugu Dlamini Park in downtown Durban was named in her honour on World AIDS Day in 2000.
