= Equal Education =

South African social movement

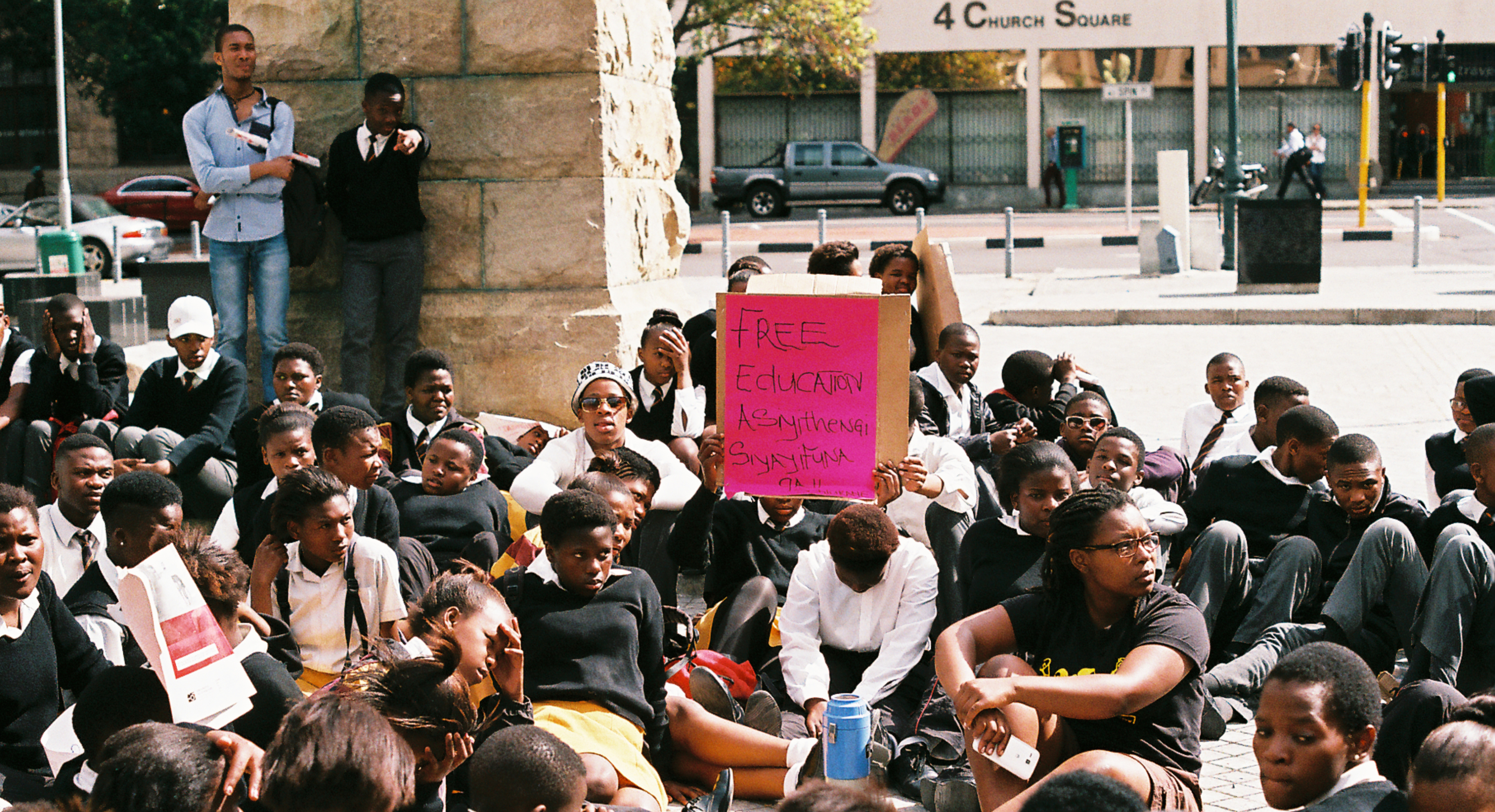
- Formation: 2008
- Type: Social movement
- Headquarters: Khayelitsha, South Africa
- Location: South Africa
- Members: 7032
- Official language: English, isiXhosa
- General secretary: Itumeleng Mothlabane
- Key people: Itumeleng Mothlabane (General Secretary); Nontsikelelo Dlulani (Deputy General Secretary); Zamaswazi Madonsela (Treasurer); Mbekezeli Benjamin (Chairperson); Peter Mwewa (Senior Finance Manager); Samantha Waterhouse (Senior Operations Operations Manager); Mahfouz Raffee (Head of Research); Ayanda Sishi Wigzell (Manager Communications); Bayanda Mazwi (Head of Province: Western Cape); Ona Matshaya (Head of Province: Eastern Cape); Zanele Modise (Head of Province: Limpopo and KwaZulu-Natal); Tevin Mahlangu (Head of Province: Gauteng)
- Staff: 53
- Website: https://equaleducation.org.za/

Equal Education (EE) is a democratic movement of learners, post-school youth, parents and community members striving for quality and equality in the South African education system through activism and research. Equal Education aims to build understanding of the education system, while drawing attention to problems faced by schools and their communities.

== History ==
In 2008, activists and education experts met to discuss issues of inequality in South Africa’s education system. They recognized the need to mobilise communities and organise around key issues centering young people. This vision led to the formation of the democratic, membership-based organisation called Equal Education (EE).

In March 2008, the first youth meeting was held in Khayelitsha with seven students in attendance. Since this initial youth group meeting, the number of members has risen to 6000, who gather every week in five provinces, engaged in political education, and leading the struggle to bring equal and quality education to South Africa.

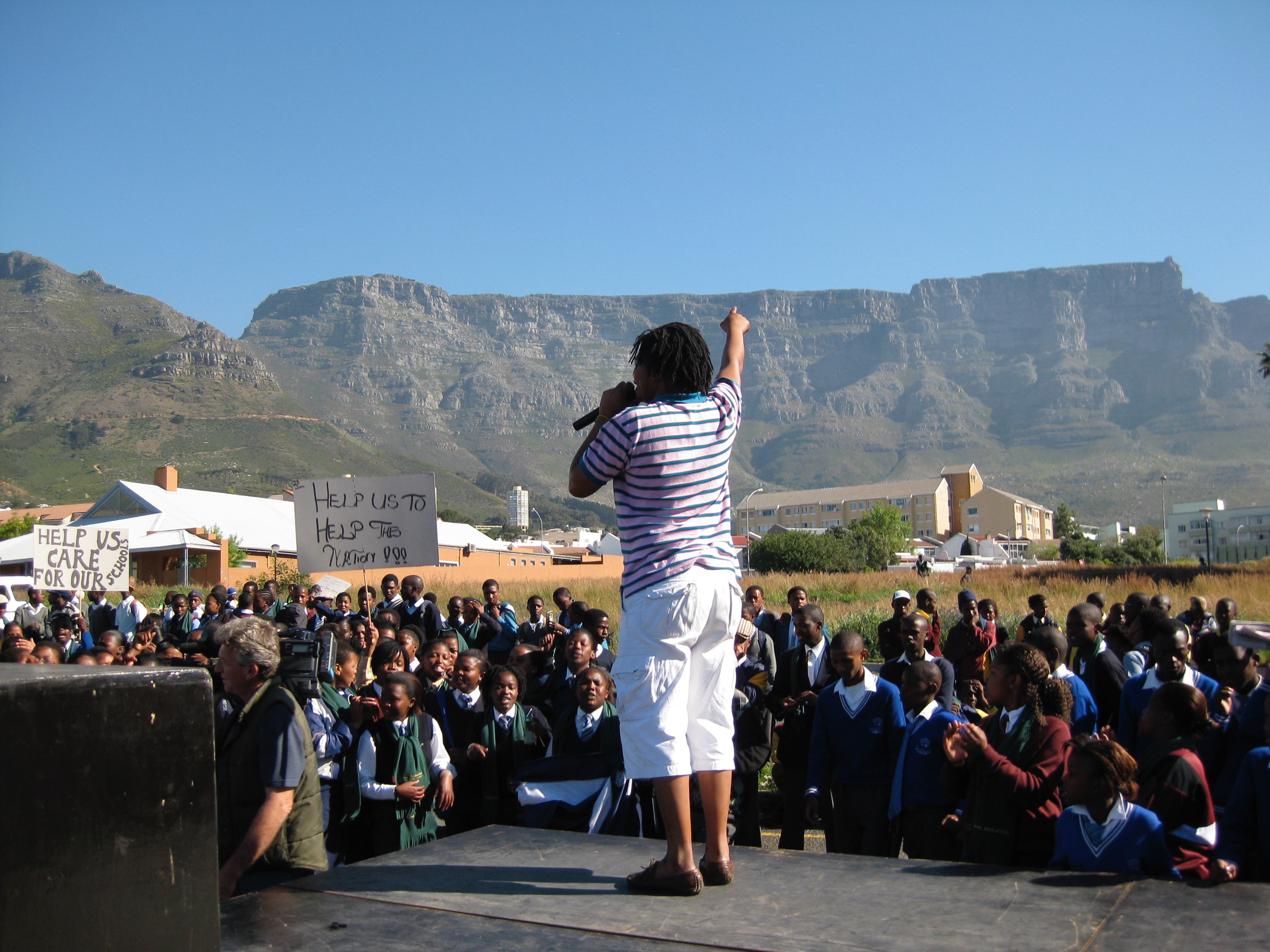
Equal Education members protest for equal and quality education in South Africa

EE first campaigned for repairing Luhlaza Secondary School's 500 damaged windows. Through its grassroots approach and collaboration with experienced activists like Zackie Achmat, EE successfully petitioned the government to fix the windows. Beginning in 2009, EE campaigned for a national policy on school libraries with the aim of one library and librarian for every South African school. By 2011, it sought to have schools' infrastructure fixed, including bathrooms and electricity. According to a case consortium study published by Columbia University, EE transformed into "a nationally recognized activist organization" by 2012, and reached 5,000 members by 2014. EE's strength came from its young participants, primarily secondary school students, as well as people 25 years old or younger.

In 2018, Equal Education celebrated its 10th year of organizing. Over these 10 years, EE has managed to put education on the national agenda, mobilize young people who are directly affected by education challenges, and become one of the leading grassroots voices on education related matters in the country. EE members have marched, written letters, held night vigils, met with government officials and public representatives, advocated in the media, made submissions to Parliament and, where necessary, taken legal action with the assistance of the Equal Education Law Centre (EELC), to deliver major victories for learners across South Africa.

Equal Education has been involved in education activism for fourteen years, leading successful campaigns for school infrastructure, scholar transportation, access to sanitation and libraries.

EE has won tangible victories in schools, securing school infrastructure regulations, billions in government funding for infrastructure, a scholar transport policy and scholar transport to over 3000 learners. EE has defended the rights of students who faced exclusionary policies, and been instrumental to the reform of feeder zone policies which entrench segregation. They have also prevented schools being unlawfully closed, and worked towards schools remaining democratic and inclusive spaces when new school policies are introduced. Additionally, Equal Education has campaigned and secured improvements to countless specific schools across South Africa.

Equal Education recognizes the intersectionality of socio-economic rights; thus, the social movement has joined and contributed to social justice struggles beyond education, defending hard-won democratic and constitutional gains across South Africa.

As a democratic movement, EE’s National Council are elected at a national Congress, held every three years.

=== Sexual harassment controversy ===
In 2018, current and former staff members of Equal Education made allegations of sexual harassment against General Secretary Tshepo Motsepe, co-founder Doron Isaacs and also alleged that board members - Zackie Achmat, Paula Ensor and Nathan Geffen - had participated in a 'cover up'. All those accused were subsequently exonerated by an inquiry headed by retired judge Kathy Satchwell. However, one of the three panel members, former United Nations’ Special Rapporteur on Violence Against Women Rashida Manjoo, distanced herself from the findings and submitted a dissenting report. Motsepe was also cleared in an inquiry established to investigate allegations made against him. None of those against whom allegations were made remained involved in Equal Education.

== Campaigns ==
=== Gauteng: Sanitation Campaign ===
A lack of proper sanitation in schools seriously hinders students’ ability to learn effectively, infringing on their safety and security, causing illness, and violating their dignity. The death of five-year-old Grade R learner Michael Komape at a pit toilet at his school in Chebeng Village, Limpopo, in January 2013 is a tragic reminder of the urgency of improving school sanitation. According to the Department of Basic Education’s National Education Infrastructure Management System (NEIMS) 2014 report, nearly half of all schools use pit toilets, and nearly 500 schools have no sanitation facilities. In August 2013, Equalisers in Tembisa, a township outside of Johannesburg in Gauteng province, launched the Gauteng Sanitation Campaign; they vowed not to stop the campaign until all students enjoyed safe and dignified sanitation facilities in their schools. Since the campaign launch, EE has conducted one of the largest social audits in South Africa, organized a march of 2,000 Equal Education (EE) members, and picketed and protested to improve school infrastructure. The campaign included EE student members (“Equalisers”), EE parent members, churches, and community organizations in over 20 townships in all regions of Gauteng, including Ekurhuleni, Johannesburg, Tshwane, Sedibeng, and the West Rand.

In response to this campaign, the Gauteng Department of Education (GDE) allocated R750 million to fix 578 schools, serving about 500,000 students across the province, and the R150 million initially allocated to upgrade facilities in Tembisa following EE’s demands. In 2014/2015, government contractors fixed or replaced school toilets, taps, pipes, and basins; some schools received new toilet blocks altogether. Politicians and government officials throughout the GDE have spoken out on the need for principals and School Governing Bodies to maintain sanitation facilities better, even issuing a new manual to guide schools on how to do this.

In light of this renewed effort to improve school infrastructure, EE conducted a province-wide audit to evaluate and monitor the implementation of sanitation upgrades by mobilizing community members. In August 2015, community members and organizations partnered and established the Gauteng Education Crisis Coalition. The coalition conducted a social audit over the coming months, reporting their results and recommendations in Fix Our Schools! The Schools Social Audit Summit. The report stated menstrual hygiene as an area of concern, exposing a lack of properly maintained sanitation facilities and freely available feminine hygiene products, resulting in girl learners missing school.

Since the 2014/2015 sanitation facilitation upgrades by the GDE, EE has advocated for improved policy and transparency around school sanitation facilities. In 2018, they published Breaking the Cycle, uncovering the main issues in procuring contractors and maintaining sanitation facilities to improve Gauteng's school infrastructure.

=== Kwazulu Natal: Scholar Transport Campaign ===
In July 2014, Equalisers in Nquthu, KwaZulu Natal, raised long walks to school as an impediment to receiving a quality education. Students, teachers, and administrators identified long distances learners walked to arrive at school as the main cause of tardiness, absenteeism, attention deficit, and lack of retention in schools. Teachers recognized a need for more scholar transport services, resulting in students dropping out, being tired in class, and missing school days. Students weathered rainstorms and violent attacks on the walk to school. On rainy days, teachers said only about 5% to 10% of students attended classes due to a lack of safe and reliable modes of transportation.

Although learners across South Africa face long walks to school, KwaZulu-Natal (KZN) has the greatest need for scholar transport. Around 483,633 learners in KZN walk more than half an hour in one direction to school daily, according to the 2016 General Household Survey by Statistics South Africa (Stats SA). In November 2017, the Department of Basic Education (DBE) reported that KZN plans to transport only 53% of learners needing scholar transport in the 2017/18 financial year, the lowest in the country by far. On average, the remaining provinces will transport 91% of learners in need in the same financial year.

Scholar transport is an important part of the right to basic education. When learners can access free and reliable scholar transport, they can get to school safely and on time and use their energy to concentrate on classes. The shortcoming of KZN Department of Transport (DoT) and KZN Department of Education (DoE) to provide learners with adequate transportation to school safely injures students' access to their constitutionally guaranteed quality education.

Equal Education (EE) and the Equal Education Law Centre (EELC) have been working to provide all qualifying students with access to scholar transport by conducting research, demanding sufficient resolutions from the KZN Department of Transport and KZN Department of Education (DoE) through raising awareness, marching, protesting, picketing, and taking legal action. Equaliser also released a documentary film demonstrating the long walks scholars take to attend schools and the many challenges they face on this road.

=== Western Cape: Safety and Sanitation Campaign ===
Equalizers in youth groups in Khayelitsha, Kraaifontein, Nyanga, Strand, and the Southern Suburbs of Cape Town have organized to remedy and adequately address systemic problems affecting the quality of education they receive at school since 2013. Learners identified rampant problems related to a lack of security at and on the way to school, teacher shortages, discriminatory teenage pregnancy policies, illegal use of corporal punishment, and poor sanitation facilities in schools across the Western Cape. These high school students investigated and raised awareness to mobilize community members to march, protest, and demand action from their education and government officials. Learners recognized that the prevalent issues affecting access to quality education in their communities needed systemic solutions from local and regional education and government authorities. In October 2013, Equalisers conducted an initial investigation of the state of infrastructure conditions at their respective schools by surveying and interviewing their peers and teachers. The findings from this research showed sanitary conditions needed to meet the standards the Western Cape Education Department (WCED) set up. In addition to mass mobilization and organizing strategies to protest and request urgent action from government and education officials, students committed to improving sanitation in schools themselves. In this intense campaign and mobilization period, over 3,000 learners and parents marched on the provincial legislature to deliver a set of demands to the Western Cape MEC for Education, Debbie Debbie Schafer, on 31 October 2014. The combination of localized and regional action won several small victories. However, it proved extremely challenging for the movement to simultaneously develop and sustain powerful campaigns for these many issues.

== See also ==
- Treatment Action Campaign
- Social Justice Coalition
