= Vusi Pikoli =

South African advocate (born 1958)

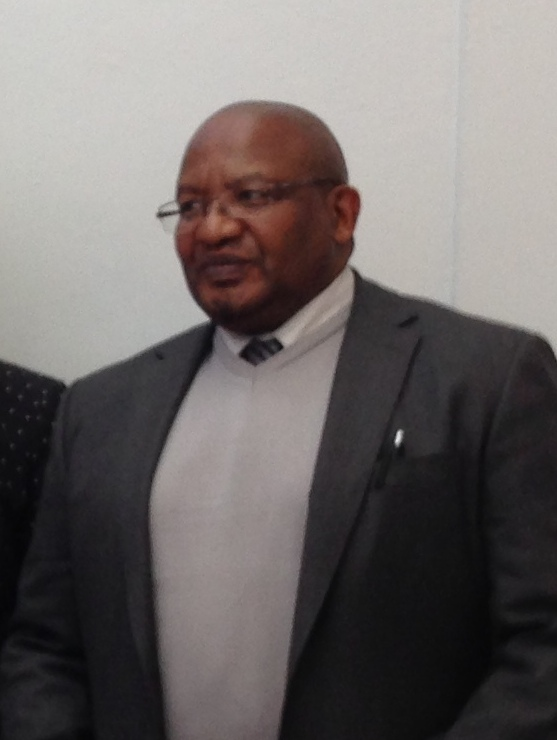
- Pikoli (2014)

Director of National Prosecuting Authority
- In office 2005–2007
- President: Thabo Mbeki
- Preceded by: Bulelani Ngcuka
- Succeeded by: Mokotedi Mpshe (acting)

Personal details
- Born: 29 March 1958 (age 68) Port Elizabeth
- Spouse: Nozuko Majola-Pikoli
- Children: Zukiswa Pikoli Phumlani Pikoli Lisolomzi Pikoli
- Education: National University of Lesotho; University of Zimbabwe

Vusumzi "Vusi" Pikoli (born 29 March 1958 in Port Elizabeth) is a South African advocate and the former head of South Africa's National Prosecuting Authority. He is noted for instigating criminal charges against disgraced South African police commissioner Jackie Selebi and ANC president Jacob Zuma. In 2008 he was suspended from his duties by President Thabo Mbeki, a close confidant of Selebi, and then subsequently fired by Mbeki's successor, Kgalema Motlanthe, who is an ally of Zuma. As such, opposition parties and sections of the press have claimed Pikoli is the victim of two separate political conspiracies. In October 2014 Pikoli was appointed as the Western Cape's first police ombudsman by Premier Helen Zille, whose choice was unanimously backed by the provincial legislature's standing committee on community safety.

== Education ==
Pikoli attended St John's College in Mthatha, enrolled for Bachelor of Laws degree in 1976 at Fort Hare University and later obtained two law degrees from the National University of Lesotho and a MA in law from the University of Zimbabwe in 1988.

As a student he was an active member of the ANC's youth movement, and received military training in Angola as a member of uMkhonto we Sizwe.

== Early career ==
Between 1991 and 1994 he worked in the private legal profession, but became Special Advisor to the Minister of Justice in 1994. He served in that capacity until 1997, when he became Deputy Director-General (Human Resources) in the Department of Justice & Constitutional Development. In 1999 he became Director-General in the same department, a position he held for six years.

== National Director of Public Prosecutions ==
In 2005 he was appointed to head up the National Prosecuting Authority as the National Director of Public Prosecutions.

On 24 September 2007 President Thabo Mbeki suspended Pikoli in terms of Section 12(6)(a) of the National Prosecution Act 32 of 1998, citing an "irretrievable break down in the working relationship between the Minister of Justice and Constitutional Development and the NDPP." Three days later the South African Broadcasting Corporation claimed that a warrant was issued on 10 September by the NPA for the arrest of the head of the South African Police and Interpol, Jackie Selebi – a close confidant of Mbeki. According to SABC the warrant was secured by Pikoli, before Pikoli was suspended by the country's President Mbeki. Journalists at the Mail & Guardian subsequently provided supporting evidence to the claim that Mbeki had suspended Pikoli as part of a bid to shield Police Commissioner Selebi. The leader of South Africa's opposition Democratic Alliance party, Helen Zille, said that the suspension of Pikoli was a "serious development" that needed further explanation: "The country needs to know why Pikoli has been suspended." Human Sciences Research Council political commentator Adam Habib said:

If the president suspended Mr Pikoli on the grounds that he had issued a warrant for the commissioner's arrest, then it suggests that an invasion is being made into an independent institution's operations. Intervening in the operations of the National Prosecuting Authority constitutes a violation of our Constitution.

After Mbeki's resignation from the presidency, his successor Kgalema Motlanthe fired Pikoli. Opposition leader Helen Zille pointed out that even though Motlanthe is a close supporter of Mbeki's political rival Jacob Zuma, Motlanthe had his own reasons for distrusting Pikoli. In particular she claimed that Pikoli's efforts to charge Zuma with corruption made him a target for Motlanthe, and that Pikoli had been both suspended and fired for political reasons.

Pikoli's dismissal would have to be ratified by Parliament. The proceedings got off to a shaky start when the co-chairperson of the ad hoc parliamentary committee dealing with the matter, Oupa Monareng, was revealed to have been convicted of criminal charges in the mid-1990s.

On 11 August 2009 Pikoli was granted an interim interdict by the High Court in Pretoria, which prevents Zuma from appointing a successor to the position. This was until the application could be heard by the same court in November.

On 21 November 2009 the government reached a R7.5 million out-of-court settlement with Pikoli to stop his legal bid for reinstatement.

== Subsequent career ==
From 2012 to 2014 Pikoli served as a commissioner of the Khayelitsha Commission, which investigated the crime and policing situation in Khayelitsha and from 2014 to 2018 as the Western Cape Police Ombudsman western cape provincial govt police-ombudsman. In 2019 he was appointed as the Chief Risk and Compliance Officer at South African Airways.
