= Ndifuna Ukwazi =

South African non-profit organisation

- Founded: 2011; 15 years ago
- Type: Nonprofit organization
- Purpose: Community rights Law centre Activism; Affordable housing Spatial justice
- Headquarters: 18 Roeland Street, Cape Town, South Africa
- Region served: City of Cape Town
- Affiliations: Social Justice Coalition
- Revenue: R6.89 million (2018)
- Expenses: R6.79 million (2018)
- Employees: 17
- Website: nu.org.za

The Ndifuna Ukwazi (NU), translated from isiXhosa: Dare to Know, is a South African non-profit advocacy organisation established in 2011 to advocate for affordable housing in well-located urban spaces. The organisation does this by conducting policy research, community organisation, public advocacy, litigation, and the provision of legal services. Most of the organisation's activities focus on communities within the City of Cape Town.

The organisation has been critical of the City of Cape Town's policies and actions on policing the poor and homeless, evictions, and the sale of City property instead of using it for affordable housing. It has also criticised the South African Police Service (SAPS) and the Department of Defence for its urban housing policies.
