= National Prosecuting Authority Act, 1998 =

South African legislation

Parliament of South Africa
- Long title: Act to regulate matters incidental to the establishment by the Constitution of the Republic of South Africa, 1996, of a single national prosecuting authority; and to provide for matters connected therewith.
- Citation: Act No. 32 of 1998
- Enacted by: Parliament of South Africa
- Assented to: 24 June 1998
- Commenced: 16 October 1998

Summary
- Established the National Prosecuting Authority.
- Status: In force

The National Prosecuting Authority Act, 1998 (Act No. 32 of 1998) is an act of the Parliament of South Africa which established the National Prosecuting Authority (NPA). The creation of the NPA was required by section 179 of the Constitution of South Africa, which came into force in February 1997.

Prior to the passage of the NPA Act, public prosecutions were under the direction of the attorneys-general, with a separate attorney-general appointed by the President for each division of the High Court. The offices of the attorneys-general were merged into a centralised National Prosecuting Authority headed by the National Director of Public Prosecutions, and the various attorneys-general became Directors of Public Prosecutions.

The NPA was established as a single national prosecuting authority in terms of section 179(1) of the Constitution of South Africa 1996, which provides as follows:

“(1) There is a single national prosecuting authority in the Republic, structured in terms of an Act of Parliament, and consisting of: a. a National Director of Public Prosecutions, who is the head of the prosecuting authority, and is appointed by the President, as head of the national executive; and b. Directors of Public Prosecutions and prosecutors as determined by an Act of Parliament. (2) The prosecuting authority has the power to institute criminal proceedings on behalf of the state, and to carry out any necessary functions incidental to instituting criminal proceedings.”

One scholar has commented that “as a representative of the state, the NPA has a special role in our criminal justice system because it has the responsibility of enforcing criminal laws in South Africa by instituting criminal proceedings on behalf of the state.” Although the head of the NPA, the National Director of Public Prosecutions (National Director), is appointed by the President as head of national executive and the NPA forms part of the executive, section 179(4) of the Constitution requires that “national legislation must ensure that the prosecuting authority exercises its functions without fear, favour or prejudice”. In its interpretation of section 179(4), the Constitutional Court of South Africa has said that “there is a constitutional guarantee of independence and any legislative or executive action inconsistent therewith would be subject to constitutional control.”

== Proposed Amendments to the National Prosecuting Authority Act ==
In 2013, Ms Dene Smuts, a member of parliament representing the opposition Democratic Alliance, introduced a private member Bill called the Constitution Eighteenth Amendment Bill [PMB 6 – 2013]. Before it was defeated in the Portfolio Committee on Justice and Constitutional Development, the Bill sought to drastically amend the Constitution of South Africa in matters pertaining to the NPA and the National Prosecuting Authority Act. Specifically, the Bill sought to provide that (1) the President should appoint the National Director on the recommendation and approval of the National Assembly; (2) for the participation of civil society in the nomination of persons for the position of National Director; (3) that the National Director may only be removed from office following a finding of misconduct, incapacity or incompetence and the adoption of a resolution by the National Assembly; (4) removal of clause providing the final responsibility of the cabinet member responsible for the administration of justice over the prosecuting authority; and (5) that the NPA be accountable to the National Assembly. In an article commenting on the Bill, one scholar examines the justifications for the Bill and argues that proponents of the Bill failed to justify on substantive grounds why the Bill was important. The author advances two main arguments against the Bill. Firstly, that the proposition in the Bill is probably contrary to the South African constitutional scheme and that it may not be reconciled with other features or provisions in the Constitution. Secondly, that if approved in its current form the Bill would breach separation of powers.
