= Treatment Action Campaign =

South African HIV/AIDS activist organization

TAC
- Treatment Action Campaign
- Formation: 1998
- Founder: Zackie Achmat
- Founded at: South Africa
- Legal status: Non-governmental organisation
- Services: HIV/AIDS activism

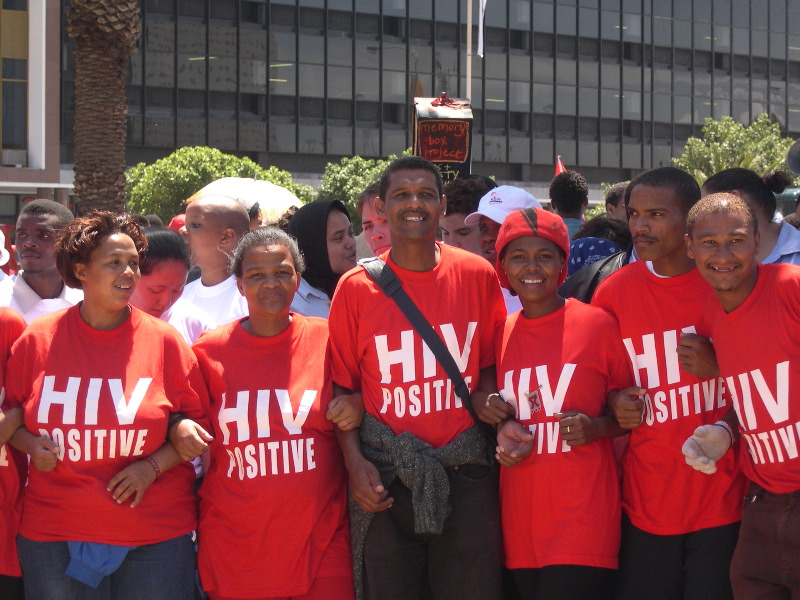
Photo from TAC march on Parliament, February 2003 - photo from Treatment Action Campaign website

The Treatment Action Campaign (TAC) is a South African HIV/AIDS activist organisation which was co-founded by the HIV-positive activist Zackie Achmat in 1998. TAC is rooted in the experiences, direct action tactics and anti-apartheid background of its founder. TAC has been credited with forcing the reluctant government of former South African President Thabo Mbeki to begin making antiretroviral drugs available to South Africans.

== Founding ==
The Treatment Action Campaign (TAC) was launched on 10 December 1998, International Human Rights Day. Zackie Achmat, whom The New Yorker calls "the most important dissident in the country since Nelson Mandela", joined with a group of ten other activists to found the group after anti-apartheid gay rights activist Simon Nkoli died from AIDS even as highly active antiretroviral therapy was available to wealthy South Africans. Shortly thereafter, prompted by the murder of HIV-positive activist Gugu Dlamini, HIV-positive and HIV-negative members of the new group began wearing the group's now-famous T-shirts with the words "HIV Positive" printed boldly in front, a strategy inspired by the apocryphal story of the Danish king wearing the yellow star marking Jews under Nazi occupation. Achmat also became famous for his pledge to not take antiretroviral medicines until all South Africans could obtain them.

Quickly outgrowing its start among a small group of Cape Town activists, a number of whom had political roots in the Marxist Workers Tendency of the ANC, TAC became a much more broadly based group, with chapters in many regions of the nation and a largely black and poor constituency. The group campaigns for greater access to HIV treatment for all South Africans by raising public awareness and understanding about issues surrounding the availability, affordability and use of HIV treatments.

The Treatment Action Campaign produces Equal Treatment, a magazine dedicated to HIV and health issues.

== Suing the government ==
The TAC first confronted the South African government for not ensuring that mother-to-child transmission (MTCT) prevention was available to pregnant mothers. It won this case on the basis of the South African constitutional guarantee of the right to health care, and the government was ordered to provide MTCT programs in public clinics. TAC also assisted the government by defending it in the case brought against the government by the pharmaceutical industry. TAC entered the case as an amicus curiae, submitting a brief in favour of the government's position. Although the withdrawal of the pharmaceutical companies from this case resulted in a government victory, the government showed no interest in providing access to the generic antiretroviral medications that its victory allowed.

Indeed, far from embracing their common victory against the patent rights of multinational companies who were not making affordable drugs available, President Thabo Mbeki began promoting the AIDS denialist view that HIV might not cause AIDS, and that AIDS medications were more toxic than helpful, inviting foreign AIDS denialists to advise his government.

== Campaign for access to antiretrovirals ==
According to TAC's founder, two million South Africans died prematurely of AIDS during the term of former President Mbeki, and many of these deaths could have been prevented by timely implementation of access to anti-HIV drugs.

Following their legal victories, and facing continuing refusal by the government to make antiretrovirals available, TAC began a campaign for universal access to AIDS treatment through the public health system. In a national congress in 2002, the group decided to confront the government on this issue, first enacting a thousands-strong march on Parliament in February 2003, and then beginning a civil disobedience campaign in March 2003. After assurances from people within the government that a treatment plan would be forthcoming, TAC suspended its civil disobedience campaign.

In the summer of 2003, TAC obtained and leaked an internally circulated government report showing that treatment would be cost-effective by reducing costly hospitalisations within the public-sector health system; however, the government did not endorse the report and condemned the leak. In August 2003, at its next annual congress, TAC voted to resume civil disobedience. TAC members also voted to recommend that Achmat take his medications, which he agreed he would do. At the same time, TAC began a Treatment Project to distribute medications to its activists and to other community members.

Shortly after the Congress, and before the civil disobedience campaign resumed, the Cabinet voted to begin roll-out of antiretroviral access through public-sector health clinics. In the South African system, the Cabinet can overrule the President, and it appeared to have done so in this case.

Although the Cabinet voted to reaffirm that South African AIDS policy is based on the evidence that HIV causes AIDS, former President Thabo Mbeki continued to support the AIDS denialist position, as did his Minister of Health, Manto Tshabalala-Msimang. The Minister of Health put special emphasis on nutrition as an alternative to antiretroviral treatment. As the top health official of South Africa, she was a particular target of TAC activism. Tshabalala-Msimang was removed as Health Minister in September 2008 after President Mbeki left office, a move hailed by the Treatment Action Campaign.

Although antiretroviral access is now official policy, its implementation has been spotty. TAC continues to protest and sue the government (working with the AIDS Law Project) in order to continue to influence the speed of and approach to the rollout.

== 2006 IAS Conference and the Global Day of Action ==
At the XVI International AIDS Society Conference in Toronto, 13–18 August 2006, TAC had a significant presence. Many TAC staff presented in seminars and chaired sessions, most prominently TAC Secretary Sipho Mthathi and Treasurer Mark Heywood. Heywood was a panelist in a plenary session co-chaired by CNN's Sanjay Gupta entitled "Time to Deliver: The Price of Inaction". Towards the end of the session, supporters of TAC, many of whom were wearing the distinctive "HIV POSITIVE" T-shirts, took to the stage behind the panel and silently held placards containing messages such as "Fire Manto", in reference to the Health Minister, who was in attendance.

TAC members and supporters also took over the South African government's booth in the exhibitor's area. The booth contained bowls of lemons and garlic, which the Health Minister has claimed contribute to fighting HIV. TAC members passed around these items mockingly, and toyi-toyied inside the booth, attracting attention to the South African government's expenditure on the elaborate booth and lack of corresponding commitment to the national treatment plan.

During the conference's closing ceremonies, United Nations Special Envoy for HIV/AIDS in Africa Stephen Lewis pointed out the failure of South Africa's response to HIV/AIDS, calling their actions more "[more] worthy of a lunatic fringe than of a concerned and compassionate state." He also announced that earlier in the morning, Zackie Achmat and 44 others had been arrested for occupying provincial offices in Cape Town in protest of government's failure to treat prisoners with anti-retrovirals, and in particular the recent death of one plaintiff in the legal case against the government on this matter.

After the conclusion of the conference, TAC declared a Global Day of Action for Thursday, 24 August 2006. Protests and marches were held in the U.S., Canada, Brazil, and China by TAC supporters and sympathisers. In South Africa, police used pepper spray on protesters at the Department of Correctional Services building in central Cape Town, though no one was seriously hurt. Similar protests in Gauteng, Eastern Cape, Limpopo, and KwaZulu-Natal were not met with violence. Over 2000 people took part in the demonstrations. The TAC's objective was to deliver its five demands, which include the convening of a national meeting and plan for the HIV/AIDS crisis, the dismissal of the Health Minister, the immediate treatment of prisoners, respect for the rule of law and the Constitution, and the building of a people's health service.

== Support ==
The TAC has received support from many sectors of South African society, including Supreme Court Justice Edwin Cameron, former President Nelson Mandela, Anglican Archbishop of Cape Town Njongonkulu Ndungane, Médecins Sans Frontières, and the Congress of South African Trade Unions (COSATU). In August 2006, U.S. President Barack Obama, then a Senator, visited TAC's Khayelitsha office and met with then TAC chairperson Zackie Achmat. During his visit, Obama emphasised the importance of HIV testing and urged the South African government to "awake" from AIDS denialism.

TAC is supported by Ashoka, a nonprofit organisation that promotes social entrepreneurship.

== Solidarity ==
TAC has worked with and shown solidarity with a number of organisations and movements. This includes the Social Justice Coalition, the Anti-Eviction Campaign, the AIDS Law Project and COSATU. In October 2009, TAC issued a statement of Solidarity with Abahlali baseMjondolo condemning the attacks by ANC members on Kennedy Road informal settlement.

== See also ==
- HIV/AIDS denialism
- Quackdown

=== Sister organisations ===
- Equal Education
- Social Justice Coalition
