= Social Justice Coalition (South Africa) =

South African social organization

- Formation: 2008
- Type: Community organisation
- Headquarters: Khayelitsha, South Africa
- Members: 2000
- Official language: English, Xhosa
- Staff: 20
- Website: www.sjc.org.za

Founded in 2008, the Social Justice Coalition (SJC) is a membership-based social movement made up of 12 branches, located mainly in informal settlements across Khayelitsha, Cape Town. Since its formation, the SJC has worked to advance the constitutional rights to life, dignity, equality, freedom and safety for all people, but especially those living in informal settlements across South Africa. Their campaigns are based on ongoing research, education, and advocacy and divided across two programs. The Local Government Program leads the work on sanitation, budgets, and urban land. The Safety and Justice Program is focused on policing and the criminal justice system.

== Purpose ==
The SJC believes in accountable and effective government, and the democratic participation of communities in developing policy and the implementation of services. As an organization, the SJC is not aligned to any political party. The SJC's campaigns are based on ongoing research, education, and advocacy. Their advocacy works come in many forms including formal submissions on policy and budgets, engagement with government, memorandums, protest marches, and other forms of public and legal action. The SJC's work is divided into two main programmes: Local, Government and Safety, and Justice.

== Programmes ==
=== Safety and Justice ===
This program is designed to make Khayelitsha and all of South Africa a safer place where there is improved access to justice and a better working relationship between the police and communities.

==== Khayelitsha and safety ====
Khayelitsha is one of the most unsafe areas in South Africa and is similar to the conditions in townships across the country. It has an overworked and under-resourced criminal justice system. For years, the SJC and partner organizations monitored crime and safety in Khayelitsha and identified many problems such as poor police investigations, lack of support for victims of crime, long response times when police are called, dockets disappearing from court and a lack of support for police. The South African Police Service (SAPS), often the only recourse that poor and vulnerable people have, is unable to ensure residents safety. Apartheid era resource allocations persist resulting in the Khayelitsha cluster being allocated less police officers per capita than those serving formerly white and coloured areas in the city, and by and large the least experienced detectives.

==== Campaign for a commission of inquiry into policing in Khayelitsha ====
More than 10 years of struggle by an alliance of communities, organizations, and social movements led to the establishment of a Commission of Inquiry into policing in Khayelitsha – this became known as the O’Regan-Pikoli Commission of Inquiry. For years, we tried to get government and the police to listen to these concerns and improve conditions. The Commission is very important for changing the Apartheid state, especially the police. It is providing a way to make sure there is long term change in the criminal justice system, particularly in poor and working class areas. The National Minister of Police tried to stop the commission in 2012 and 2013, but he lost in both the Western Cape High Court and then in the South African Constitutional Court.

The commission held its public hearings in early 2014 and released its final report on 25 August 2014. The SJC and partner organizations are now working on ensuring the implementation of its 20 recommendations, which the Commission identified as being key to making Khayelitsha a safer place. The Commission radically altered the nature of participatory government in the sphere of safety, policing, and justice.

=== Local government ===
The local government programme of the SJC aims at improving the performance and accountability of the city government of Cape Town and the provincial government of Western Cape. To this end, the SJC scrutinizes and highlights the legal obligations of the respective governments and addresses the problems that arise when the governments fail to meet those obligations. These problems are brought to the attention of the city and provincial government and the SJC works to pressure the governments into correcting the problems. The SJC also undertakes a series of education campaigns designed to empower those living in informal settlements to take steps to address the problems themselves.

==== Budget justice ====
With the SJC's partners Ndifuna Ukwazi and the International Budget Partnership we have developed a campaign for a fair budget for toilets in Cape Town and for proper participation in the budget. In 2015 the SJC helped to collect and submit more than 500 submissions from residents of Khayelitsha about how they felt the City needed to spend its budget to improve sanitation. Never before have so many submissions been made.

In the city’s 2015/2016 draft budget R22 million is proposed for sanitation infrastructure for all 204 informal settlements in the city. This means that all the households in informal settlement are getting less than 2% of the capital budget for sanitation. For perspective, R106 million is being set aside for one parking garage for the City’s Finance Directorate.

===== Sanitation expenditure =====
In the city’s 2015/2016 draft budget R22 million is proposed for sanitation infrastructure for all 204 informal settlements in the city. This means that all the households in informal settlements are getting less than 2% of the capital budget for sanitation. For perspective, R106 million is being set aside for one parking garage for the City’s Finance Directorate.

==== Urban land justice ====
Cape Town’s segregation on race and class lines is one of the key legacies of Apartheid, but continues to be maintained and worsened by government today. Poor and working class communities are forced to live far away from central areas where there are few socio-economic opportunities. We have made objections to the sale of land by the City and Provincial government as there are vast areas of government-owned land that remain unused or are sold to private developers instead of for low cost housing. The SJC is now building a campaign for urban land justice so that poor and working class communities can access land, resources, and opportunities closer to the City and to reverse Apartheid spatial planning.

=== Grootboom Lectures ===
Every year the SJC hosts a lecture series in honor of housing activist Irene Grootboom in order to promote community participation on issues faced by poor and working class communities.

==== 2010 ====
The theme of the 2010 lecture series was "Masithete" (Xhosa for "lets talk)," in part a response to the poor sanitation conditions in a section of Khayelitsha known as Makhaza where miscommunication between community members and government officials resulted in certain residents having to use toilets without walls or roofs.

==== 2011 ====
The 2011 lecture series was titled "The History of Inequality in Cape Town: 1652-2011". The lectures put an emphasis on the historical developments starting in the pre-colonial era that led to the high levels of income disparity and racial segregation in Cape Town. The aim of those lectures was to highlight the causes of inequality and disparity in Cape Town and then discuss a vision for the future of Cape Town including setting goals for Cape Town to achieve by the year 2031.

==== 2012 ====
The 2012 lecture series examined the potential of the concept of design, to bring relief to those living in informal settlements. The lectures explored different concepts of urban planning with the aim of providing solutions to the safety and sanitation problems in the informal settlements.

==== 2013 ====
The 2013 lecture series was entitled "Beyond High Walls and Broken Windows" and was focused on the lack of security faced by those living in informal settlements. There were a variety of topics addressed by the lectures including police brutality, the long term effects of crime on individuals, and the underlying causes of crime in post-apartheid South Africa.

==== 2014 ====
The 2014 lecture series looked into the lingering effects of apartheid era urban planning. The lectures were designed to examine the reasons why racial separation continues in the post-apartheid era and the consequences of that separation in terms of the health and physical security of the residents of the black informal settlements.

== See also ==
- Social justice

=== Sister organisations ===
- Treatment Action Campaign
- Equal Education
- Ndifuna Ukwazi

== Sources ==
- Khayelitsha Commission of Inquiry Final Report
- SJC Social Audit
- Social Audit Final Report
