= Kgalema Motlanthe =

President of South Africa from 2008 to 2009

His Excellency Kgalema Motlanthe
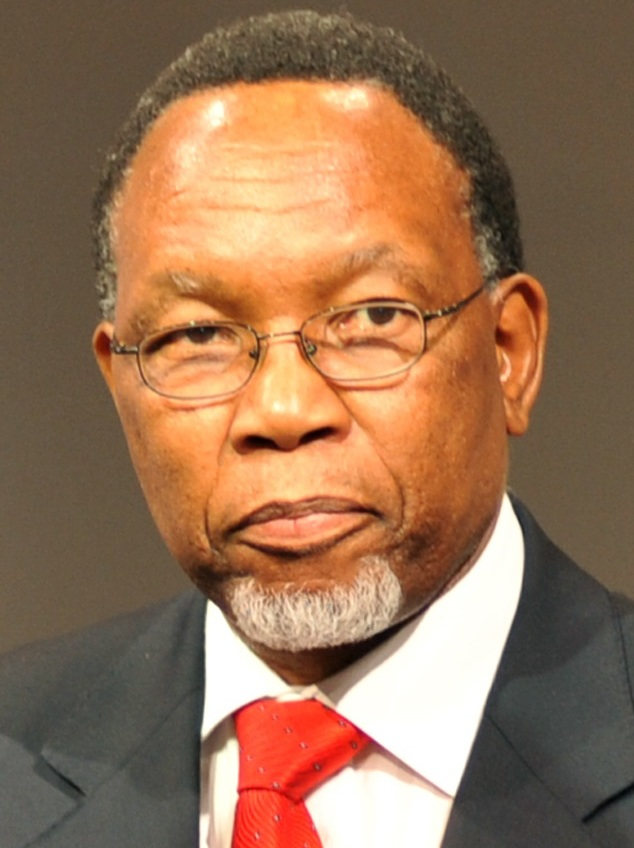
- Motlanthe in 2009

3rd President of South Africa
- In office 25 September 2008 – 9 May 2009
- Deputy: Baleka Mbete
- Preceded by: Thabo Mbeki (Note: Ivy Matsepe-Casaburri briefly served as Acting President for 14 hours between 24 September 2008 – 25 September 2008.)
- Succeeded by: Jacob Zuma

Deputy President of South Africa
- In office 9 May 2009 – 26 May 2014
- President: Jacob Zuma
- Preceded by: Baleka Mbete
- Succeeded by: Cyril Ramaphosa

Deputy President of the African National Congress
- In office 18 December 2007 – 18 December 2012
- President: Jacob Zuma
- Preceded by: Jacob Zuma
- Succeeded by: Cyril Ramaphosa

Secretary-General of the African National Congress
- In office 20 December 1997 – 18 December 2007
- President: Thabo Mbeki
- Preceded by: Cyril Ramaphosa; Cheryl Carolus (acting)
- Succeeded by: Gwede Mantashe

Member of the National Assembly
- In office 6 May 2009 – 7 May 2014
- In office 6 May 2008 – 25 September 2008
- Constituency: National list
Additional offices 1991‍–‍present
Chairperson of the African National Congress Electoral Committee
Incumbent
Assumed office 15 February 2021
Preceded by	Position established
Minister in the Presidency
In office July 2008 – September 2008 Serving with Essop Pahad
President	Thabo Mbeki
Preceded by	Position established
Succeeded by	Position abolished
Secretary-General of the National Union of Mineworkers
In office June 1991 – 1998
President	James Motlatsi
Preceded by	Cyril Ramaphosa
Succeeded by	Gwede Mantashe

Personal details
- Born: Kgalema Petrus Motlanthe; 19 July 1949 (age 77) Boksburg, South Africa
- Party: African National Congress
- Spouses: Mapula Mokate (m. 1975; div. 2014) Gugu Mtshali (m. 2014)
- Children: Kgomotso; Kagiso; Ntabiseng (step-daughter)
- Occupation: Politician; trade unionist; military veteran; activist
- Nicknames: Mkhuluwa; The Wizard

Military service
- Allegiance: African National Congress
- Branch/service: uMkhonto weSizwe
- Years of service: 1977–1987
- Battles/wars: Resistance to apartheid

Kgalema Petrus Motlanthe (Note: Sotho: [ˈkxɑ.le.mɑ mʊ.ˈtɬʼɑ.n.tʰɛ];) (born 19 July 1949) is a South African politician who served as the third president of South Africa from 2008 to 2009, following the resignation of Thabo Mbeki. Thereafter, he was deputy president under Jacob Zuma from 2009 to 2014.

Raised in Soweto in the former Transvaal after his family was forcibly removed from Alexandra, Motlanthe was recruited into uMkhonto weSizwe, the armed wing of the African National Congress (ANC), after he finished high school. Between 1977 and 1987, he was imprisoned on Robben Island under the Terrorism Act for his anti-apartheid activism. Upon his release, he joined the influential National Union of Mineworkers, where he was general secretary between 1992 and early 1998. After the end of apartheid, he ascended from the trade union movement to the national leadership of the ruling ANC, serving as ANC secretary general from late 1997 to late 2007. He was elected ANC deputy president, on a slate aligned to Zuma, by the ANC's 2007 Polokwane conference. In mid-2008, he was sworn in as a Member of Parliament and as Mbeki's second Minister in the Presidency – his first job in government.

Only weeks later, on 25 September 2008, Parliament elected him national president after Mbeki resigned at the ANC's request. Motlanthe was widely understood to be a compromise candidate and to be leading a caretaker administration until the 2009 national election. During his seven and a half months as president, he appeared to prioritise stability and continuity with the policies of the previous administration. However, on his first day in office, he replaced Health Minister Manto Tshabalala-Msimang with Barbara Hogan, effecting a break with Mbeki's HIV/AIDS policy, which had been criticised as ineffective and driven by denialism. He also made controversial changes at the National Prosecuting Authority, dismissing the National Director of Public Prosecutions, Vusi Pikoli, and assenting to legislation which disbanded the Scorpions, an elite anti-corruption unit.

Zuma was elected president in May 2009, and Motlanthe was appointed his deputy. In December 2012, under pressure from Zuma's opponents, he contested the ANC presidential elections at the party's Mangaung conference. Zuma, the incumbent, won in a landslide. Motlanthe declined to seek re-election to the ANC National Executive Committee, and had already declined a nomination for re-election as ANC deputy president. Having thus vacated the party leadership, he resigned from government and from Parliament in May 2014, at the end of his term as national deputy president.

Variously and at various times perceived as an ally of each of the other living presidents – Mbeki, Zuma, and his trade union colleague Cyril Ramaphosa. Motlanthe always kept a low public and political profile. He is seen as holding broad respect in the ANC, and is frequently characterised as one of its preeminent left-leaning intellectuals.

== Early life and career ==
Motlanthe was born on 19 July 1949 to a family in Alexandra, a township outside Johannesburg in the former Transvaal (now Gauteng). He is named for his maternal grandfather, Kgalema Madingoane, who was a councillor in Benoni and later a community leader in the newly established township of Daveyton. His father, Louis Mathakoe Motlanthe (d. 1989), worked as a cleaner at St John's College and later for Anglo American, and his mother, Masefako Sophia Madingoane (d. 2014), was a domestic worker and then a machinist in a clothing factory. He has two younger brothers, Tlatlane Ernest and Lekota Sydney.

He attended Pholosho Primary School, an Anglican missionary school in Alexandra, until his family was forcibly removed to Meadowlands, Soweto. In 1964, the Anglican church awarded him a bursary to study in Swaziland, but the Bantu Affairs Department of the apartheid government denied him permission to leave the country. He therefore attended Orlando High School in Soweto, and he played soccer as a teenager.

He has said that the Anglican church was an important influence on his early development, especially the Community of the Resurrection sect to which Archbishop Trevor Huddleston belonged and which, during his childhood, was visible for its community work in the townships. As a child, he was an altar boy and considered becoming a priest. In later years, he was influenced by Black Consciousness.

=== Early political career ===
After Matric (which in South Africa means completing final year of high school), Motlanthe got a job, which he held until his arrest, supervising township liquor stores in the commercial unit of the Johannesburg City Council.

During this period, in the 1970s, he was recruited into the underground of uMkhonto weSizwe, the armed wing of the African National Congress (ANC), which had been banned in South Africa since 1960. His MK unit was initially concerned with recruitment but was later instructed to form a sabotage unit and to help smuggle MK cadres in and out of the country's borders. It was during this period that he first met Jacob Zuma, also an underground MK operative.

=== Imprisonment ===
In April 1976, Motlanthe was arrested and detained for several months at John Vorster Square police station. He was found guilty under the Terrorism Act on charges relating to his MK activities – specifically, for having been trained to commit sabotage, for having received explosives for that purpose, and for promoting the ANC – and was sentenced to prison.

Motlanthe was imprisoned on Robben Island for almost ten years, between August 1977 and April 1987. ANC stalwart Andrew Mlangeni, who was on Robben Island with Motlanthe, later said that he was instrumental in welcoming and providing political education to young prisoners, who arrived on the island in large numbers in the decade after the 1976 Soweto uprising.

Five years after his release, Motlanthe spoke about the solidarity forged in prison, and described the period as "enriching":

...we were a community of people who ranged from the totally illiterate to people who could very easily have been professors at universities. We shared basically everything, every problem even of a personal nature we discussed with others and a solution would be found. The years out there were the most productive years in one's life, we were able to read, we read all the material that came our way, took an interest in the lives of people even in the remotest corners of this world. To me those years gave meaning to life.

=== Trade union career ===
The very first meeting we had, I was struck by his analytical capabilities and powers and by his disciplined approach to everything. Here was someone who had great dignity and humility.

— Ramaphosa recalls meeting Motlanthe in 1987

In June 1987, shortly after his release from prison, Motlanthe became an education officer at the influential National Union of Mineworkers (NUM), which was then led by Cyril Ramaphosa. He had been familiar with the mining industry since his childhood – his father and both his brothers had worked for mining giant Anglo American – and his mother had been involved in the trade union movement before her retirement in the 1980s. At the NUM, Motlanthe furthered his interest, born on Robben Island, in political education. He joined the NUM weeks before the largest strike in its history, and Ramaphosa later said that he had "joined us at just the right time".

While at the NUM, he remained a member of the ANC, and also of the South African Communist Party (SACP). He was chairperson of the ANC's PWV (now Gauteng) region for a brief period, between early 1990, when the ANC was unbanned, and September 1991, when he stepped down to concentrate on his NUM work. Shortly afterwards, Ramaphosa left the NUM to become secretary general of the ANC. In January 1992, with Ramaphosa's endorsement, Motlanthe was elected by the NUM central committee to replace him as acting general secretary.

== Rise to the presidency ==
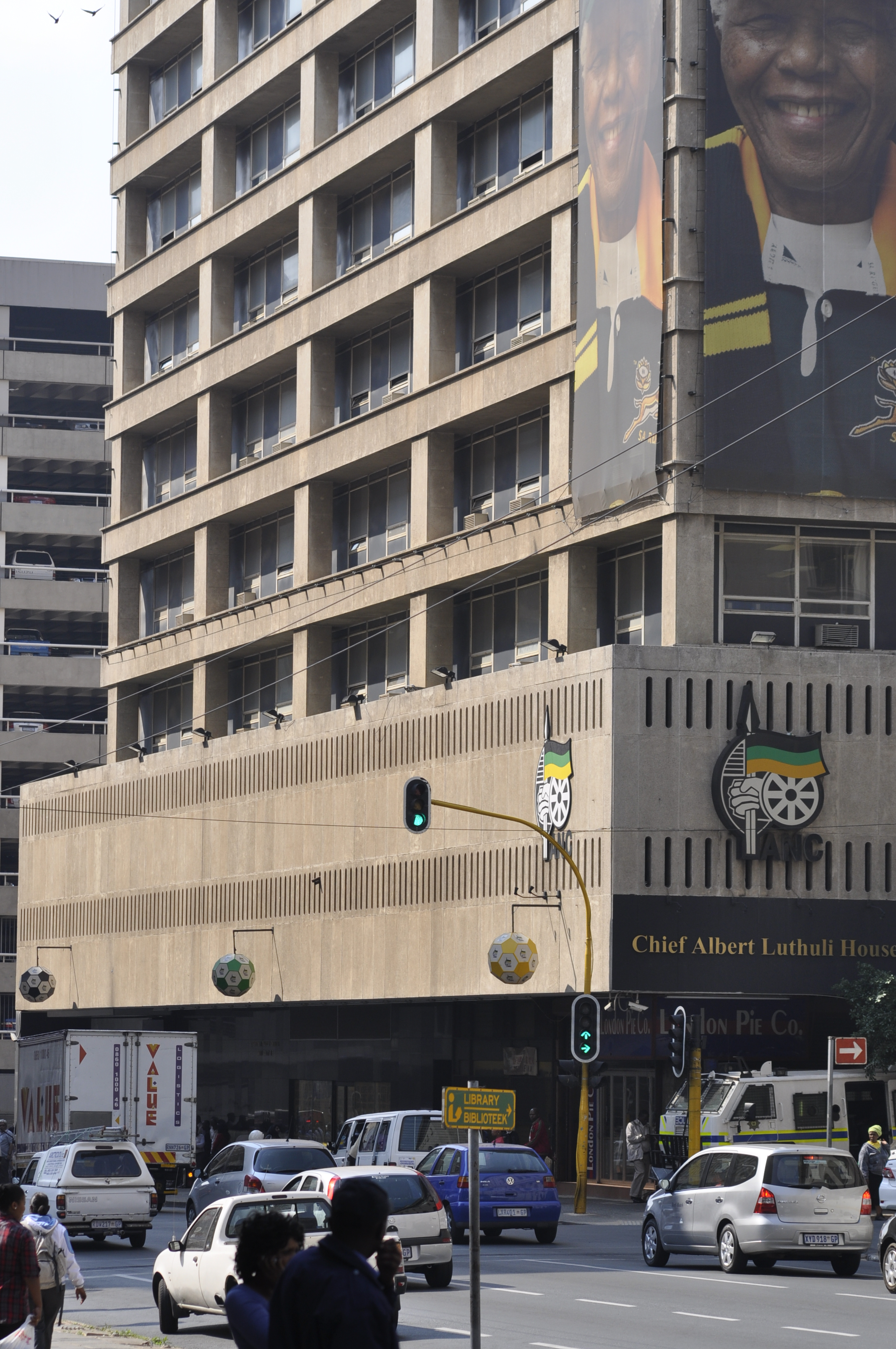
ANC headquarters Luthuli House, where Motlanthe worked from 1997 to 2007.

=== ANC secretary general ===
At the ANC's 50th National Conference in December 1997, Motlanthe was elected unopposed as ANC secretary general, reportedly with the support of senior ANC leaders including Walter Sisulu and Nelson Mandela. According to senior NUM and SACP official Frans Baleni, Mandela (affectionately known as Madiba) advocated for Motlanthe's appointment as follows:

Madiba ended up telling us a story of a young man from a rural village who was looking for a wife. He travelled from one village to another but he could not find one. However, when he arrived back home he saw that he had a neighbour who matched all the criteria he had in mind. In that way, Mandela told us that that the secretary general the ANC needed was right here and in the same way that the man was looking for a wife the ANC was looking for a bride.

His appointment was evidently popular with the rank-and-file: according to Richard Calland, when it was announced, he was carried to the stage on the shoulders of supporters, and "it took another 15 minutes for him to reach the stage, struggle songs filling the air."

After the conference, Motlanthe resigned from the NUM and from the Central Committee of the SACP. Re-elected unopposed at the ANC's 51st National Conference, he was ANC secretary general for ten years, between 1997 and 2007, the entirety of Thabo Mbeki's tenure as ANC president. While some said his "excellent" organisational skills were renowned, critics within the ANC said he was an inefficient administrator. However, there was a momentous increase in ANC membership during his tenure, from under 386,000 members in 1997 to more than 620,000 in 2007. He was also associated with implementing the early phases of the ANC's cadre deployment and Black Economic Empowerment (BEE) policies.

According to Mbeki's biographer Mark Gevisser, for much of this period Motlanthe was viewed as an "Mbeki acolyte" – or, in another phrase, as "dominated by Mbeki".

Their alliance apparently began in the mid-1990s when Mbeki was deputy president and Motlanthe was invited to attend the so-called "Under the Tree" meetings at Mbeki's home. He had been identified as one of the key leftist leaders who was dissatisfied with the new Growth, Employment and Redistribution (GEAR) policy, and he later told Gevisser that, at the meetings, Mbeki had indeed managed to sway his position on GEAR.

==== Criticism of BEE ====
In October 2004, in a speech to the Black Management Forum, Motlanthe delivered what was perceived as "an attack" on BEE, a cornerstone of the ANC's economic and transformation policy. In an early show of support for "broad-based" BEE, he called out fronting, proposed a "frank and open" assessment of why BEE's effects had been limited, and suggested that BEE should drive economic growth instead of hindering it.

Most controversially, Motlanthe argued that BEE should be restructured to limit the benefits (the number of deals or their total value) incurred by individuals from BEE transactions. Once an individual had been enriched by BEE, he said, he or she should no longer be considered historically disadvantaged in the sense of being eligible for BEE benefits. In his words, the government might "limit one person to one empowerment". His rationale was that the narrow base of BEE beneficiaries limited the success of the current policy, which he said had been characterised by transfer of wealth instead of genuine economic transformation. This was particularly controversial because many of the individuals who comprised that narrow base of BEE beneficiaries were ANC stalwarts or donors.

==== Hoax email scandal ====
Towards the end of Motlanthe's time as secretary general, the so-called hoax email scandal broke. The scandal revolved around a cache of emails that were released to journalists in 2005, shortly after Mbeki had fired Zuma as national deputy president. The emails ostensibly showed a group of ANC politicians and government officials discussing how to discredit Zuma, who was Mbeki's major political rival, and Motlanthe himself. An investigation by the intelligence inspector-general confirmed that the emails were fake, but Motlanthe reportedly rejected this conclusion and, in a meeting of the ANC National Executive Committee, demanded that the ANC conduct an internal investigation. From early 2006, there were rumours, denied by the ANC, that the saga had "damaged personal relations and destroyed trust" between Motlanthe and Mbeki. The Mail & Guardian said that it had also hurt Motlanthe's "image of being 'above the fray.'"

[T]he question that we must answer is where is the ANC?… When elected leaders at the highest level openly engage in factionalist activity, where is the movement that aims to unite the people of South Africa for the complete liberation of the country from all forms of discrimination and national oppression? When money changes hands in the battle for personal power and aggrandizement, where is the movement that is built around a membership that joins without motives of material advantage and personal gain?… When lists favoured by a chosen grouping are rammed down the throats of branches, without the benefit of political discussion, where is the ANC?

— Motlanthe's report to the Polokwane conference, 17 December 2007

=== ANC deputy president ===
On 18 December 2007, the ANC's 52nd National Conference, held in Polokwane, elected Motlanthe deputy president of the ANC. He beat Nkosazana Dlamini-Zuma comfortably, receiving 61.9% of the vote. His last act as secretary general was to deliver a memorable organisational report to the conference, criticising various wings of the party and especially the outgoing National Executive Committee, which he said had failed to resolve problems relating to factionalism and branch-level fraud.

The conference also saw incumbent ANC deputy president Jacob Zuma elected to the ANC presidency, deposing Mbeki in the culmination of a bitter leadership contest. There is debate about the extent of Motlanthe's role in Zuma's success. Motlanthe later condemned the practice of voting for candidates on slates, saying that he had held "as far back as Polokwane" that it was harmful to internal democracy in the party. Nevertheless, it is understood that Motlanthe ran on the Zuma-aligned slate of candidates, with Dlamini-Zuma as Mbeki's preferred candidate, though he was also at the top of the pro-Mbeki camp's list of recommended candidates for the National Executive Committee. Political analyst Susan Booysen claims that Zuma and Motlanthe had fallen out over Mbeki's handling of the Oilgate scandal and hoax email scandal, and suggests that Motlanthe used his detailed knowledge of the ANC's branches to help engineer Zuma's campaign – to the extent that he "co-directed" the mobilisation against Mbeki. Similarly, Alec Russell of the English Financial Times reported that Motlanthe had fallen out with Mbeki and was aligned to Zuma in the Zuma-Mbeki rivalry. Chris McGreal of the English Guardian said that he "played a leading role in ousting Mbeki and installing Zuma".

On the other hand, local journalist Ranjeni Munusamy claims that Motlanthe did not take a clear position in favour of either candidate until the conference itself, and that, as secretary general, he was focused on "trying to hold things together" and "had to rise above the camp warfare". He was certainly involved in attempting to maintain discipline during the conference – on the first day, he confiscated partisan placards from some delegates and took the stage to restore order when the session devolved into shouting from Zuma supporters. Ebrahim Harvey later said that his "open, frank and courageous report and interventions increased [his] stature in the party", and Gevisser agrees that he was "the hero of Polokwane".

=== Cabinet minister ===
In the aftermath of the Polokwane conference, Mbeki remained national president, although he was likely to be replaced at the expiry of his term by Zuma, who was expected to be the ANC's presidential candidate in the 2009 national election. Motlanthe, on good terms with both factions, was viewed as a key figure in easing the transition between Mbeki and Zuma, and sources said that he had been lined up to take over Zuma's post if the latter was convicted on the corruption charges pending against him.

In March 2008, the newly elected ANC national executive asked Mbeki to appoint Motlanthe to his cabinet. At that point, Motlanthe was effectively unemployed, having vacated the full-time position of secretary general; and the appointment was intended to facilitate the transfer of power from Mbeki's administration to Zuma and also to Motlanthe himself, who had never served in government before but who was expected to become national deputy president in 2009. Both Mbeki and Motlanthe were initially opposed to this proposal, with Motlanthe later explaining that he had thought his appointment to cabinet would have been "setting a wrong precedent, which says that once you have been elected at conference into a leadership position you have the right to be accommodated in the government."

Nevertheless, he was sworn in as a Member of Parliament on 20 May 2008, filling a casual vacancy, and on 18 July was sworn in as a member of cabinet. He was appointed the second Minister in the Presidency (Essop Pahad was the first), as well as Leader of Government Business. He later joked that he had been told that the appointment was apt because he was interested in business – the Leader of Government Business does not actually deal with business in the sense of enterprise, but rather coordinates between Parliament and cabinet. By the time of his appointment, and thereafter, Motlanthe was viewed as Zuma's "right-hand man".

=== Election to the presidency ===
Ultimately, Motlanthe served as a minister for just over two months. On 20 September 2008, Mbeki announced his resignation from the presidency. He had been "recalled" by the ANC national executive following allegations that the criminal corruption charges against Zuma were the result of political interference by Mbeki. As a party-political body, the National Executive Committee did not technically have the authority to remove Mbeki from government office, but it could have instructed the ANC-controlled Parliament to remove him. In the same way, it could ensure the ascension of its presidential successor of choice, who would be indirectly elected by Parliament. On 22 September, while the resignation was still being formalised, Zuma said that the ANC would not confirm its choice until after the vote, but hinted to the press that it was Motlanthe, saying, "I am convinced, if given that responsibility, he would be equal to the task." However, Baleka Mbete, the incumbent Speaker of the National Assembly and an ally of Zuma, was also viewed as a possible candidate.

On 25 September 2008, Parliament elected Motlanthe President of South Africa by secret ballot. Having been nominated by ANC MP Ben Turok, he received 269 votes, against 50 votes for the opposition candidate, Joe Seremane of the Democratic Alliance (DA), with 41 ballots spoilt. He was sworn in the same day.

== Presidency (2008–2009) ==
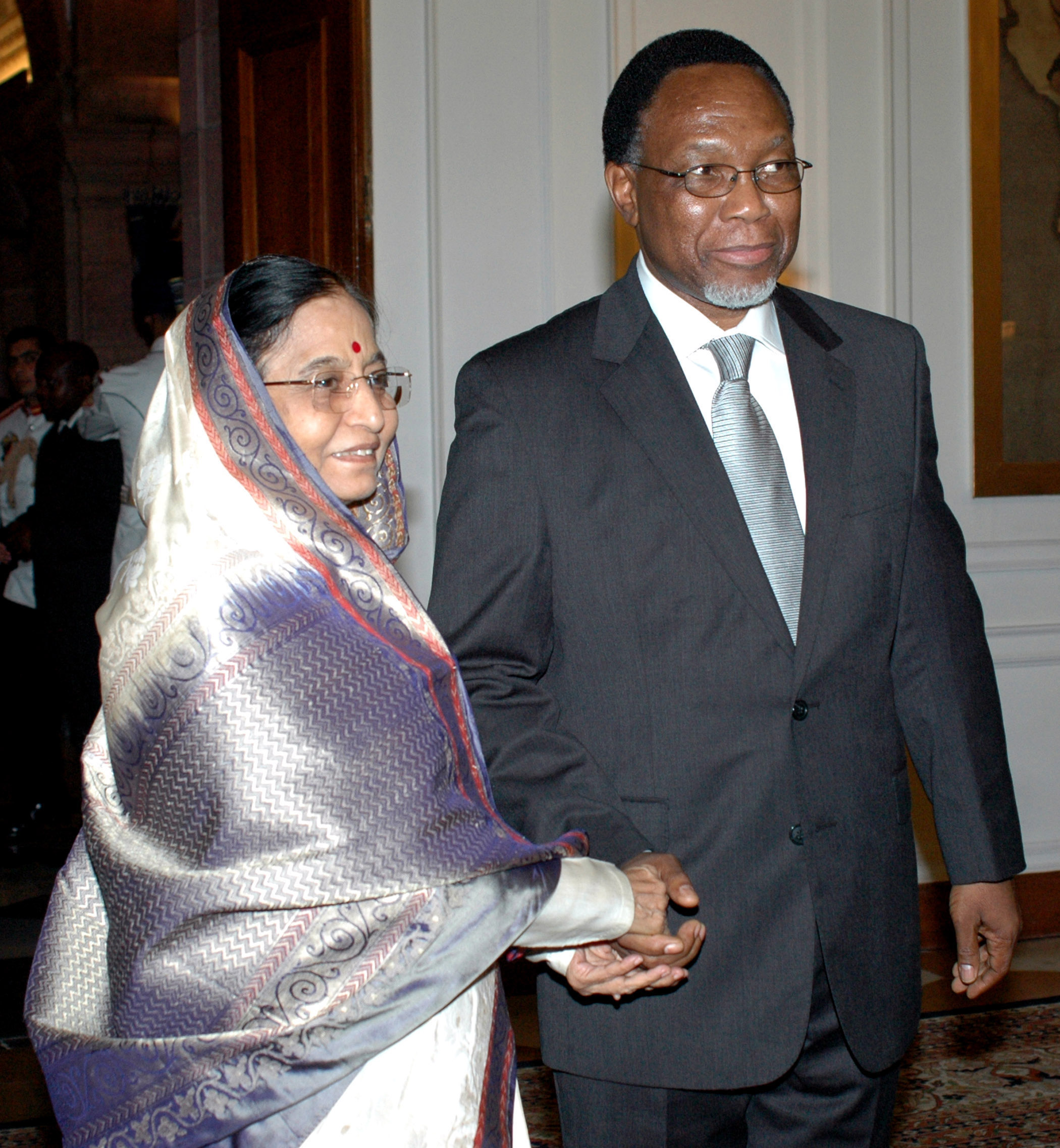
Motlanthe with Indian President Pratibha Patil in New Delhi, 15 October 2008.

=== Inauguration ===
Backbenchers at the parliamentary session which elected Motlanthe sang pro-Zuma songs, but it was reported that his appointment had broad support within the ANC and in the business community, and even among opposition parties. In Parliament, opposition politician Pieter Mulder of the Freedom Front Plus alluded to the possibility that Motlanthe might come to challenge Zuma's dominance:

To Mr Zuma I want to tell a story. Two Afrikaners in the olden days were on their way with a wagon and eight oxen. That evening they unharnessed the oxen and went to sleep in the bush next to the road. At midnight they heard lions roaring around the camp. Quickly and anxiously they harnessed the oxen and dashed away. When the sun came up that morning they saw that in their haste they had harnessed seven oxen and one of the lions. The two looked at each other and said: 'it was easy to hastily harness the lion in the dark, but how do we now unharness it again?'
The ANC harnessed Mr Motlanthe as a lion today in the dark and current crisis and we wish him well with that. Does the ANC also know how to unharness a lion, should it be necessary?

Mine is not the desire to deviate from what is working. It is not for me to reinvent policy. Nor do I intend to reshape either cabinet or the public service. In a turbulent global economy, we will remain true to the policies that have kept South Africa steady, and that have ensured sustained growth.

— Inaugural address, 25 September 2008

In a speech after his inauguration, Motlanthe assured Parliament that there would be continuity with the policies of Mbeki's administration. This was despite the fact that Mbeki's economic policies were unpopular with the left-wing pro-Zuma coalition, who thought them neoliberal. Motlanthe also announced his cabinet, having largely retained the composition of Mbeki's cabinet, and even having re-appointed several ministers, including respected finance minister Trevor Manuel, who had resigned after Mbeki's recall. Mbete was appointed deputy president. The rand strengthened, after Mbeki's announcement had caused a steep fall in its value. In Gevisser's view, Motlanthe "handled the transition deftly... projecting an image of calm confidence and continuity."

He was president for seven and a half months, between 25 September 2008 and 9 May 2009. He gave his first and only State of the Nation address on 6 February 2009, and in his speech he, "as expected, refrained from announcing any new plans", given that an election was scheduled for later that year.

=== HIV/AIDS policy ===
In the opinion of commentators, the most significant change made by Motlanthe to Mbeki's cabinet in September 2008 was the removal of Manto Tshabalala-Msimang from the health ministry. Tshabalala-Msimang's HIV/AIDS policy, especially her advocacy of herbal remedies, had been highly controversial and widely condemned, and Motlanthe replaced her with Barbara Hogan, who said in November: "The era of denialism is over completely in South Africa." Hogan's appointment, and later her performance in the position, were lauded by scientists: she prioritised the HIV/AIDS crisis and the roll-out of free antiretroviral drugs.

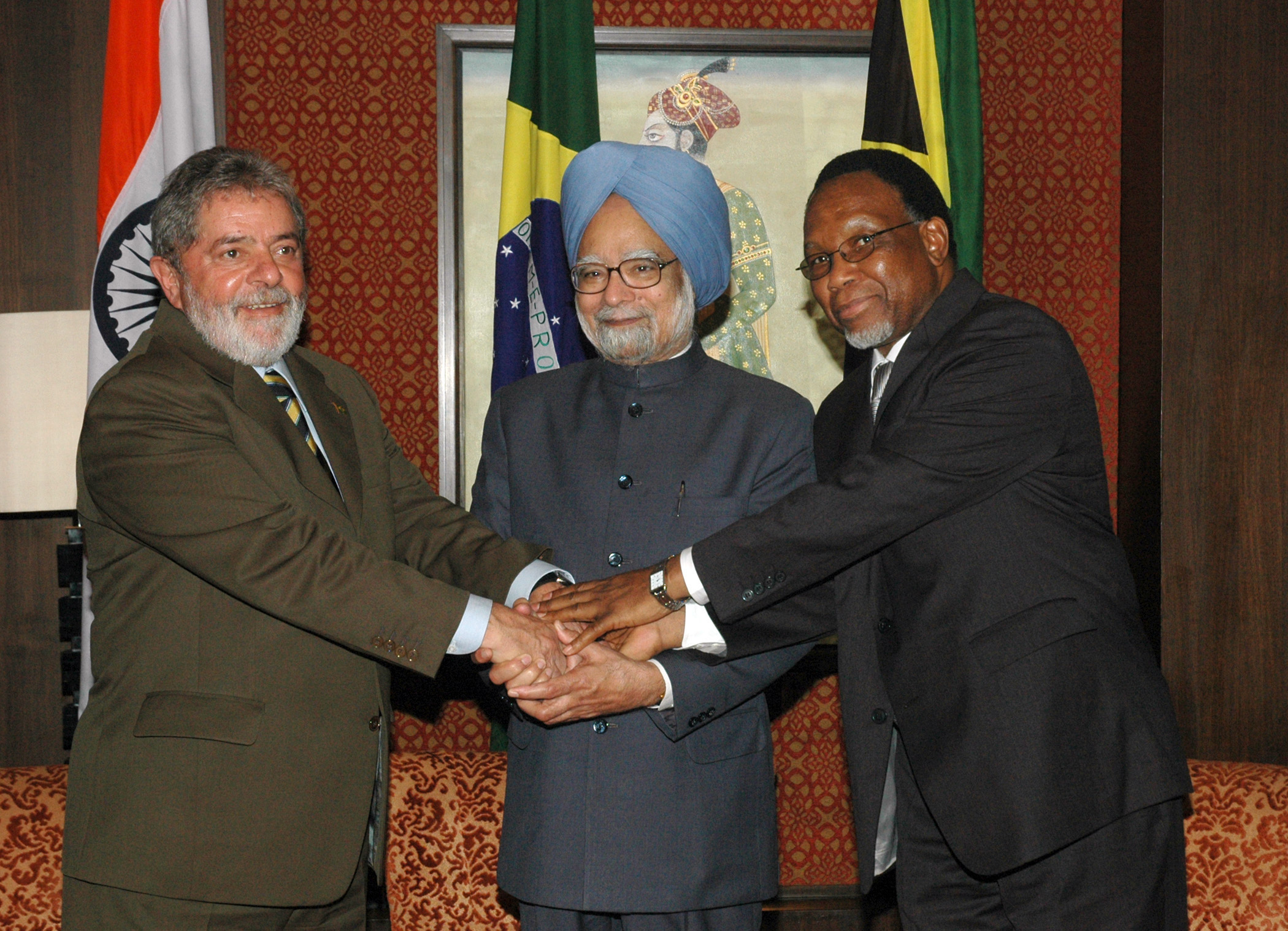
Motlanthe with Indian Prime Minister Manmohan Singh and Brazilian President Lula da Silva at the third IBSA Dialogue Forum in October 2008. IBSA was an initiative of the Mbeki government.

Before this, Motlanthe's stance on HIV/AIDS had been more ambiguous. On some accounts, while secretary general he supported, or at least defended, Mbeki's widely discredited HIV/AIDS policy, and also while secretary general he had spearheaded the ANC's attacks on the Medicines Control Council when it refused to allow the testing of Virodene on human subjects in 1998, accusing the council of being swayed by corporate pharmaceutical interests. In later years, however, including as deputy president, Motlanthe continued to advocate science-driven HIV/AIDS policy.

=== Zimbabwe ===
Ahead of the 2005 Zimbabwean parliamentary election, Motlanthe had delivered what was considered the ANC's "first public criticism" of Robert Mugabe's ZANU-PF regime in Zimbabwe. However, he was ANC secretary general at the time, and was almost certainly speaking on behalf of the ANC national executive. In general, he was viewed as sympathetic to Mbeki's controversial and non-confrontational "quiet diplomacy" approach to the regime, at least insofar as he appeared to share Mbeki's view that democratic change in Zimbabwe should not be externally imposed.

Once inaugurated as president, Motlanthe asked Mbeki to remain in his role as mediator between ZANU-PF and Morgan Tsvangirai's Movement for Democratic Change, and his government "[threw] its weight behind" the resulting Zimbabwean power-sharing agreement. Motlanthe, accompanied by Mbeki, met several times with Mugabe and Tsvangirai to try to convince them to implement the agreement and form a government. He retained Mbeki's stance that Mugabe had to be installed at the head of any power-sharing arrangement, but there were occasions on which he was critical of the ZANU-PF government. His administration provided financial and diplomatic support to the Zimbabwean unity government when it was ultimately formed in February 2009.

=== Corruption and law enforcement ===
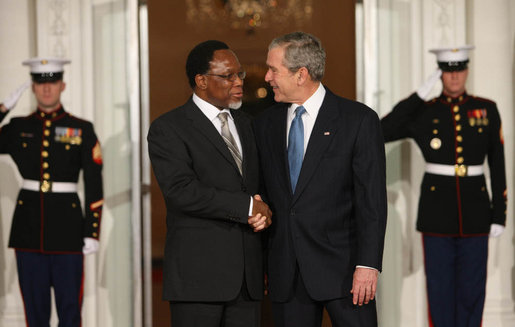
Motlanthe with American President George Bush at the White House ahead of an economic summit, 14 November 2008.

==== Disbanding of the Scorpions ====
In January 2009, Motlanthe signed into law two bills which disbanded the Scorpions, the elite anti-corruption unit of the National Prosecuting Authority (NPA). The 2007 Polokwane conference had resolved to disband the unit, and the issue had been part of Zuma's campaign platform ahead of the conference. In fact, there were reports that Motlanthe exasperated the ANC national executive by delaying before signing the legislation – it passed in the National Assembly in October 2008, but Motlanthe's office sought to review its constitutionality. His assent to the legislation was viewed by some as the result of political pressure from inside the ANC. During the same period, there were also rumours that the ANC was pressuring him to sign a controversial amendment to the Broadcasting Act, which governed the state broadcaster, the SABC.

The decision to dissolve the Scorpions was hotly contested, and opposition parties accused the ANC of making the move in order to subvert investigations into corrupt ANC politicians. Controversially, the Hawks, the unit which replaced the Scorpions, subsequently shut down the Scorpions' investigation into the 1999 Arms Deal, a R30-billion defence procurement package from which several senior ANC politicians, including Zuma, were accused of unlawfully profiting.

In 2011, the Constitutional Court ruled that the legislation disbanding the Scorpions had been unconstitutional, but Motlanthe has defended the decision as recently as August 2020.

==== Dismissal of Vusi Pikoli ====
On 8 December 2008, Motlanthe fired the head of the NPA, the National Director of Public Prosecutions Vusi Pikoli. Pikoli had been suspended by Mbeki in September 2007, ostensibly because of a breakdown in Pikoli's relationship with Justice Minister Brigitte Mabandla, but allegedly – according to Pikoli – for political reasons, in an attempt to shield police commissioner Jackie Selebi from prosecution on corruption charges. Motlanthe's decision to fire Pikoli was contrary to the recommendations of a commission of inquiry into Pikoli's fitness for office, established by Mbeki and chaired by Frene Ginwala, which had concluded that Pikoli should be reinstated. Pikoli challenged his dismissal in court, but Motlanthe continued to defend his decision, and Pikoli settled out of court with Zuma's government in November 2009.

Pikoli's removal was highly controversial. Although Motlanthe denied that he had been acting on the ANC's instructions, critics have suggested otherwise, claiming that Pikoli had been fired in order to "punish [his] insubordination to the ANC" or in order to facilitate the dropping of corruption charges against Zuma. A Financial Mail editorial said that Pikoli's dismissal was evidence that as president Motlanthe was "dancing to the tune" of Zuma and was "a crucial cog in the shin' wam project", and political analyst William Gumede agreed that it marked Motlanthe "as a party man, answerable to his constituency rather than public opinion."

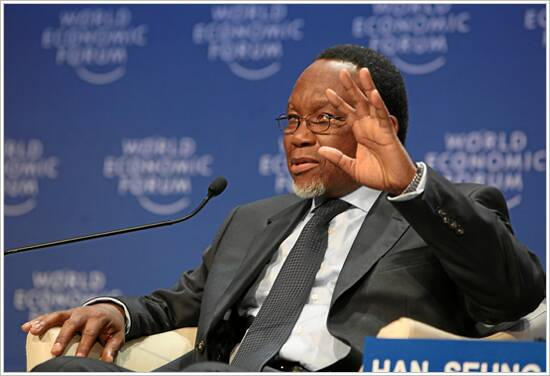
Motlanthe at the World Economic Forum in Davos, 30 January 2009.

==== Arms Deal inquiry ====
In December 2008, when new allegations emerged of corruption in the 1999 Arms Deal, Archbishop Desmond Tutu and former state president F. W. de Klerk wrote to Motlanthe requesting he establish an independent commission of inquiry. Their call was supported by several politicians and civil society groups. Motlanthe declined and, adhering to "the party line", said that criminal investigations, which he promised were ongoing, were the correct tool for probing the deal.

=== Succession ===
From the time of his appointment, Motlanthe was perceived as a "caretaker president". This was not based on the legal status of his administration or election, but on the understanding that Zuma, not Motlanthe, would be the ANC's presidential candidate in the 2009 elections. Towards the end of Motlanthe's presidency, there were rumours that Zuma's allies had grown concerned about Motlanthe's heightened profile as president and were suspicious that he might attempt to challenge Zuma. However, in January 2009, Motlanthe reiterated his and the ANC's support for Zuma, and said that Zuma would stand as the ANC's presidential candidate even if his corruption charges were reinstated.

== Deputy president (2009–2014) ==
As deputy president, Motlanthe filled various official duties, including as chairperson of the national Energy Advisory Council, the National AIDS Council, the Human Resource Development Council, and, until mid-2013, the National Nuclear Energy Coordination Committee. He also chaired the inter-ministerial committee on the 2010 FIFA World Cup, which was held in South Africa. In January 2011, there were unconfirmed media reports that former president Mandela was seriously ill, causing public panic. In a press conference which received international attention, Motlanthe reassured the public and admitted that the government's communication had been poor. The Daily Maverick complimented his handling of the situation. However, some suspected that Motlanthe was increasingly "frozen out" of important official business by Zuma, especially after he challenged Zuma for the ANC presidency in 2012.

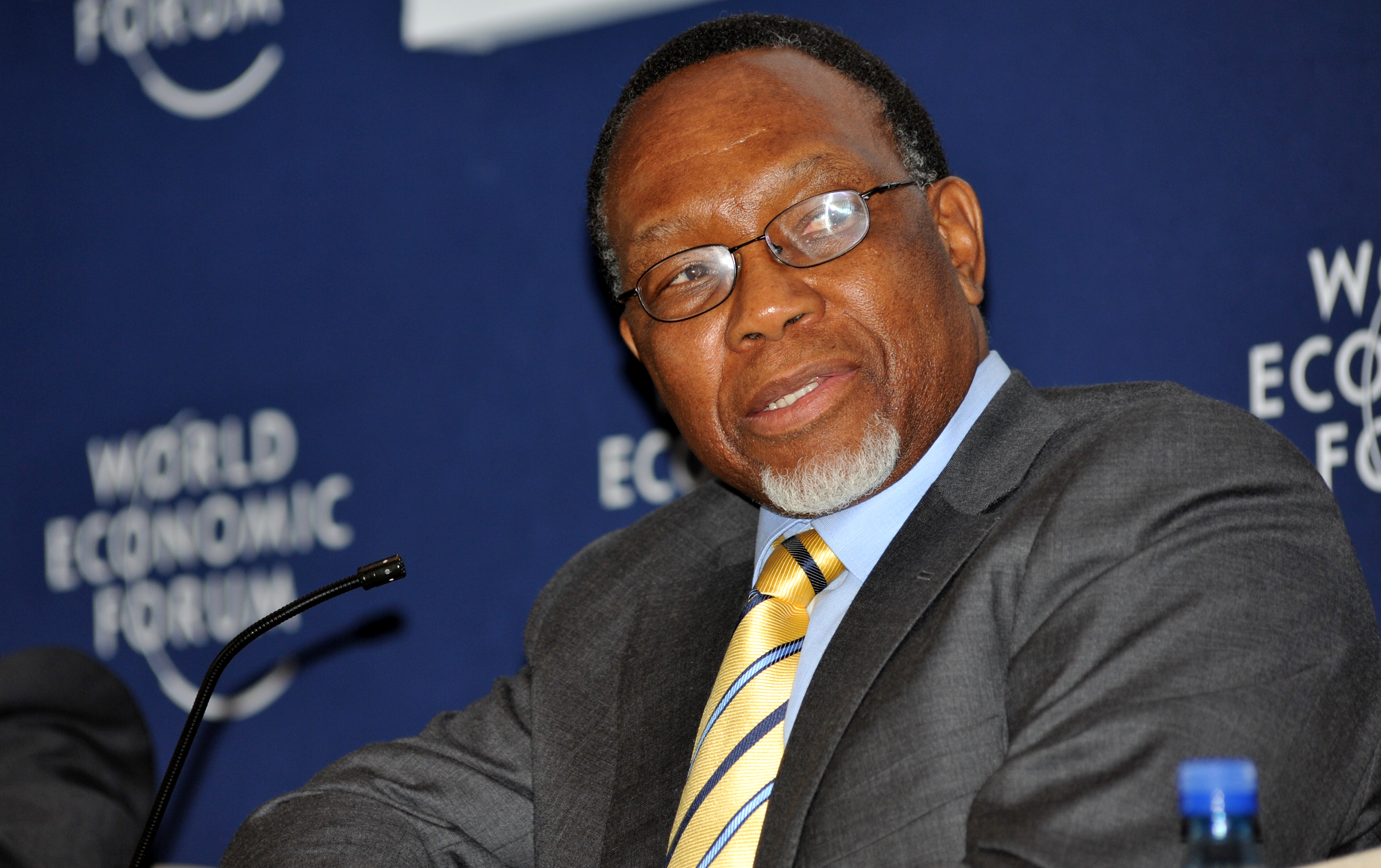
Recently appointed Deputy President Motlanthe at the World Economic Forum in Cape Town, 12 June 2009.

=== Media and secrecy bill ===
While president, Motlanthe had been praised for sending the Film and Publications Amendment Bill – which included pre-publication censorship provisions – back to Parliament, citing concerns about its constitutionality. As deputy president, he became involved in public discourse around further controversial government proposals which would affect press freedom and access to information. In September 2010, the ANC's National General Council resolved that Parliament should begin the process of setting up a state-regulated media appeals tribunal; the next month, following a summit with the South African National Editors' Forum, Motlanthe announced a reversal of this position, and said that the media would be given a chance to review its own self-regulatory mechanisms first. He was perceived as having "stronger democratic tendencies" than others in the cabinet on freedom of expression issues.

In 2011, public attention turned to the Protection of State Information Bill, which would extend the state's power to regulate access to classified state information and which was fervently opposed by the media, civil society groups, opposition parties, and the ANC's ally the Congress of South African Trade Unions (COSATU). A key issue of contention was the inclusion of a public interest defence exemptions clause. In September 2011, there were reports that the ANC was divided over the bill, with dissenters led by the party-political committee, chaired by Motlanthe. In November 2011, Motlanthe told the press that there could be "a meeting point" between the government and the bill's opponents over the public interest clause. He acknowledged as valid the press's argument that any public interest defence would have to be tested by the courts, and also promised that the bill would not be "rammed through" through Parliament by the ANC. Right2Know, a respected non-profit, declared: "We don't trust Motlanthe on this one." Indeed, the ANC parliamentary caucus proceeded to process the bill, and the draft was adopted by the National Assembly two weeks after Motlanthe's comments. When asked about it in Parliament, he continued to advocate further negotiations about the bill's contents.

=== Expulsion of Julius Malema ===
Julius Malema, the president of the ANC Youth League and previously among Zuma's most vocal supporters, was expelled from the ANC in February 2012 for insubordination. By then, elements of the Youth League had begun to call for Motlanthe to succeed Zuma, and Motlanthe appeared at political rallies with Malema even after he was expelled. Motlanthe had himself been critical of Malema's conduct in the past. Indeed, they had had a major public spat in 2008, when Motlanthe criticised Malema for saying that he was willing to "kill for Zuma" and criticised the broader Youth League for its verbal attacks on the judiciary. However, while deputy president, he had been involved with attempting to mediate with malcontent Youth League leaders. In October 2012, the Sowetan reported that, in a meeting with the SACP and unions at which Zuma was also present, Motlanthe had expressed disagreement with how Zuma had handled the conflict with Malema, arguing that the ANC should have met with the Youth League to discuss their grievances. Earlier that month, an authorised biography of Motlanthe had been published in which he made the same argument. The saga was seen as having damaged his relationship with Zuma.

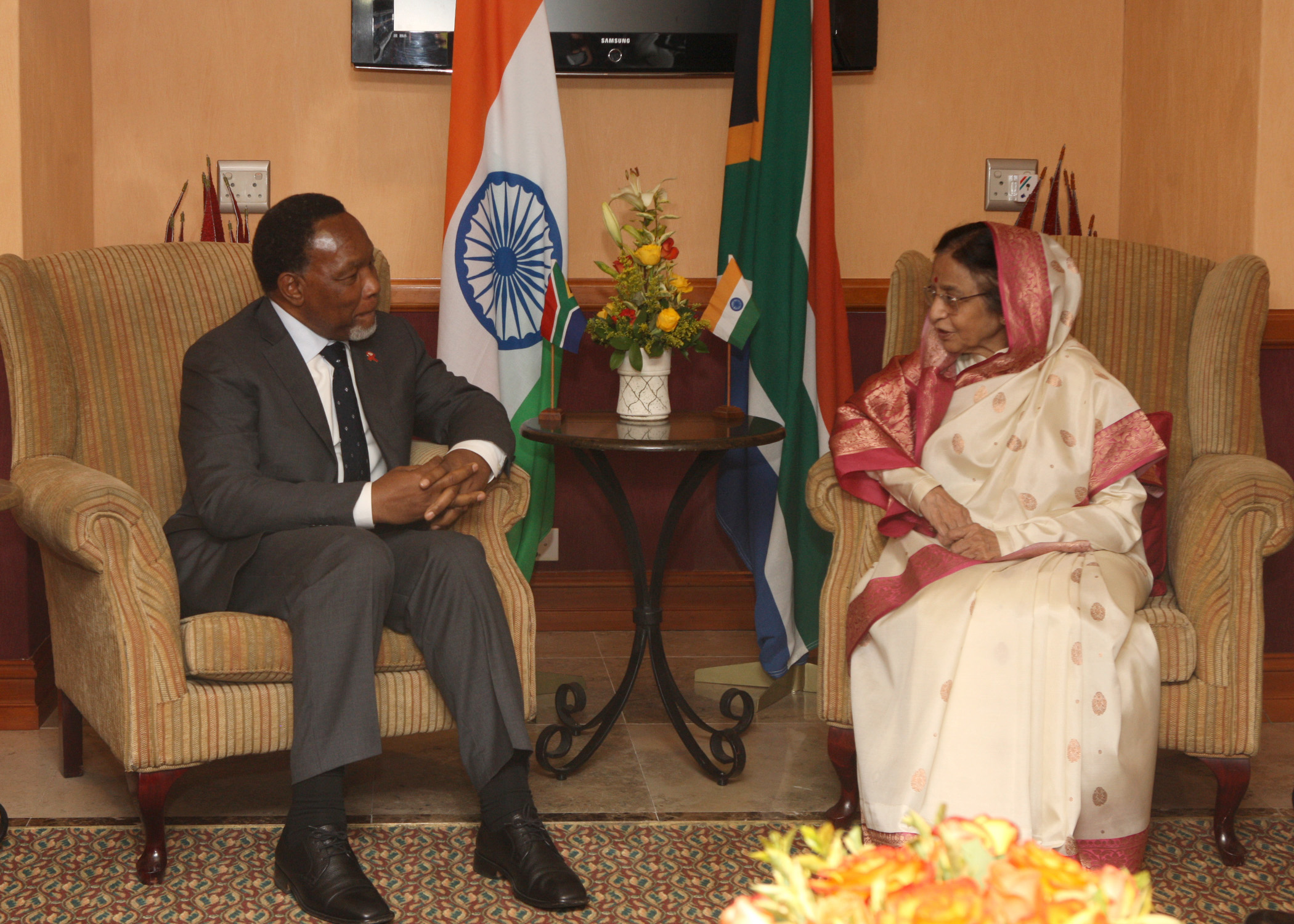
Motlanthe with President Patil in Pretoria, 2 May 2012.

=== 2012 presidential campaign ===
Ahead of the ANC's 53rd National Conference, there were rumours that the so-called "Anyone but Zuma" (ABZ) camp planned to nominate a candidate to challenge Zuma for the ANC presidency (and effectively therefore for the national presidency, since the ANC was overwhelmingly likely to win the 2014 general elections). In the run-up to the conference, it was apparent that Motlanthe and Zuma's relationship had deteriorated, and Motlanthe argued against a key Zuma-endorsed policy proposal at an ANC policy conference in June, implying that it was nonsensical and laced with "smatterings of Marxist jargon". By then, he was viewed as a possible challenger to Zuma's incumbency. In October 2012, he told the Financial Times that the ANC required "renewal", but evaded questions about his own willingness to stand for the party presidency, saying that the decision was up to the party branches, which are responsible for proposing nominees for the top leadership positions. Indeed, Motlanthe was a staunch adherent to ANC norms which disapproved of overt campaigning for party-political leadership positions.

It was about ensuring that the ANC continues to have faith in the process of elections as an instrument which is meant to strengthen the organisation. Once you do away with elections in an organisation and you arrange leadership, how else are you going to say the country elections are important?

— Motlanthe explains his reasons for challenging Zuma, July 2013

By early December, he was the "overwhelming choice" among Zuma's opponents to challenge the incumbent, and, although the branch nominations favoured Zuma overall, Motlanthe was formally nominated by the provincial branches of Gauteng, Limpopo, and the Western Cape, and by the Youth League. Motlanthe told journalists that he was "agonising" over his nomination. On 12 December, days before the conference, it was reported that he had agreed to accept the nominations and challenge Zuma. He appeared to be a reluctant candidate. The ANC's influential Tripartite Alliance partners, the SACP and COSATU, supported Zuma's presidency but wanted Motlanthe to remain deputy president. However, when the conference began in Mangaung in December, Motlanthe unexpectedly declined the nomination to stand for re-election as deputy president, meaning that he would be removed from the "Top Six" leadership if he did not win the presidency. Ramaphosa, who had retired from politics more than a decade earlier, was announced as the Zuma-endorsed candidate for the deputy presidency – a move viewed as a strategic attempt to "outsmart and punish" Motlanthe, whose constituency was presumed to resemble Ramaphosa's, given their shared union backgrounds and polished reputations.

On 18 December, Zuma won the leadership election by a landslide, with Motlanthe receiving just under 25% of the vote. In a famous photo by Greg Marinovich taken just after the announcement of the result, Motlanthe held up two fingers in the sign for "victory". Later in the conference, he declined a nomination to serve on the National Executive Committee, an early signal of his retreat from politics. According to ANC tradition, Ramaphosa, the newly elected ANC deputy president, would replace him as national deputy president after the 2014 elections. Despite speculation that Motlanthe might resign or be recalled before the elections, he served the rest of his term as deputy president.

== Retirement ==
On 12 March 2014, shortly before the 2014 general election, Motlanthe announced his resignation from government and from Parliament. During his last parliamentary session, he received a standing ovation from other MPs, and Mlangeni told Motlanthe and the rest of the National Assembly that Walter Sisulu had "always wanted" him to become president. Motlanthe made an emotional farewell speech to the house, describing the ANC as his "extended family" and reflecting on the importance of "a multi-vocal society". He said:

...for me right now this is a moment laden with mixed emotions... Being asked to serve one's country at any point in history is always an honour. However, the truth is our nation is replete with luminous talent. Not only that, at some point serving leadership must give way, so that new blood, fired up with life-changing ideas, can take society to a higher level of development. Necessarily, the time comes when all 'leaders', as H. G. Wells advises, 'should lead as far as they can and then vanish. Their ashes should not choke the fire they have lit.' I would not let my ashes choke the verdant future that is beginning to assume some discernible outlines on the horizon... I am happy to have played the small part history has assigned me.

Recently I read an article where one comrade said the alliance is dead. People are exposing themselves… they are politically bankrupt. They left on their own because they thought it was nice out there. It is cold out there. Some of them were general secretaries but today they are criticising the ANC. They kept quiet while they were still in the ANC, they only got wisdom after they had left. If they say the ANC is weak, they must have weakened it.

— Zuma responds, obliquely, to Motlanthe's 2015 claim that the Tripartite Alliance was dead

=== Criticism of the ANC ===
Since his retirement, Motlanthe has frequently been critical of the ANC's condition, and he became an outspoken opponent of President Zuma during the latter's second term of office, when allegations emerged of widespread political corruption in Zuma's administration. As early as 2015, Motlanthe was perceived as tacitly deprecating Zuma's leadership in the press. In an interview with the Business Day, he made various comments critical of the ANC leadership, including that he had decided not to seek re-election for the ANC national executive at the 2012 Mangaung conference because:

My sense [at the time] was that I cannot serve in an organisation that does not respect its own constitution... I was clear that if I continued serving in that leadership it would be a constant battle just to get them to operate on the basis of the constitution.

In an interview in March 2016, though not directly using Zuma's name, Motlanthe spoke of an "integrity gap" in the ANC and criticised leaders who failed to take accountability and resign from office when warranted. In January 2017, he called explicitly for Zuma and the party's other Top Six leaders to resign. Two months later, presenting a eulogy at the funeral of Ahmed Kathrada, his friend and an ANC stalwart, Motlanthe received a standing ovation when he quoted from a letter sent to Zuma by Kathrada in 2016, in which Kathrada had asked Zuma to step down from the presidency. Motlanthe pointed out that Zuma had never responded to the letter and said: "On a day like this we should not mince words. We should say it like it is." In April 2017, repeating his call for Zuma to resign, he said of the Zuma presidency that MPs "would have learnt their lesson" ahead of the next presidential election and would now be aware that, "It's always important to elect someone who is honest and of integrity, and not an incorrigible person."

He is presumed to be allied to Ramaphosa, who is now national and ANC president, although in 2019 he told the Sunday Times that the ANC's condition had deteriorated since Ramaphosa's election as ANC president.

=== ANC activities ===
Motlanthe remains active in the ANC, and he campaigned door-to-door for the ANC in Soweto ahead of the 2016 local elections. After he resigned, it was reported that he would become the dean the ANC's new political school, as first announced by Zuma at the end of the Mangaung conference in 2012. The ANC's O. R. Tambo School of Leadership ultimately was not established until 2019, but Motlanthe has indeed been appointed its chairperson. In April 2021, the ANC's National Working Committee asked him to oversee talks between competing factions in the party's highly divided Free State branch. He also chaired the ANC's internal electoral committee in the run-up to the 2021 local elections, overseeing the selection of the party's electoral candidates. Under his leadership, the committee decided to exclude from competition all potential candidates accused of corruption or misconduct.

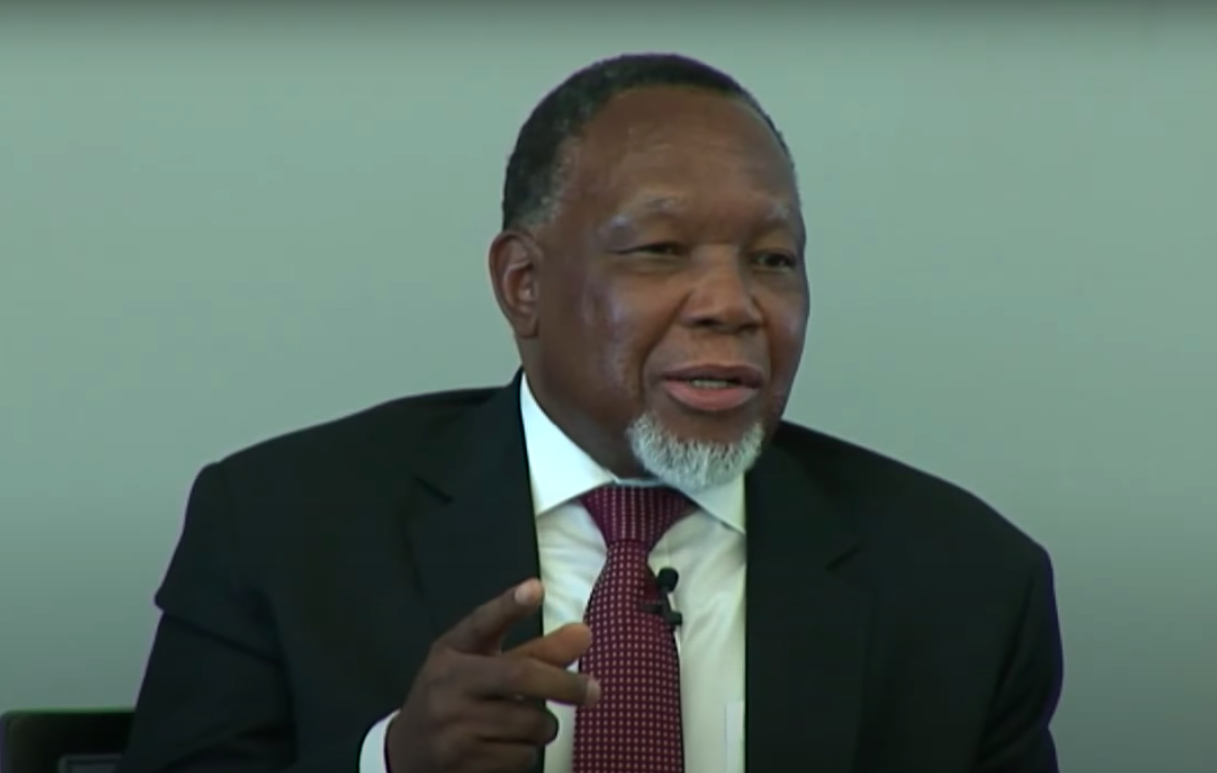
Motlanthe in Washington, D.C., May 2017.

=== Foundation ===
The Kgalema Motlanthe Foundation was established in 2018, with a mission statement encompassing socioeconomic development, access to knowledge and education, and human rights and social inclusion in South Africa and in Africa more broadly. Ramaphosa made a speech at the foundation's launch in KwaZulu-Natal.

=== Other positions ===
In 2017, Motlanthe chaired the High Level Panel on the Assessment of Key Legislation and the Acceleration of Fundamental Change, a government panel which made significant findings on land reform, leading to the Pietermaritzburg High Court's 2021 finding against the Ingonyama Trust. In March 2018, he chaired the African Union's election observation mission to the 2018 elections in Sierra Leone. Later that year, Zimbabwean President Emmerson Mnangagwa appointed him chairperson of a commission of inquiry into post-election unrest in Harare, during which state forces had killed several civilians.

He has been a member of the Global Commission on Drug Policy since March 2019. In 2020, he and former Nigerian president Olusegun Obasanjo co-authored an article in which they disowned their administrations' drug policies, arguing that criminalisation and prohibition were irrational and ineffective, and declaring: "We were wrong."

He joined the board of Ivanhoe Mines as a non-executive director in April 2018. He is also a trustee of the Nelson Mandela Foundation, and on 23 January 2021 the foundation announced that its top executives would be stepping down, pending a misconduct investigation, and that Motlanthe and two other trustees would lead the foundation in the interim.

== Controversies ==
=== Oil-for-Food scandal and Oilgate ===
Among the biggest scandals in the ANC during Motlanthe's tenure as secretary-general were two closely related scandals revolving around the ANC's relationship with businessman Sandi Majali and his company Imvume Holdings, the recipient of state contracts worth R1.74 billion. First, in 2004, the Mail & Guardian reported that Majali's companies had purchased Iraqi oil – some of which was later sold to the South African state – under the widely abused United Nations (UN) Oil-for-Food Programme, possibly on the basis of Majali's ostensible political access, and contingent on the payment of "surcharges" (in this context, illegal kickbacks) to the Iraqi regime. Later, in 2005, the same newspaper reported that Imvume had donated R11 million to the ANC shortly after receiving a R15-million advance on a state contract. Finally, topping off both scandals, it presented evidence that Imvume was "effectively a front" for the ANC. Motlanthe was seen as having a case to answer: in December 2000, and possibly on other occasions, Motlanthe had belonged to an ANC delegation that had travelled to Baghdad with Majali to meet with Iraqi officials, presumably to broker the Oil-for-Food deals, and he had written to the Iraqi government saying that Majali had the ANC's "full approval and blessing". From 2004, sources had said that Motlanthe and Majali were close associates, and by 2005 Motlanthe was being referred to as "Majali's ANC patron", with Imvume having described Majali as his "economic adviser". The Volcker Committee also mentioned Motlanthe as a key player in the Oil-for-Food deals.

In 2006, Mbeki appointed advocate Michael Donen to investigate possible misconduct, but the commission never completed its work. In journalist Stephen Grootes's phrase, the "conventional wisdom" became that Motlanthe had been "involved" in the deals. In December 2011, Zuma released the interim report of the Donen Commission, which focused primarily on the allegations against Motlanthe and on others against Tokyo Sexwale. The report was widely viewed as exonerating Motlanthe: Donen rejected the Volcker Committee's views and concluded that Motlanthe's intentions had been innocent. The Mail & Guardian dissented, arguing that the Donen Commission had not fully and properly investigated the allegations against Motlanthe.

=== Land Bank loan ===
In July 2005, while Motlanthe was secretary general, the Sunday Times reported that the state-owned Land Bank had funded a black economic empowerment deal from which Motlanthe was set to profit. The bank had provided R800 million – a very large loan, at more than 40% of the bank's reserves – for Pamodzi Investment Holdings to purchase 49% of Foodcorp. Both Motlanthe and Manne Dipico, an adviser to Mbeki, had a stake (in Motlanthe's case, 0.15%) in Pambi Trust, which owned 8% of Pamodzi. Mothlanthe was a beneficiary, not a trustee, of Pambi, and Pamodzi said that he had not been aware of the transaction while it was taking place; moreover, the loan had apparently been arranged by the Industrial Development Corporation, not directly by Pamodzi. However, the loan was controversial, and the DA called for the Public Protector to investigate. The Public Protector's investigation cleared Motlanthe of misconduct.

=== Alleged aviation bribe ===
In March 2012, the Sunday Times printed an allegation, supported by Barry Oberholzer, that in 2011 Motlanthe's partner, Gugu Mtshali, had been involved in soliciting a R104-million bribe from aviation company 360 Aviation. The bribe was allegedly intended to obtain government support, facilitated by Motlanthe (then deputy president), for a proposed sanctions-busting deal with the Iranian government. Motlanthe denied the allegation and asked the Public Protector to investigate; both he and Mtshali were cleared of wrongdoing. COSATU applauded Motlanthe's willingness to subject himself to public scrutiny and accountability.

== Personality and public image ==
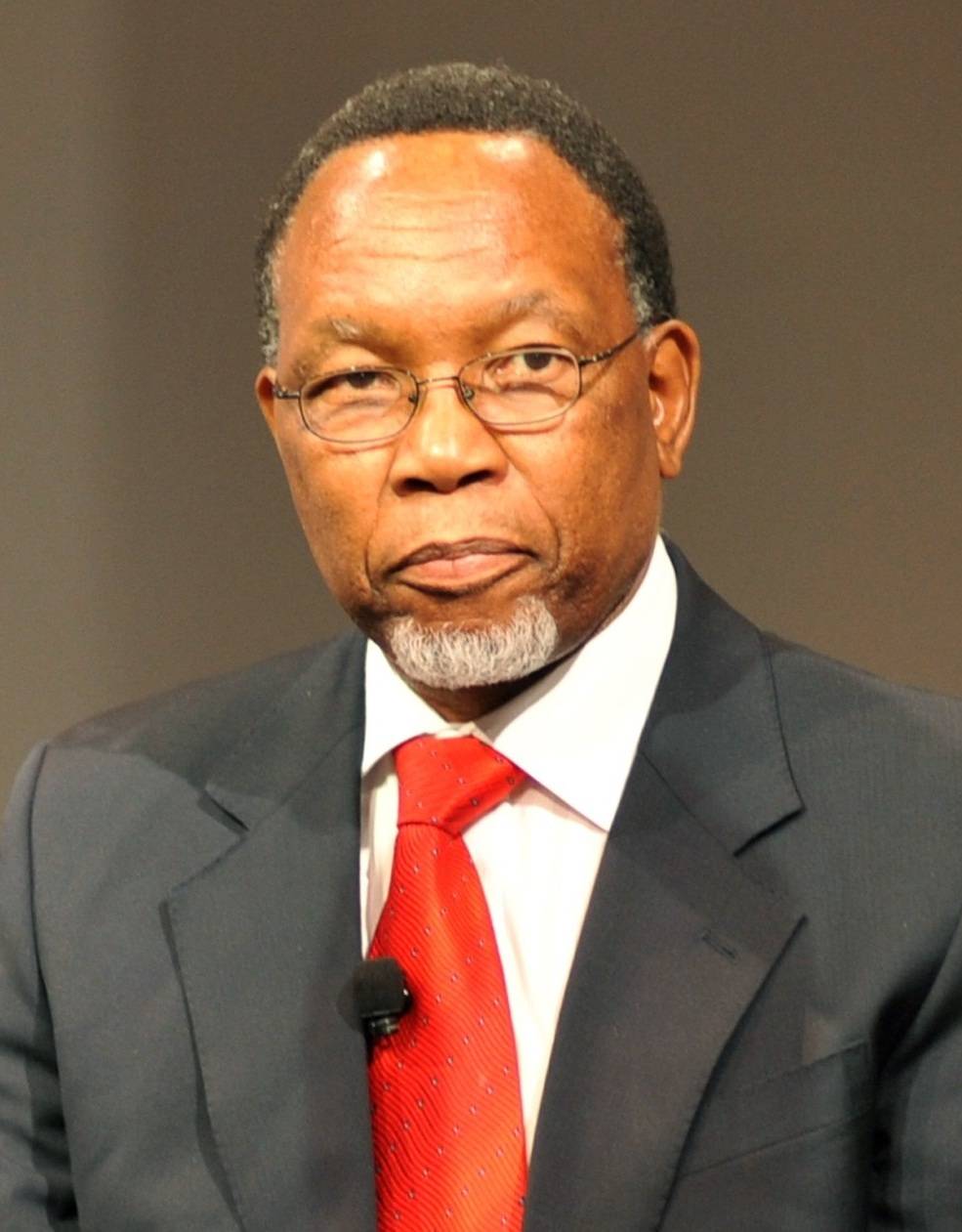
Motlanthe in June 2009.

Motlanthe is considered one of the leading leftist ANC intellectuals. He was reputed to be "a highly skilled political operator" by the time he became president. Motlanthe is known for being "ferociously private". According to former Minister in the Presidency Frank Chikane, he did not invite any family or guests to his presidential inauguration. He is also known for his restrained, measured demeanour, although his friends inside the ANC report that "he can be a great joker" and that he frequently defused bad moods among his Robben Island cohorts. The Financial Mail describes him as avuncular and "mild mannered, with an almost inborn presidential bearing". In 2008, journalist Fiona Forde wrote, using his nickname "Mkhuluwa" (English: "the Elder" or "Elder Brother"):

There are few in the ranks of the [ANC] who have a bad word to say about Mkhuluwa. To them he is the silent but strong force that exudes calm in a moment of panic – a man whose cool-headed outlook sees him through many a tough time. His is the voice of reason... He is an intellectual of note, a comrade whose door is always open. He possesses great wit which he unleashes with a dry sense of humour. Mkhuluwa is also a man of principles...

Many commentators agree that Motlanthe appeared to harbour little personal ambition for political advancement. In 2012, he told reporters that he was "not a politician". In early 2009, while president himself, he told journalist John Carlin: "Being president means you have no life of your own. I actually don't like it. I think you have to be insane or very, very special." Indeed, in 2007, he had said that he would prefer overseeing Bafana Bafana, the national soccer team, to becoming president. His own paradigm of good leadership seems to exclude personal ambition: on one occasion, he explained, "To volunteer leadership is the antithesis of democracy, which is about collective decisions and not individual ambitions"; on another, he said, "If you end up a leader it must be accidentally."However, Booysen argues that he probably had both the ability and the appetite to win another presidential term. According to Booysen, it was due to his adherence to the democratic centralism traditionally associated with the ANC that he opted not to push back against the instructions of the party. In either case, the grace with which he relinquished power to Zuma in 2009 has made him appear a trustworthy figure.

But comrades, revolution is deliberate. Revolution is never by accident – revolution is deliberate and it is methodical. And so it is important that we must always test whether we are organised correctly to advance the revolution.

— Motlanthe, exhibiting characteristic moderation

On the other hand, Motlanthe's "self-effacing" personality has also been connected to certain criticisms of his leadership style. Critics say that he was "inefficient, indecisive and lacking a backbone", or "indecisive at crucial times, too soft". Likewise, although his "unflappable" appearance and ability to rise above "scrappy factional battles" was sometimes perceived as a virtue, some supporters were disappointed by his detachment and unwillingness to "be their hero", motivated by what they perceived as "his desire to avoid a messy scrap and keep his image squeaky clean". The Witness said in December 2012: "The ANC and South Africa will never know what kind of leader Motlanthe could and would have been." Right2Know also criticised the discrepancy between Motlanthe's outward commitment to compromise and moderation, on the one hand, and his demonstrated commitment to implementing loyally the ANC party line on the other. It said that he "lulls [the public] into a false sense of security" by playing "good cop" to the ANC's "bad cop".

English diplomat and politician Robin Renwick said in 2012 that, after Mandela, Motlanthe was South Africa's most highly respected leader overseas, "seen to embody the best virtues of the old guard of the ANC". Motlanthe is viewed as having assumed an "elder statesman" role after his retirement, with the Sunday Times commenting in 2018 that he was the first of South Africa's former presidents to have found "the right role" in public life, in his case as "a reluctant president, a caretaker who stepped in to steady the ship and gracefully retreated to a lesser position, a custodian of democratic values and elder statesman."

== Personal life ==
In 1975, Motlanthe married Mapula Mokate. They were separated before he ascended to the presidency in 2008, and he filed for divorce in 2011. Their divorce was settled amicably in March 2014, and he married his longtime partner, businesswoman Gugu Mtshali, in May 2014 in Houghton, Johannesburg. He has three adult children with Mokate – Kagiso, Ntabiseng, and Kgomotso – and is a jazz enthusiast.

== See also ==
- History of the African National Congress

== Notes ==
Political offices
Preceded by Thabo Mbeki (as President); Ivy Matsepe-Casaburri (Acting President)	President of South Africa; 25 September 2008 – 9 May 2009	Succeeded by Jacob Zuma
Preceded by Baleka Mbete	Deputy President of South Africa; 9 May 2009 – 26 May 2014	Succeeded by Cyril Ramaphosa
Party political offices
Preceded by Cyril Ramaphosa	Secretary-General of the African National Congress; 1997–2007	Succeeded by Gwede Mantashe
Preceded by Jacob Zuma	Deputy President of the African National Congress; 2007–2012	Succeeded by Cyril Ramaphosa
Trade union offices
Preceded by Cyril Ramaphosa	General Secretary of the National Union of Mineworkers; 1991–1998	Succeeded by Gwede Mantashe
