= 2008 South African presidential election =

- 25 September 2008

400 votes in the National Assembly 201 votes needed to win
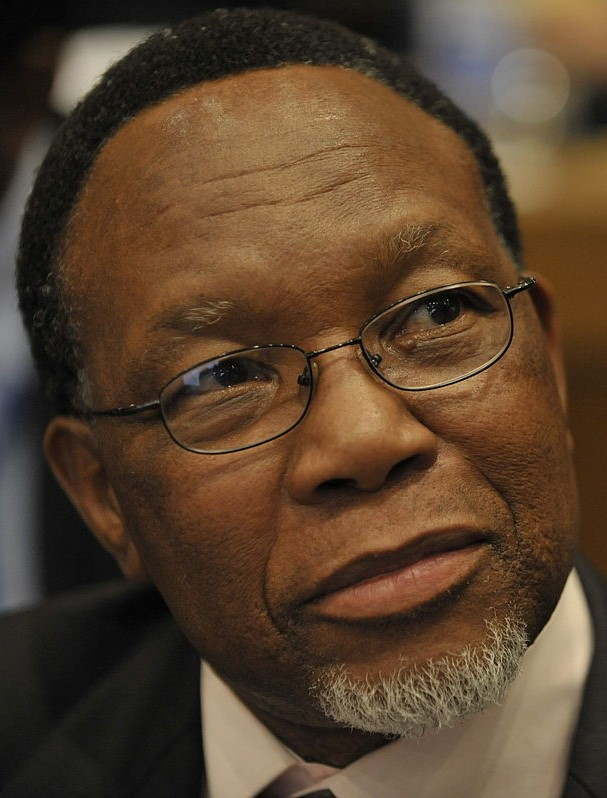

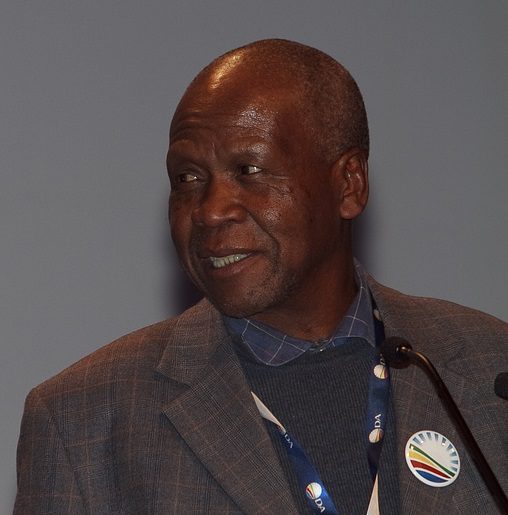
Nominee	Kgalema Motlanthe	Joe Seremane
Party	ANC	DA
Electoral vote	269	50
Percentage	84.3%	15.7%
President before election
Thabo Mbeki
Ivy Matsepe-Casaburri (acting)
ANC
Elected President
Kgalema Motlanthe
ANC

An indirect presidential election was held in South Africa on 25 September 2008 following the resignation of the President Thabo Mbeki. The ruling party, the African National Congress (ANC), with a two-thirds majority in the National Assembly of South Africa, elected Kgalema Motlanthe as president. The ANC indicated that Motlanthe would be a "caretaker" president until the 2009 election, after which ANC president Jacob Zuma would take office.

== Jacob Zuma's election as ANC President ==
=== Candidature for ANC President ===
In terms of party tradition, as the deputy president of the ANC, Zuma was in line to succeed Mbeki as president of the ANC, and, by implication, the president of South Africa in 2009. Zuma was elected as President of the ANC on 18 December 2007 with 2329 votes to Mbeki's 1505 votes, making him the clear favorite to become the next president of South Africa following the 2009 general election, since Mbeki was constitutionally unable to run again.

On 28 December 2007, the Scorpions served Zuma an indictment to stand trial in the High Court on various counts of racketeering, money laundering, corruption and fraud linked to the $5bn arms procurement deal by the South African government in 1999. The trial was to proceed on 4 August 2008. Zuma applied to the High Court to have the charges against him declared unlawful. Zuma's application was successful, and the ruling made inferences of political interference by Mbeki and others in Zuma's prosecution.

== Resignation of Mbeki ==
As a result of the judge's inferences that Mbeki had interfered in Zuma's prosecution, the ANC National Executive Committee's decided to withdraw parliamentary support for Mbeki. Without that support, Mbeki formally announced his resignation on 21 September 2008. Parliament convened on 22 September and accepted the resignation with effect from 25 September, with 299 votes in favour to 10 against.

In cases of such a void in the presidency, the constitution requires that the replacement elected by parliament to serve as the interim president until the next general election must be either the Deputy President, the Speaker of Parliament, or a Member of Parliament. ANC president Jacob Zuma was not eligible as he did not hold any of those positions at the time. Deputy President Phumzile Mlambo-Ngcuka was not supported by parliament, apparently due to her close ties to Mbeki and because her husband, Bulelani Ngcuka was involved in the decision to charge Zuma with corruption. Zuma said that the deputy president of the ANC, Kgalema Motlanthe, would become acting president until the 2009 general elections: "I am convinced - if given that responsibility - he (Motlanthe) would be equal to the task." This was confirmed by the ANC.

== Election ==
In the parliamentary election, the ANC nominated Motlanthe, while the official opposition Democratic Alliance nominated Joe Seremane, its party chairman. Motlanthe was elected with 269 votes out of 361 cast to Seremane's 50.

== See also ==
- Politics of South Africa
