= The Black Market Concierge =

2016 non-fiction book

- Author: Barry Oberholzer
- Language: English
- Genre: Non-fiction
- Publisher: Black Box Entertainment
- Publication date: 2016-11-26
- Publication place: USA
- Media type: Paperback
- Pages: 193
- ISBN: 978-1540568205

The Black Market Concierge is a 2016 American book written by former professional rugby player and intelligence operative Barry Oberholzer. The book is about Barry Oberholzer's secret life as a confidential informant for the CIA and other intelligence agencies. It has become the first book in which the NFT project of a TV series has been made.

== Plot ==
The Black Market Concierge takes readers inside the counter intelligence world, showing the daily life of zealous men set on greed, extortion and power.

Since his sanction-breaking activities made headlines in 2012, the South African government has attempted to politically prosecute Oberholzer on multiple fronts, all while international smuggling cartels were on the hunt for him. The book provides a look at his dangerous life as an undercover confidential informant, as Oberholzer traveled the world for missions targeting its most dangerous cartels, smugglers and corrupts politicians and gives insight into the world's most powerful intelligence agencies.

== NFT Project ==
The Black Market Concierge is being adapted into a television series as NFT project. NFT copies of the book will be treated as a limited-edition version of the show
