= Phumzile Mlambo-Ngcuka =

South African politician (1955–2026)

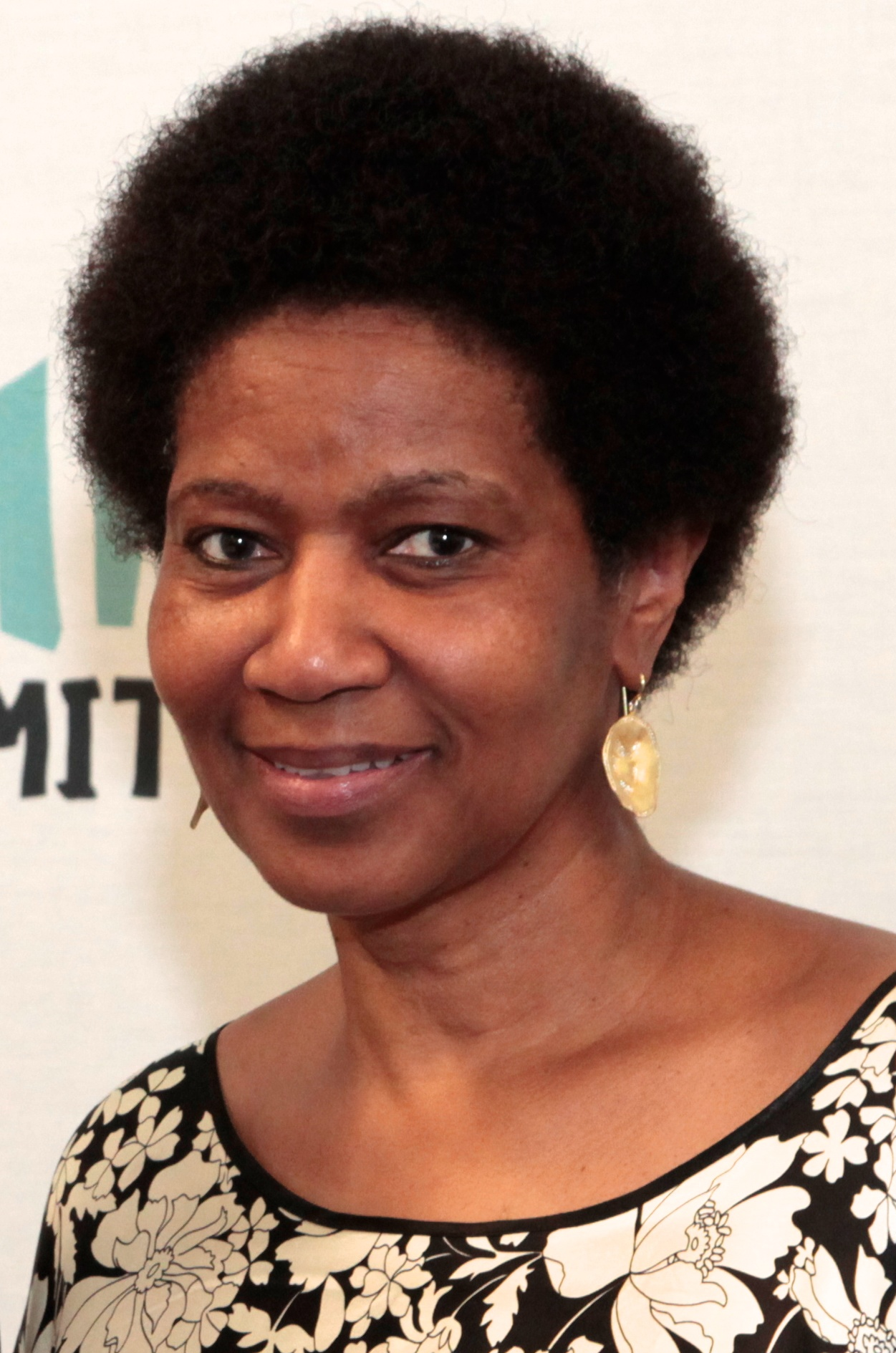
- Mlambo-Ngcuka in 2014

Under-Secretary-General of the United Nations Executive Director of UN Women
- In office 13 August 2013 – 19 August 2021
- Secretary General: Ban Ki-moon; António Guterres
- Preceded by: Michelle Bachelet
- Succeeded by: Sima Sami Bahous

4th Deputy President of South Africa
- In office 22 June 2005 – 23 September 2008
- President: Thabo Mbeki
- Preceded by: Jacob Zuma
- Succeeded by: Baleka Mbete

Minister of Minerals and Energy
- In office 17 June 1999 – 21 June 2005
- President: Nelson Mandela; Thabo Mbeki
- Preceded by: Penuell Maduna
- Succeeded by: Lindiwe Hendricks

Acting Minister of Arts, Culture, Science and Technology
- In office 3 February 2004 – 30 April 2004
- President: Thabo Mbeki
- Succeeded by: Ben Ngubane

Member of the National Assembly of South Africa
- In office 27 April 1994 – September 2008
- Preceded by: Constituency established
- Succeeded by: Andries Nel
- Constituency: KwaZulu-Natal

Deputy Provincial Chairperson of the African National Congress in Western Cape
- In office April 1994 – 1996
- Chairperson: Chris Nissen
- Preceded by: Position established
- Succeeded by: Nomaindia Mfeketo
Additional offices 2007–2026
Chancellor of the University of Johannesburg
In office September 2022 – 20 November 2026
Vice-Chancellor	Tshilidzi Marwala
Preceded by	Njabulo Ndebele
Chancellor of the Tshwane University of Technology
In office 7 November 2007 – 10 June 2015
Succeeded by	Gwen Ramokgopa

Personal details
- Born: Phumzile Mhlambo; 3 November 1955 Clermont, KwaZulu-Natal, Union of South Africa
- Died: 20 November 2026 (aged 71)
- Party: African National Congress (1994–2009, 2009–2026)
- Other political affiliations: Congress of the People (2009)
- Spouse: Bulelani Ngcuka
- Children: 5
- Education: National University of Lesotho (BA); University of Cape Town (MPhil); Warwick University (DEng)
- Occupation: Politician; diplomat; educator; consultant; businesswoman; human rights activist

Phumzile Mlambo-Ngcuka (Zulu pronunciation: [pʰumziːle m̩lamboᵑǀʱuːkʼa]; 3 November 1955 – 20 November 2026) was a South African politician and United Nations official, who served as the Executive Director of UN Women with the rank of Under-Secretary-General of the United Nations.

Mlambo-Ngcuka served as Deputy President of South Africa from 2005 to 2008 and was the first woman to hold the office. During her period as deputy president of South Africa, she oversaw programmes to combat poverty and ensure the poor benefit from the advantages of a growing economy.

== Early life and education ==
Mlambo-Ngcuka was born on 3 November 1955 in Clermont, KwaZulu-Natal. She obtained a bachelor's degree in social science and education from the National University of Lesotho in 1980, as well as a master's degree in philosophy from the University of Cape Town in 2003, which dealt with educational planning and policy. In 2013 she completed a doctorate from the University of Warwick. The work covered using mobile technologies to support Teacher Development in resource poor nations. She was awarded an honorary doctorate from Nelson Mandela Metropolitan University in 2014.

== Youth development ==
From 1981 to 1983 Mlambo-Ngcuka taught in KwaZulu-Natal, after which she moved to Geneva to work with the World Young Women's Christian Association (YWCA) from 1984 to 1989, as the organisation's Youth Director, where she advocated for job creation for young people within the UN system and promoted development education in Africa, Asia and the Middle East. She was also the first president of the Natal Organisation of Women. During this time she also founded and directed the Young Women's International Programme.

From 1987 to 1989 Mlambo-Ngcuka was director of TEAM, a developmental non-government organisation (NGO) in Cape Town, as well as being involved with squatter women and African independent churches to promote economic self-reliance and running skills training programmes. From 1990 to 1992 she was director of World University Service, a funding agency, as well as being involved in the management of funds donated to development organisations by Swedish and Swiss government development agencies. She started and managed her own management consulting company, Phumelela Services, during 1993 and 1994.

Throughout her career, Mlambo-Ngcuka directed her energy towards issues of human rights, gender and youth development, equality and social justice.

== Career in national politics ==
=== Member of Parliament ===
In 1994 Mlambo-Ngcuka became a Member of Parliament, chairing the Public Service Portfolio Committee. She was deputy minister in the Department of Trade and Industry (DTI) from 1996 until 1999, during which time she also was a founding member of the Guguletu Community Development Corporation. From 1997 she served as member of the national executive committee of the African National Congress (ANC), as well as being the provincial vice-chairperson of the ANC Western Cape.

Mlambo-Ngcuka was Minister of Minerals and Energy from June 1999 to June 2005. During this time she was a driving force behind the government's policy of creating New Order Mining Rights which ended a period where big mining firms which controlled nearly all South Africa's minerals reserves, were able to hold mining rights to them in perpetuity. Mlambo-Ngcuka's policy of 'use it or lose it' created a situation where mining rights became available to a much broader segment of the population including many previously disadvantaged black people. She served as acting Minister of Arts, Culture, Science and Technology from February 2004 to April 2004.

She led the Southern African Development Community mission to observe the 2005 Zimbabwe parliamentary election, which congratulated "the people of Zimbabwe for holding a peaceful, credible and well-mannered election which reflects the will of the people."

==== Oilgate ====
During Mlambo-Ngcuka's tenure as Minister of Minerals and Energy, the parastatal company PetroSA made an advance payment of ZAR15 million (approx. $1.5 million) to a private company Imvume, which in turn made a ZAR11 million donation to the ANC ahead of the 2004 elections. It is alleged that Imvume has close links to the ANC. These events have been dubbed the "Oilgate" scandal by South African media.

Although there was never any evidence that Mlambo-Ngcuka was involved in any way, media reports cast suspicion on her behaviour. In order to clear her name, Mlambo-Ngcuka asked South Africa's Public Protector to investigate the issue. The subsequent report cleared her completely. Because Mlambo-Ngcuka's brother Bonga Mlambo was involved with Imvume on a planned hotel project at the time, he was at first alleged to have been involved in Imvume's oil business. These allegations also proved to be groundless.

=== Deputy President ===
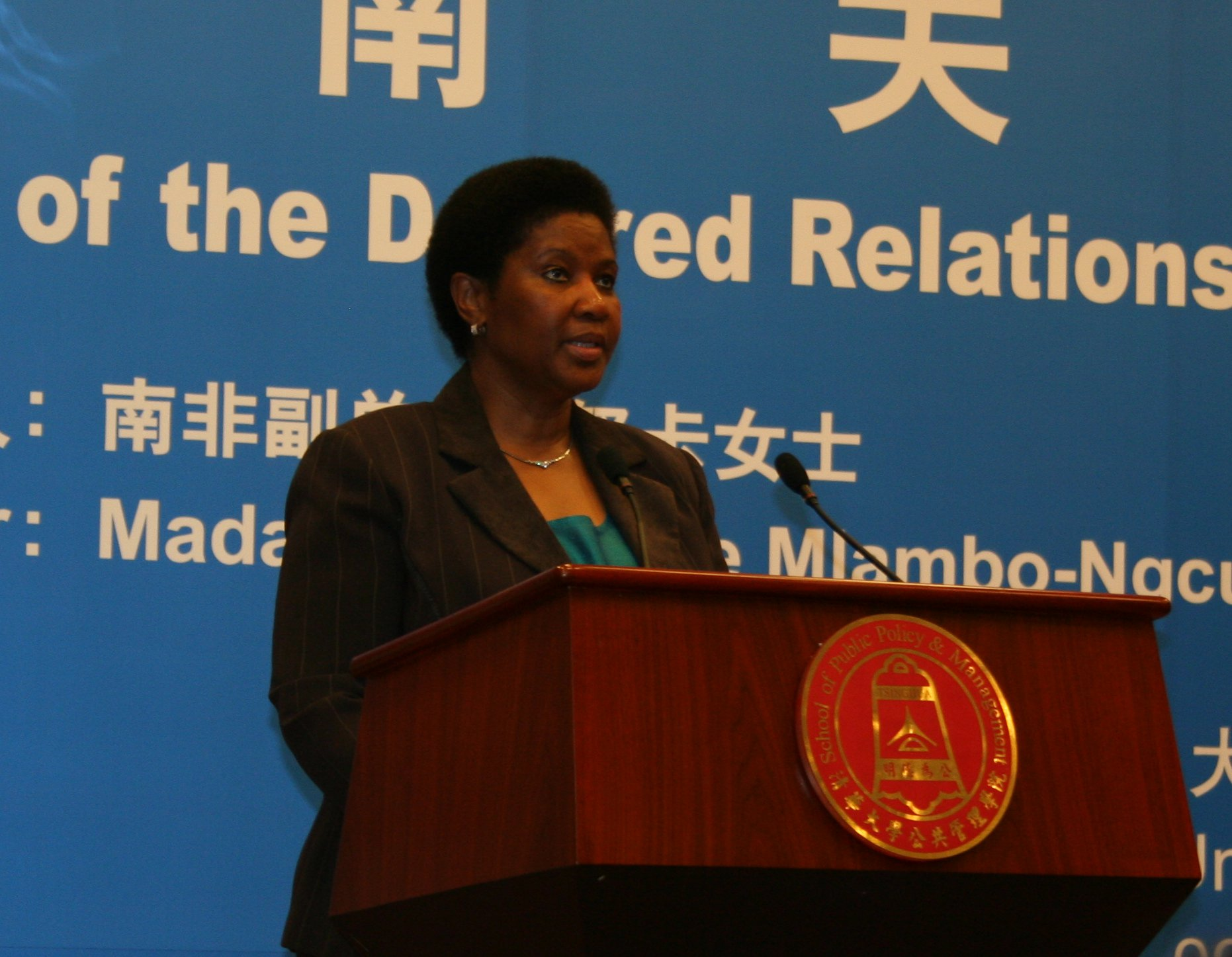
Then South African Deputy President Phumzile Mlambo-Ngcuka giving a speech at Tsinghua University's School of Public Policy and Management on Sino-South African relations in 2007.

On 22 June 2005, President Thabo Mbeki appointed her as deputy president of South Africa, after he relieved Jacob Zuma of the post the week before. Mlambo-Ngcuka's husband, Bulelani Ngcuka, was head of South Africa's National Directorate of Public Prosecutions at the time and charged with fighting organised crime. It was the NDPP which had determined that criminal charges should be brought against Zuma. It is Zuma's position that the charges against him are politically motivated. Soon after her appointment she was booed by Zuma supporters at a rally in KwaZulu-Natal, an incident that was not covered by the public broadcaster, the SABC, which led to accusations of bias. In August 2005, commenting on the slow pace of the Willing Buyer Willing Seller land reform program in South Africa, she stated that South Africa could learn about land reform from Zimbabwe. This comment caused alarm and was condemned by the parliamentary opposition.

In December 2007, she lost her position on the ANC's National Executive Committee after party delegates elected a pro-Zuma slate.

President Mbeki resigned in September 2008 after the National Executive Committee, objecting to Mbeki's alleged role in Jacob Zuma's prosecution for criminal activities, decided to recall him. On 23 September, in the wake of this, most of the South African cabinet resigned, Mlambo-Ngcuka among them.

Mlambo-Ngcuka joined COPE in late February 2009, but shortly after rejoined the ANC.

== Executive Director of UN Women ==
On 10 July 2013, Mlambo-Ngcuka was appointed Executive Director of the United Nations Entity for Gender Equality and Empowerment of Women (UN Women) by United Nations Secretary-General Ban Ki-moon. She was sworn into Executive Director of UN Women on 19 August 2013. She succeeded Michelle Bachelet.

Under Mlambo-Ngcuka's leadership, UN Women worked with Publicis and Ogilvy on launching the HeForShe campaign. In November 2017 Mlambo-Ngcuka welcomed the Elsie Initiative to help increase women's participation in peacekeeping operations in a joint statement with fellow UN Under-Secretary-General Pramila Patten.

In addition to her role at UN Women, Mlambo-Ngcuka also served a two-year term as member of the World Bank Group's (WBG) Advisory Council on Gender and Development from 2015 until 2017. In November 2018, United Nations Secretary General António Guterres appointed her to the United Nations' Task Force on Digital Financing of Sustainable Development Goals, co-chaired by Maria Ramos and Achim Steiner.

She was awarded Cannes LionHeart Award in 2019 for her work for UN Women and Unstereotype Alliance.

Mlambo-Ngcuka left UN Women in August 2021 after serving two terms.

Mlambo-Ngcuka mobilized 40 billion USD in financial commitments from Member States, private sector, philanthropies and civil society as well as young people. These commitments have formed Generational Equality to drive transformative change for women and girls worldwide.

List of Publications

- Progress towards gender parity still slow, uneven- Interview: Phumzile Mlambo-Ngcuka
- The United Nations at 70 and the ongoing quest for gender equality
- Becoming UN Women: A journey in realizing rights and gaining global recognition
- Sexual Health and Women's Rights
- Mobile learning facilitated ICT teacher development : innovation report
- Rural women: the invisible mainstay of sustainability
- UN Women bids farewell to Phumzile Mlambo-Ngcuka

== Other activities ==
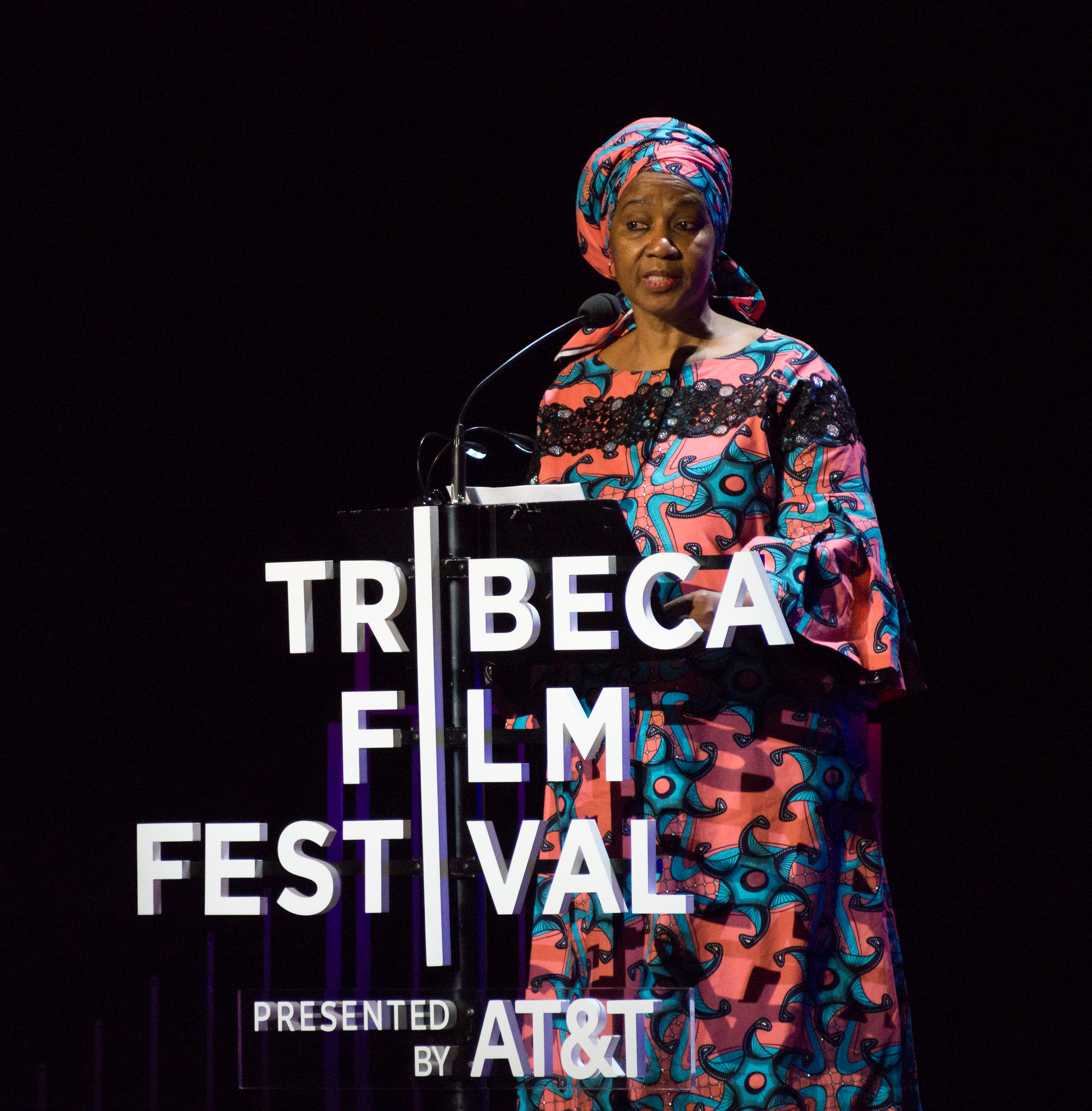
Mlambo-Ngcuka presenting at a Time's Up event on sexual harassment at the 2018 Tribeca Film Festival.

- Joint United Nations Programme on HIV/AIDS (UNAIDS), Ex-Officio Member of the Committee of Cosponsoring Organizations (2013–2026)
- Global Partnership to End Violence Against Children, Member of the Board (2016–2026)
- Princess Sabeeka Bint Ibrahim Al Khalifa Global Award for Women's Empowerment, Member of the International Jury (2016–2026)
- African Leadership Academy (ALA), Member of the Global Advisory Council
- International Gender Champions (IGC), Member
- Mandela Rhodes Foundation, Member of the Board of Trustees

In late 2022, Mlambo-Ngcuka acted as one of the mediators for peace negotiations between the Ethiopian government and the Tigray People's Liberation Front (TPLF), in order to end the Tigray War. On 2 November 2022, a peace treaty was signed in Pretoria between Ethiopia and the TPLF, which formally ended the war on 3 November.

== Personal life and death ==
Mlambo-Ngcuka was married to the former head of the National Prosecuting Authority, Bulelani Ngcuka. They had five children, four of whom were adopted.

Mlambo-Ngcuka died due to complications from a medical procedure on 20 November 2026, at the age of 71.

Political offices
Preceded by Jacob Zuma	Deputy President of South Africa; 2005–2008	Succeeded by Baleka Mbete
