= Baleka Mbete =

South African politician (born 1949)

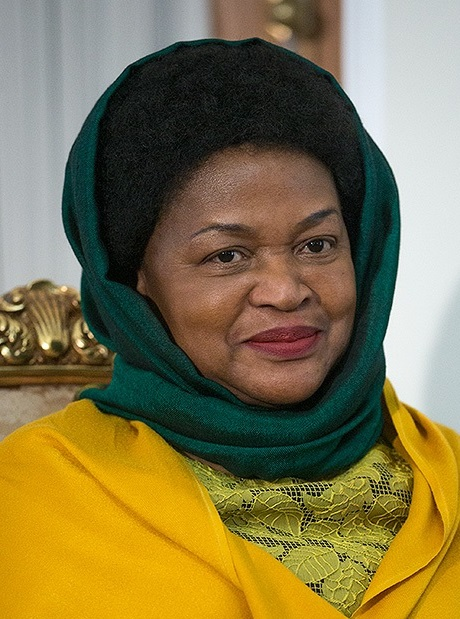
- Mbete in 2016

5th Deputy President of South Africa
- In office 25 September 2008 – 9 May 2009
- President: Kgalema Motlanthe
- Preceded by: Phumzile Mlambo-Ngcuka
- Succeeded by: Kgalema Motlanthe

2nd and 5th Speaker of the National Assembly of South Africa
- In office 21 May 2014 – 21 May 2019
- President: Jacob Zuma; Cyril Ramaphosa
- Deputy: Lechesa Tsenoli
- Preceded by: Max Sisulu
- Succeeded by: Thandi Modise
- In office 12 July 2004 – 25 September 2008
- President: Thabo Mbeki
- Deputy: Gwen Mahlangu-Nkabinde
- Preceded by: Frene Ginwala
- Succeeded by: Gwen Mahlangu-Nkabinde
Other legislative offices
Member of the National Assembly
In office 9 May 1994 – 9 May 2009
In office 21 May 2014 – 7 May 2019
Deputy Speaker of the National Assembly
In office May 1996 – April 2004
President	Nelson Mandela; Thabo Mbeki
Speaker	Frene Ginwala
Preceded by	Bhadra Ranchod
Succeeded by	Gwen Mahlangu-Nkabinde
Party offices
National Chairperson of the African National Congress
In office 18 December 2007 – 18 December 2017
President	Jacob Zuma
Preceded by	Mosiuoa Lekota
Succeeded by	Gwede Mantashe
Secretary-General of the African National Congress Women's League
In office April 1991 – December 1993
President	Gertrude Shope
Succeeded by	Nosiviwe Mapisa-Nqakula

Personal details
- Born: 24 September 1949 (age 76) Clermont, Durban; Natal, Union of South Africa
- Party: African National Congress
- Spouses: Nape Khomo (m. 2016) Keorapetse Kgositsile (m. 1978; div. 1992)
- Education: Inanda Seminary School; Lovedale Teachers' College

Baleka Mbete (born 24 September 1949) is a South African politician who served as the 5th deputy president of South Africa from September 2008 to May 2009. She was also the Speaker of the National Assembly for two non-consecutive terms from 2004 to 2008 and from 2014 to 2019. She also served as Deputy Speaker between 1996 and 2004. A member of the African National Congress (ANC), she was first elected to the National Assembly in 1994 and stepped down from her seat in 2019.

Born in KwaZulu-Natal, Mbete is a teacher by training and a former anti-apartheid activist, initially through the Black Consciousness Movement. Between 1976 and 1990, she was stationed with the ANC in exile outside South Africa; during this period, she was also a prominent cultural activist as a poet and the head of the Medu Art Ensemble. Upon her return to South Africa, she represented the ANC at the negotiations to end apartheid and was a central figure in the relaunch of the ANC Women's League, serving as the league's secretary-general from 1991 to 1993.

Mbete was elected to the National Assembly in the first post-apartheid elections in 1994 and served in her seat until 2019, with the exception of a hiatus from 2009 to 2014. Her rise through the institution began in 1996, when she was elected as Deputy Speaker, and continued during the third democratic Parliament, when she succeeded Frene Ginwala as the second Speaker. In the last year of the third Parliament, she ascended to the Deputy Presidency during the reshuffle occasioned by the resignation of President Thabo Mbeki in September 2008; she held the office during the brief term of Mbeki's successor, President Kgalema Motlanthe.

Although she declined to return to Parliament after the 2009 general election, Mbete returned in May 2014 in her former office as Speaker of the National Assembly. She left her parliamentary seat again after the 2019 general election, though she remained active in the ANC Women's League.

A member of the ANC since 1976, Mbete served as the party's National Chairperson from December 2007 to December 2017 during Jacob Zuma's presidency. She was a member of the ANC National Executive Committee from 1994 to 2022.

== Early life and education ==
Mbete was born on 24 September 1949 to a Hlubi family in Clermont, a township in Durban in the former Natal Province. She spent part of her childhood with her grandmother in the Northern Transvaal, where she attended pre-school. In 1958, her family moved to the Cape Province so that her father could take up work as a librarian at Fort Hare University. He later lost his job because of his affiliation with the South African Communist Party. Her mother was a nurse, and she was the second child and eldest daughter in the family.

After matriculating from the Inanda Seminary in 1968, Mbete enrolled in Eshowe Training College in Eshowe and later – after she was expelled from Eshowe – in the teaching college at Lovedale in Alice. She qualified as a teacher in 1973 and returned to Durban to teach at a high school in KwaMashu.

== Anti-apartheid activism ==
While teaching in Natal, Mbete became involved in the Black Consciousness Movement, which at the time was ascendant in the struggle against apartheid. In early 1976, Mbete and her brother were detained for their political activism. Upon her release, she went into exile, leaving South Africa for Swaziland on 10 April 1976.

=== Exile: 1976–1990 ===
In exile, Mbete joined the anti-apartheid African National Congress (ANC). She also taught at a high school in Mbabane, Swaziland until 1977, when she moved to Dar es Salaam, Tanzania. In Dar es Salaam, she pursued her ANC work with earnest, joining the party's Department of Information and Publicity – specifically, she worked on Radio Freedom – as well as its Women's Section, the department that substituted for the then-defunct ANC Women's League. Mbete was regional secretary for the Women's Section in Tanzania from 1978 to 1981.

From 1981 to 1983, she was an ANC public relations officer in Nairobi, Kenya, where her husband worked. Later she took posts in Gaborone, Botswana (1983 to 1986); Harare, Zimbabwe (1986 to 1987); and Lusaka, Zambia (1987 to 1990). In addition to her work with the Women's Section, she was involved in cultural activism and education, including as head of the Medu Art Ensemble; she was also a published poet, writing under her married name, Baleka Kgositsile.

=== Transition: 1990–1994 ===
Mbete returned to South Africa from exile in June 1990. In subsequent years, she was a member of the ANC's delegation to the negotiations to end apartheid. In addition, the ANC Women's League was relaunched in August 1990, and Mbete served on the interim leadership corps that oversaw its re-establishment. At the league's first elective conference in April 1991, held in Kimberley, Mbete was elected as secretary-general of the league, serving under president Gertrude Shope. She served a single term in the position: at the second elective conference in December 1993, Nosiviwe Mapisa-Nqakula was elected to succeed her.

== Career in government ==
In South Africa's first post-apartheid elections in April 1994, Mbete was elected to represent the ANC in the National Assembly – the beginning of her 25-year tenure in the lower house of the South African Parliament. In addition, at the ANC's 49th National Conference in December 1994, she was elected to her first of several terms in the ANC's National Executive Committee; by number of votes received, she was ranked 17th of the 60 ordinary members elected to the committee.

In 1995, Mbete was appointed as chair of the ANC's parliamentary caucus and as a member of the Presidential Panel on the Truth and Reconciliation Commission.

=== Deputy Speaker: 1996–2004 ===
In May 1996, she was promoted to deputise Frene Ginwala as Deputy Speaker of the National Assembly; she succeeded Bhadra Ranchod, who was appointed as an ambassador. On 14 June 1999, after that year's general election, she was re-elected to a full term as Deputy Speaker; she beat the opposition candidate, Dene Smuts of the Democratic Party, in a vote, receiving 326 votes against Smuts's 47.

During this period, in April 1997, it transpired that Mbete had received an improperly issued driver's license at a testing centre in Mpumalanga. Mbete was quoted as saying that she was too busy to wait in a queue for her driving test, although she later denied having said this. The scandal led to a broader investigation into corruption into the Mpumalanga traffic department and to the dismissal of a provincial minister, though Mbete was not charged with wrongdoing and maintained that she had been "caught up in a web of impropriety of which I was unaware".

=== First term as Speaker: 2004–2008 ===
In the aftermath of the 2004 general election, the ANC announced that it would nominate Mbete to replace Frene Ginwala as Speaker of the National Assembly. She was elected unopposed to the office on 23 April 2004, with Gwen Mahlangu as her deputy.

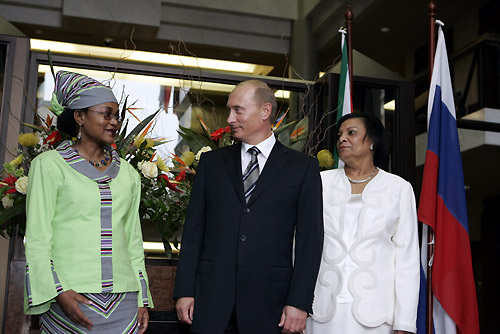
Mbete (left) meets with Russian President Vladimir Putin during his 2006 visit to South Africa

Mbete's term as Speaker coincided with the Travelgate scandal, which pertained to the abuse of parliamentary travel vouchers by politicians. The Mail & Guardian said that she was at the forefront of the ANC's "damage limitation exercise" in that regard. She also publicly demonstrated support for Tony Yengeni, an ANC politician who was convicted of defrauding Parliament in 2003; she even accompanied Yengeni to Pollsmoor Prison in 2006 when he reported to serve his prison sentence. However, Mbete maintained that she was committed to strengthening Parliament and its committees, saying that she had an inherited "an institution that was a rubber stamp". Her efforts in this regard apparently led her into conflict with Zingile Dingani, the Secretary to Parliament, who sought an expanded mandate for his own office.

In January 2006, Mbete chartered a jet, at a cost of R471,900 (around $60,000), to attend the inauguration of Ellen Johnson Sirleaf as President of Liberia. The only other passenger on the plane was a member of her staff. Ferial Haffajee criticised the expenditure as wasteful.

==== Election to ANC chairmanship ====
In the middle of her term as Speaker, Mbete was nominated to stand for an ANC leadership position during the party's 52nd National Conference, which was held in Polokwane in December 2007. She was initially nominated for the position of deputy secretary-general, but she withdrew from that race when she was unexpectedly nominated, from the floor of the conference, to stand for the party chairmanship; Tokyo Sexwale had been nominated for the chair, but he announced that he would withdraw in Mbete's favour in order to promote "the empowerment of women".

The following day, on 18 December 2007, Mbete won election to a five-year term as ANC national chairperson. Aligned to winning presidential candidate Jacob Zuma, she defeated Joel Netshitenzhe – who was aligned to outgoing president Thabo Mbeki – in a landslide, receiving 61% of the vote.

=== Deputy President: 2008–2009 ===
On 20 September 2008, the ANC announced that it had asked Mbeki to resign as President of South Africa. He tendered his resignation to Mbete's office the following day.

It had been speculated that Mbete would succeed Mbeki as President, which would have made her the first female head of state in South Africa's history; however, the ANC announced that Kgalema Motlanthe, Deputy President of the ANC, would assume that position. On 23 September, Mbete was announced by the SABC as the most likely candidate for Deputy President of South Africa following Phumzile Mlambo-Ngcuka's resignation from the position.

On 25 September 2008, she was appointed by Motlanthe as Deputy President.

=== Hiatus from Parliament: 2009–2014 ===
In the next general election in April 2009, Mbete was re-elected to her parliamentary seat but, somewhat dramatically, declined to be sworn in as a Member of Parliament on 6 May, despite being present at the inauguration. Incoming President Jacob Zuma announced that Kgalema Motlanthe would replace her as Deputy President, and the ANC said that she would move to Luthuli House to pursue her party work full-time instead of returning to Parliament. Mbete denied that the confusion over her swearing-in had arisen because she was holding out for reappointment as Deputy President, saying, "It was always an interim arrangement."

By December 2009, the Daily Maverick observed that Mbete had "departed the public political stage" for reasons that remained mysterious to the public. However, she completed her term as ANC national chairperson, and she was comfortably re-elected to a second term in that office on 18 December 2012, at the ANC's 53rd National Conference; she beat Thandi Modise with 76% of the vote.

=== Second term as Speaker: 2014–2019 ===
Mbete returned to an ANC seat in the National Assembly in the 2014 general election, and the party nominated her to return to her prior office as Speaker of the National Assembly. During the assembly's first sitting on 21 May 2014, she easily defeated the opposition candidate, receiving 260 votes compared to the 88 cast for Nosimo Balindlela of the Democratic Alliance.

==== Allegations of bias ====
On 10 September 2014, five opposition parties, including the Democratic Alliance and Economic Freedom Fighters, stated that they planned to submit a motion of no confidence in Mbete, and claimed that she could not simultaneously serve as chairwoman of the ANC and as Speaker of the National Assembly. A debate held in Parliament on 16 September resulted in the motion being rejected by 234 votes to none. This was a result of opposition parties collectively walking out of the house after the ANC tried to change the vote into one of confidence in Mbete instead.

More generally, Mbete has faced accusations, over the course of several years, that she is biased in favour of the ANC and a puppet of President Zuma. In March 2016, the Constitutional Court held, in Economic Freedom Fighters v Speaker of the National Assembly, that the National Assembly under Mbete's stewardship had breached the South African Constitution by undermining rather than implementing the Public Protector's Nkandla report.

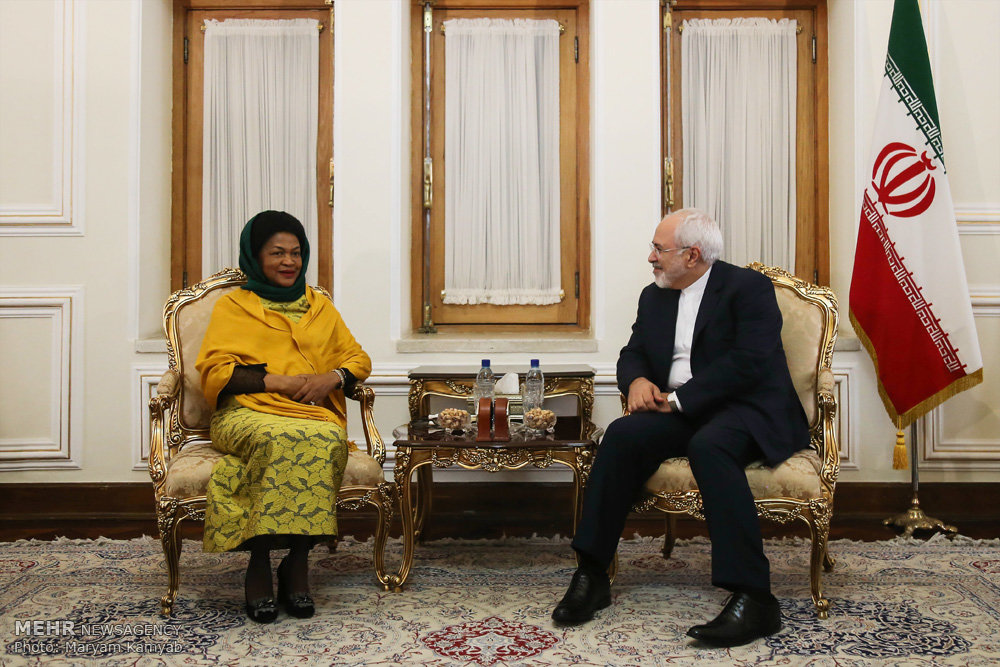
Mbete with Iranian foreign minister Javad Zarif in September 2017

==== ANC presidential campaign ====
In the run-up to the ANC's 54th National Conference, which would elect Zuma's successor as ANC president, Mbete identified herself as a presidential contender as early as April 2016. The ANC Women's League endorsed another candidate – Nkosazana Dlamini-Zuma – and Mbete was not viewed as a frontrunner, but she continued to campaign, under the banner #BM17, until the conference was held in December 2017. On the first night of the conference, however, Mbete endorsed Cyril Ramaphosa – Dlamini-Zuma's main rival – for the presidency. It was reported that she supported Ramaphosa because she was disappointed that Zuma had not supported her campaign.

Mbete did not run for re-election as national chairperson at the conference and did not appear on the ballot paper for any top leadership position, but she was re-elected to the National Executive Committee. In the assessment of the Mail & Guardian, Mbete's influence in the party declined after her failed presidential campaign.

==== Succession and aftermath ====
Ahead of the 2019 general election, Mbete told the Sowetan that she did not know "what's coming in the next couple of months". When the election was held in May, she was re-elected to her parliamentary seat, but, on 20 May, the ANC announced that it would nominate Thandi Modise, the outgoing head of the National Council of Provinces, to succeed Mbete as Speaker. The following day, the ANC confirmed rumours that Mbete had withdrawn her name from the party list, meaning that she would not return to her parliamentary seat.

In March 2022, Mbete told Radio 702 that she was "done with politics". However, two months later, she was appointed as the interim convener of the ANC Women's League after the league's incumbent leadership was disbanded by the National Executive Committee. In that capacity she led the league, with interim coordinator Maropene Ramokgopa, until a new leadership corps was elected. At the mainstream ANC's 55th National Conference in December 2022, she was not re-elected to the National Executive Committee, losing her seat for the first time since 1994.

== Commercial interests ==
Mbete's links to business have been questioned. She and provincial secretary of the ANC in the Northern Cape Dr K M Seimelo are shareholders in Dyambu Holdings, which is involved in building the massive Gautrain public transport project in the province of Gauteng. Dyambu Holdings is reported to have had links with slain magnate Brett Kebble. In 2010, she was implicated in a R25 million Gold Fields bribe under the guise of a "BEE" transaction by US investigators.

== Personal life ==
Mbete married Keorapetse Kgositsile, an exiled writer and poet, in 1978. They divorced in 1992, and she remarried to Nape Khomo, a businessman, in 2016. She has three sons and two daughters.

Political offices
Preceded by Frene Ginwala	Speaker of the National Assembly; 2004–2008	Succeeded by Gwen Mahlangu-Nkabinde
Preceded by Phumzile Mlambo-Ngcuka	Deputy President of South Africa; 2008–2009	Succeeded by Kgalema Motlanthe
Preceded by Max Sisulu	Speaker of the National Assembly; 2014–2019	Succeeded by Thandi Modise
