= Bhadra Ranchod =

South African politician and diplomat

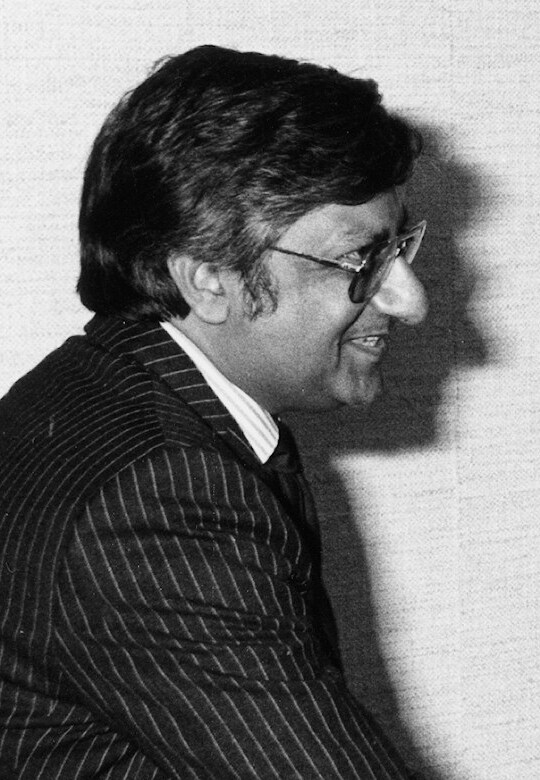

Deputy Speaker of the National Assembly
- In office 9 May 1994 – March 1996
- Speaker: Frene Ginwala
- Preceded by: Position established
- Succeeded by: Baleka Mbete

Member of the National Assembly
- In office 9 May 1994 – March 1996

Minister of Tourism
- In office February 1993 – April 1994
- President: F. W. de Klerk
- Preceded by: Org Marais
- Succeeded by: Dawie de Villiers

Personal details
- Born: 1943 or 1944 (age 82–83)
- Citizenship: South Africa
- Party: National Party
- Education: University of Cape Town; Leiden University

Bhadrakumar Ghaloo "Bhadra" Ranchod (born 11 May 1944) is a retired South African politician, diplomat, and lawyer who served as Deputy Speaker of the National Assembly from May 1994 to March 1996. He represented the National Party and previously served as Minister of Tourism for a brief period from 1993 to 1994 under President F. W. de Klerk.

Ranchod was the head of private law at the University of Durban-Westville until 1986, when he accepted appointment as South African Ambassador to the European Common Market and became South Africa's first non-white ambassador. He resigned from the National Assembly in March 1996 in order to take up another diplomatic posting as South African High Commissioner to Australia.

== Early life and academic career ==
Ranchod was born in 1944 and was classified as Indian under apartheid. He studied law at the University of Cape Town and completed his postgraduate education abroad at the University of Leiden.

From 1974 to 1986, he was the head of the private law department at the University of Durban-Westville, a majority-Indian university. He also served as the dean of the university's law school from 1976 to 1979, and in 1985 he was appointed to the board of the South African Broadcasting Corporation.

== Apartheid government ==
In 1986, Ranchod was named as South African Ambassador to the European Common Market in Brussels and thus became the country's first non-white ambassador. On serving the government during the prevailing racially charged civil conflict, Ranchod said:

There is violence in the country that is not doing anyone any good. One has got to try to work for a more just society. I hope to be able to do so in my new position. I have consistently supported the protection of human rights in South Africa. I have not departed from that.

In May 1987, UPI reported that Ranchod had twice applied unsuccessfully for an exemption from the Group Areas Act, seeking permission to buy a home near his university in the white-designated suburb of Westville, Durban.

In February 1993, President F. W. de Klerk announced that he had appointed Ranchod to his cabinet in a reshuffle, naming him as Minister of Tourism. He and two others appointed at the same time – Jacobus Rabie and Abe Williams – became the first non-white politicians to serve in the South African cabinet, in a move viewed as an attempt by de Klerk's National Party (NP) to broaden its appeal ahead of the upcoming multiracial elections.

== Post-apartheid government ==
In the 1994 general election, South Africa's first under universal suffrage, Ranchod was elected to an NP seat in the new National Assembly. In the aftermath of the election, he was also appointed Deputy Speaker of the National Assembly as a result of an agreement between the NP and the governing African National Congress (ANC); he deputised Speaker Frene Ginwala of the ANC. The Mail & Guardian said that Ranchod was among the "verligte" (Afrikaans for enlightened, meaning progressive) ranks of the NP.

In early 1996, Ranchod announced that he would resign from the National Assembly in March to become South African High Commissioner to Australia. He apparently had not discussed the appointment with his party beforehand. He was replaced as Deputy Speaker by Baleka Mbete of the ANC.
