= Oilgate =

South African political scandal

Oilgate is a South African political scandal in which the petrol company Imvume Holdings was accused of paying R11 millions of state money to the ruling African National Congress shortly before the 2004 General Election. The money had been received from the state oil company, PetroSA, as part of an advance payment for a quantity of oil condensate that had been procured from Glencore, an international company.

The scandal broke in an article written by the newspaper Mail & Guardian. Imvume was able to get a court order restraining the Mail & Guardian from publishing the article, but was subsequently outmaneuvered when the Freedom Front Plus, an opposition political party, revealed the same information in Parliament. Under South African law, political groups making representations in parliament may not be subjected to legal action for the content of their statements. Since the information was now in the public sphere, the Mail and Guardian was able to print the article.

Over the same period, Imvume Holdings was embroiled in the United Nations (UN) Oil-for-Food scandal. Although Oilgate proper refers to the party funding scandal, it is frequently linked to the Oil-for-Food debacle: the Mail & Guardian alleged that the ANC had been a key player in the Oil-for-Food deals, thus demonstrating that close and possibly inappropriate links existed between Imvume and the ANC.

== Background ==
=== ANC links to Imvume ===
In February 2004, the Mail & Guardian reported that businessman Sandi Majali's companies, one of which was Imvume, had purchased Iraqi oil under the Oil-for-Food programme, which at the time was becoming infamous for its widespread abuse. The Mail & Guardian suggested that the Iraqi government had contracted with Majali due to his ostensible political access – for example, an ANC delegation had travelled to Baghdad with Majali to meet with Iraqi officials, presumably to broker the deal, and ANC secretary general Kgalema Motlanthe had written a letter to the Iraqi government saying that Majali had the ANC's "full approval and blessing." In 2001, Imvume won a tender worth about R1-billion to supply Iraqi crude oil to the state; which the Mail & Guardian alleged was "clearly no coincidence." The ANC ultimately admitted that it had advocated on Imvume's behalf with the Iraqi government, but said that it had been legitimate support for an emerging black economic empowerment enterprise. In October 2005, the report of the independent inquiry appointed by the UN to investigate the Oil-for-Food programme, known as the Paul Volcker Committee, found both that ANC officials had been closely involved in the deals and that Majali had paid illegal kickbacks (known as surcharges) to the Iraqi regime. The Mail & Guardian asked whether ANC officials had been aware of the kickbacks arrangement.

== ANC donation ==
Imvume Holdings later won another state tender, this time a R750-million contract to supply condensate feedstock to PetroSA, the state-owned oil and gas company. In May 2005, in another scandal, the Mail & Guardian reported that PetroSA had made an irregular payment of R15 million to Imvume, as an advance on the contract. The payment was made in December 2003, four months before the 2004 general election, and, later the same week, Imvume donated R11-million to the ANC. The Mail & Guardian suggested that the transfers were related to Imvume's links to the ANC. In July 2005, the newspaper reported on evidence that Imvume was "effectively a front" for the ANC.
