= Barry Oberholzer =

American technology entrepreneur

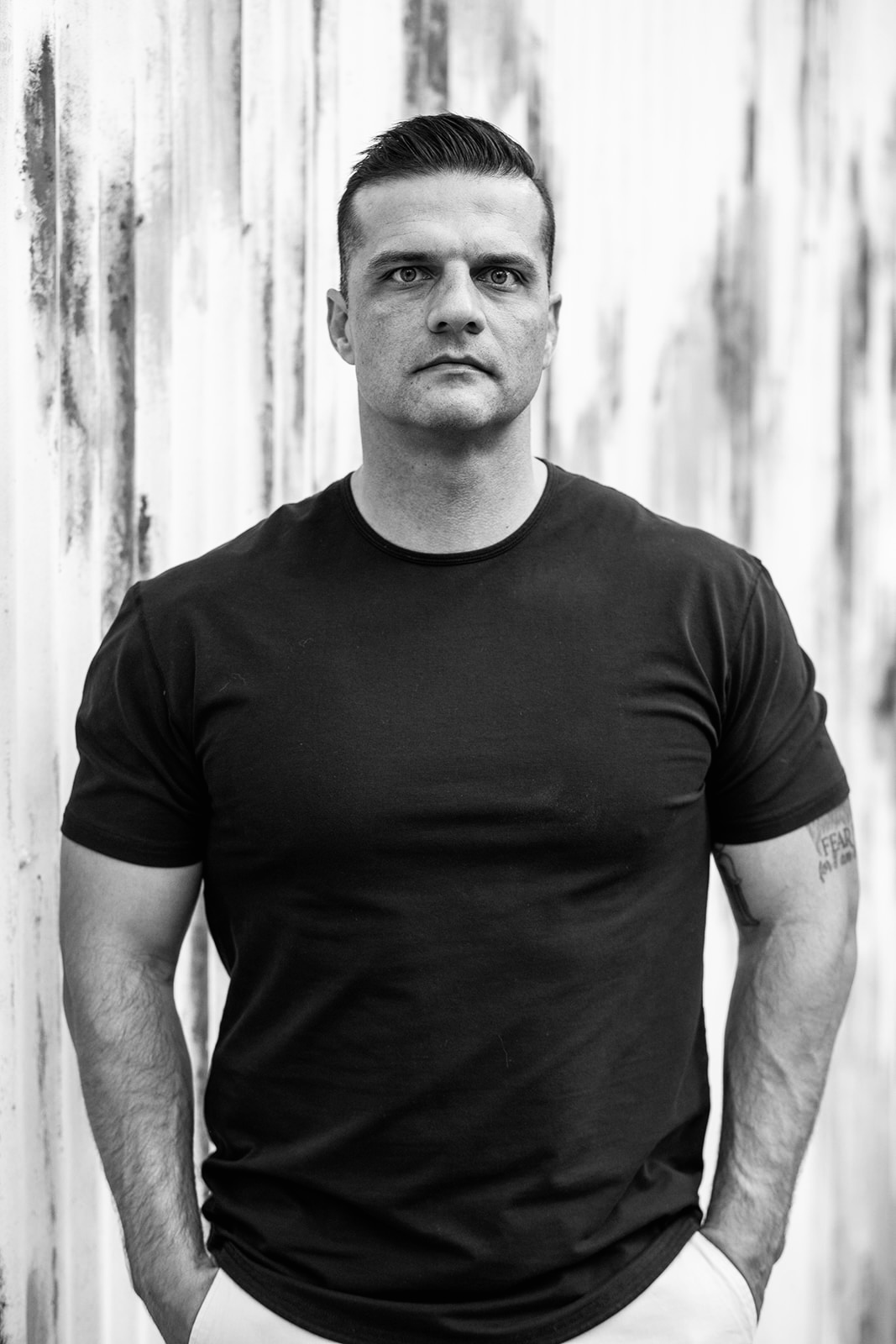
- Born: Barend Oberholzer; Houston, Texas, United States
- Education: University of South Africa, American Military University
- Occupations: Helicopter pilot, podcast host
- Years active: 2001–present

Barend Oberholzer, also known as Barry Oberholzer, is a former intelligence operative, former professional rugby player, American entrepreneur, licensed helicopter pilot, podcast host and convicted felon.

== Early life ==
Oberholzer was born in Houston, Texas, United States, where his father Barry Oberholzer Sr. served as the South African consul-general. After his father's diplomatic term ended in 1985, he relocated to South Africa.

In 2012, Oberholzer enrolled in an undergraduate program in Counter-Intelligence and Terrorism at the American Military University.

== Career ==
Oberholzer initially worked as a marketing manager for South African based helicopter company, Base4 Aviation.

Oberholzer was a former intelligence contractor, serving as an informant, for the Joint Terrorism Task Force, Department of Homeland Security, Belgium Customs Intelligence Unit and the United Kingdom’s HM Revenue & Customs Intelligence to counter criminal operations, including narco-terrorism and smuggling networks. When asked, these agencies have declined to comment, citing policy against confirming any individual's involvement as an informant.

=== Technology ===
In 2017, Oberholzer founded x.labs, a defense technology company which included SWORD, a mobile internet of things threat detection device, in an attempt to prevent casualties in mass shooting. The device was marketed as being able to "identify concealed threats, such as weapons, knives and explosive devices, and to identify people on customized watchlists." The technology was never proven to work and investors lost all of their funds.

=== Involvement with the South African and government ===
Oberholzer served as a managing director of 360 Aviation where he was accused by the South African Government of defrauding Mr Kleyn.https://d1tzzns6d79su2.cloudfront.net/uploads/011c/ab1a/chargesheet%20barry%20oberholzer%20south%20africa.pdf

In 2005, he advertised a Bell Helicopter on Barnstormers.com, an online marketplace for aviation. He was later contacted by Hussein Safari, an Iranian businessman who would help Oberholzer circumvent sanctions against Iran by selling American helicopters to Iran for a mark-up from South Africa. These deals garnered him over 3 million South African rands per transaction. Business increased in 2008 when South African President Thabo Mbeki encouraged more international trade between South Africa and Iran. 360 Aviation set up its own front company, Gemini Moon, to sell aircraft and parts, and set up other front operations for different Iranian entities.

In March 2012, Oberholzer informed the Federal Bureau of Investigation's Joint Terrorism Task Force of these activities in exchange for immunity, fearing potential jail time as an American citizen if he had gotten arrested. This information included attempts to garner governmental backing in June 2011 from the South African Deputy President Kgalema Motlanthe and his partner Gugu Mtshali in exchange for monetary compensation. Motlanthe has challenged these claims. The negotiations, that failed, would have set up a five-year contract of at least 450 million Rands for Gemini Moon to supply the National Iranian Oil Company with helicopters and parts. This would have violated the 2010 UN arms embargo.

While the United States government could not confirm nor deny Oberholzer's involvement as an intelligence operative, The Sunday Times has corroborated his statements.

=== Rugby ===
Barry Oberholzer represented the United States of America in two World Championships as a professional rugby player.

== Controversies ==
In a case filed in the Southern District of New York, Oberholzer pleaded guilty on March 27, 2023, to one count of conspiracy to commit wire fraud. The original charge of impersonating former CIA Director and retired U.S. Army General David Petraeus in emails to venture capital firms in 2018 was dropped by the U.S. Government in order to obtain the guilty plea. In January 2024, Oberholzer was sentenced to 15 months in prison and ordered to pay restitution, along with the forfeiture of $252,862.

=== Civil fraud lawsuit ===
In 2022, logistics provider Unique Logistics International (NYC), LLC filed a civil lawsuit against Oberholzer, Marcell Francois Oberholzer, and associated entities in the U.S. District Court for the Eastern District of New York. The suit alleged fraud and related claims. The parties subsequently reached a settlement in principle, leading to an affidavit of confession of judgment. The court entered a final judgment awarding $1,856,000 to Unique Logistics International, holding the defendants jointly and severally liable.

Jett LLC Fraud Warning

In 2021, international air cargo operator Network Airline Management issued a public fraud warning disclaiming any commercial association with Oberholzer and his company, Jett LLC, cautioning the public and aviation vendors against unauthorized flight contracting and fraudulent representation.<ref>{{cite press release |title=Fraudulent Representation Alert – Barry Oberholzer & Jett LLC |url=https://network-airline.com/category/news/page/4/ |publisher=Network Airline Management |date=2021 |access-date=August 1, 2026 |quote=Network Airline Management has been made aware of fraudulent activity involving Barry Oberholzer and Jett LLC... Network Airline Management has no business relationship with Barry Oberholzer or Jett LLC.}}</ref>

Philanthropy

Following the fall of Kabul in 2021, Oberholzer became involved in humanitarian and philanthropic efforts to assist Afghans affected by the crisis. He supposedly participated in organizing and supporting evacuation flights for individuals and families at risk, including former members of the Afghan Air Force. In the United States, he stated that he supported several ex-Afghan military pilots in transitioning to civilian aviation careers by facilitating employment in commercial airlines. He self stated that he also provided funding for food packages distributed to families of displaced persons in Afghanistan during the period of political and economic instability. This was coincidentally done while under investigation by Federal Authorities.

While Upperwood Foundation was presented as a charitable endeavor, it operated alongside multiple fraud investigations and legal proceedings involving Oberholzer

<ref>{{cite news |last=Scholtz |first=Hannes |title=Local fraudster now in US jail |url=https://novanews.co.za/paarlpost/local-fraudster-now-in-us-jail-20240228-2/ |work=Paarl Post / NovaNews |date=March 1, 2024 |access-date=August 1, 2026 |quote=Shortly before being arrested in 2015, Oberholzer hosted a charity function, Row for Willem, supposedly to raise funds for one Willem van der Merwe, who was ill. Oberholzer then withdrew R25 000 from the function account.}}</ref>

Books

- The Black Market Concierge: Sanction Busting, Smuggling & Spying for America, Black Box Entertainment (November 26, 2016), ASIN B01LM1YQ6E.
