= 2018 Zimbabwean uprising =

The 2018 Zimbabwean uprising was a series of protests held in 2018 against the results of the 2018 Zimbabwean general election and the regime of Emmerson Mnangagwa. Mass protests against the results of the elections, the deteriorating economic crisis and the national political crisis has also led to 2-days of pro-democracy opposition riots in Harare and other opposition strongholds nationwide. Tens of thousands took to the streets to protest the illegal falsification of the election result and hardships people are facing, and were joined by students, teachers, farmers and workers. Pro-democratic activists also led rallies nationwide in support of the demonstrators in Harare and demanded the end of the regime. Intense clashes and brutal violence ensued in a violent crackdown on protesters. The election unrest turned even deadlier after army officials opened fire on demonstrators, killing 6 and wounding 12+. Civilians were injured in the unrest and small protests were held the day after the protest movement, while 1 was shot dead.

== See also ==
- 2016-2017 Zimbabwe protests
- Zimbabwe fuel protests
