= Frene Ginwala =

South African politician (1932–2023)

- Ginwala (left) in 2017

1st Speaker of the National Assembly of South Africa
- In office 9 May 1994 – 12 July 2004
- Deputy: B.G. Ranchod (1994-1996); Baleka Mbete (1996–2004)
- Preceded by: Gene Louw (Speaker of House of Assembly)
- Succeeded by: Baleka Mbete

Chancellor of the University of KwaZulu-Natal
- In office April 2005 – September 2007
- Preceded by: Position established
- Succeeded by: Zweli Mkhize

Member of the National Assembly of South Africa
- In office 9 May 1994 – 12 July 2004
- Constituency: KwaZulu-Natal

Personal details
- Born: Frene Noshir Ginwala; 25 April 1932 Johannesburg, Transvaal Province, South Africa
- Died: 12 January 2023 (aged 90) South Africa
- Party: African National Congress
- Education: University of Oxford
- Profession: Journalist; politician; anti-apartheid activist

Frene Noshir Ginwala (25 April 1932 – 12 January 2023) was a South African journalist and politician who was the first speaker of the National Assembly of South Africa from 1994 to 2004. She was influential in the writing of the Constitution of South Africa and an important figure in establishing democracy in South Africa.

== Biography ==
Born in Johannesburg, on 25 April 1932, Ginwala was an Indian South African from the Parsi-Indian community of western India.

Ginwala has written a number of books dealing with various aspects of the struggle against injustice. For her efforts, she has been honoured by international and local institutions and governments.

Using her anonymity, she played a tremendous role in establishing underground escape routes for ANC (African National Congress) members in the period following the Sharpeville massacre and the declaration of the State of Emergency (SOE) in 1960. These included Deputy-President of the ANC Oliver Tambo and Yusuf Dadoo, two leaders of the liberation movement. She also organised safe houses for those who had to remain in the country. Ginwala also chauffeured NIC (Natal Indian Congress) leaders Monty Naicker and J. N. Singh, who were operating from the underground after managing to dodge the police swoop. Their instructions were to travel around the province and raise money from secret donors in order to support the families left destitute through the arrest of their breadwinners under the SOE which hung over the country for five months.

Eventually she had to leave South Africa in the latter part of 1960 and together with Tambo, and Dadoo, they established an exile ANC office in Dar es Salaam, Tanganyika which was still under British Colonial Administration until 9 December 1961. The overthrow of the Sultanate of Zanzibar in January 1964 paved the way for the formation of the United Republic of Tanzania in 1964. Apart from the ANC, she threw herself in a very broad field of activities. She gave lectures to trainee diplomats at Oxford University where she studied for her PhD, she also wrote for a number of the established media outlets in the UK and elsewhere including the BBC. Frene Ginwala was instrumental in establishing a communications system in the newly established United Republic of Tanzania. At the request of President Julius Nyerere, she became the managing editor of the English-speaking daily newspaper Standard, and Sunday News. During the entire period of her exile (she returned to South Africa in 1991) she traversed the world preaching the horrors of apartheid and the fight against it. Ginwala held academic titles from several universities in Africa and abroad. She was a barrister at law; historian; a political scientist, and held a doctorate in philosophy from Linacre College at Oxford University.

In the first democratic South African elections in 1994, Frene Ginwala was elected to the Parliament of South Africa. She was nominated by the ANC caucus and elected by parliament as the Speaker of the National Assembly of South Africa, a position she held from 1994 until 2004.

After retirement as speaker, she continued serving in a number of international organisations including UN subsidiaries, as Trustee of the Nelson Mandela Foundation and as Chancellor of the University of KwaZulu-Natal. Ginwala was appointed the first chancellor of the University of KwaZulu-Natal in April 2005. At the time, she was one of only four female university chancellors in South Africa.

South African president Thabo Mbeki appointed Ginwala on 30 September 2007 to conduct the enquiry into National Director of Public Prosecutions Vusi Pikoli's fitness to hold office. She decided generally in favour of Pikoli, but criticised poor communication between departments. She also criticised the Director General of the Department of Justice and Constitutional Development, Advocate Menzi Simelane, whose testimony was contradictory, and without basis in fact or Law. She also had harsh words for president Jacob Zuma on his subsequent appointment of Simelane to National Director of Public Prosecutions.

Ginwala died from complications of a stroke suffered two weeks earlier on 12 January 2023, at the age of 90.

== Honours ==
- 2003: North-South Prize
- 2005: Order of Luthuli, in silver
- 2008: Order of the Rising Sun, 2008
