= Joe Seremane =

South African politician (born 1938)

Wetshotsile Joseph Seremane
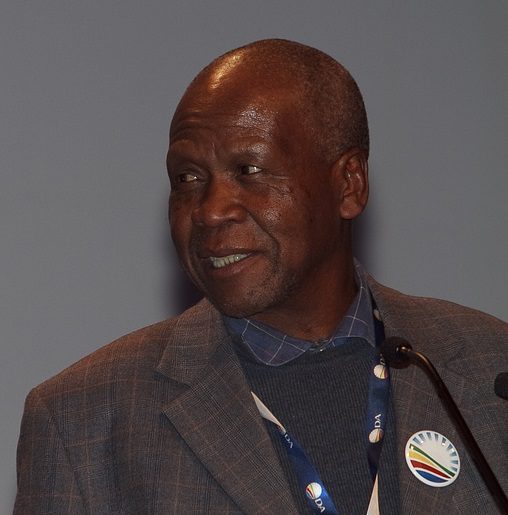

Federal Chairperson of the Democratic Alliance
- In office March 2000 (as chairperson of the Democratic Party) – 2010
- Preceded by: Douglas Gibson
- Succeeded by: Wilmot James

Member of Parliament
- In office 1998–2009
- Constituency: North West

Personal details
- Born: 26 August 1938 (age 87) Randfontein, Transvaal (now Gauteng), South Africa
- Party: Democratic Alliance (2000-present)
- Other political affiliations: Democratic Party (1994-2000); Pan Africanist Congress of Azania (until 1994)
- Spouse: 1 (late)
- Children: 4

Wetshotsile Joseph Seremane (born 26 August 1938) is a former South African politician and federal chairperson of the country's main opposition party, the Democratic Alliance (DA).

Seremane started his career as a school teacher in Bekkersdal in the Gauteng province of South Africa, until he was barred from teaching due to his involvement in politics. He was a political prisoner on Robben Island from 1963 to 1969, before being deported by the apartheid government to the then black homeland of Bophuthatswana. He was further detained without trial from 1976 to 1978, and several times between 1982 and 1984.

He has served civic organisations in advocacy and later, mediation and conflict resolution. He was the Director of Justice and Reconciliation for the South African Council of Churches, and Chief Land Claims Commissioner after the 1994 advent of democracy in the country.

In 1994 he joined the Democratic Party (DP), the predecessor to the DA and was elected Member of Parliament in 1998. In March 2000 he was elected federal chairperson of the DP, and subsequently became the founding chairperson of the DA.

Initially a member of the Pan Africanist Congress of Azania (PAC), a radical black consciousness movement, Seremane now rejects the politics of race and was long seen as the most prominent black figure in the multi-racial DA.

After the announcement of the former DA leader Tony Leon that he intended to retire in May 2007, Seremane was regarded as a possible candidate to succeed Leon.

On 26 February 2007 he announced that he would stand for election as leader for the DA. He together with Athol Trollip were, however, defeated by Helen Zille on 6 May 2007.

Seremane was the DA's candidate for president in the parliamentary 25 September 2008 vote to elect a successor to Thabo Mbeki.

He retired in 2010, and was replaced as DA federal chairperson by Wilmot James.
