= Imvume =

Imvume Holdings is a South African oil company. In 2005 it was involved in what the South African press dubbed the Oilgate scandal.

In 2004, the South African newspaper Mail & Guardian revealed Imvume's implication in the United Nations Oil-for-Food scandal. Imvume was named as one of the companies that paid kickbacks to Iraq in exchange for a contract under the oil for food program. Imvume subsequently took legal action against the Independent Inquiry Committee, the UN body that made the accusations.

== See also ==
- Chancellor House Holdings
