= South African Arms Deal =

Defence procurement programme

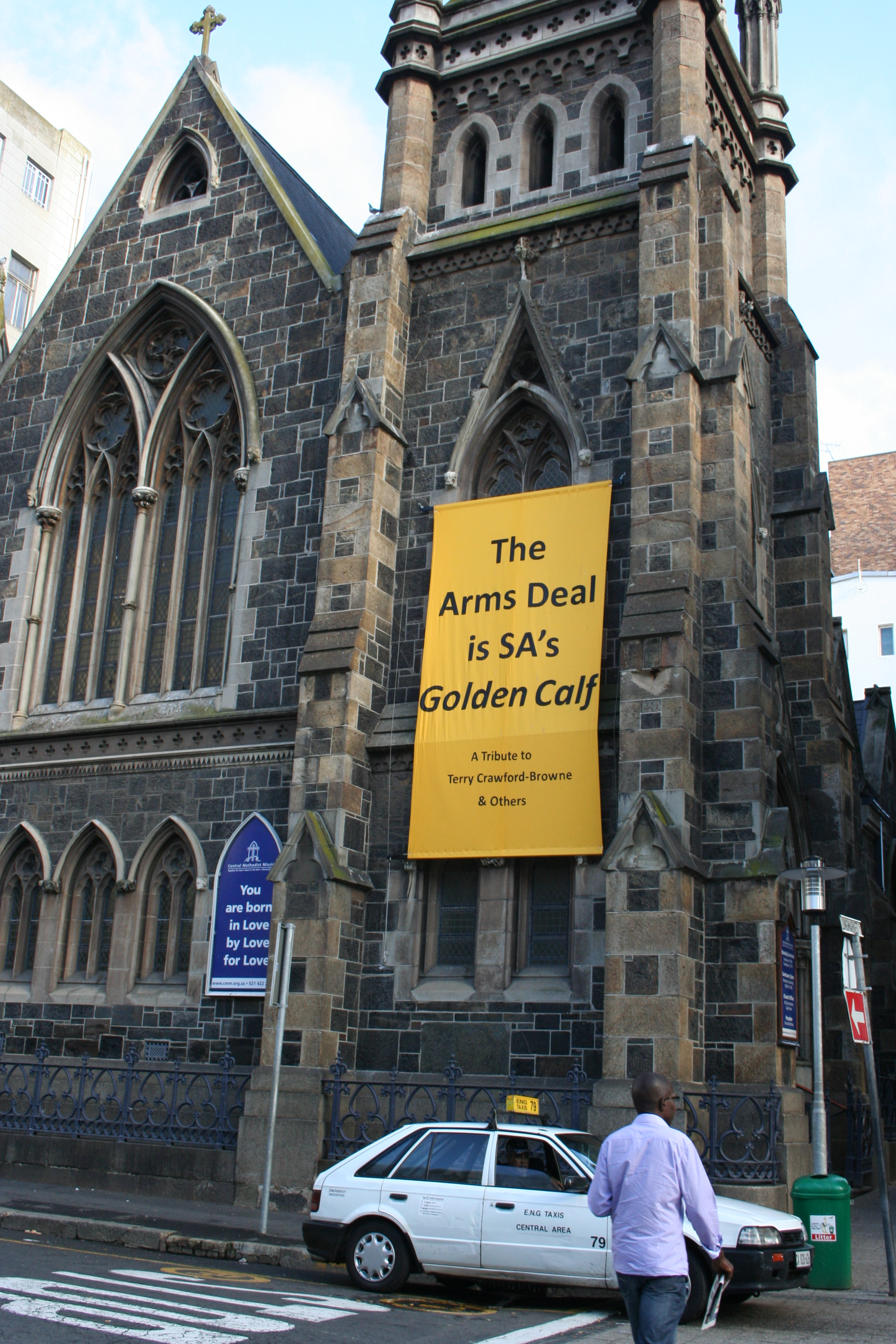
A critical banner on the Central Methodist Mission in Cape Town compares the Arms Deal to a golden calf.

The Strategic Defence Package, popularly known as the Arms Deal, was a major defence procurement programme undertaken to re-equip the South African armed forces for the post-apartheid era. It is commonly associated with the large-scale corruption that is alleged to have taken place during and after the procurement process. Some critics have said that the Arms Deal was a defining moment or turning point for the African National Congress (ANC) government, less than five years into its tenure.

Following decades of sanctions and a major review of its functions and strategy, the Department of Defence sought to modernise its defence equipment and prepare to participate in a broader range of peace-keeping, defensive, and possibly offensive operations outside South Africa's borders. In 1998, Parliament and the cabinet of President Nelson Mandela, both dominated by the ANC, approved a Defence Review Report which entailed large scale procurement of defence equipment. In December 1999, the government signed contracts with European countries for the procurement of corvettes, submarines, trainer aircraft, fighter aircraft, and helicopters worth about R30 billion, primarily for the use of the South African Navy and South African Air Force. Because of the financing arrangements and exchange rate fluctuations, the true cost of the contracts – only finally paid off in October 2020 – is estimated at far more, although the government's total expenditure on the package has never been disclosed.

From the outset, the Arms Deal was criticised on multiple fronts. Some critics questioned the justifiability of the scale and cost of the package, while others questioned the strategic usefulness or prudence of specific contracts under the package. Most public attention, however, was focused on allegations that improper procurement processes had been followed. Each of the five major programmes of the package ultimately became subject to such allegations, which often extended to allegations of profiteering by ANC politicians, including through fraud, corruption, bribery, racketeering and/or money laundering. At least three former cabinet ministers – Joe Modise, Siphiwe Nyanda, and Stella Sigcau – and two former Presidents – Thabo Mbeki and Jacob Zuma – have been accused of improperly benefiting from the contracts. Few of the allegations have been proven or prosecuted, and most were dismissed by the Seriti Commission, a judicial inquiry which ran from 2011 to 2016 and whose findings were overturned in 2019. The only individuals convicted on charges relating to the deal were former ANC Chief Whip Tony Yengeni and Zuma's financial advisor Schabir Shaik, although a criminal case is ongoing against Zuma and one of the Arms Deal subcontractors, Thales.

== Background ==
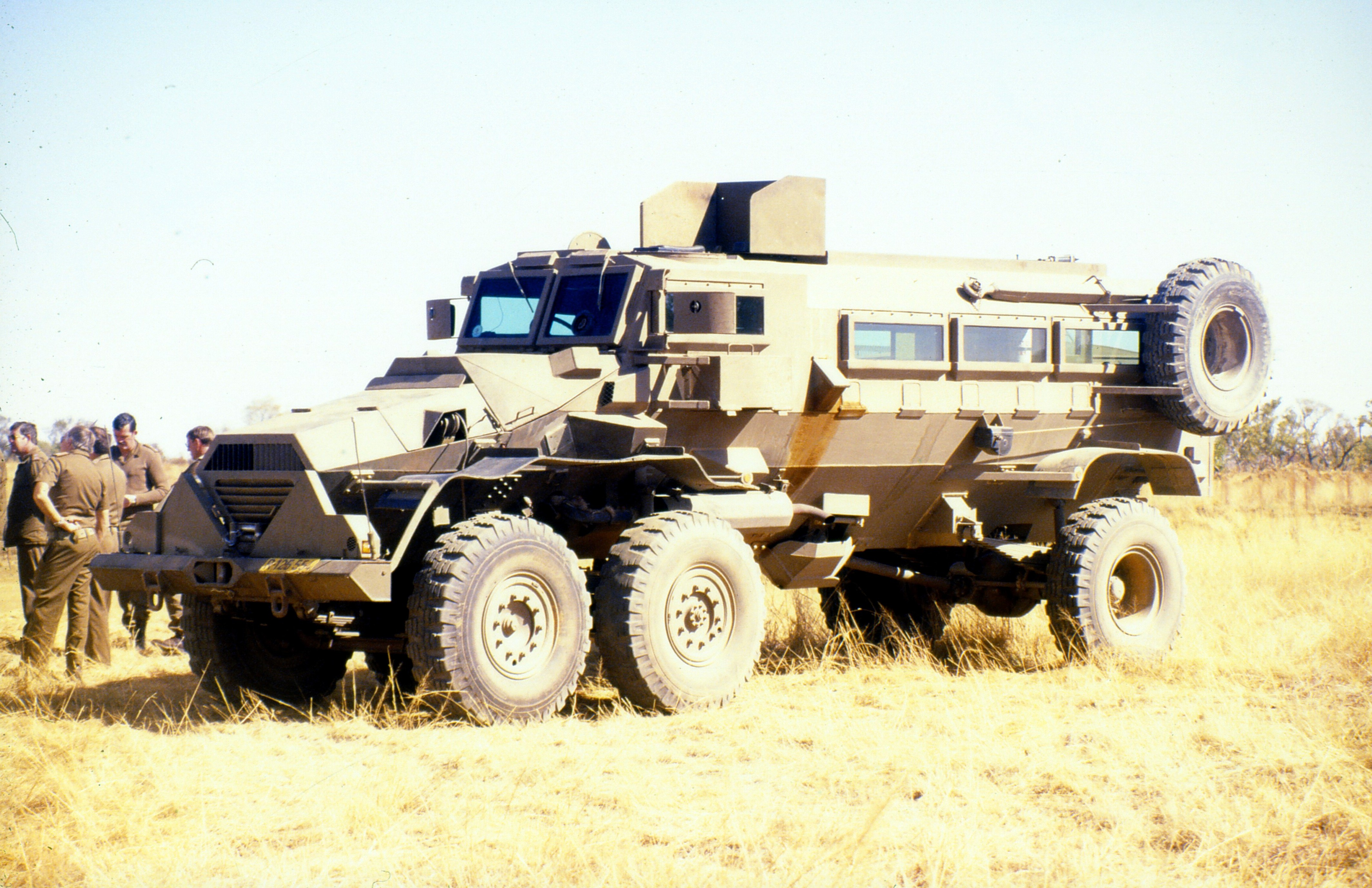
The apartheid-era military was symbolised by the Casspir, often deployed in townships to quell unrest.

=== Strategic review ===
After the end of apartheid in 1994, the South African National Defence Force (SANDF) replaced the apartheid-era South African Defence Force (SADF). Much of the country's defence equipment would reportedly face block obsolescence before the end of the decade, and, in previous years, the South African Navy had reportedly already lost a significant portion of its conventional capacities. Sanctions, and eventually a United Nations arms embargo, applied on exports to South Africa had meant that the apartheid government relied heavily on the domestic arms industry, primarily through the state-owned Armscor. However, with the end of the Cold War and of various regional conflicts, the defence budget fell substantially after 1989, forcing reductions to capital expenditure on defence.

After 1994, major defence acquisitions were treated not as merely technical decisions but as political and economic decisions, subject to Cabinet and parliamentary approval as well as to approval by three separate bodies within the Department of Defence. The first post-apartheid Minister of Defence, Joe Modise, requested parliamentary approval for the acquisition of Spanish corvettes as early as 1994, but this was refused pending a threat assessment and strategic review of the country's broad military arrangements. Accordingly, the Ministry of Defence initiated a consultative process to establish the future outlook of SANDF. This process of public participation – also subject to the approval of Parliament and Cabinet – culminated in a White Paper on Defence in 1996, a Defence Review Report in 1998, and a White Paper on Defence-Related Industries in 1999.

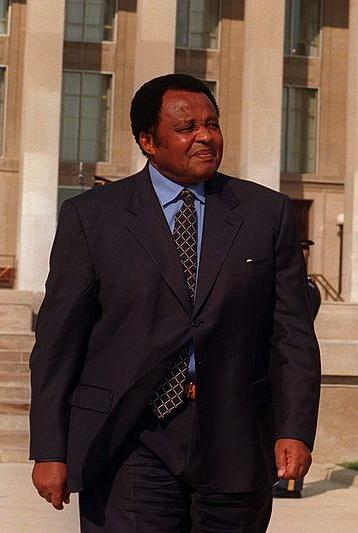
The Arms Deal was initiated while Joe Modise was Defence Minister.

The 1996 White Paper and 1998 Defence Review agreed, in line with the Constitution, that SANDF's primary function was to defend the territorial integrity and people of South Africa – in contrast to the posture of SADF, which towards the end of apartheid had been involved in internal political conflicts. Both reports also agreed that SANDF should adopt a "strategic defensive posture." However, whereas the 1996 White Paper emphasised a wide definition of "security," acknowledging that South African security was not primarily a matter of military strength and that there were no immediate military threats to the country, the 1998 Defence Review also included a commitment to enhance the ability of SANDF to mount offensive operations using conventional forces if required. Thus, of the four options devised, Parliament and the Cabinet approved the approach which would reduce SANDF's manpower but increase its capital intensity, entailing a major programme of defence procurement to update SANDF's ageing equipment. The Defence Review was approved with the caveat that all procurement would require separate parliamentary approval, but that condition was ultimately not met – in December 1999, the final Strategic Defence Package was merely presented to Parliament.

=== Procurement process ===
In announcing its plans for defence procurement, the government emphasised the extent of the offset offers that it had received from multiple foreign suppliers from an early phase, presenting offsets as an opportunity to spur investment, industrialisation, job creation (the final package was expected to create 61,629 jobs), and economic growth. However, the Congress of South African Trade Unions expressed concern. According to journalist R. W. Johnson, the deal was also opposed, primarily on financial grounds, by Ministers Trevor Manuel, Joe Slovo, and Jay Naidoo, while Deputy President Thabo Mbeki, who has been described as a "champion" of the deal, supported Modise in favour of it.

The basis for the process of deciding between bids was an evaluation by four committees (technical, finance merit, defence industrial participation, and national industrial participation), who scored each out of 300. Those evaluations were then forwarded across a series of other bodies, primarily within the defence establishment and of increasing seniority, each of which made recommendations to the next level, ultimately culminating in a set of recommendations to Cabinet. On 18 November 1998, the Cabinet approved the department's recommendations of preferred suppliers for the armaments packages, at an estimated cost of roughly R29.77 billion. This was not a final decision to procure at the estimated cost, but a decision to proceed with negotiations with those suppliers. On 15 September 1999, the Cabinet approved the acquisition of the final packages, and contracts were signed with the relevant companies on 3 December 1999.

== Final package ==
=== Procurement ===
The cabinet announced that the total cost of the package was R29.992 billion, and it comprised:

Procurements under the Strategic Defence Package
Programme	Country	Supplier	Product	Quantity	Value
Corvette	Germany	Blohm + Voss Howaldtswerke-Deutsche Werft Thyssen Rheinstahl Technik	GFC Meko A200	4	R5.473 bn
Submarine	Germany	Ferrostaal	GSC 209/1400 MOD	3	R4.289 bn
Light utility helicopter	Italy	Agusta	A109	30	R1.532 bn
Lead-in fighter trainer aircraft	United Kingdom	BAE Systems	Hawk	24	R9.952 bn
Advanced light fighter aircraft	United KingdomSweden	BAE Systems Saab	JAS 39 Gripen	28	R3.728 bn

The costs cited in the table above, which were announced by the Cabinet at the time of the signature of the contracts, exclude finance charges, escalation clauses, and foreign exchange fluctuations. Thus the R29.992 billion figure should not be taken as representative of the actual cost of the contracts over the term of their payment. The actual cost has been estimated at R90 billion by 2008, and at R142.864 billion by the time the package was paid off in 2020 (in 2020 prices). The government has not disclosed the total amount that it spent on the package. In July 2016, News24 reported on invoices it claimed had been sent to Armscor by the arms companies and leaked by Anonymous; however, Armscor said that the leaked figures were inaccurate. On the other hand, the contracts also purportedly entailed offsets of R100 billion.

Four Super Lynx 300, supplied by the United Kingdom, had also been on the 1998 list of preferred programmes, but fell out of the final package. However, the department separately purchased them in 2003. This contract can be seen as an indirect result of the original package – by purchasing the corvettes, the government effectively committed to purchase maritime helicopters in the future. The Super Lynx were deployed on the new German corvettes from 2008.

=== Financing ===
The defence companies who supplied the equipment were paid between 2000 and 2014, while the South African government (through the National Treasury as debtor) continued paying off related loans until October 2020. The major financiers of the package, some of whose loans were underwritten by their governments, were the following international banks (with amounts provided by Manuel, who was the Minister of Finance at the time):

Loans used to finance the Strategic Defence Package
Lender	Country	Programme	Value
Barclays	United Kingdom	Aircraft	$2.5 bn
Commerzbank	Germany	Corvettes and submarines	€1.058 bn
Société Générale	France	Corvette combat suite	€188.06 mn
MedioCredito Centrale	Italy	Helicopters	$199.79 mn

== Strategic criticisms ==
The Arms Deal was subject to criticism on several different fronts. Although the majority of the ensuing controversy centred on corruption allegations and concerns that fair procurement processes had not been followed, the deal was also criticised from an early stage on grounds relating to its cost and underlying strategy. For example, critics point to the Affordability Report published by the Treasury in August 1999, which found that the Arms Deal presented a sizeable economic risk. They say that the scale of the acquisitions was hard to justify, given that South Africa did not face any direct military threats.

Even when the need for such a large-scale defence acquisitions package is acknowledged, some have questioned whether the right equipment and the right suppliers were selected. For example, the decision to acquire submarines and fighter aircraft appeared imprudent to those who believed that SANDF's primary role would be to conduct peace-keeping operations and police support operations, neither of which would require additional conventional military capabilities. The most immediate maritime threats were those of smuggling and illegal fishing from foreign trawlers, making the acquisition of four modern German submarines appear ill-judged. Similarly, the southern African airspace was generally entirely peaceful, and the Air Force already possessed highly capable Cheetahs. The BAE Hawk trainer aircraft also cost twice as much as the Italian alternative, which was preferred by the Air Force itself.

Although the Seriti Commission found otherwise, it has also been claimed that the offsets included in the final contracts failed to materialise or brought less benefit than promised.

== Corruption probes ==
=== De Lille dossier ===
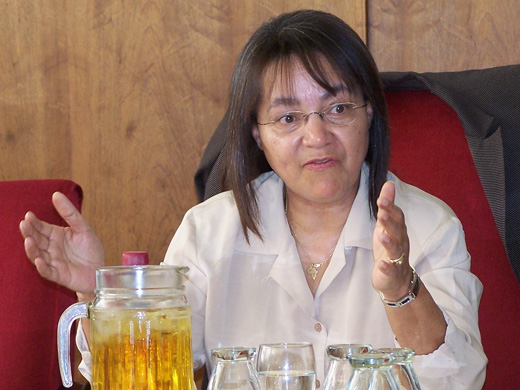
Patricia de Lille's allegations of Arms Deal misconduct caused a scandal in 1999.

Opposition parties, civil society, and independent government watchdogs were alert for potential corruption in the Arms Deal from its initiation. In November 1998, soon after the Defence Review was finalised, the Auditor-General identified the Strategic Defence Package as high-risk and sought permission to perform a special review of the procurement process, outside the regular auditing process. Then, in 1999, the Chief Whip of the Pan Africanist Congress, Patricia De Lille, addressed Parliament with allegations of corruption during the Arms Deal. The document from which she read became infamous as the "De Lille dossier," and contained allegations against Tony Yengeni, Schabir Shaik, Thabo Mbeki, and Jacob Zuma, amongst others.

De Lille became a leader in calls for an independent inquiry into the Arms Deal, which she said should be chaired former judge Willem Heath of the Special Investigating Unit. She also laid criminal charges against South Africans who had allegedly received discounted vehicles from Daimler-Benz Aerospace. In 2012, she handed the original dossier over to the Seriti Commission, with the caveat that she would not reveal her sources. Another Arms Deal activist, Terry Crawford-Browne, later alleged that the dossier had been compiled by ANC intelligence operatives working with whistleblowers inside the party, including Winnie Madikizela-Mandela.

=== 2001 joint investigation ===
In September 2000, the Auditor-General reported to Parliament's Standing Committee on Public Accounts (SCOPA) about various potential irregularities in the decision-making process uncovered during its special review. In response, SCOPA recommended that a comprehensive investigation of the package should be undertaken by four investigating bodies: the Auditor-General, the Public Protector, the Scorpions unit under the National Director of Public Prosecutions, and the Special Investigating Unit. The full Parliament endorsed the recommendation and three of the bodies were appointed, though, controversially, President Thabo Mbeki declined to appoint the Special Investigating Unit, whose scope was determined by presidential proclamation.

The three bodies conducted a joint investigation, coordinated by the Auditor-General. There were concerns that the ANC was intentionally trying to "dampen" the investigation. In August 2001, Andrew Feinstein, an ANC member of SCOPA, resigned in protest against the handling of the investigation by the government and by the ANC parliamentary caucus. Gavin Woods resigned as SCOPA Chairperson the following year, due to what he said was interference in SCOPA's work by ANC politicians. The joint report of the investigation was submitted to Parliament in November 2001, and its overall conclusion was largely exculpatory:

Whilst there may have been individuals and institutions who used or attempted to use their positions improperly... to obtain undue benefits in relation to these packages, up until now no evidence has emerged, to suggest that these activities affected the selection of the successful contractors/bidders, which may render the contracts questionable. As matters stand, there are presently no grounds to suggest that the Government's contracting position is flawed.

The Guardian called the report "heavily sanitised," Feinstein said that it was "weak and incomplete" and "watered down," and other critics considered it "a whitewash." It declined to publicly disclose findings "of a criminal and sensitive nature," but noted that the investigators had heard some allegations of corruption and conflict of interest which "appeared to have substance and are currently being pursued." These investigations presumably led to the only two convictions ever secured in relation to the Arms Deal, those of Yengeni (convicted in 2003) and Schabir Shaik (convicted in 2005), both of whom were being investigated by the Scorpions at the time of the report's publication.

=== Seriti Commission ===
Commission of Inquiry into Allegations of Fraud, Corruption, Impropriety or Irregularity in the Strategic Defence Procurement Package
- Date: 2011–2016
- Also known as: Arms Deal Commission; Seriti Commission
- Budget: R137 million
- Commissioners: Willie Seriti (chairperson); Hendrick Musi
- Status: Findings overturned in 2019

There were occasional renewed calls for investigations after further revelations or allegations were revealed in the press in subsequent years. In October 2011, President Jacob Zuma, Mbeki's successor, appointed a judicial commission of inquiry to investigate the Arms Deal, chaired by Willie Seriti and also including Willem van der Merwe and Francis Legodi. Van der Merwe resigned shortly afterwards for personal reasons and was replaced by Hendrick Musi. Formally named the Commission of Inquiry into Allegations of Fraud, Corruption, Impropriety or Irregularity in the Strategic Defence Procurement Package, it was better known as the Arms Deal Commission or the Seriti Commission. Under its terms of reference, the inquiry looked into:

- The rationale for the package;
- Whether the equipment acquired under the package was utilised;
- Whether the anticipated job opportunities and offsets had materialised;
- Whether any persons improperly influenced the award of the contracts, and, if so, whether there was a basis to pursue legal proceedings or recovery of state losses; and
- Whether any contract was "tainted by any fraud or corruption capable of proof, such as to justify its cancellation."

==== Findings ====
The inquiry ran until 2016 and cost R137 million. Several employees of the commission, including commissioner Lekgodi, resigned before or during the hearings, with some speaking publicly in protest of the commission's approach to its task; and the commission declined to admit several pieces of evidence which critics said were key. The report of the inquiry was released in April 2016 and was widely criticised as a whitewash. It found that:

- The Arms Deal package had been necessary to enable SANDF to fulfil its constitutional mandate and international obligations;
- All the equipment acquired under the package was "adequately utilised";
- The package created or "retained" at least 63,352 "direct and indirect" jobs, exceeding the projected estimate;
- The anticipated offsets had "substantially materialised," and adequate arrangements were in place to pursue outstanding offset obligations;
- There was no evidence to "suggest that any undue or improper influence played any role" in the appointment of the contractors; and
- There was no evidence to corroborate the "various allegations of fraud, corruption or malfeasance" in the Arms Deal.

The commission called accusations of fraud, corruption and malfeasance "wild allegations with no factual basis." It found no evidence that large payments to politically connected consultants were for bribes or for any purpose other than consultancy services, and it found no reason to discredit the evidence given by implicated officials who denied corruption allegations against them. It made no recommendations for further investigations or criminal charges.

==== Court challenges ====
In August 2019, the North Gauteng High Court set aside the commission's findings, on the basis that it had omitted to admit, interrogate and pursue relevant evidence and thus had failed to comprehensively investigate the matters set out in its terms of reference. The ruling was a result of a review application by Corruption Watch and Right2Know, which was unopposed after the President and three ministers withdrew their opposition to the challenge before the hearings began.

In 2021, a complaint by activist groups about the conduct at the commission of its two members, Seriti and Musi, was referred to the Judicial Conduct Committee (JCC) of the Judicial Service Commission (JSC). Ahead of the JCC hearings, Seriti and Musi submitted a court application to halt the process, challenging the constitutionality of the provision of the JSC Act which allows misconduct proceedings against retired judges, such as themselves. In November 2021, more than two years after the initial judgement, they applied to appeal the High Court's decision to overturn the commission's findings, saying that the judgement was being "used as a whip to harass us."

== Specific allegations ==
It's just a figment of the imagination because honourable members have not paid attention to what benefits have been brought by the arms deal in terms of the industry and the country. Again, they would be imagining it. I know that they have been chasing to find something. Up to this day, nobody has found anything. They've been chasing it in the sea, in the sky and everywhere. Nothing has been found. What is the problem?

— Jacob Zuma to Parliament on Arms Deal corruption in 2004

Corruption Watch alleges that there were four common types of corrupt practice related to the Arms Deal: bribery, especially through consultancy contracts; gift-giving; share transactions which allowed politicians or politically connected businessmen to benefit from the contracts; and revolving door corruption, whereby government officials involved in the deal were later employed by the contractors. Although there have been very many public allegations about specific cases or relationships involving some such corruption, they have most frequently been limited to media reports – they have very rarely been corroborated by an official investigation or inquiry or tested in a criminal trial.

=== Daimler-Benz ===
==== Tony Yengeni ====
In October 2001, the Scorpions charged ANC Chief Whip Tony Yengeni with corruption (and later also with fraud), after having investigated him for several months. He was accused of having received a 47% discount on a Mercedes-Benz from the South African branch of Daimler-Benz Aerospace, later merged into European Aeronautic Defence and Space (EADS), in exchange for offering to lobby for the awarding of contracts to Daimler-Benz for helicopters, fighter aircraft, and other products. This allegedly occurred in 1998, while Yengeni chaired Parliament's joint standing committee on defence, and a company in which EADS had a 33% stake ultimately won the contract to supply radar technology for the corvettes. Even before the charges against Yengeni were laid, EADS admitted that, through price discounts and other "assistance," it had delivered luxury cars to about thirty government officials while bidding for the Arms Deal contracts: it also supplied cars to Yengeni's wife, Lumka, and to Mandla Msomi, the chairperson of Parliament's public enterprises committee. The regional EADS head, Michael Woerfel, was charged for having facilitated the deal with Yengeni.

After years of insisting on his innocence, in February 2003 Yengeni pleaded guilty to fraud in a plea bargain under which he was acquitted of corruption. The charges against Woerfel were dropped, and Yengeni was sentenced to five years' imprisonment but released on a presidential pardon after serving only four months. Some viewed Yengeni as a scapegoat.

=== BAE Systems ===
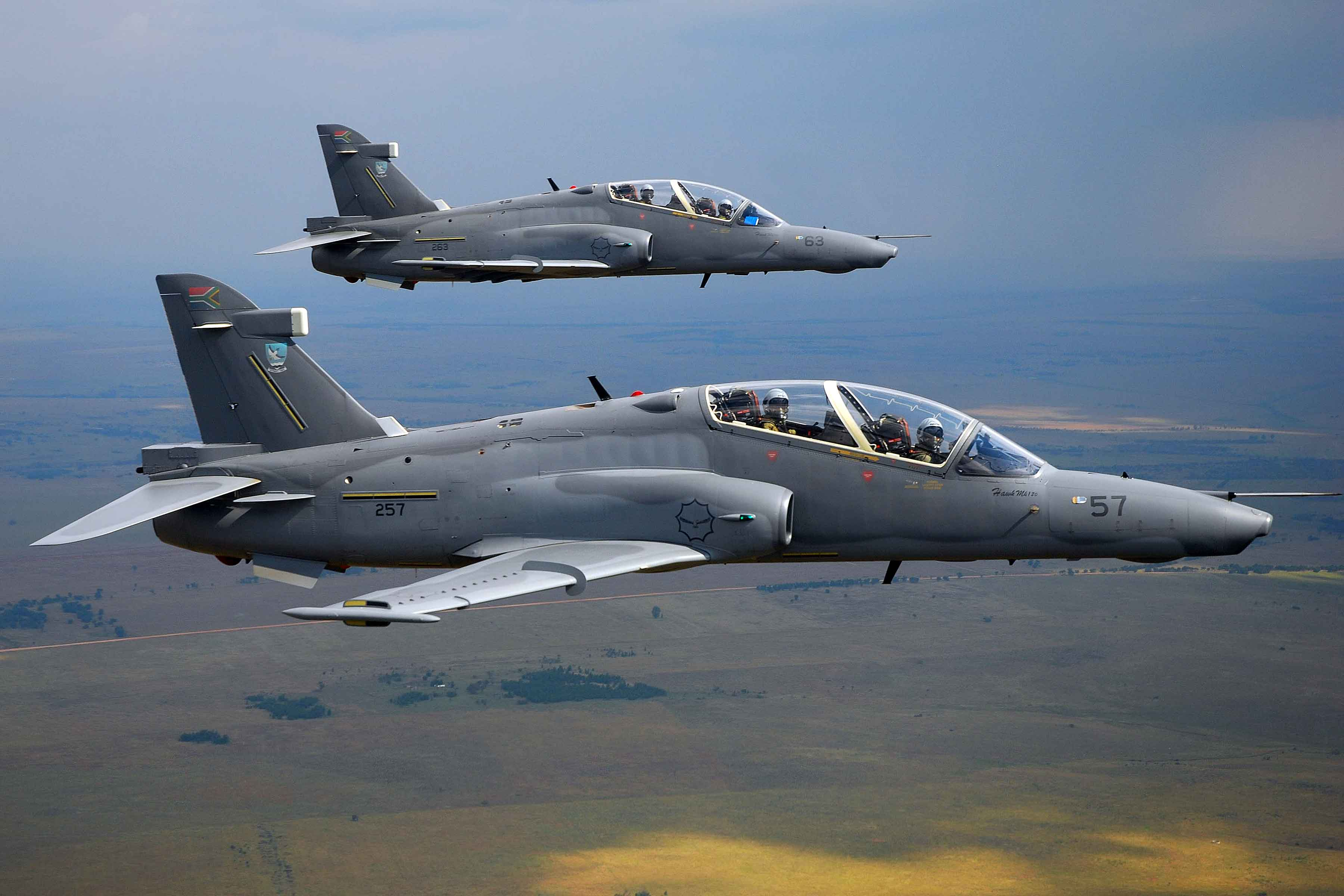
Two South African BAE Hawks conduct a security simulation for the 2010 Soccer World Cup.

British company BAE Systems received the largest contracts in the Arms Deal, having been contracted to supply Hawk aircraft and with Saab to jointly supply Gripen aircraft. From January 2007, South African authorities provided assistance to Britain's Serious Fraud Office (SFO), which since 2005 had been investigating BAE's involvement in corruption worldwide. The SFO found that BAE had paid £115 million (or R1.2 billion) in commissions to several advisors (through at least eight different entities, primarily with offshore bank accounts) to help secure the Arms Deal contracts. The SFO viewed the "commissions" as suspected bribes, although BAE denied that it paid bribes. The SFO's evidence was used by South African authorities to intensify their own investigations, and, in November 2008, not long before the unit was dissolved, the Scorpions raided properties belonging to BAE South Africa and to multiple BAE consultants.

Businessmen Fana Hlongwane and John Bredenkamp were the two major beneficiaries of the advisory contracts. Hlongwane was a former Umkhonto weSizwe commander, an advisor to Modise at the time of the Arms Deal, and a Denel director from 1999. BAE ultimately paid Hlongwane over R100 million through various means, according to the SFO for corrupt ends. The Scorpions agreed that there was "at the very least a reasonable suspicion that Fana Hlongwane may have used some of the huge sums of money he received, either directly or through the various entities which he controlled, to induce and/or reward... assistance" of officials involved in the evaluation of the Arms Deal bids. The payments to Hlongwane included quarterly retainers from BAE and from Sanip (a South African subsidiary of Saab, which in turn was majority-owned by BAE until 2005); and a large bonus from Sanip contingent upon the government making certain decisions in relation to the contracts. The contracts particularly related to assistance in respect of BAE and SAAB's offset obligations. In 2011, a Swedish documentary found evidence that SANIP was unable to prove that Hlongwane had done any "meaningful work" under his contract with Sanip, which the Daily Maverick said suggested that the advisory contract was "merely a cover" for the payments.

Similarly, Kayswell Services, which was 60% owned by Bredenkamp, entered into consultancy agreements with BAE as early as 1994. Kayswell was ultimately paid about R400 million, but BAE was allegedly unable to prove that Kayswell had actually completed any work for it. A former regional managing director of BAE admitted to the SFO that Bredenkamp had been paid for his political connections, including his access to Chief of Acquisitions Chippy Shaik. Another beneficiary of the consultancy contracts was Basil Hersov, former FNB and Anglovaal chairperson and a member of the President's economic advisory panel, whose company FTNSA Consulting had allegedly received £5.5 million (R77 million). Hersov later said that it had been less than that amount, and that it had been properly disclosed to the South African authorities.

BAE reached an overall settlement with the SFO in February 2010. During the same period, it also settled with the United States Department of Justice and Department of State. All three settlements were broad, relating to BAE's activities in a number of countries other than South Africa, and none involved admitting to bribery or corruption, although BAE did admit that it had used commissions to "ensure BAE was favoured in foreign government decisions regarding the sale of defence articles."

==== Joe Modise ====
Defence Minister Joe Modise has also been implicated in corruption relating to the BAE contracts, in ways more direct than his relationship with Hlongwane. In 2003, the Guardian published allegations by an ANC politician who claimed that Defence Minister Modise was bribed £500,000, and that money was also paid to the ANC for its 1999 election campaign. BAE denied that it had paid bribes. It was also alleged that Aermacchi, an Italian bidder for the aircraft contracts, had been told that it had to subcontract a front company owned by associates of Modise in order to win the tender. The Guardian said that there was evidence that Modise had intervened to prevent Aermacchi from being selected, and the 2001 joint investigation found that Modise had instructed that cost should not be the only criterion considered when choosing a supplier for the lift aircraft, which ultimately went to BAE at a much higher price than that offered by Aermacchi. Pierre Steyn has since said that he resigned as Secretary of Defence in 1998 over the deal, feeling that Modise had made up his mind in advance as to the outcome of the tender process. The Guardian also said that the offsets promised under the BAE contract would have benefitted Conlog, a company in which Modise owned shares, although BAE ultimately did not invest in Conlog. This was described as a blatant undeclared conflict of interest. The joint investigation noted this and said that, although it had not found yet found any evidence of impropriety, "such a situation seems extremely undesirable as it creates negative public perception." Modise died before the investigation could be completed, in the same month that the report of the joint investigation was released, and it was not pursued further.

==== Siphiwe Nyanda ====
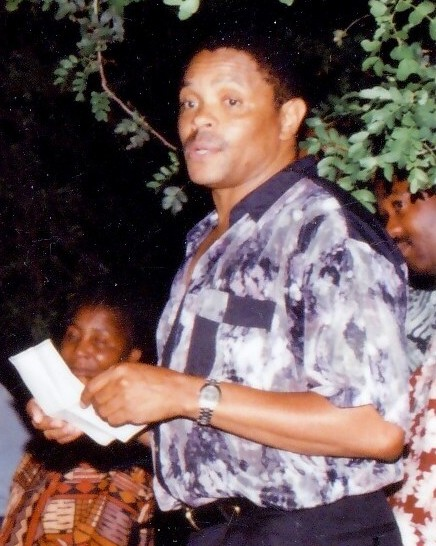
Ex-SANDF Chief Siphiwe Nyanda was accused of a conflict of interest.

In 2010, amaBhungane reported that Siphiwe Nyanda, the SANDF Chief between 1998 and mid-2005, had received a R4.36-million loan from Ngwane Aerospace, the company through which Hlongwane received the Sanip consultancy fees between July 2004 and August 2006. The loan, granted in 2005, was primarily for the purchase of a new house in Bryanston. Nyanda and Hlongwane had a relationship dating back to the apartheid era. Both parties denied that the loan constituted a bribe or was otherwise illicit.

In 2020, the Daily Maverick said that the loan had been written off in 2009 "with evidence that there was little to no attempt at repayment." In response, Nyanda granted the newspaper access to private documents which showed that he had repaid the loan. However, the documents gave rise to two new revelations. First, the documents reportedly showed that Nyanda had agreed to loans from Hlongwane's companies before his retirement from SANDF. Second, they reportedly showed that from 2007 Nyanda had paid off the Ngwane Aerospace loan with his salary from Ngwane Defence Group, which was founded in 2006 and was also part-owned by Hlongwane. Nyanda had been appointed chief executive officer at Ngwane Defence after his retirement from SANDF, and he asked the company to transfer his salary directly to Ngwane Aerospace for repayment of the bond. It has been suggested that the loan arrangement exhibited "bad judgement" or a conflict of interest on Nyanda's part. The Daily Maverick argued that the conflict of interest was particularly pertinent because the BAE Hawks and Gripens were purchased by the government in three tranches, and Hlongwane's commission agreement granted him a substantial bonus if the third tranche was approved in 2004 – a decision over which the Daily Maverick claimed Nyanda "would have had direct and material influence."

==== Chippy Shaik ====
In 2011, City Press reported that SANIP had made a loan of R750 000 to Professor Viktor Verijenko of the University of KwaZulu-Natal, who had been Shaik's PhD supervisor. Shaik was stripped of his PhD in 2008 when the university discovered that he had plagiarised other academics, including Verijenko. Verijenko received the loan, through his company Veriytech, on extremely favourable terms – it was unsecured, rand-denominated, interest-free, and without fixed repayment terms – and, according to SANIP financial records, it was later written off in full. There was no evidence that the payment was directly related to Shaik's doctorate, but journalists noted that it had been made at the same time that the doctorate was awarded.

==== Stella Sigcau ====
In 2013, the Sunday Times reported that Stella Sigcau, who was Minister of Public Enterprises during the Arms Deal negotiations, was allegedly bribed by BAE in exchange for her support for the BAE bids. Based on encrypted faxes and information from former BAE employees, it claimed that BAE had supported Sigcau's daughter while she was living in London, including with accommodation, furnishings, and help with professional networking. In a 1998 fax leaked to the Times, the former regional head of BAE wrote:

[T]he fact we have got Hawk on to the final list is very much due to our friends in the country rather than the quality of our ITP [invitation to prequalify] response. One friend who has, and remains, absolutely critical to our ultimate success for both Hawk and Gripen is Minister Stella Sigcau.

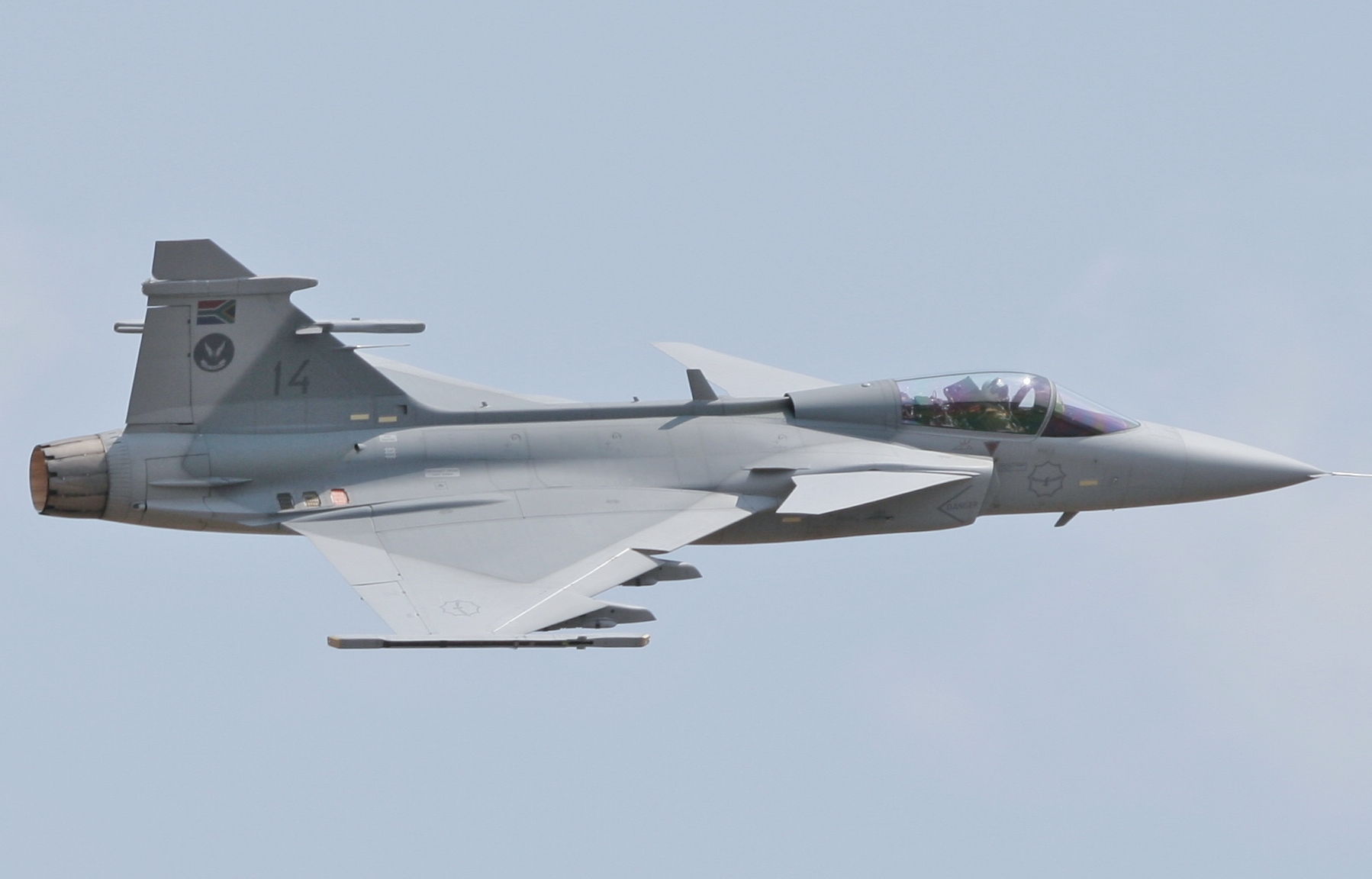
A South African Air Force JAS Gripen purchased during the arms deal

=== Saab ===
As mentioned above, Saab was contracted alongside BAE Systems to provide the fighter aircraft, and its South African subsidiary Sanip had signed consultancy agreements with Hlongwane. In 2011, when the Sanip agreements were receiving public attention, Saab chief executive officer Håkan Buskhe announced that Saab had investigated and had found that Sanip had paid about R24 million to Hlognwane, after the same amount was transferred to Sanip by BAE. Yet he distanced Saab from the payments, saying that the transactions were never entered into the Sanip accounts and had occurred without Saab's knowledge. Instead, a BAE employee had signed the contracts and had apparently approved inaccurate financial statements concealing them. However, according to the Daily Maverick, it later emerged that Saab had also contracted directly with Hlongwane. Between October 2003 and October 2004, Saab allegedly paid Hlongwane Consulting €18,000 per month for advice on political, economic, and security policy.

==== Numsa ====
In July 1999, the South African National Civics Organisation (SANCO) and the influential National Union of Metalworkers of South Africa (Numsa) – then the largest affiliate of the Congress of South African Trade Unions – jointly announced their support for Saab's bid for the fighter aircraft contract. The announcement referred to "reciprocal agreements" by which Saab and two Swedish trade unions, including IF Metall, would support Numsa in establishing an industrial training school. The De Lille dossier alleged that this initiative was a cover for or means of laundering R30 million or more in Arms Deal-related bribes and payments, and that allegation was revived in 2012 by a Swedish TV4 programme, which focused on the involvement of Stefan Löfven, who later became Prime Minister of Sweden. Löfven was the head of Metall's international section in 1999 and reportedly was a good friend of Moses Mayekiso, who was an ANC member, the head of SANCO, and a former head of Numsa, where he retained significant influence. Following an internal investigation, Numsa had decided to distance itself from Arms Deal-related projects, but had continued to receive assistance from Metall. Saab later provided Sanco with a R2.5-million loan, which may have been written off without payment. Saab, Metall, Numsa, and Mayekiso all denied that there had been any irregularities in any arrangement among them.

=== Thyssen ===
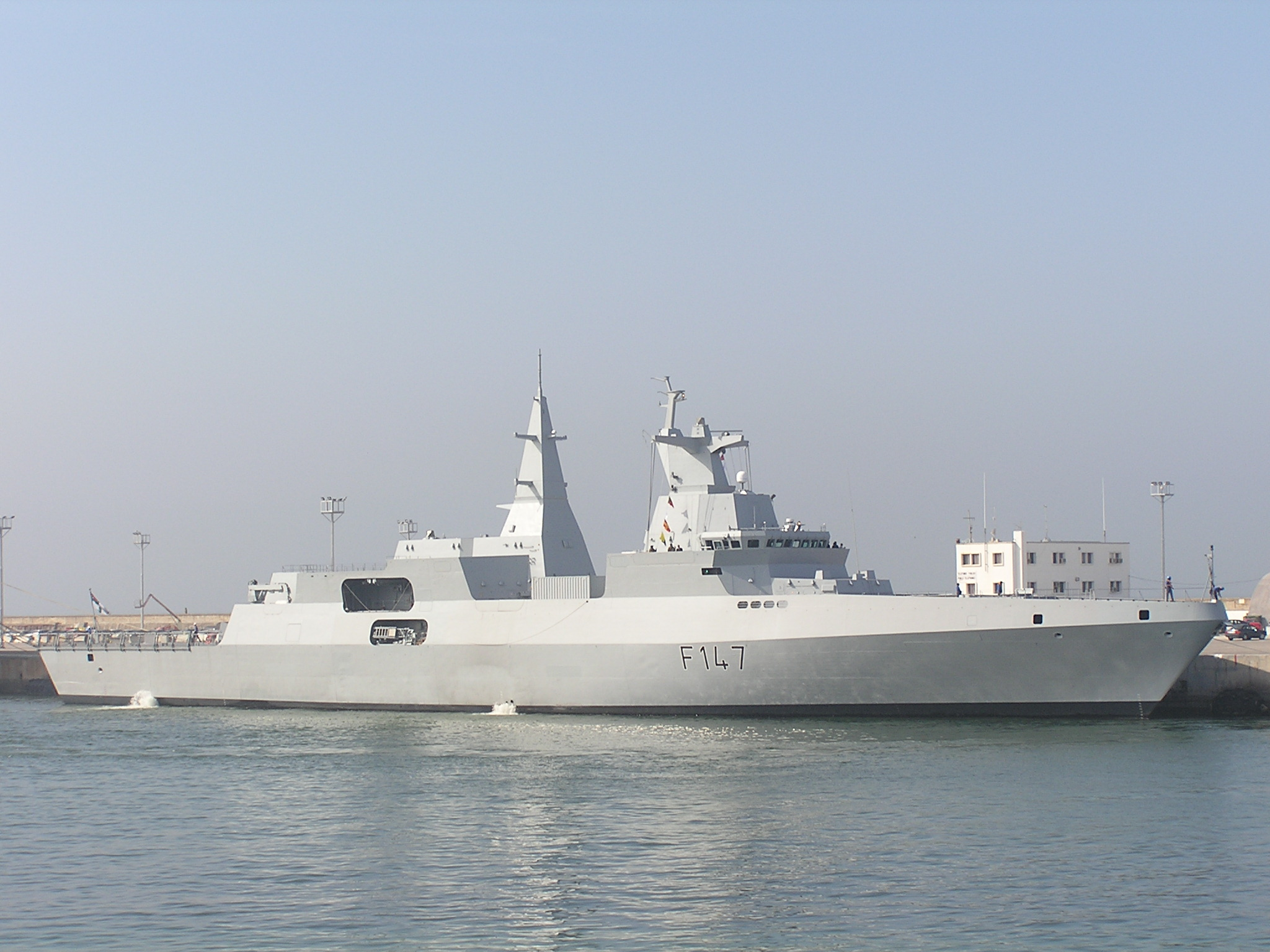
SAS Spioenkop, one of the four German-built frigates procured in 1999

ThyssenKrupp is an engineering conglomerate which led the German Frigate Consortium, the winner of the contract, valued at R6.9 billion, to supply four corvettes. Between 2006 and 2008, Thyssen was under investigation by German prosecuting authorities for possible corruption related to the Arms Deal. In 2007, Der Spiegel reported that there was evidence suggesting that Thyssen had paid bribes to South Africans while bidding for the contract. It had listed $25 million in its balance sheet as "useful expenditures" related to the contract, which Der Spiegel said had been a common way of accounting for foreign bribe payments before such payments became illegal in Germany in 1999. About $22 million allegedly went through a company registered in Liberia to Tony Georgiadis, a Greek businessman, who was apparently hired by Thyssen as a lobbyist and who had links to politicians including Mbeki and Bulelani Ngcuka. Blohm + Voss, another of the three companies in the consortium, was implicated through the possible involvement of one of its former managers. However, the German investigation was dropped without any charges being laid, reportedly after a tax settlement was reached.

In November 2007, Patricia de Lille alleged in Parliament that in January 1999 Thyssen had paid R500,000 each to the ANC (through a Swiss bank account), to the Nelson Mandela Children's Fund, and to the Foundation for Community Development, a Mozambican charity linked to Graça Machel. The allegations were based on photocopies of three such cheques discovered in a German raid at the house of a Thyssen executive. They were denied by the Fund and by Terror Lekota, who had succeeded Modise as Defence Minister in 1999. In 2008, the Mail & Guardian reported that it had seen confidential documents showing that R500,000 payments had indeed been made in 1999 to the ANC, to the Nelson Mandela Children's Fund, and to the Foundation for Community Development, not directly from Thyssen but rather from Georgiadis. According to the documents, the payments were charitable donations by Georgiadis and were not intended to influence the Arms Deal in any way.

==== Chippy Shaik ====
Der Spiegel alleged that internal memos appeared to show that Chippy Shaik had requested and received a $3-million payment from Thyssen as a fee for the success of its bid. The payment was allegedly made in 2000 to a front company in London. As Chief of Acquisitions at the Department of Defence, Shaik had managed the Special Defence Account from which the package was funded, controlled all policy and planning on defence acquisition matters, and chaired or served on several of the Arms Deal procurement committees. A few months after the Der Spiegel revelations, the National Prosecuting Authority (NPA) announced that it would not pursue charges against Shaik. By then, he had emigrated, saying that South Africa had been ungrateful for his "back-breaking work" and that the allegations were a part of an "ongoing campaign" against him and his family.

In 2010, the Sunday Times released parts of a memo written by a Thyssen executive in August 1998. The memo records Shaik telling Thyssen representatives that the German Frigate Consortium's bid

was pulled into first place in spite of the Spanish offer being 20% cheaper. The Spanish offset was according to him also valued higher than ours. In this respect it had, according to him, been no simple exercise to get us into first place.

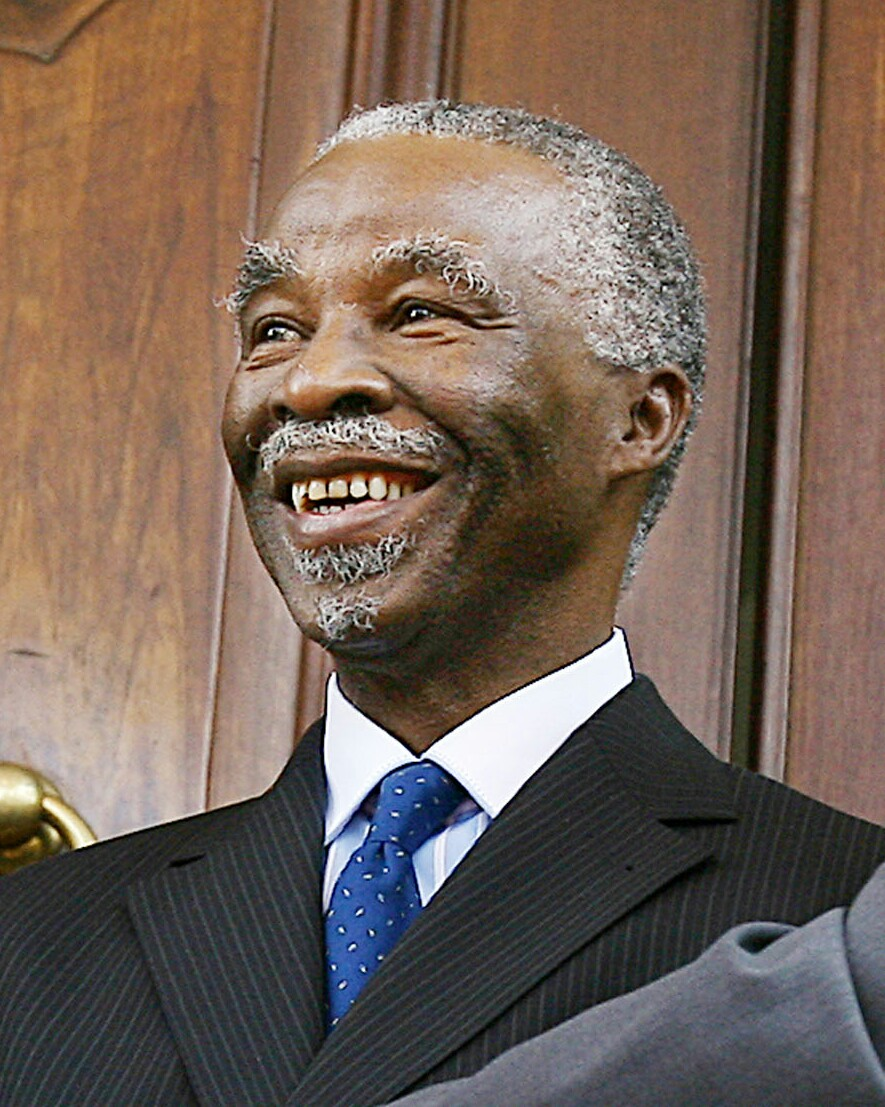
Thabo Mbeki was Deputy President and then President during the Arms Deal negotiations.

==== Thabo Mbeki ====
Thabo Mbeki, who was president from June 1999 and Deputy President before then, was "alleged to have helped 'turn' the tender in ThyssenKrupp's favour." This allegation originated from the De Lille dossier, which claimed that Thyssen had not originally been shortlisted as a supplier in 1995, but had been added to the list after Mbeki, while Deputy President, visited Germany. De Lille found this timing "suspicious" and meritorious of further investigation.

==== Joe Modise ====
While Modise was Defence Minister, ThyssenKrupp subcontracted South African logistics coordinator Futuristic Business Solutions, at a price of R1.2 million, allegedly to influence procurement decisions. This was controversial because it later emerged that two of the company's directors were member of Modise's extended family, implying a conflict of interest. Those were Lambert Moloi – an Umkhonto weSizwe stalwart, a former SANDF lieutenant-general, a Denel director, and Modise's brother-in-law – and Moloi's son-in-law.

==== Tony Yengeni ====
In 2013, amaBhungane reported that, according to German detectives, Yengeni had signed a R6-million bribe agreement with Thyssen in September 1995, while he was chairperson of the joint standing committee on defence and prior to the conclusion of the Defence Review. The detectives claimed to have found a copy of the agreement during a 2006 raid of ThyssenKrupp's Düsseldorf headquarters, as part of the investigation into the Arms Deal payments. No charges were brought in Germany – probably in part because the agreement had been signed before foreign bribery became illegal in German law – or in South Africa. Yengeni did not respond to the allegations, but he complained to the Press Ombudsman that the amaBhungane article had been unfair and defamatory. His complaint was dismissed in its substantive aspects.

=== Thomson/Thales ===
French arms company Thales, previously known as Thomson-CSF, received a R2.6-billion contract to supply the combat suites for the new German corvettes. This contract has become the most highly litigated element of the Arms Deal, owing primarily to the involvement of former President Jacob Zuma through his relationship to his "close friend" and financial advisor, Schabir Shaik, whose company Nkobi Holdings was Thales's black economic empowerment partner in the bid and who made several million rands' worth of corrupt payments to Zuma over several years.

The South African subsidiary of Thales, formerly known as Thint, was co-accused in Shaik's corruption trial, although those charges were dropped. A former Thales employee, Ajay Sooklal, has implicated former French president Jacques Chirac in attempts to shield Thales from prosecution. However, the company is currently co-accused in a criminal case against Zuma, charged with one count of racketeering, two counts of corruption, and one count of money laundering. The state alleges that, through Shaik, Thales paid Zuma for political support in securing the Arms Deal contract and for protection against investigation. Thales has challenged the charges multiple times in various courts, arguing that it had a legitimate business relationship with Shaik and that it was unaware of his payments to Zuma. In January 2021, the Pietermaritzburg High Court declined to set aside the charges, finding that there was "reasonable and probable cause to believe" that Thales had been party to "a pattern of racketeering" with Shaik.

==== Schabir Shaik ====
Shaik had substantial interests in Nkobi Investments, which owned shares in Thomson-CSF and Thomson-CSF holdings (a South African-registered joint venture with Thomson). He also had interests in Altech Defence Systems (ADS, later renamed African Defence Systems), which Thomson-CSF acquired between April 1998 and February 1999. In the period in which the Arms Deal contracts were being evaluated and negotiated, Shaik held directorships at Thomson-CSF and Thomson-CSF Holdings, as well as at Nkobi Holdings, Nkobi Investments, and ADS. He was thus highly invested in the Arms Deal tenders, for which both ADS and Thomson were bidders – Thomson for the corvettes as well as their combat suites, and ADS for subcontracts under the corvette, submarine, and helicopter programmes. Both Thomson and ADS were ultimately awarded subcontracts.

In June 2005, Shaik was sentenced to 15 years' imprisonment on two counts of corruption and one count of fraud in relation to the Arms Deal, though he was released on medical parole in 2009. The fraud charge was for misrepresenting the financial records of one of his companies. Both corruption charges related to undue payments which Shaik had made to Zuma. Between 1995 and 2002, Shaik paid Zuma a total of R1.28 million, either directly or through his companies, in the knowledge that Zuma would be unable to pay him back. The court found that this suggested that the payments had been made in anticipation of some business-related benefit that Zuma could deliver through his political office and connections. Separately, Shaik also facilitated a pre-arranged annual payment of R500,000 from Thales to Zuma, through Shaik's business accounts, starting in 2000. The court concluded that the annual payments were intended to purchase Zuma's assistance in protecting Thales from investigation and improving its profile for future government tenders.

==== Chippy Shaik ====
The 2001 joint investigation found that Chippy Shaik, brother of Schabir and the Department of Defence's Chief of Acquisitions, had had a conflict of interest arising from Schabir's commercial interest in the outcome of the Arms Deal procurement. Although Chippy had declared his conflict of interest in December 1998 and committed to recuse himself, he had in practice failed to recuse himself properly and had continued to participate in the process that ultimately led to Schabir-owned companies being awarded contracts. The investigators also noted that the contracts with Thomson and ADS were evaluated by the department at the same time that Schabir was negotiating the purchase of ADS by Thomson. While indicting Schabir, the NPA claimed that Chippy had exerted pressure on Thomson to partner with Schabir. Richard Young, whose company was a losing bidder, alleged that Chippy had had an improper influence on the selection of the combat suite contracts, though Chippy denies this.

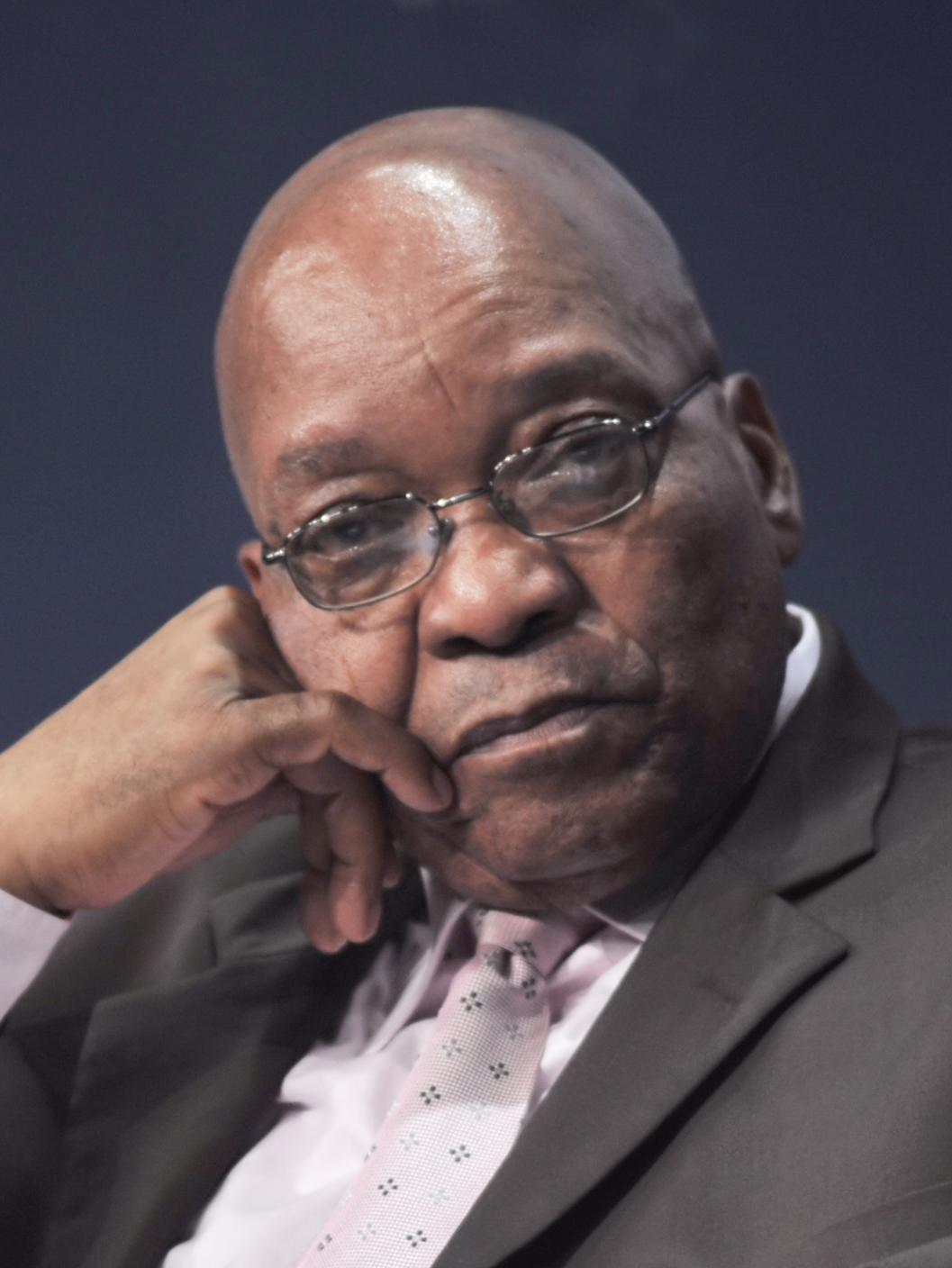
As of 2022, former President Jacob Zuma faces criminal charges in relation to the Arms Deal.

==== Jacob Zuma ====
In late 2002, the NPA announced that the Scorpions were investigating Zuma, then Deputy President, for corruption related to the Arms Deal. In August 2003, National Director of Public Prosecutions Bulelani Ngcuka told the media that the NPA had a "prima facie case of corruption" against Zuma but had decided not to prosecute on the basis that the case was probably not winnable. However, Shaik's trial heavily implicated Zuma, given that the key aspect of the state's case was that there had been a "generalised pattern of corrupt behaviour" between Zuma and Shaik, and Mbeki fired Zuma as Deputy President in June 2005, shortly after Shaik's conviction. Zuma was charged with corruption, fraud, and racketeering in 2006 and in 2007, but both times the case was struck off the court roll, first because of repeated delays by the NPA and then on a legal technicality. In 2009, the Supreme Court of Appeal overturned the dismissal of the 2007 charges, reopening the possibility of prosecution, but the acting National Director of Public Prosecutions, Mokotedi Mpshe, decided not to pursue charges. Zuma was elected president shortly afterwards.

Opposition party the Democratic Alliance applied to have the NPA's decision reviewed. In 2016, while Zuma was president, the High Court ruled that the decision in 2009 to withdraw the charges had been irrational, and that the NPA should reconsider. The ruling was supported by the Supreme Court of Appeal in 2017. The month after Zuma resigned from the presidency, in March 2018, the NPA formally reinstated the charges against him. He is charged with one count of racketeering, one count of money laundering, two counts of corruption, and twelve counts of fraud, in relation to 783 payments made to him by Shaik with money received partly or entirely from Thales. Zuma pleaded not guilty in May 2021, and the case is ongoing.

=== Ferrostaal ===
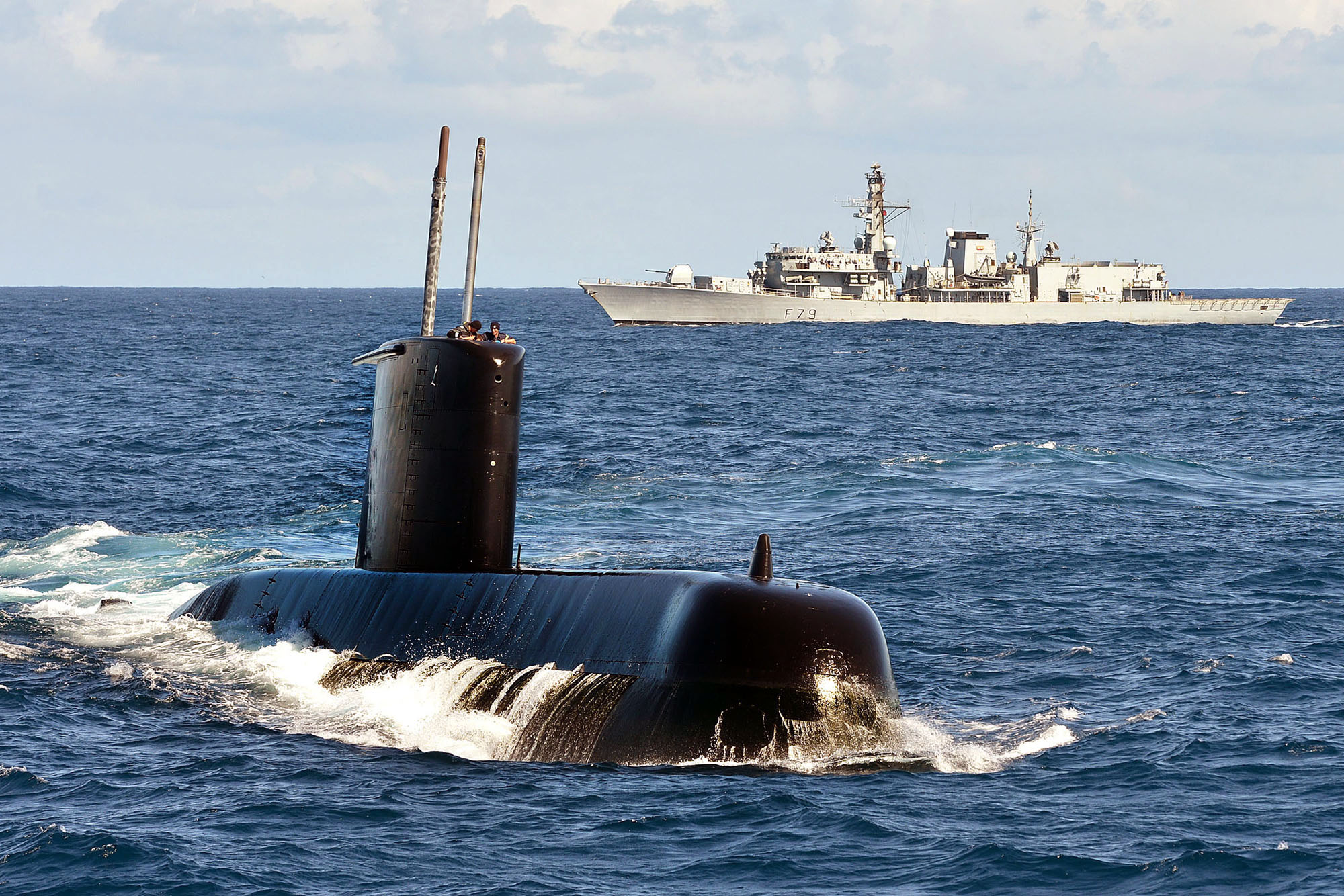
SAS Charlotte Maxeke, one of three German-built Type 209 submarines procured in the Arms Deal

MAN Ferrostaal, leader of the German Submarine Consortium which won the submarine contract during the Arms Deal, initially maintained that it had not been party to any Arms Deal misconduct but later hired Debevoise & Plimpton to conduct an internal audit. The report, which was leaked in 2011, found that Ferrostaal had paid $40 million (about R300 million) to gain "political access" to support its bid for the contract. It also found that this political access had had a "decisive influence" on the bid's success. The two main contacts were allegedly Tony Georgiadis (who received about $20 million, through a commission agreement signed in October 1998) and Tony Ellingford (who also received about $20 million between 2000 and 2003); and they allegedly introduced Ferrostaal representatives to senior politicians including Mbeki and Modise.

==== Chippy Shaik ====
The Debevoise & Plimpton report also highlighted concerns about Ferrostaal's "close business connections" with Chippy Shaik, both during and after his tenure at the Department of Defence – indeed, in 2004, Shaik entered into a joint mining venture with Ferrostaal. The audit report said that care had not been taken to ensure propriety in this relationship, and flagged the fact that Shaik had bought shares from Ferrostaal at a significant loss to the latter. It also said that in 2008, when questioned about its relationship with Shaik, Ferrostaal had "made the inaccurate statement" that it had ended its relationship with Shaik's company upon learning Shaik's involvement. AmaBhungane reported that Shaik also appeared to have been involved in the local subsidiary which Ferrostaal set up in order to meet its close to €3-billion in offset obligations under the Arms Deal contract.

==== Thabo Mbeki ====
The De Lille dossier alleged that, like Thyssen, Ferrostaal had not been a shortlisted supplier in 1995 but had been added after Mbeki visited Germany. In 2008, the Sunday Times reported, based on a confidential study by consulting group Control Risks, that Ferrostaal had allegedly paid Mbeki R30 million in bribes, and that Mbeki had given R2 million of that amount to Jacob Zuma and donated the rest to the ANC. Mbeki denied the claims, including in a 2003 government press statement.

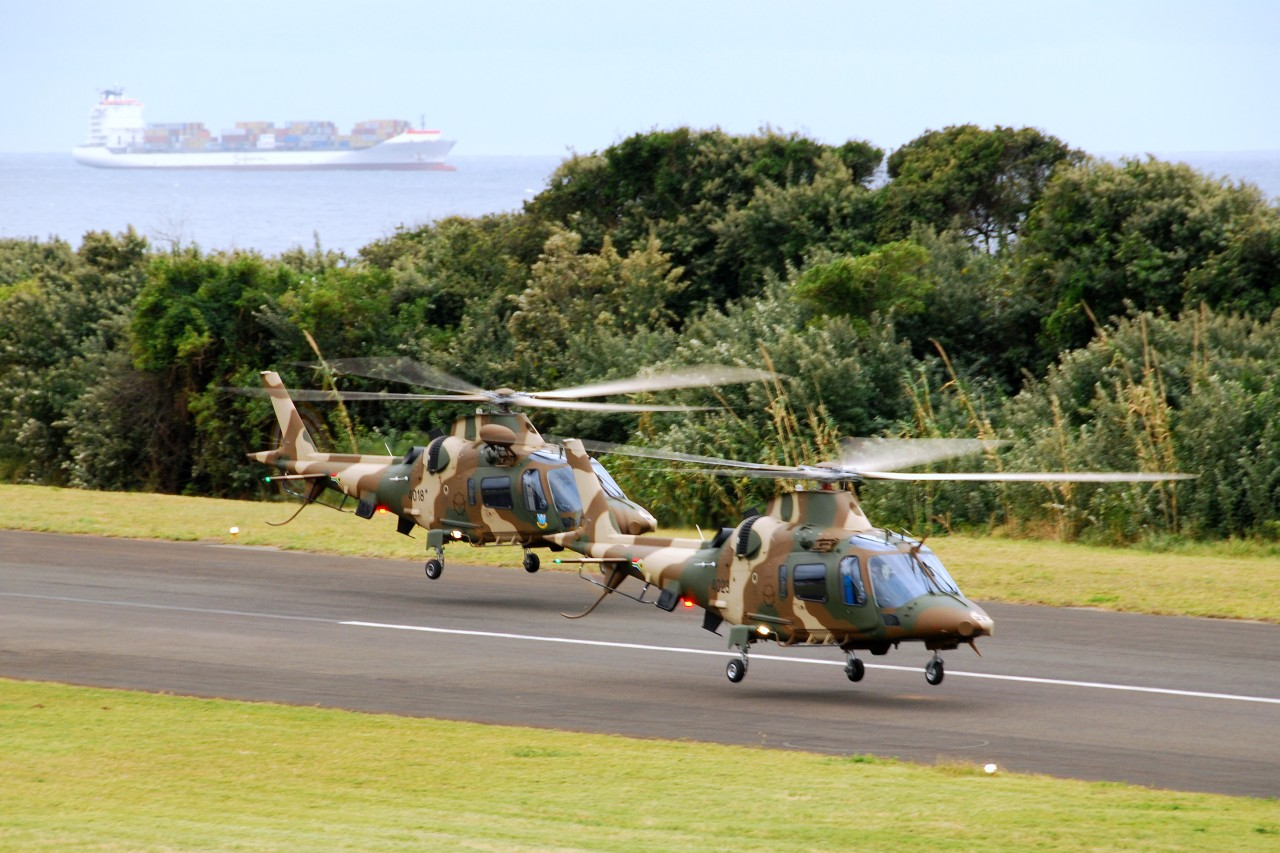
Two of the South African Agustas

=== Agusta ===
In 2011, academics Paul Holden and Hennie van Vuuren published The Devil in the Detail: How the Arms Deal Changed Everything, which alleged that there had been corruption in the helicopter contract with Italian arms company Agusta. They claimed that Agusta offered "inducements... to connected political individuals" to manipulate figures in order to ensure that Agusta emerged as the preferred bidder. The allegations related to Agusta's relationship with Futuristic Business Solutions, which Agusta gave an estimated R750 million in subcontracts. An American competitor for the contract, Bell, which offered a lower price and more modern product than Agusta, claimed that it had been pressured to subcontract Futuristic Business Solutions – the same allegation made by losing bidder Aermacchi in respect of the aircraft contracts. Futuristic Business Solutions was the same Modise-linked firm which had been contracted by Thyssen, the winner of the corvette contract.
