= List of Saab JAS 39 Gripen potential operators and failed bids =

Saab JAS 39 Gripen potential operators and failed bids is the proposed or rejected selection and purchase of the Saab JAS 39 Gripen.

== Potential operators ==
Botswana

In 2014, Saab opened an office in Botswana. The country is interested in buying eight surplus Gripen C/Ds, with possible extension to 16, to replace the Botswana Defence Force Air Wing's (BDF) 14 ex-Royal Canadian Air Force CF-5 fighters used since 1996. BDF officials reportedly believed the Gripen acquisition was a done deal when interviewed in 2016.

Canada

Canada is a level 3 industrial partner in the Lockheed Martin F-35 Lightning II development program. However an open fighter competition was launched in December 2017 to identify a replacement for its CF-18 fighter. The Royal Canadian Air Force announced in February 2018 that Saab was a contestant along with the F-35. The competition was very dependent on industrial benefits for Canadian companies; in May 2019, Saab offered to build Gripens in Canada akin to the Brazilian arrangement.

In June 2019, Saab stated it was ready to offer 88 Gripen Es to Canada, in addition to full transfer of technology, Saab stated that they could offer the integration of American and other non-Saab equipment so that the aircraft is interoperable with the US military. Saab also stated the Gripen E was built for arctic conditions. In January 2021, Saab offered to build two aerospace centers in Canada as part of the technology transfer proposal. On 1 December 2021, the Canadian government confirmed that the Super Hornet did not meet its requirements and reduced the competitors to the F-35 and the Gripen.

In late March 2022, the Canadian government announced its intention to negotiate a contract to purchase the F-35. By early December 2022, defence sources revealed an initial funding request for 16 F-35s had been approved by the Treasury Board of Canada, though Saab claimed their offer remained eligible for selection.

By 2023 Canada's Future Fighter Capability Project evaluated both the F-35 and Gripen as meeting the mandatory requirements of the Royal Canadian Air Force, however the F-35 reportedly significantly outperformed the Gripen in every category. This led the Trudeau Government to ultimately select the F-35 in 2023, despite campaigning in 2015 on a promise to not purchase the F-35. On 9 January 2023, the government announced the signing of a final contract to procure 88 F-35s, seeming to end the Gripen's chance for selection.

However, in 2025 following repeated threats by President Donald Trump to turn Canada into the "51st State" and the onset of the US-initiated trade war, the new Canadian government under Prime Minister Mark Carney opted to re-evaluate and review the F-35 purchase. By January 2026, Saab tied its offer of 12,000 new jobs in Canada to the purchase of 72 Gripen jets and 6 of its GlobalEye systems. In the wake of the Trump's threats to annex Greenland by force and consistent rhetoric about making Canada the 51st State, government sources in Ottawa indicated that the government was now strongly considering the Gripen for at least half of its fleet due to the potential job creation, and as part of Canada's broader efforts to diversify its trade and reduce defense dependency with the United States.

Colombia

Colombia's new fighter will be the Saab Gripen E/F, the country's president has confirmed in April 2025. The acquisition of the Swedish-made combat aircraft will finally allow for the retirement of the veteran IAI Kfir with the Colombian Air Force.

The sale of 17 aircraft for SEK 34 billion was agreed in November 2025. Delivery will take place between 2026 and 2032.

Philippines

In September 2016, Saab announced its intention to open an office in Manila to support its campaign to sell the Gripen to fill the Philippine Air Force's requirement for 12 multirole fighters; Saab also intends to offer ground infrastructure, integrated C2 systems and datalinks, similar to the capabilities of the Royal Thai Air Force. In 2018, Saab renewed its sales push. The Department of National Defense is reportedly more likely to buy six Gripen C/D MS20 over the US offer of F-16V Block 70/72. According to Swedish newspaper Aftonbladet, Swedish ISP Exportkontrollrådet (Export Control Council) ruled in November 2022 to approve export to the Philippines. They also raise the option of providing leased JAS 39 Gripens as a counter-offer to the F-16V offer of the United States. In June 2023, the Philippines and Sweden signed a memorandum of understanding (MOU) during the Shangri-La Dialogue in Singapore, paving the way for a potential agreement that would see Sweden supplying 12 Gripen C/D MS20 multirole fighter aircraft to the Philippine Air Force (PAF). The MOU on defence materiel cooperation was signed by Acting Defence Secretary Carlito Galvez Jr. and Swedish Defence Minister Pål Jonson.

Ukraine

Since 2014, Ukraine considered locally producing the JAS 39 Gripen under license, but such plans were abandoned and the country focused on overhauling and upgrading its fleet of Soviet-era combat aircraft instead.

In 2020, the Kyiv Post reported that Ukraine had plans on fully replacing its fleet of MiG-29s, Su-27s, Su-25s, and Su-24Ms with 72−108 Western 4.5 generation multirole combat aircraft such as the Gripen E/F or F-16 Block 70/72 by 2035.

In July 2022, the Minister of Defence Oleksii Reznikov announced the JAS 39 Gripen as a candidate aircraft for the Ukrainian Air Force. In August 2023 after visiting Sweden's Prime Minister Ulf Kristersson Ukraine's President Volodymyr Zelenskyy said that "Ukrainian pilots had already begun training on the planes." In early December 2023, it was reported that there were fruitful bilateral discussions about the possible transfer of Gripen aircraft to the Armed Forces of Ukraine.

On 9 September 2024, Sweden announced its 17th aid package for Ukraine of 4.6 billion Swedish crowns or US$443 million. Funds were included to "facilitate a transfer of Gripen fighter jets in the future".

On 6 February 2025, Commander-in-Chief of the AFU General Oleksandr Syrskyi confirmed that negotiations on the transfer of Gripens C/D to Ukraine are still ongoing. On 29 September 2025, it was claimed that Gripens would be delivered to the Ukrainian Air Force, although this was denied by Sweden, with Swedish PM Ulf Kristersson stating only that he had "discussed" the acquisition of Gripens with Ukraine's President Zelenskyy.

On 22 October 2025, Ukraine signed a declaration of intent to buy up to 150 Gripens, which was announced at a press conference held by Zelenskyy and Kristersson.

There are plans to begin licensed production of the Gripen in Lviv, Ukraine. On 17 April 2026, President Volodymyr Zelenskyy and King Carl XVI Gustaf of Sweden met in Lviv, where in Zelenskyy discussed that Ukraine expects to begin training pilots on the Gripens in as early as 2026.

=== Others ===
Other countries that previously expressed interest in Gripen but have not yet pursued a contract include:

- Ecuador (C/D, or E/F from Brazil)
- Estonia
- Kenya (C/D)
- Latvia
- Lithuania
- Malaysia (C/D)
- Mexico (C/D, or E/F from Brazil)
- Namibia (C/D)
- Peru (C/D, or E/F from Brazil)
- Portugal (C/D)
- Serbia
- Slovenia
- Vietnam

Saab's head of exports Eddy de La Motte has stated in 2013 that Gripen's chances have improved as nations waver in their commitments to the F-35. In September 2013, Saab's CEO Håkan Buskhe said he envisioned Gripen sales to reach 400 or 450 aircraft.

== Failed bids ==
=== Argentina ===
Used F-16s from Denmark were selected instead.

=== Austria ===
Starting in the 1990s, the Gripen was one candidate to replace the Austrian Air Force's aging Saab 35 Drakens; the Eurofighter Typhoon was selected in 2003. During the mid-2010s, Austria started considering replacing its Typhoons with Gripens due to obsolescence and cost, as they are all Tranche 1 and need upgrades to be retained.

In 2023, Austria decided to upgrade its Typhoons and is considering enlarging its fleet.

=== Belgium ===
Sweden withdrew from the Belgian F-16 replacement competition due to foreign policy incompatibility.

=== Bulgaria ===
In response to the Bulgarian Air Force's interest in the Gripen, the Gerdzhikov caretaker cabinet announced in April 2017 the fighter's section by a state commission and plans for an initial batch of eight Gripens at up to 1.5 billion BGN (ca. 745 million euro), to be delivered around 2018–2020, along with a second batch of eight later. Competing bids included used USAF F-16A/Bs to be modernised to MLU standard by the Portuguese OGMA (similar to Bulgaria's neighbour Romania) and used Italian Tranche 1 Eurofighter Typhoons, with the US/Portuguese offer finishing second and the Italian offer third. According to the deputy prime minister and minister of defence Stefan Yanev, the Gripen's selection was primarily due to Saab's offer of favourable financial terms, such as a lease option and offset agreements, accounting for about one billion BGN for the aircraft alone ($834 million), while the US/Portuguese bid accounted a price of about one and a half billion BGN for the aircraft alone. The second-place offer was retained as a back-up option if negotiations with Saab failed; program finances were budgeted through to 2017. It would replace both the MiG-29 fighters of Graf Ignatievo Air Base and the Su-25 attack aircraft of Bezmer Air Base, as well as the already retired Su-22 reconnaissance aircraft.

In October 2018, potential suppliers responded to a renewed tender, consisting of new F-16V Vipers from Lockheed Martin, new Boeing F/A-18E/F Super Hornets, used Eurofighter Typhoons from Italy and used Gripen C/Ds from Sweden. France, Germany, Israel and Portugal did not respond to requests for used Eurofighter Typhoons and F-16 variants. In December 2018, Saab submitted an improved offer to supply 10 new Gripen C/Ds instead of the previously proposed 8. However, in December 2018, the Bulgarian Ministry of Defence selected the F-16V offer as the preferred option, and recommended talks with the US. On 3 June 2019, the US State Department approved the possible sale of 8 F-16Vs to Bulgaria at an estimate cost of $1.67 billion. On 10 July 2019, Bulgaria approved the acquisition of eight F-16V Block 70/72s for US$1.25bn. The deal was vetoed by the Bulgarian President, Rumen Radev on 23 July 2019, citing the need for a broader consensus, returning it to parliament. On 26 July 2019, parliament again approved the deal, overruling the veto, and was approved by Radev. In April 2020, Lockheed Martin was contracted by the US government to produce Bulgaria's F-16Vs, completion is expected in 2027.

In September 2022, there were reports that Bulgaria had been given an offer from the Swedish government of procuring 10 Gripen C/Ds from Sweden for delivery within two years. The "24chasa" newspaper referenced a letter from Bulgarian Acting Minister of Defense Dimitar Stojanov to his Swedish counterpart Peter Hultqvist dated 30 September 2022. Dimitar Stojanov allegedly wrote in the letter that they would like to receive a more detailed offer, including an option of a leasing arrangement, and he invited Swedish representatives to visit Sofia to discuss further details. Peter Hultqvist's office confirmed to the Swedish news agency TT that it concerned a potential procurement inquiry. At the time Saab offered no comments on the issue. The Swedish Defence Materiel Administration, FMV, claimed that they were aware of reports about Bulgarian interest but they had not received any formal inquiry so they refrained from commenting.

=== Chile ===
The Gripen was one of the aircraft evaluated by the Chilean Air Force in 1999. Chile finally selected the F-16 over the Gripen, Boeing F/A-18, and Dassault Mirage 2000–5.

=== Croatia ===
On 24 October 2015, Sweden announced its Gripen C/D bid for Croatia's fighter replacement requirement, following a request for information from the Croatian Ministry of Defence in June for between 8 and 12 new-build aircraft to replace Croatia's fleet of MiG-21bis aircraft. The LTDP would run from 2015 to 2024 and was scheduled to have funding available for a replacement aircraft in 2019. On 29 March 2018, the Croatian government chose Israel's bid of 12 F-16C/D Barak 2020 fighters over the Gripen; this sale was halted in January 2019 after the US failed to approve Israel's sale of the modified aircraft to Croatia. Sweden submitted another response in September 2020 following a second RFP identifying Croatia's requirements issued in the spring 2020 for twelve fighters. The second RFP opened up the competition to both new and secondhand aircraft. On 28 May 2021, the Prime Minister of Croatia Andrej Plenković announced that the Croatian Government will buy 12 used French Rafale F3R fighters for the Croatian Air Force.

=== Denmark ===
In 2007, Denmark signed a Memorandum of Understanding between the Defence Ministers of Sweden and Denmark to evaluate the Gripen as a replacement for Denmark's fleet of 48 F-16s. Denmark also requested the development of Gripen variants featuring more powerful engines, larger payloads, longer range, and additional avionics; this request contributed to Saab's decision to proceed with the JAS E/F's development. Denmark repeatedly delayed the purchase decision; in 2013, Saab indicated that the Gripen was one of four contenders for the Danish purchase, alongside Boeing's Super Hornet, Lockheed Martin's F-35 Lightning II, and the Eurofighter Typhoon. Denmark is a level-3 partner in the JSF programme, and has already invested US$200 million. The final selection was to be in mid-2015 where an order for 24 to 30 fighters was expected. The Swedish government announced on 21 July 2014 the Gripen's withdrawal from the Danish competition, having chosen not to respond to the invitation to tender.

On 9 June 2016, the Danish defence committee agreed to purchase 27 F-35As to replace its F-16s for US$3 billion. In May 2019, Danish Minister of Defence Claus Hjort Frederiksen stated that Denmark is considering stationing fighters in Greenland to counter Russia's expanding military presence in the Arctic region. Frederiksen said that Greenland's air defense would need at least four fighters, in turn requiring Denmark to make an additional purchase. In January 2020, Lockheed Martin announced that assembly had begun on L-001, the first of 27 F-35As destined for Denmark. According to DR, the Danish public service broadcaster, the US spied on other contenders, Danish ministries, and the defense industry to gain an advantage in the procurement process.

=== Finland ===
The Gripen's first export bid was to Finland, where it competed against F-16, F/A-18, MiG-29 and Mirage 2000 to replace the Finnish Air Force's J 35 Draken and MiG-21 fleet. In May 1992, McDonnell Douglas F/A-18C/D was announced as a winner on performance and cost grounds. The Finnish Minister of Defence, Elisabeth Rehn, stated that delays in Gripen's development schedule had hurt its chances in the competition.

In June 2015, a working group set up by the Finnish MoD proposed starting a program to replace the Finnish Air Force's F/A-18 Hornet fleet; it recognized five potential types: Boeing F/A-18E/F Super Hornet, Dassault Rafale, Eurofighter Typhoon, Lockheed Martin F-35, and Gripen. In December 2015, the Finnish MoD sent a letter to Britain, France, Sweden and the US, informing them that the HX Fighter Program had launched to buy multi-role fighters by around 2025 and mentioned the Gripen. A Request for Information (RFI) for the program was sent in April 2016, and five responses were received by November 2016; an official request for quotations was sent to all five responders in 2018. On 29 January 2020, the Gripen E prototype 39–10 landed at Tampere–Pirkkala Airport to participate in HX Challenge, the HX Fight Program's flight evaluations. It was later followed by Gripen NG demonstrator 39–7 (sensor testbed), while a GlobalEye participated in the trials from Linköping in Sweden.

Saab announced the successful completion of planned tests to demonstrate both the Gripen and GlobalEye. On 31 January 2020 Saab submitted a revised offer in response to the revised Request for Quotation for the HX programme and follow-on BAFO activity anticipated to continue through April 2021. Saab submitted its Best and Final Offer (BAFO) for 64 JAS 39Es, two GlobalEye AEW&C, weapons package, and an option for JAS 39Fs. Over 20% of the proposal price relating to Gripen was for weapons such as Meteor, IRIS-T, KEPD 350, SPEAR, EAJP (Electronic Attack Jammer Pod), and LADM (Lightweight Air-launched Decoy Missile). On 5 December 2021, the Finnish newspaper Iltalehti reported that several sources stated the Finnish Defense Forces recommendation for the F-35 as Finland's next fighter and pointed to its capability and expected long lifespan as key reasons. On 10 December 2021, the F-35's selection was officially confirmed by the Finnish government.

=== India ===
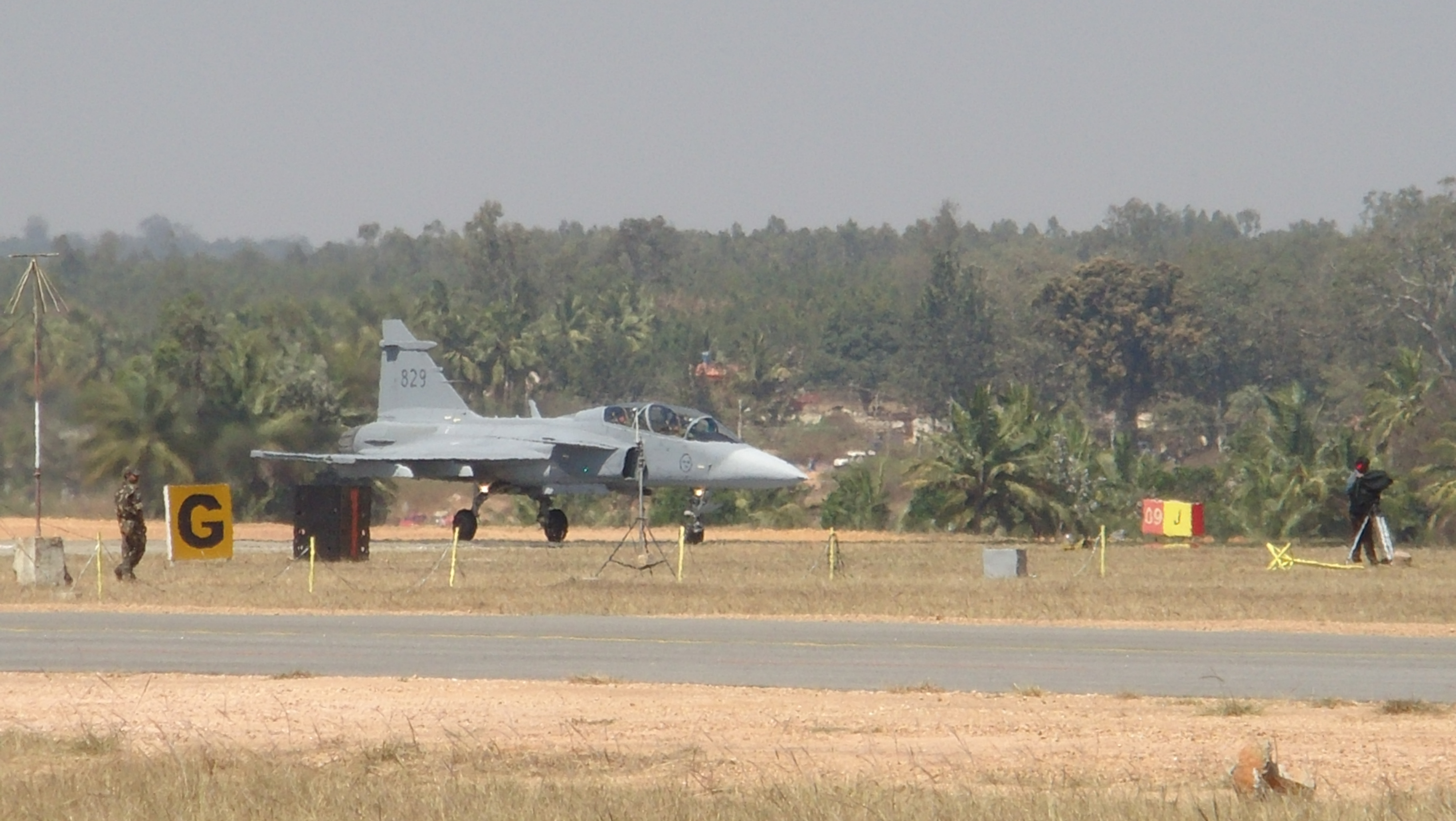
Swedish Air Force Gripen D at Aero India 2011, Yelahanka Air Force Station, Bangalore

The Gripen was a contender for the Indian MRCA competition for 126 multirole combat aircraft. In April 2008, Gripen International offered the Next Generation Gripen for India's tender and opened an office in New Delhi to support its efforts in the Indian market. On 4 February 2009, Saab announced that it had partnered with India's Tata Group to develop the Gripen to fit India's needs. The Indian Air Force (IAF) conducted extensive evaluations of the Gripen's flight performance, logistics capability, weapons systems, advanced sensors and weapons firing. In April 2011, the IAF rejected the bid in favour of the Eurofighter Typhoon and the Dassault Rafale. Allegedly, IAF officials, while happy with the Gripen NG's improved capabilities, noted its high reliance on US-supplied hardware, such as electronics, weaponry and the GE-F414 engine, as a factor that may hamper exports.

In 2015, after the Rafale order was cut back to just 36 aircraft, Saab indicated a willingness to set up joint production of the Gripen in India. In October 2016, Saab, among other manufacturers, reportedly received an informal request-for-information query, resuming a new competition for a single-engine fighter to replace the IAF's Soviet-built MiG-21 and MiG-27 fleets; Saab had already submitted an unsolicited bid. In November 2017, Saab pledged full Gripen E technology transfer to India if it is awarded the contract.

On 23 September 2016, Indian Defence Minister Manohar Parrikar and his French counterpart Jean-Yves Le Drian signed the contract for the purchase of 36 off-the-shelf Rafales in a deal worth €7.8 billion with an option for 18 more at the same inflation-adjusted price. The deliveries were to begin in 2019 and complete by 2022. The deal includes weapons and spares; the aircraft will be equipped with Meteor missiles. The first Rafale was handed over to the Indian Air Force in October 2019. The first batch of 5 fighters arrived in India on 29 July 2020. As of January 2021, a total of 11 fighters have arrived in India from France.

An RFI was again issued by India in April 2018 for the procurement of 114 multi-role combat aircraft at a budget of $20 billion for the Indian Air Force. Gripen is competing with six other types in a fresh tender often referred to as MMRCA 2.0 in the media, for the procurement of 114 multi-role combat aircraft. An official of Saab, on 17 October 2024, stated that Saab offers full technology transfer for setting-up an entire Gripen ecosystem in the country. They aim to deliver the first Gripen-E/F aircraft they are offering within 3 years if they are awarded the contract. They also had discussions with various private sector companies for co-production.

=== Indonesia ===
In July 2016, Saab Indonesia confirmed having submitted a proposal earlier in the year in response to an Indonesian Air Force requirement. The proposal included the initial acquisition of 16 Gripen C/D for US$1.5 billion, to replace Northrop F-5E Tiger II in service with the Indonesian Air Force since the 1980s. Saab have expressed the intention for the bid to "100%" comply with Indonesia's Defence Industry Law 2012 (or, Law Number 16), which requires foreign contractors to work with local industry, collaborating on production and sharing technology. They also indicated that the bid could replace the C/D versions with the E-version, if Indonesia were willing to accept longer delivery times. Competing aircraft for the requirement include the F-16V, Su-35, Dassault Rafale and Eurofighter Typhoon. As of 2023, the Indonesian Air Force has purchased 42 Rafales.

=== Netherlands ===
In July 2008, the Netherlands announced it would evaluate Gripen NG together with four other competitors; in response, Saab offered 85 aircraft to the Royal Netherlands Air Force in August 2008. On 18 December 2008, it was reported that the Netherlands had evaluated the F-35 as having a better performance-price relation than the Gripen NG. On 13 January 2009, NRC Handelsblad claimed that, according to Swedish sources, Saab had offered to deliver 85 Gripens for €4.8 billion to the Dutch Air Force, about 1 billion euro cheaper than budgeted for the F-35.

=== Norway ===
On 18 January 2008, the Norwegian Ministry of Defence issued a Request for Binding Information (RBI) to the Swedish Defence Material Administration, who issued an offer for 48 Gripens in April 2008. On 20 November 2008, the selection of the F-35 Lightning II for the Royal Norwegian Air Force was announced, stating that it was the only candidate to meet all operational requirements; media reports claimed the requirements were tilted in the F-35's favour. Saab and Sweden's defence minister Sten Tolgfors stated that Norway's cost calculations were flawed; the offer being for 48 Gripens over 20 years, but Norway had extrapolated it to operating 57 aircraft over 30 years, thus doubling the cost; cost projections also failed to relate to the Gripen's operational costs. Norway also calculated greater attrition losses than what Sweden considered reasonable. According to Tolgfors, Norway's decision complicated further export deals. In December 2010, leaked United States diplomatic cables revealed that the United States deliberately delayed Sweden's request for access to an AESA radar until after Norway's selection, and that Norway's consideration of the Gripen "was just a show" and that Norway had purchased the F-35 due to "high-level political pressure" from the US.

=== Oman ===
Oman ended up procuring the Eurofighter Typhoon.

=== Pakistan ===
Pakistan was interested in the Gripen C/D, but it was denied by Sweden in 2004.

=== Peru ===
In July 2025 the Peruvian government announced that it is purchasing 24 JAS 39E/F aircraft from Sweden to replace its ageing Mirage 2000s and MiG-29s. However the deal was never formalized before the impeachment of President Dina Boluarte, and the decision was officially reversed in February 2026 by the interim administration. In April 2026 Peru instead selected the F-16 Block 70. While there were initially concerns that the F-16 deal was also falling through it was eventually formalized and the first payment made.

=== Poland ===
The Gripen C/D was a contender for 48 multirole fighters for the Polish Air Force in 2001. On 27 December 2002, the Polish Defence Minister announced the F-16C/D Block 50/52+'s selection. According to Stephen Larrabee, the selection was heavily influenced by Lockheed Martin's lucrative offset agreement (totaling $3.5 billion and 170% offset against Gripen International's €3.2 billion with 146% offset) and by a political emphasis on Poland's strategic relationship with the US and NATO. Both Gripen International and Dassault Aviation (who offered the Mirage 2000-5 Mk 2) described the decision as political. A former vice-minister of defense claimed that the industrial part of the JAS 39 offer was better and included research participation proposals.

In 2014, Poland launched the Harpia program (harpy eagle) aimed at acquiring multi-role combat aircraft from 2021 as part of its modernisation plans to replace the ageing fleet of Sukhoi Su-22M4 'Fitter-K' ground attack aircraft and Mikoyan MiG-29 'Fulcrum' fighters. On 23 November 2017, the Armament Inspectorate announced the start of the procurement process. By 22 December 2017, five entities had expressed interest in the procurement, including Saab AB with Gripen NG, Lockheed Martin with F-35, Boeing with F/A-18, Leonardo with Eurofighter Typhoon and Fights-On Logistics with second hand F-16s. In May 2019, the Polish Defense Ministry formally requested to buy 32 fifth-generation F-35A for $4 billion with delivery from 2023 to 2026 with an option for 32 more from 2027.

=== Romania ===
Romania decided to acquire used F-16s instead.

=== Slovakia ===
On 30 August 2014, the Czech Republic, Slovakia and Sweden signed a letter of intent agreeing to co-operate on using the Gripen, which would've lead to its acquisition by the Slovak Air Force. The letter of intent laid the foundation for bilateral co-operation around a common airspace surveillance of Slovakia and the Czech Republic. Slovakia sought to replace its MiG-29 fighters and the Gripen was reported as the aircraft of choice, although the requirement would go to open competition. Slovakia was deciding whether to lease fighters rather than buy, as did neighbouring Hungary and the Czech Republic.

In February 2018, the Slovak Ministry of Defence announced the launch of a new study to examine bids from the US and Swedish governments for the F-16V Viper and the Gripen to replace Slovak MiG-29s. On 11 July 2018, the Ministry of Defence announced that it would purchase 14 F-16V Block 70/72s instead of Gripen Cs. The F-16V package includes ammunition, training and logistics for a total of €1.589 billion (US$1.85 billion). Political opposition in Slovakia, among them former Defence Minister Ľubomír Galko, expressed criticism arguing that the deal lacked transparency. On 12 December 2018, Slovakia signed a contract to acquire 14 F-16 Block 70/72. Originally all were to be delivered by the end of 2023, but as of October 2026, all aircraft have been handed of to the Slovak Air Force, with 10 already in Slovakia, and the other still training at Morris Air National Guard Base expecting to arrive after completing their training.

=== Switzerland ===
In January 2008, the Swiss Defence Material Administration invited Gripen International to bid to replace the nation's F-5 fleet. Saab responded with an initial proposal on 2 July 2008; other contenders were the Dassault Rafale and Eurofighter Typhoon. On 30 November 2011, the Swiss government announced its decision to buy 22 Gripen NG aircraft for 3.1 billion Swiss francs. In 2012, a confidential report of the Swiss Air Force's 2009 tests of the three contenders was leaked, which had rated the Gripen as performing substantially below both the Rafale and the Eurofighter. The Gripen was assessed as satisfactory for reconnaissance but unsatisfactory for combat air patrol and strike missions. The JAS 39C/D was evaluated, while the Gripen NG was bid. The parliamentary security commission found that the Gripen offered the most risks, but voted to go ahead as it was the cheapest option. The Gripen was rated satisfactory for operational suitability and overall was rated satisfactory.

On 25 August 2012, the plan to order was confirmed by both Swedish and Swiss authorities. Deliveries were expected to run from 2018 to 2021 at a fixed price of CHF 3.126 billion (US$3.27 billion) including development costs, mission planning systems, initial spares and support, training, and certification; the Swedish government also guaranteed the price, performance and operational suitability. Eight JAS 39Cs and three JAS 39Ds were to be leased from 2016 to 2020 to train Swiss pilots and allow the F-5s to be retired. In 2013, Saab moved to increase Swiss industry offsets above 100% of the deal value after the Swiss parliament's upper house voted down the deal's financing. On 27 August 2013, the National Council's Security Commission approved the purchase, followed by the lower and upper houses of the parliament's approval in September 2013. Elements of the left and center of the political spectrum often criticized the Gripen as unnecessary and too expensive. On 18 May 2014, 53.4% of Swiss voters voted against the plan in a national referendum. Reportedly, objectors questioned the role of fighter aircraft in general, and the relevance of alternatives such as UAVs, surface-to-air missiles, or cyberwarfare capabilities.

In 2015, Switzerland was set to relaunch the F-5E/F, and now also F/A-18C/D, replacement programme; the Gripen was again considered the favourite. In March 2018, Swiss officials named contenders in its US$8 billion Air 2030 programme that includes not only combat aircraft but also ground-based air defense systems: the Gripen, Dassault Rafale, Eurofighter Typhoon, Boeing F/A-18E/F Super Hornet and Lockheed Martin F-35. In January 2019, Saab submitted a formal proposal for 30 to 40 Gripen Es to Armasuisse. It was due to perform evaluation flights for Swiss personnel at Payerne Air Base in June 2019. However, in June 2019, Saab did not participate at Payerne with the Gripen E because it was not considered ready to perform all tests.
