= Micael Johansson =

Swedish business executive, president and CEO of Saab AB

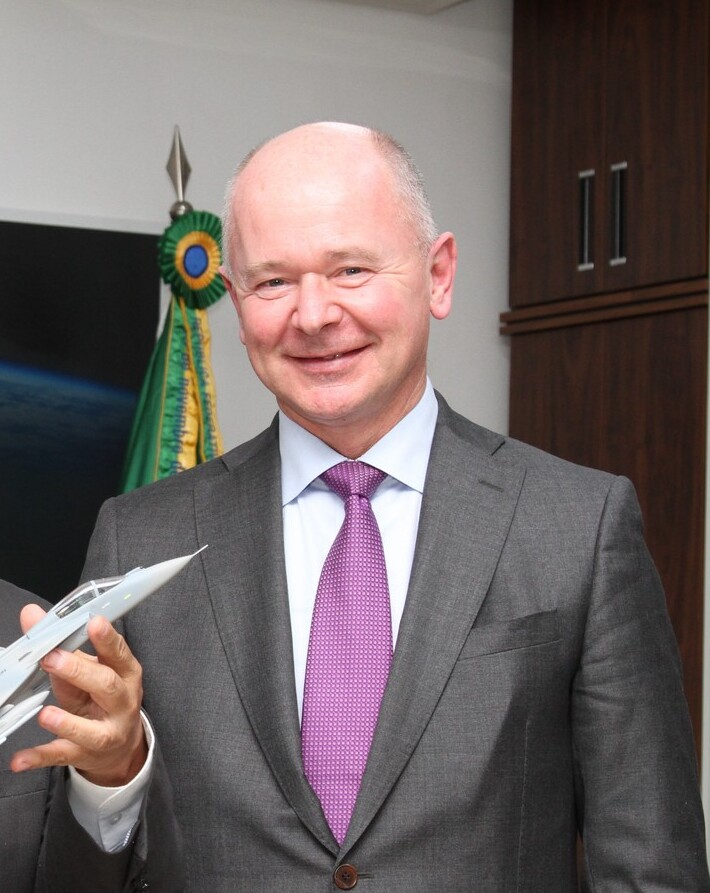
- Born: Bengt Micael Johansson; 6 October 1960 (age 66); Västerlövsta, Västmanland County, Sweden
- Education: Uppsala University (BSc, Mathematics and Computer Science)
- Occupation: Business executive
- Employer: Saab AB
- Known for: CEO of Saab AB
- Title: President and Chief Executive Officer of Saab AB
- Term: 2019–present
- Predecessor: Håkan Buskhe

Bengt Micael Johansson (born 6 October 1960) is a Swedish business executive who serves as the president and chief executive officer (CEO) of the Swedish defence and security company Saab AB. He succeeded Håkan Buskhe as CEO on 23 October 2019.

== Early life and education ==
Johansson was born in Västerlövsta Parish, Västmanland County, Sweden. He earned a bachelor's degree in mathematics and computer science from Uppsala University.

== Career ==
Johansson began his career at Saab in 1985 as a systems engineer, working initially with avionics and radar technologies. He subsequently held various management positions within Saab Avionics (formerly Ericsson Saab Avionics), and in 2008 he was appointed president of Saab Avitronics.

In January 2010, Johansson became senior vice president and head of Saab's business area Surveillance, which includes operations within radar, electronic warfare, command and control, and traffic management systems. Later, he served as senior executive vice president and deputy CEO of Saab before his appointment as president and CEO in October 2019.

Under Johansson's leadership, Saab has continued to expand its international operations and product portfolio, focusing on aeronautics, command and control, sensors, and advanced defense systems.

In 2023, Johansson became vice chairman of the Aerospace, Security and Defence Industries Association of Europe (ASD). In May 2025, he was elected president and chairman of the ASD Board for a two-year term, effective from 15 June 2025.

Johansson also serves as a director at Saab UK Ltd., a director of the European Business Leaders’ Convention, and formerly served as a director of Saab Australia Pty Ltd.

== See also ==
- Saab AB
- Swedish Armed Forces
