= Smith v Parsons =

South African legal case

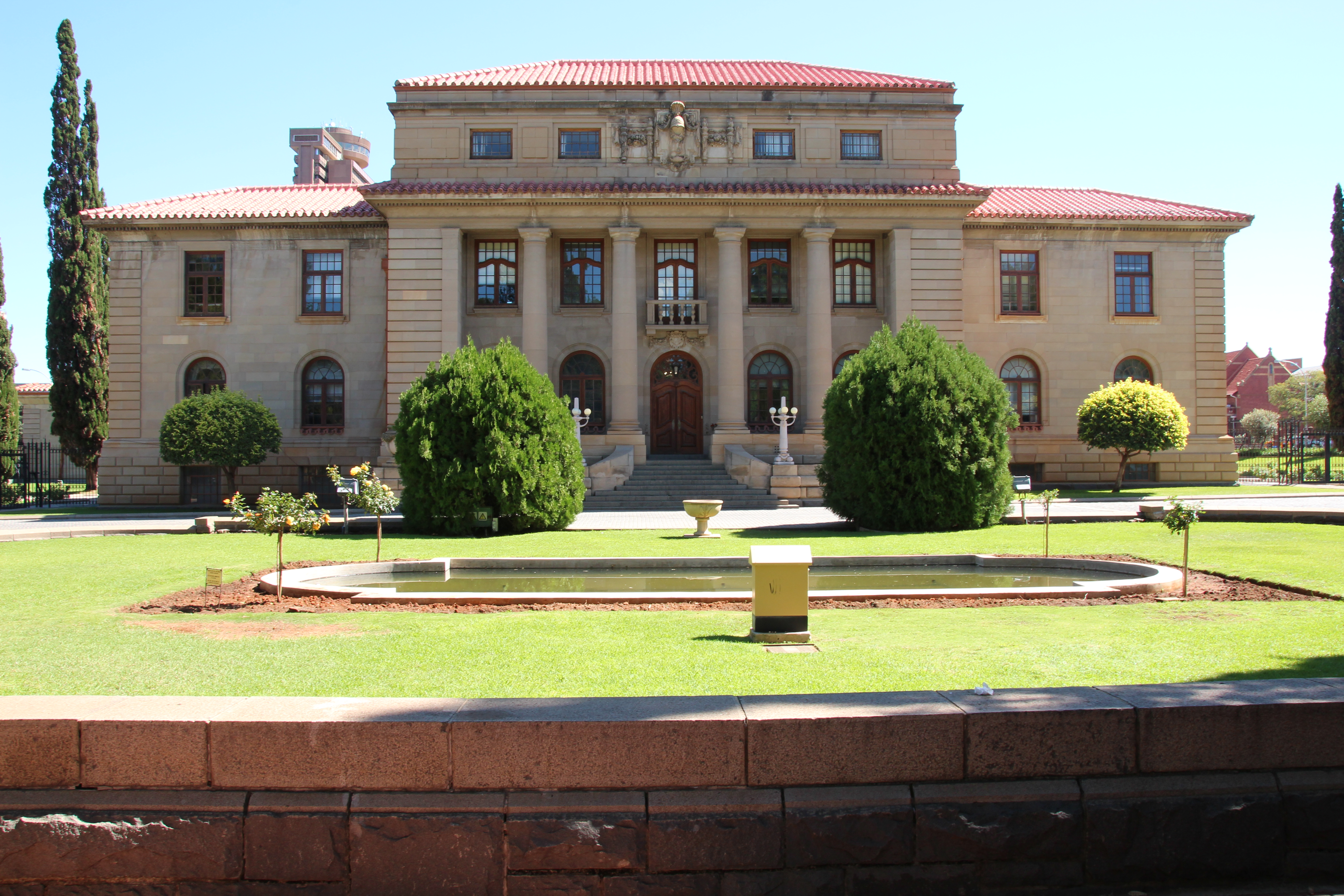
- Court: Supreme Court of Appeal (South Africa)
- Full case name: Smith v Parsons NO and Others
- Decided: 30 March 2010
- Docket nos.: 187/09
- Citations: [2010] ZASCA 39; [2010] 4 All SA 74 (SCA)

Case history
- Appealed from: Smith v Parsons NO and Others [2009] ZAKZHC 2 in the High Court of South Africa, Durban and Coast Local Division

Court membership
- Judges sitting: Lewis JA, Heher JA, Mhlantla JA, Leach JA and Seriti AJA

Case opinions
- Decision by: Seriti AJA (unanimous)

Keywords
- Suicide note; wills, amendment to; Wills Act, 1953

Smith v Parsons NO and Others is an important case in South African succession law, decided in the Supreme Court of Appeal in March 2010. It concerned the condonation of a suicide note as an amendment to the deceased's will.

== Background ==
The deceased, Walter Percival Smith, had validly executed a will in 2003 making his son, Jeremy Alan Smith, his sole heir. On 25 February 2007, he committed suicide, leaving a suicide note on the kitchen counter under a crucifix. The note was addressed to his girlfriend, Heather Wendy Smith. Part of it read:

Heather you can have this house, you will obviously? sell it and should meet all your future needs. Also I authorise Standard Bank to give you immediate access to Plusplan – there is R579,000.00 which will not leave you battling... There are also several thousand Rands in the bottom drawer of the safe... My will is in the Brown envelope in the safe. I leave everything else to Jeremy as stated therein.

Heather Smith applied to the High Court of South Africa for an order directing the Master of the High Court to accept the suicide note as a codicil to the will of the deceased. Her application was opposed by the son of the deceased. The High Court held that, although the deceased had written the note, he did not unequivocally intend the suicide note to amend his will. The applicant appealed to the Supreme Court of Appeal, where the matter was heard on 5 March 2010.

== Judgment ==
On 30 March 2010, Acting Judge of Appeal Willie Seriti delivered a unanimous judgment on behalf of the Supreme Court of Appeal. The court upheld the appeal, ordering that the suicide note should be accepted as an amendment to the deceased's will. The determination turned on the so-called condonation clause, section 2(3) of the Wills Act, 1953, which provided that an informally drafted document would be accepted as codicil to a deceased person's will if the document "was intended to be his will or an amendment of his will".

Seriti held that, based on the wording of the note and the surrounding circumstances, Walter Smith's suicide note constituted the deceased's "clear instruction" for the disposal of his estate. He pointed in particular to Smith's reference to his existing will, which demonstrated that "he was conscious of the fact that he had a will and that it did not make provision for the appellant, hence the instructions contained in the suicide note making provision for her." The court also dismissed the respondent's argument that the suicide note constituted a donatio mortis causa.

== See also ==
- South African succession law
