= Mandla Msomi =

South African politician

Member of the National Assembly
- In office May 1994 – April 2004
- Constituency: KwaZulu-Natal

Personal details
- Born: Mandla David Msomi; 25 December 1950 (age 75)
- Citizenship: South Africa
- Party: Inkatha Freedom Party

Mandla David Msomi (born 25 December 1950) is a South African politician and businessman. He represented the Inkatha Freedom Party (IFP) in the National Assembly from 1994 to 2004, and during that time he chaired the Portfolio Committee on Public Enterprises from 1994 to 1999.

== Legislative career: 1994–2004 ==
Msomi was first elected to the National Assembly in the 1994 general election. He was narrowly re-elected to a second term in the National Assembly in 1999, serving the KwaZulu-Natal constituency. During the first democratic Parliament from 1994 to 1999, Msomi chaired Parliament's Portfolio Committee on Public Enterprises, and he remained an ordinary member of the committee during his second term. He also chaired the Durban-based Empowerment Trust during his time in Parliament, until it was liquidated.

=== Dato Samsudin ===
In January 2001, the Mail & Guardian reported that Msomi, while chair of the public enterprises committee, had leaked confidential government information to Dato Samsudin, a Malaysian businessman with various South African interests, including in SMG Holdings and New Republic Bank. In 1998, Msomi had given Samsudin a government status report about the restructuring of state-owned enterprises; it was marked strictly confidential, though Msomi claimed that it had been in the public domain. Msomi had also reportedly provided Samsudin with advice about the progress of the government's privatisation programme, including suggesting that the New Republic Bank should install a privatisation advisor in the office of the Premier of KwaZulu-Natal. In addition, the Mail & Guardian claimed to have seen evidence that Samsudin had paid Msomi several hundred thousand rand in 1997 and 1998, which Msomi had not disclosed to Parliament's register of members' interests. The South African Communist Party called for Msomi to be investigated, and the IFP said that it would demand an explanation from Msomi.

=== Arms Deal ===
In July 2001, the Star reported that Msomi was among 30 politicians who had received discounts on luxury vehicles from a private company, Daimler-Benz Aerospace. Daimler-Benz had since been merged into European Aeronautic Defence and Space (EADS), which had benefitted from a subcontract in the controversial 1999 Arms Deal. In December 1998, while Msomi was chairperson of the public enterprises committee, EADS, via Daimler-Benz, had reportedly given Msomi a R20,000 discount on a Mitsubishi Colt bakkie and a R50,000 discount on a Mercedes-Benz E320. Two opposition parties, the United Democratic Movement and the Democratic Alliance, reported Msomi to Parliament's ethics committee, which launched an inquiry. The IFP effectively suspended Msomi with pay, assigning him to work at the party's headquarters in KwaZulu-Natal until the inquiry was concluded.

Msomi was accused of having contravened parliamentary rules by failing to disclose that he had received the discount from Daimler-Benz. He maintained his innocence, saying that no disclosure was required because the vehicles were bought second-hand and because the discount was not substantial. To broader concerns about a conflict of interest, Msomi said that he had bought the vehicles directly through Daimler-Benz, not through EADS. In late September 2002, the ethics committee dismissed the complaint against Msomi, finding that there was no evidence that Msomi had contravened the parliamentary ethics code, insofar as there was no evidence that he had received a benefit that required disclosure to Parliament.

In 2007, Patricia de Lille of the Independent Democrats revived the saga when she announced that she had laid criminal charges against Msomi and the other politicians who had received discounted vehicles. She pointed out that one of the 30 politicians, Tony Yengeni, had been convicted on related criminal charges, so it was "only proper for the other 29 to face the music". The IFP responded on Msomi's behalf in a statement, denying again that Msomi had acquired any undue benefit in the transaction and referring the press to the decision of the 2002 ethics inquiry.

== Later career ==
Msomi left Parliament after the 2004 general election. Richard Calland said it was clear that, due to parliamentary ethics investigations, he had been "prompted to fall on his sword" and withdraw from the IFP's party list. After leaving Parliament, he pursued his career in business.
