= Fana Hlongwane =

Fana Hlongwane is a South African businessman and 'fixer'. He is chiefly known for his association with the South African Arms Deal, when he was adviser to defence minister Joe Modise from 1995 to 1998.

His various companies, Ngwane Defence, Truvelo, Les Amis (Pty) Ltd, Hlongwane Consulting channelled around 200 million Rand from British Aerospace which are alleged to be bribes distributed around the ANC. Swedish authorities say that R24 million was paid to Hlongwane in 2003. Former British Aerospace project manager Bernard Collier paid R7 million in April 2007 to Hlongwane as a consultant via the company Ivema, itself 51% owned by Hlongwane through Ngwane Defence Holdings.
