= Willie Seriti =

South African judge

Judge of the Supreme Court of Appeal
- In office 4 December 2010 – 21 July 2019
- Appointed by: Jacob Zuma

Judge of the High Court
- In office 1 August 2003 – 3 December 2010
- Appointed by: Thabo Mbeki
- Division: Gauteng

Personal details
- Born: Legoabe Willie Seriti; 21 July 1949 (age 77) Pretoria, Transvaal; Union of South Africa
- Spouse: Nomvuyo Seriti
- Education: University of Fort Hare (BJuris); University of South Africa (LLB, LLM); Witwatersrand University (LLM); University of Pretoria (LLD)

Legoabe Willie Seriti (born 21 July 1949) is a South African retired judge who served in the Supreme Court of Appeal between 2010 and 2019. Before his elevation to that court, he was a judge of the Gauteng High Court from 2003 to 2010. He is best known for his role in the Seriti Commission of Inquiry into the Arms Deal, which he chaired between 2011 and 2015. He was formerly an attorney in his hometown of Pretoria.

== Early life and education ==
Seriti was born on 21 July 1949 in Pretoria, where he attended primary school. He matriculated at Setotolwane High School in Polokwane, Transvaal and went on to the University of Fort Hare, where he completed a BJuris in 1976.

In later years, while in active legal practice, he completed several postgraduate degrees: an LLB at the University of South Africa in 1985, an LLM at the University of the Witwatersrand in 1988, another LLM at the University of South Africa in 1992, and an LLD at the University of Pretoria in 1993.

== Legal career ==
After he graduated with his LLB, Seriti served his articles of clerkship and entered practice as an attorney in Pretoria. In 1978, inspired by the growth of black-owned law firms in apartheid South Africa, he co-founded the firm of Maluleke, Seriti & Moseneke with George Maluleke and Dikgang Moseneke. During his 26 years in practice, the firm became Seriti, Mavundla & Partners (with Ntendeya Moses Mavundla) and then Maluleke, Seriti, Matlala & Makume (with Maluleke, Nano Matlala, and Motsamai Makume).

Seriti served as the chairperson of both the Black Insolvency Practitioners and the Insolvency Practitioners of South Africa, and he was active in the Black Lawyers Association. In 1996, after the end of apartheid, he was appointed as the chairperson of Gauteng Province's Consumer Affairs Court, a newly established five-person tribunal dealing with consumer protection matters. In March 1998, he and Esmé du Plessis were appointed as the inaugural co-chairpersons of the new Law Society of South Africa. While he was holding that position, in 1999, he was investigated by the Transvaal Law Society on various disciplinary complaints, including several complaints related to alleged overcharging.

== Gauteng High Court: 2003–2010 ==
In April 2003, President Thabo Mbeki announced that, on the advice of the Judicial Service Commission, he had appointed Seriti as a judge of the Gauteng Division (then the Transvaal Division) of the High Court of South Africa. He joined the bench in Pretoria on 1 August 2003. Prominent matters heard by Seriti included the Waterkloof Four's unsuccessful application to appeal their murder convictions.

=== Other public service ===
While on the High Court bench, Seriti served as a member of the South African Law Reform Commission. He also served a term as the judge designated to approve communications interceptions under the Regulation of Interception of Communications and Provision of Communication-related Information Act. That period coincided with the highly sensitive wiretap that led to the so-called spy tapes, recorded in late 2007, which in turn led the National Prosecuting Authority to withdraw its corruption charges against President Jacob Zuma; however, Seriti later said that he could not recall whether he had authorised the wiretap in question.

In October 2009, President Zuma appointed Seriti as the chairperson of the Independent Commission for the Remuneration of Public Office Bearers. He served a full five-year term in that position before he was succeeded by Cagney Musi in October 2014.

=== Constitutional Court nomination ===
In September 2009, the Judicial Service Commission interviewed Seriti as a candidate for possible elevation to one of four vacant seats in the Constitutional Court of South Africa. During his interview, held in Soweto, Seriti was asked to explain why his CV did not disclose his tenure as an interceptions judge; he said that he had believed that such disclosure would be illegal. The Judicial Service Commission did not recommend him for elevation, and sources told News24 that he had been eliminated from the contest in the second of three rounds of voting by the Judicial Service Commission.

== Supreme Court of Appeal: 2010–2019 ==
A year after his Constitutional Court nomination, in October 2010, Seriti was shortlisted and interviewed for possible appointment to the Supreme Court of Appeal. Although the interview panel revealed that sitting Supreme Court justices had expressed concern about Seriti's candidacy, the Judicial Service Commission nonetheless recommended him for appointment. At the appointment of President Zuma, he joined the Supreme Court bench on 4 December 2010 alongside Steven Majiedt and Leona Theron.

In July 2019, Seriti reached the mandatory retirement age of 70.

== Arms Deal Commission ==
=== Inquiry proceedings ===
On 24 October 2011, President Zuma announced the establishment of a commission of inquiry tasked with allegations of fraud, corruption, impropriety and irregularity in the 1999 Strategic Defence Procurement Package, better known as the Arms Deal; he also named Seriti as the commission's chairperson. Better known as the Arms Procurement Commission, the Arms Deal Commission, or the Seriti Commission, the inquiry was wracked with high-profile resignations – including the resignation of two successive commissioners, judges Willem van der Merwe and Francis Legodi, before the commission even held its first hearings.

The commission ultimately sat as a two-man panel, composed of Seriti and judge Hendrick Musi, with its first hearings held in August 2013. After its term was repeatedly extended, it ultimately closed on 30 June 2015. By that time, several other employees of the commission had resigned; one of them, attorney Norman Moabi, accused Seriti of pursuing a "second agenda", and Seriti was also accused of nepotism in the administration of the commission. The final report of the commission was submitted to President Zuma on 30 December 2015.

=== Subsequent legal action ===
In August 2019, Judge President Dunstan Mlambo of the Gauteng High Court set aside the Seriti Commission's findings, on the basis that it had omitted to admit, interrogate and pursue relevant evidence and thus had failed to comprehensively investigate the matters set out in its terms of reference. The ruling was a result of a review application by Corruption Watch and Right2Know. In November 2021, more than two years after the judgement, Seriti and Musi applied to appeal the High Court's decision to overturn the commission's findings, saying that the judgement was being "used as a whip to harass us", but they were denied leave to appeal in September 2022.

Meanwhile, in 2021, the Judicial Conduct Committee of the Judicial Service Commission heard a complaint about alleged misconduct by Seriti and Musi during the course of the Seriti Commission. However, ahead of the JCC hearings, Seriti and Musi submitted a court application to halt the process, challenging the constitutionality of the provision of the Judicial Service Commission Act which allowed misconduct proceedings against retired judges, such as themselves; that application was dismissed in April 2023.

== Personal life ==
He is married to Nomvuyo Seriti, an attorney and businesswoman; they have three children.
