= Lumka Yengeni =

South African politician

High Commissioner of the Republic of South Africa to Jamaica
- Incumbent
- Assumed office 18 December 2018
- President: Cyril Ramaphosa

Member of the National Assembly
- In office 2004 – 2 October 2017

Personal details
- Born: Lumka Elizabeth Nyamza
- Citizenship: South Africa
- Party: African National Congress
- Spouse: Tony Yengeni

Lumka Elizabeth Yengeni (née Nyamza) is a South African politician who represented the African National Congress (ANC) in the National Assembly from 2004 to 2017. She resigned in October 2017 to take up her current position as South African High Commissioner to Jamaica, in which capacity she has been accredited since December 2018. She served on the ANC's National Executive Committee from 2007 to 2012.

== Early activism ==
During apartheid, Yengeni was a member of the South African Students' Organisation, a Black Consciousness organisation. She was imprisoned between 1976 and 1980 under the Internal Security Act and was arrested again, under the new Internal Security Act, in 1987.

== Legislative career: 2004–2017 ==
Yengeni joined the National Assembly in 2004 and was re-elected in the 2009 general election. From 2007 to 2012, she also served as a member of the ANC's National Executive Committee; she was elected to the body at the party's 52nd National Conference, ranked 31st of 80 ordinary members by number of votes received.

Pursuant to the 2014 general election, she was re-elected her legislative seat, ranked 74th on the ANC's national party list, and was also elected as Chairperson of the Portfolio Committee on Labour. She did not complete her third legislative term but instead resigned in October 2017 to undergo training as an ambassador-designate.

== Diplomatic career: 2018–present ==
In December 2018, Yengeni presented her credentials as South African High Commissioner to Jamaica, based in Kingston. As High Commissioner, she later gained non-resident accreditation to surrounding islands including Antigua and Barbuda, Saint Kitts and Nevis, and the Bahamas. She remained at the High Commission as of March 2023.

== Personal life ==
In the 1980s in Lusaka, Zambia, Yengeni married Tony Yengeni, then an Umkhonto we Sizwe commander and later an ANC parliamentarian. They have two adult children together and have been separated since 2011.
