= Tony Yengeni =

South African politician (born 1950)

Member of the National Assembly
- In office 9 May 1990 – 5 March 2003

Chief Whip of the Majority Party
- In office November 1998 – October 2001
- Speaker: Frene Ginwala
- Preceded by: Max Sisulu
- Succeeded by: Nosiviwe Mapisa-Nqakula

Second Deputy President of uMkhonto weSizwe Party
- Incumbent
- Assumed office October 2025

Personal details
- Born: Tony Sithembiso Yengeni; 11 October 1950 (age 76) Cape Town, Cape Province; Union of South Africa
- Party: African National Congress until 2025 uMkhonto weSizwe Party 2025-present
- Spouse: Lumka Yengeni (m. 1980)

Tony Sithembiso Yengeni (born 11 October 1954) is a South African politician and former anti-apartheid activist who currently serves Second Deputy President of the uMkhonto weSizwe Party (MKP). He represented the African National Congress (ANC) in the National Assembly from May 1994 to March 2003, including as Chief Whip of the Majority Party from November 1998 to October 2001. He was a member of the ANC National Executive Committee between 1994 and 2022, though he resigned from legislative politics after he was convicted of fraud in 2003.

Yengeni grew up on the Cape Flats but joined the ANC in 1976 and went into exile with the party's armed wing, Umkhonto we Sizwe. In 1986, he returned to South Africa as the commander of Umkhonto we Sizwe (MK)'s structures in Cape Town. He was detained for his activism between 1987 and 1991, awaiting trial on terrorism charges, but he was indemnified and released in March 1991 during the negotiations to end apartheid. After that, he was the regional secretary of the ANC in the Western Cape until the 1994 general election, when he was elected to the National Assembly.

In the National Assembly, before his appointment as Chief Whip, Yengeni chaired the Joint Standing Committee on Defence in the first democratic Parliament from 1994 to 1998. His activities in the committee gave rise to a criminal charge during investigations into alleged corruption in the Arms Deal. In 2003, he was found guilty of fraud. He was sentenced to four years in prison, but only served four months, for getting an unlawful discount on a Mercedes Benz he purchased.

== Early life and education ==
Yengeni was born on 11 October 1954 in Cape Town. He grew up in Gugulethu and Nyanga, both townships on the Cape Flats, and matriculated at Fort Beaufort College in Cape Town.

== Anti-apartheid activism ==
He entered anti-apartheid politics through the Black Consciousness Movement before joining the outlawed African National Congress (ANC) in 1976. He went into exile with the ANC in the Frontline States, receiving military training at Umkhonto we Sizwe (MK) camps in Lesotho, Botswana, Zambia, and Angola; he also travelled to Moscow in the Soviet Union to study for a social science diploma in 1982. He was later seconded to the South African Congress of Trade Unions in Lesotho, where he was regional secretary.

=== Detention and trial: 1986–1991 ===
In 1986, Yengeni returned to South Africa to lead the MK underground in Cape Town. The following year, in a crackdown on his MK network, Yengeni was arrested and detained indefinitely under Section 29 of the Internal Security Act. Awaiting trial in Pollsmoor Prison, he and the others mounted a hunger strike which received public attention, demanding improvements in detention conditions, including that they – the defendants – should not be held in racially segregated facilities.

In what became known as the Yengeni Trial or Rainbow Trial (for the racial diversity of the defendants), the state pursued terrorism charges – a step-down from the initial treason charges – against Yengeni and 13 others, including Jenny Schreiner and his own future wife. They were accused of planting two bombs (which had not harmed anyone) and illegal possession of firearms and explosives. The defendants exploited the prosecution for political purposes; for example, they refused to plead guilty or not guilty and instead entered a lengthy plea which reversed the charge of terrorism and treason against the state and ended with the statement, "Victory is certain. South Africa shall be free." In March 1991, during an adjournment of the trial and amid ongoing negotiations to end apartheid, Justice Minister Kobie Coetsee announced that Yengeni and the others had been indemnified and would be released.

=== Transitional ANC: 1991–1994 ===
By the time of Yengeni's release in 1991, the ANC had been unbanned by the apartheid government, and Yengeni became secretary of the party's new above-ground branch in the Western Cape. He became a popular figure in Western Cape politics, aligning himself with populist leaders like Winnie Mandela and Peter Mokaba and campaigning militantly for the ANC ahead of the 1994 general election.

== National Assembly ==
In the April 1994 general election, South Africa's first under universal suffrage, Yengeni was elected to represent the ANC in the National Assembly, the lower house of the new South African Parliament. He was also appointed as chairperson of Parliament's Joint Standing Committee on Defence. At the ANC's 49th National Conference in December 1994, Yengeni was elected for the first time to the ANC National Executive Committee. He served on the committee throughout his tenure in Parliament, gaining re-election in December 1997 and December 2002.

Also during this period, Yengeni gained national attention for his July 1997 appearance at the Truth and Reconciliation Commission, where he cross-examined Jeffrey Benzien, a former member of the South African Police, who had severely tortured him during his apartheid-era detention on terrorism charges. In a commission hearing, Yengeni asked Benzien to demonstrate the use of the "wet bag", a form of suffocation torture that Yengeni had been subjected to. Yengeni's comrade Mcebisi Skwatsha volunteered to act as the prisoner in the re-enactment. Later in the same hearing, Benzien accused Yengeni of having betrayed his ANC comrades, providing information about them under torture; Yengeni called this "bullshit".

In November 1998, the ANC promoted Yengeni to succeed Max Sisulu as the Chief Whip of the Majority Party in the National Assembly. He resigned from that office on 4 October 2001, the day after he was arrested and charged with corruption. He remained an ordinary Member of Parliament until 5 March 2003, when he resigned from his seat after his fraud conviction; his resignation followed reports that he had been encouraged to step down both by the Speaker of the National Assembly, Frene Ginwala, and by the ANC secretary-general, Kgalema Motlanthe.

== Arms Deal conviction ==
Yengeni was arrested in October 2001 and released on bail of R10 000 during an investigation by then National Director of Public Prosecutions, Bulelani Ngcuka, into allegations of misuse of power by Yengeni and Jacob Zuma. According to the Sunday Times, EADS admitted that the company "helped" approximately 30 South African officials to obtain luxury vehicles. Yengeni was specifically charged with defrauding parliament by accepting a discount on a luxury car during the tendering process for a controversial arms deal while he was the member of a parliamentary committee reporting on the same deal. Yengeni pleaded "not guilty" and placed full-page advertisements proclaiming his innocence in all the Sunday newspapers (except The Sunday Times). This was estimated to have cost the chief whip R250,000. Member of Parliament suggested that Yengeni was being offered up as a scapegoat for the arms deal scandal, so that others could avoid being charged.

Yengeni eventually entered into a plea agreement in which various corruption charges were dismissed in exchange for his pleading guilty to one count of fraud. In March 2003, the court entered a conviction against Yengeni for fraud and sentenced him to four years in prison.

=== Imprisonment ===
After failed appeals, Yengeni entered Pollsmoor Prison near Cape Town on 24 August 2006, was immediately transferred to more modern Malmesbury prison.

Yengeni was released on parole on 15 January 2007, after completing a mere four months of the four-year sentence. Senior Western Cape ANC leaders, including Mcebisi Skwatsha, were present at his release. He continued to maintain his innocence, saying that prison was "a place that I was not supposed to be in the first place".

=== Aftermath ===
In 2010, it came to light that Yengeni had failed, as required by the Companies Act, to inform the registration office of his fraud conviction, and had failed to remove himself as a director of registered companies. Yengeni was sued and had to withdraw as a director from six companies.

In 2013, additional documents came to light showing Yengeni's deeper involvement in the arms deal.

== Later political career ==
Upon his release from prison, Yengeni was expected immediately to resume his political activities, with the ANC saying that he had served his suspension from the party and would "be able to continue his contribution to building a united, democratic, non-racial and non-sexist society". Indeed, even while in prison, Yengeni had accepted social visits from Jacob Zuma and Tokyo Sexwale, both of whom presumably sought his help lobbying support in the Western Cape for their respective presidential campaigns. As expected, Yengeni publicly endorsed Zuma's presidential bid, saying that, "He is a seasoned revolutionary and although he's not an angel, he has the gravitas, experience and intelligence to unite the organisation [the ANC]."

At the ANC's 52nd National Conference, held in Polokwane in December 2007, Zuma was elected as ANC president, and Yengeni was re-elected to the party's 80-member National Executive Committee in 21st place. He was also elected to a five-year term on the influential National Working Committee. Over the next decade, he was re-elected to two further terms on the National Executive Committee, ranked 65th of 80 at the 53rd National Conference in December 2012 and ranked 50th of 80 at the 54th National Conference in December 2017. However, he tempered his support for Zuma, and by 2012 was believed to be actively working against Zuma's re-election bid. On one ANC meeting in June 2012, Yengeni reportedly verbally attacked Blade Nzimande during a heated argument about Zuma's leadership.

In December 2017, Zuma was succeeded as ANC president by his deputy, Cyril Ramaphosa, and Yengeni became a vocal critic of Ramaphosa in subsequent years, calling for him to step down over the Phala Phala scandal and openly opposing his re-election bid in 2022. Also in 2022, the ANC's Electoral Commission announced that Yengeni himself would not be eligible to stand for re-election to the National Executive Committee, because his fraud conviction disqualified him under the new step-aside rule. Yengeni successfully appealed the decision, arguing that his criminal record had been expunged, but he was nonetheless dropped from the National Executive Committee at the ANC's 55th National Conference in December 2022, having failed to gain sufficient nominations to appear on the ballot paper.

In October 2025, Yengeni joined the uMkhonto weSizwe party as second deputy president.

== Drunk driving charges ==
In November 2007, Yengeni was arrested near Goodwood, Cape Town on suspicion of drunk driving, which would constitute a violation of his parole conditions. Yengeni said that he had only consumed flu medication. The case could not proceed because the blood sample was unfit to be taken for chemical analysis. This was because former Goodwood station commander, Siphiwo Hewana, allegedly gave an unknown person access to the blood sample. On 30 November 2009, in connection with this saga, Hewana was convicted of attempting to defeat the ends of justice. During Hewana's trial, Constable Charles Japhta alleged that Hewana told him he had instructions from Western Cape provincial police commissioner Mzwandile Petros to change statements on the docket relating to the time that Yengeni had been arrested. Hewana also said Yengeni's parole conditions had banned him from being out on the streets after 10pm, nor was he permitted to consume liquor, whereas Yengeni had been pulled off the road about midnight. Hewana testified that he had been ordered by the commissioner of police in the Western Cape to make the changes.

Yengeni was arrested for drunk driving again on 12 August 2013, this time in Green Point, and he was convicted in March 2017.

== Personal life ==
In 1984, Yengeni married Lumka Nyamza in Lusaka, Zambia. They have two adult children together and have been separated since 2011.

In January 2007, days after Yengeni's release from prison, the Society for the Prevention of Cruelty to Animals said that it was investigating Yengeni for criminal animal cruelty on the grounds that his post-release celebrations had apparently included stabbing a bull with a spear before it was slaughtered. The Cultural, Religion and Linguistic Rights Commission defended Yengeni, saying that his actions were part of a cleansing ritual and therefore constitutionally protected.
