= Håkan Buskhe =

Swedish businessman

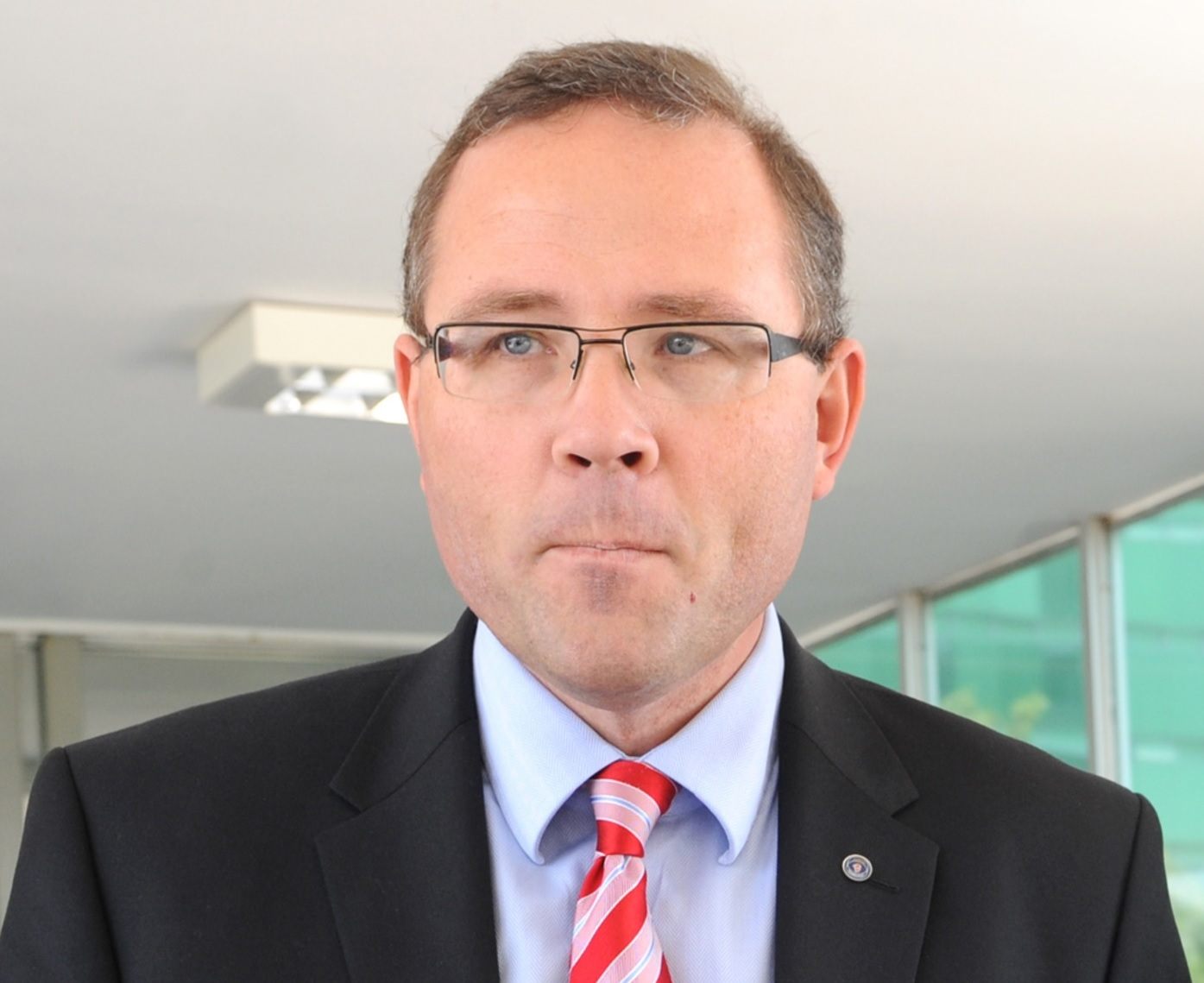
- Born: Kurt Ove Håkan Buskhe; 8 November 1963 (age 62); Örnsköldsvik, Sweden
- Education: Chalmers University of Technology
- Occupations: President and CEO, Saab

Kurt Ove Håkan Buskhe (born 8 November 1963 in Örnsköldsvik) is a Swedish businessman, better known as the president and CEO of the Swedish aerospace and defence company Saab Group, a role he has been in since September 2010.

Buskhe resigned from his role at SAAB in August 2019. He will leave the company before February 2020.

In addition to this role, he is also the chairman of the board of directors of Sweden’s state-owned logistics and transport company Green Cargo.

== Early life ==
Buskhe was born in 1963 in the north-east of Sweden, in Örnsköldsvik. He attended Chalmers University of Technology, where he earned a Master of Science degree in science and engineering, as well as a licentiate in engineering, and a diploma in corporate management.

== Career ==
He began his career in the military, carrying out military service during the 1980s, where he worked as a weapons technician. This gave him a basic initiation into the world of arms and defence, the only such experience he would later take into his role at Saab. His first real career move was at a logistics company called Scansped where he joined in 1988 as assistant to the managing director. He rose through the ranks of this company and became head of EDP in 1990, where he was responsible for the implementation of a transport administration IT system across Europe.

In 1994, he moved to Carlsberg, serving in various key senior logistics roles before he moved on to the electrical wholesale company Storel in 1998, where he eventually became managing director. In 2002, he became the CEO of logistics firm Schenker North, where he later became a board member in 2005.

In 2006, Bushke joined the German energy company E.ON’s Swedish division, E.ON Sverige, where he served as senior vice president before being appointed as president and CEO of the entire Nordic region. It was his successful time here that made his reputation as future candidate for Saab’s leadership.

In September 2010, Bushke was appointed as CEO of Saab Group, with the chairman Marcus Wallenberg choosing him for his breadth of expertise and focus on the high-tech field.

== Personal life ==
Bushke is married with three daughters. The oldest daughter Katrine (b. 1988) lives in Gothenburg.
