= Tati Makgoka =

South African judge

The Honourable Tati Makgoka

Judge of the Supreme Court of Appeal
- Incumbent
- Assumed office 1 June 2018
- Appointed by: Cyril Ramaphosa

Judge of the High Court
- In office 26 August 2009 – 31 May 2018
- Appointed by: Jacob Zuma
- Division: Gauteng

Personal details
- Born: Tati Moffat Makgoka; 13 February 1968 (age 58) Moletši, Transvaal; South Africa
- Education: University of the North; University of South Africa

Tati Moffat Makgoka (born 13 February 1968) is a South African judge of the Supreme Court of Appeal. Formerly an attorney in Pretoria, he served in the Gauteng High Court from August 2009 until June 2018, when he was elevated to the Supreme Court of Appeal. He was an acting judge in the Constitutional Court in 2023.

== Early life and education ==
Makgoka was born on 13 February 1968 in Moletši outside Polokwane in the former Northern Transvaal (now Limpopo Province). He matriculated at Hwiti High School and went on to the University of the North, where he completed a BProc in 1992. 30 years later, in 2021 and while serving as a judge, he also completed an LLB at the University of South Africa.

== Legal practice ==
After graduating from the University of the North, Makgoka served his articles of clerkship at a firm in Pretoria. Thereafter, between 1994 and 2009, he practised as an attorney in Pretoria. He acted as a judge in the High Court of South Africa in 2007, sitting in the Transvaal Provincial Division.

== Gauteng High Court: 2009–2018 ==
On 26 August 2009, Makgoka joined the High Court permanently when he was appointed as a judge of the Gauteng High Court. Notable judgements handed down by Makgoka included a judgement confirming that Harmony Gold and other mining companies were obligated to rehabilitate environmental damage produced by corporate pollution. His order in that matter was upheld by the Supreme Court of Appeal in Harmony Gold v Free State Department of Water Affairs. In October 2013, Makgoka ordered Legal Aid to provide legal representation at the Farlam Commission to mineworkers who had been injured or arrested during the Marikana massacre.

During his nearly nine years in the High Court, Makgoka was seconded to appellate courts three times. He was an acting judge in the Labour Appeal Court from June to November 2015 and in the Supreme Court of Appeal on two occasions, from June to November 2016 and then from October 2017 to May 2018. During that period, he wrote the Supreme Court of Appeal's judgement in a vicarious liability matter. He also acted in the Constitutional Division of the Lesotho High Court in April 2015.

== Supreme Court of Appeal: 2018–present ==
In April 2018, Makgoka was one of nine candidates whom the Judicial Service Commission shortlisted and interviewed for possible permanent appointment to one of three vacancies in the Supreme Court of Appeal. During his interview, he was asked about his impression of the level of collegiality in the Supreme Court of Appeal, and he expressed his support for gender-based affirmative action in the judiciary. The Judicial Service Commission recommended him for appointment, alongside Mahube Molemela and Ashton Schippers, and the trio joined the bench on 1 June 2018.

In November 2022, Makgoka wrote the court's unanimous judgement in the controversial matter of the parole of former President Jacob Zuma, who had been imprisoned for contempt of court. Makgoka's judgement said that Arthur Fraser, the National Commissioner for Correctional Services, had acted unlawfully and irrationally in granting Zuma medical parole; the court ordered that Zuma should return to prison to serve out his sentence.

Between February and May 2023, Makgoka was an acting judge in the Constitutional Court of South Africa. He wrote the court's judgement in N.O. v Minister of Police, which overturned a Supreme Court of Appeal ruling on the application of the "once-and-for-all" rule for claiming damages.

== Public service ==
Makgoka was highly involved in judicial education and training, including through the Legal Education Centre of the Black Lawyers Association, and he serves on the editorial committee of the South African Institute of Judicial Education Journal. He has been the chancellor of the Anglican Diocese of Pretoria since 2012 and a member of the advisory board of Judges to the World Intellectual Property Organisation since 2020. Since 2019, he has been a member of the Judicial Conduct Committee of the Judicial Service Commission, in which capacity he served on the three-member tribunal that found Western Cape Judge President John Hlophe guilty of gross misconduct for attempting to improperly influence the views of Justices Chris Jafta and Bess Nkabinde.

== Personal life ==
Makgoka is a widower and has two children.
