= Johan Conradie =

South African judge (born 1939)

Judge of the Supreme Court of Appeal
- In office 1 June 2002 – 2007
- Appointed by: Thabo Mbeki

Judge of the Supreme Court
- In office 1987 – 31 May 2002
- Appointed by: P. W. Botha
- Division: Western Cape

Personal details
- Born: Johannes Hendrik Conradie; 15 June 1938 (age 88) Johannesburg, Transvaal; Union of South Africa
- Citizenship: South Africa
- Education: Helpmekaar Kollege
- Alma mater: University of the Witwatersrand

Johannes Hendrik Conradie (born 15 June 1939) is a South African retired judge who served in the Supreme Court of Appeal from 2002 to 2007. He joined the bench in 1987 as a judge of the Supreme Court's Cape Division, later the Cape High Court. Before that, he was a practising silk in Johannesburg.

== Early life and education ==
Conradie was born on 15 June 1938 in Johannesburg. He attended Laerskool Jan Celliers and Helpmekaar High School, matriculating in 1956. After one year of undergraduate study in Switzerland at the University of Basel, he enrolled at the University of the Witwatersrand, where he completed a BA in 1959 and an LLB cum laude in 1963.

== Legal career ==
Conradie was admitted as an advocate in 1964 and practised law at the Johannesburg Bar for the next 23 years, taking silk in 1982. He was an acting judge in the Supreme Court of South Africa in 1984 and 1985.

== Judicial career ==
In 1987, he was permanently appointed to the bench as a judge of the Supreme Court's Cape Division. He served in that court (which later became a division of the High Court of South Africa) until 1 June 2002, when he was elevated to the Supreme Court of Appeal; he was appointed to the appellate court by President Thabo Mbeki on the advice of the Judicial Service Commission. He retired in 2007.
