= Trevor Gorven =

South African judge

The Honourable Trevor Gorven

Judge of the Supreme Court of Appeal
- In office 1 July 2021 – 21 April 2024
- Appointed by: Cyril Ramaphosa

Judge of the High Court
- In office 17 December 2008 – 30 June 2021
- Appointed by: Kgalema Motlanthe
- Division: KwaZulu-Natal

Personal details
- Born: Trevor Richard Gorven; 21 April 1954 (age 72)
- Education: University of Natal

Trevor Richard Gorven (born 21 April 1954) is a South African retired judge who served in the Supreme Court of Appeal between July 2021 and April 2024. Before his elevation to that court, he served in the KwaZulu-Natal High Court from December 2008 to June 2021. He was formerly an advocate in Pietermaritzburg, primarily practising civil litigation, and he received silk status in 2006.

== Early life and education ==
Gorven was born on 21 April 1954. He matriculated in 1971 at Northlands Boys High School in Durban and went on to the University of Natal, where he completed a BA at the Durban campus in 1976 and an LLB at the Pietermaritzburg campus in 1978. He subsequently pursued study in theology, earning a theology certificate from St Johns College in Nottingham in 1985 and then a BTh from the University of South Africa in 1986. He also holds certificates in labour law and constitutional litigation from the University of Natal.

== Legal practice ==
Gorven was admitted as an advocate in August 1979, and, after his theological training and a stint as a prosecutor, he began practising at the Pietermaritzburg Bar in 1988. He practised there for two decades thereafter, specialising primarily in civil litigation, and he took silk in February 2006. Between 2006 and 2008, he served on several occasions as an acting judge in the KwaZulu-Natal Division of the High Court of South Africa. He was also active in the governance and mentorship programmes of the local and provincial bar.

== KwaZulu-Natal High Court: 2008–2021 ==
In October 2008, Gorven was one of ten candidates whom the Judicial Service Commission interviewed for possible permanent appointment to one of five vacancies in the KwaZulu-Natal High Court. He was recommended for appointment and joined the bench on 17 December 2008. Among his prominent judgements in the High Court was Booysen v Acting National Director of Public Prosecutions and Others, in which he set aside racketeering charges against Johan Booysen, the suspended head of the KwaZulu-Natal Hawks. The judgement was noted for its harsh criticism of Nomgcobo Jiba, the acting National Director of Public Prosecutions, whose actions Gorven said failed to pass "even... the least stringent test for rationality imaginable".

Between June 2014 and June 2021, Gorven served several lengthy stints as an acting judge in the Supreme Court of Appeal, including for a full year from June 2014 to May 2015 and for ten months from December 2016 to September 2017. By 2021, 18 of his 53 reported judgements had been written at the Supreme Court of Appeal. On four different occasions, he was shortlisted and unsuccessfully interviewed for permanent elevation to the Supreme Court: in April 2015, April 2016, April 2018, and April 2019.

== Supreme Court of Appeal: 2021–2024 ==
In February 2021, the Judicial Service Commission announced that Gorven had been shortlisted for the Supreme Court of Appeal for a fifth time, this time as one of eleven candidates for appointment to five vacancies. He was nominated by Andrea Gabriel, a prominent KwaZulu-Natal advocate, who highlighted his contributions to training and mentorship. The interview was held in April 2021 and lasted only 30 minutes, with Supreme Court President Mandisa Maya thanking Gorven for succumbing to "pressure from colleagues" to make himself available for a fifth time.

He was among the five candidates whom the Judicial Service Commission recommended for appointment, and President Cyril Ramaphosa appointed him to the Supreme Court bench with effect from 1 July 2021. He retired from the court upon his 70th birthday in 2024.

== Personal life ==
He is married to Melanie Jane Gorven, with whom he has two daughters. He has been a lay preacher in the Anglican Church of South Africa since 1989, and he is also a director of the Duzi uMngeni Conservation Trust, a non-profit group supporting the health of the Msunduzi and Umngeni rivers which he co-founded in 2006.

During his youth, Gorven was active in YMCA South Africa, which he represented at the 1981 World Council of YMCAs in Colorado; he was a founding member of the YCMA Joint Task Group for Action against Apartheid between 1987 and 1991. He was a member of the council of St Nicholas Diocesan School from 1999 to 2016, and a member of the board of governors of the Epworth School from 2005 to 2011.
