= Daisy Molefe =

South African judge (born 1957)

The Honourable Daisy Molefe

Judge of the Supreme Court of Appeal
- Incumbent
- Assumed office 1 December 2022
- Appointed by: Cyril Ramaphosa

Judge of the High Court
- In office 1 July 2013 – 30 November 2022
- Appointed by: Jacob Zuma
- Division: Gauteng

Personal details
- Born: 26 October 1956 (age 69) Phokeng, Transvaal; Union of South Africa
- Education: University of the North

Daisy Sekao Molefe (born 26 October 1957) is a South African judge of the Supreme Court of Appeal. Formerly a commercial lawyer, she was a judge of the Gauteng High Court from July 2013 until December 2022, when she was appointed to the Supreme Court of Appeal.

== Early life and education ==
Molefe was born on 26 October 1957 in Phokeng, a town outside Rustenberg; governed under Bophuthatswana during apartheid, Phokeng later became part of the North West Province. Molefe matriculated at Moroka High School in Thaba Nchu and studied law at the University of the North, where she completed a BProc in 1982 and an LLB in 1984.

== Career in commercial law ==
After graduating, Molefe worked as a lecturer at the University of the North West until 1986, when she joined Edward Nathan & Friedland as a candidate attorney. She was admitted as an attorney in the Transvaal High Court the following year. In 1988, she and Hlelephi Matolo-Dlepu, another black woman attorney, founded Molefe-Dlepu Attorneys, which specialised in commercial law; she worked there in private practice for the next 25 years.

During this period, Molefe developed a specialty in corporate governance: she served as an independent chairperson on various entities, including the tender board of Transnet Group, the appeals committee of the Private Security Industry Regulatory Authority, and a commission of inquiry into fatal accidents at Spoornet. She also served as an expert assessor in criminal cases, as the regional director of Lawyers for Human Rights in Johannesburg from 1988 to 1992, and as a lecturer at the Law Society's School of Law from 1995 to 2010. She was an acting judge in the High Court of South Africa in 2012, first in the Free State Division and then in the Gauteng Division.

== Gauteng High Court: 2013–2022 ==
In April 2013, the Judicial Service Commission recommended Molefe for permanent appointment to the Gauteng High Court in Pretoria. President Jacob Zuma confirmed her appointment the following month, and she joined the bench on 1 July.

During her nine years in Pretoria, Molefe's significant judgements included her 2019 ruling in favour of the Economic Freedom Fighters (EFF) in South African National Editors' Forum v EFF, in which the South African National Editors' Forum and five prominent journalists – Adriaan Basson of News24, Pauli van Wyk of the Daily Maverick, Ranjeni Munusamy of Tiso Blackstar, Barry Bateman of Eyewitness News, and Max du Preez of the Vrye Weekblad – attempted to interdict the EFF, its leader Julius Malema, and its supporters from harassing journalists on public and social media platforms. Presiding in the Equality Court, Molefe agreed with the EFF's counsel, Tembeka Ngcukaitobi, that journalists did not qualify for legal protections against discriminatory hate speech. She also received media attention for a 2022 ruling in which she interdicted the Daily News from reporting on a leaked State Security Agency document.

While in Gauteng, Molefe served as an acting judge in the Land Claims Court between 2017 and 2020 (including as the court's acting judge president in 2019); as an acting judge in the Labour Appeal Court in 2021; and as an acting judge in the Supreme Court of Appeal on three different occasions between June 2021 and September 2022. As an acting judge, she wrote the Supreme Court of Appeal's unanimous judgement in National Director of Public Prosecutions (Ex Parte), which affirmed the urgency of asset preservation orders issued in terms of the Prevention of Organised Crime Act.

== Supreme Court of Appeal: 2022–present ==
In October 2022, the Judicial Service Commission interviewed Molefe as a candidate for permanent appointment to the Supreme Court of Appeal. She was the least experienced of the 11 candidates interviewed, and acting President Xola Petse was critical of Molefe during the interview, saying that she was "consistently... not at court and no one knew your whereabouts" and that her draft judgements needed to be "knocked into good shape". Nonetheless, Molefe was one of five candidates whom the Judicial Service Commission recommended for appointment, and she joined the Supreme Court of Appeal on 1 December 2022.

== Personal life ==
She is married to Christopher Molefe and has two children.
