= Wendy Hughes (judge) =

South African judge (born 1968)

The Honourable Wendy Hughes

Judge of the Supreme Court of Appeal
- Incumbent
- Assumed office 1 July 2021
- Appointed by: Cyril Ramaphosa

Judge of the High Court
- In office 1 July 2013 – 30 June 2021
- Appointed by: Jacob Zuma
- Division: Gauteng

Personal details
- Born: 28 February 1968 (age 58) Natal, South Africa
- Education: University of Durban–Westville

Wendy Hughes (born 28 February 1968), formerly known as Wendy Hughes-Madondo, is a South African judge of the Supreme Court of Appeal. Formerly an attorney in private practice, she was a judge of the Gauteng High Court from July 2013 until July 2021, when she was appointed to the Supreme Court of Appeal.

== Early life and education ==
Hughes was born on 28 February 1968 in present-day KwaZulu-Natal. She matriculated at Wentworth Senior Secondary School in Durban and attended the University of Durban–Westville, where she completed a BProc in 1993 and an LLB in 1996. Later, in 1999, she received an advanced diploma in labour law from the Rand Afrikaans University.

== Career as an attorney ==
Hughes was an articled clerk at Mlaba Makhaye and Partners in Durban between 1993 and 1995, and she was admitted as an attorney in December 1995. In 1996, she joined Kruger Ngcobo, a KwaZulu-Natal-based firm, where she worked for five years. She left to become the sole director of her own firm, Hughes-Madondo Incorporated, which she ran between 2001 and 2013. During this period, from 1999 to 2005, she was also a part-time commissioner at the Commission for Conciliation, Mediation and Arbitration in KwaZulu-Natal.

Between June 2008 and June 2009, Hughes completed the Aspirant Women Judges Programme, which aimed to elevate women to the bench of the High Court of South Africa. After that, she was invited to act as a judge in the High Court on several occasions – in the KwaZulu-Natal Division in 2009, in the Northern Cape Division between 2010 and 2012, and in the Gauteng Division between 2012 and 2013.

== Gauteng High Court: 2013–2021 ==
In April 2013, the Judicial Service Commission recommended Hughes for permanent appointment to the Gauteng High Court. President Jacob Zuma confirmed her appointment the following month, and she joined the bench on 1 July 2013. Hughes presided in Centre for Child Law v Media 24 Limited, a 2017 case concerning Zephany Nurse which later went to the Constitutional Court; the Constitutional Court upheld her interpretation of the Criminal Procedure Act's requirements for protecting the anonymity of child victims. Hughes also presided in prominent cases concerning the extension of the Zondo Commission and Nkosana Makate's protracted battle with Vodacom over compensation for the "Please Call Me" concept.

While serving in Gauteng, Hughes was an acting judge in the Constitutional Division of the High Court of Lesotho in April 2015, and she was an acting judge in the Supreme Court of Appeal on two occasions between December 2017 and November 2019. In the latter capacity, she wrote the Supreme Court's 2018 judgement in the matter of Director of Public Prosecutions, Grahamstown v Peli, which dealt with the adjudication of mitigating circumstances in the sentencing of rape.

== Supreme Court of Appeal: 2021–present ==
In February 2021, the Judicial Service Commission shortlisted Hughes for permanent appointment to one of five vacancies on the Supreme Court of Appeal. The General Council of the Bar recommended against her appointment, submitting comments that were highly critical of the quality of her writing. However, one of the Bar's representatives on the Judicial Service Commission, Dali Mpofu, defended Hughes during her interview in April 2021. Judge President Mandisa Maya was also complimentary, telling the Commission that Hughes had maintained her work ethic as an acting Supreme Court judge even after both of her parents fell fatally ill.

The Judicial Service Commission recommended Hughes for appointment. She served a final acting stint on the Supreme Court in June 2021 before beginning her permanent tenure on 1 July 2021.
