= Ian van der Merwe =

South African judge

The Honourable Ian van der Merwe

Judge of the Supreme Court of Appeal
- Incumbent
- Assumed office 1 July 2016
- Appointed by: Jacob Zuma

Judge of the High Court
- In office 1 August 2003 – 30 June 2016
- Appointed by: Thabo Mbeki
- Division: Free State Division

Personal details
- Born: Christiaan Hendrik Gert van der Merwe; 29 July 1954 (age 71) Frankfort, Orange Free State; Union of South Africa
- Education: Grey College, Bloemfontein
- Alma mater: University of the Free State; University of South Africa

Christiaan Hendrik Gert van der Merwe (born 29 July 1954) is a South African judge of the Supreme Court of Appeal. Before his elevation to that court, he served in the Free State High Court from August 2003 to June 2016. He began his career as a public prosecutor and practised in the Free State as an advocate between 1981 and 2003, gaining silk status in 1994.

== Early life and education ==
Van der Merwe was born on 29 July 1954 in Frankfort in the former Orange Free State (now the Free State). His home language was Afrikaans. He matriculated at Grey College in Bloemfontein in 1972 and went on to the University of the Free State, where he completed a BJuris in 1976; he then completed an LLB at the University of South Africa in 1978.

== Legal practice ==
After graduating, van der Merwe served two years at the National Prosecuting Authority in Bloemfontein, where he was a state advocate between 1978 and 1980. In 1981, he was admitted as an advocate, and he practised at the Free State Bar for over two decades thereafter, gaining silk status in March 1994. He served on the Free State Bar Council between 1990 and 2003, including as its chairperson for the last three of those years.

== Free State High Court: 2003–2016 ==
On 1 August 2003, van der Merwe joined the bench of the Free State Division of the High Court of South Africa. During his nearly 13 years in that court, he was seconded for two non-consecutive years to the Supreme Court of Appeal, where he was an acting judge from December 2012 to November 2013 and then from December 2014 to November 2015.

In April 2014, van der Merwe was one of seven candidates whom the Judicial Service Commission shortlisted and interviewed for possible permanent appointment to one of three vacancies in the Supreme Court of Appeal, but his interview was unsuccessful.

== Supreme Court of Appeal: 2016–present ==
Two years later, in April 2016, van der Merwe was shortlisted and interviewed again for new vacancies at the Supreme Court of Appeal. His friendly and brief 20-minute interview began with Supreme Court President Lex Mpati disclosing that he had bought cattle from van der Merwe. He had been nominated to the shortlist by the law faculty and dean of his alma mater, the University of the Free State, and his application emphasised his commercial law expertise. However, some commentators were concerned that his contributions to jurisprudence had been sparse, and advocacy groups pointed to a prior judgement in which they argued he had been unduly lax in sentencing a rapist.

Nonetheless, the Judicial Service Commission recommended van der Merwe for appointment, which was later confirmed by President Jacob Zuma. He joined the bench on 1 July 2016 alongside Connie Mocumie. He was the first Afrikaner to join the court since the retirement of Justice Fritz Brand.

== Personal life ==
During his career as an advocate, van der Merwe chaired the disciplinary committee of the Free State Rugby Union, and he later served as chairperson of the governing body of his high school, Grey College, between 2004 and 2007. In March 2007, he joined the council of his alma mater, the University of the Free State, and between 2010 and 2016, he served two terms as chairperson of the council. During his tenure, the council adopted a new language policy, which included a commitment to multilingualism as well as to English as the primary medium of instruction.

He is married to Tronel van der Merwe and has three children.
