= Dumisani Zondi =

South African judge (born 1957)

The Honourable Dumisani Zondi

Deputy President of the Supreme Court of Appeal
- Incumbent
- Assumed office 10 July 2024
- Appointed by: Cyril Ramaphosa
- President: Mahube Molemela
- Preceded by: Xola Petse

Chairperson of the Electoral Court
- Incumbent
- Assumed office December 2022

Judge of the Supreme Court of Appeal
- Incumbent
- Assumed office 1 June 2014
- Appointed by: Jacob Zuma

Judge of the High Court
- In office 2007–2014
- Appointed by: Thabo Mbeki
- Division: Western Cape

Personal details
- Born: Dumisani Hamilton Zondi; 23 December 1957 (age 68) Pietermaritzburg, Natal; Union of South Africa
- Education: University of Fort Hare; University of Natal; Georgetown University

Dumisani Hamilton Zondi (born 23 December 1957) is a South African judge who is the Deputy President of the Supreme Court of Appeal. He was appointed as the chairperson of the Electoral Court in December 2022. Before his elevation to the Supreme Court in June 2014, he served in the Western Cape High Court between 2007 and 2014, as well as in the Competition Appeal Court between 2011 and 2014. He entered legal practice as an attorney in 1986.

== Early life and education ==
Zondi was born on 23 December 1957 in Pietermaritzburg in the former Natal Province. He matriculated at St. Augustine's High School in Dundee and went on to complete a BJuris at the University of Fort Hare in 1982 and an LLB at the University of Natal in 1984.

== Legal practice ==
After graduating, Zondi moved to Germiston to serve his articles of clerkship at Mendelsohn & De Villiers. He was admitted as an attorney in 1986 and worked at Hattenbach & Abraham in Johannesburg until 1987, when he enrolled in Georgetown University Law Center as a Fulbright Scholar. He completed his LLM in labour law at Georgetown in 1988 and spent that summer as a visiting lecturer at Portland State University in Oregon.

Upon his return to South Africa, Zondi practised as an attorney between 1989 and 2007, leading his own firm, Zondi Attorneys. For much of that time, between 1997 and 2006, he was a commissioner at the Commission for Conciliation, Mediation and Arbitration. He was also an acting judge in the Western Cape Division of the High Court of South Africa on several occasions between 2004 and 2007.

In 2005, he was shortlisted and interviewed by the Judicial Service Commission for one of two permanent vacancies in the Western Cape High Court. He had been asked to apply for the position by Western Cape Judge President John Hlophe, whom he had met at the University of Fort Hare and of whom he was considered a "protege".

However, as an acting judge, Zondi had recently imposed an unusually lax sentence on a child rapist, and his interview was diverted by criticism of that judgement from commissioners including George Bizos and Lindiwe Hendricks; the Judicial Service Commission did not recommend him for appointment.

== Western Cape High Court: 2007–2014 ==
On 28 May 2007, President Thabo Mbeki appointed Zondi permanently to the bench of the Western Cape High Court, following another round of interviews with the Judicial Service Commission. Soon after his appointment, he heard the Treatment Action Campaign's application to interdict Matthias Rath from distributing quack HIV/AIDS treatments. In 2009, he presided in Woodways CC v Vallie, which concerned the application of the Promotion of Equality and Prevention of Unfair Discrimination Act.

Simultaneously, Zondi was seconded as an acting judge to the Competition Appeal Court between 2009 and 2011. In May 2011, on the advice of the Judicial Service Commission, President Jacob Zuma appointed him to a permanent ten-year term in the Competition Appeal Court. He was also an acting judge in the Labour Appeal Court in 2012 and in the Supreme Court of Appeal in 2013.

== Supreme Court of Appeal: 2014–present ==
In April 2014, Zondi was one of seven candidates shortlisted for three permanent vacancies at the Supreme Court of Appeal. He was viewed as one of the frontrunners and was a popular candidate among Western Cape lawyers, but the Johannesburg Bar did not support his elevation, writing that he still had the "potential to develop further as a high court judge". He had a brief interview, with the Supreme Court's Lex Mpati reporting that appellate judges had "no problems" with him, and the Judicial Service Commission recommended him for appointment. President Zuma confirmed his appointment with effect from 1 June 2014. He gave up his seat on the Competition Appeal Court upon joining the Supreme Court bench.

While on the Supreme Court bench, he was a member of the Judicial Conduct Committee of the Judicial Service Commission between 2019 and 2023. In that capacity, he wrote for a majority of the Judicial Conduct Appeal Committee in dismissing Chief Justice Mogoeng Mogoeng's appeal against a finding of misconduct arising from Mogoeng's public remarks about the State of Israel.

=== Constitutional Court ===
Between July and December 2017, he was an acting judge in the Constitutional Court of South Africa, filling the seat of Raymond Zondo. He wrote the Constitutional Court's majority judgement in Levenstein v Estate of the Late Sidney Lewis Frankel, which declared Section 18 of the Criminal Procedure Act to be unconstitutional insofar as it prescribed a 20-year limit on the prosecution of certain sexual offences.

=== Electoral Court ===
In August 2022, Zondi was appointed as acting chairperson of the Electoral Court of South Africa, a specialised court established to review decisions of the Electoral Commission. In October that year, he was one of two candidates interviewed to fill the position permanently, the other being Connie Mocumie. He told the Judicial Service Commission that he would increase the size of the court from five judges to ten in order to deal with the anticipated increase in workload ahead of the 2024 general election. The commission recommended him for appointment, and President Cyril Ramaphosa confirmed his permanent appointment in December 2022.

Zondi was chairperson of the Electoral Court during the 2024 South African general election. In that capacity, in April 2024, he wrote the majority judgment in MK Party v Electoral Commission, in which the court ruled that former President Zuma was eligible to stand as a candidate for his MK Party in the election. That judgment was overturned by the Constitutional Court in May 2024.

=== Deputy Presidency ===
On 21 May 2024, the Judicial Service Commission interviewed Zondi as the sole candidate for appointment as deputy president of the Supreme Court of Appeal. President Ramaphosa had nominated Zondi for that position in February, as the incumbent deputy president, Xola Petse, was due to retire on 10 July. The Constitutional Court had handed down judgment in MK Party the day before his interview, and, when asked about the divergence between his judgment and that of the higher court, Zondi said that there was "no right or wrong" in statutory interpretation.

After the interviews, the Judicial Service Commission announced that it would recommend Zondi as suitable for appointment as deputy president.

== Personal life ==
Zondi has a spouse, Vera, and three children.
