= Elias Matojane =

South African judge (born 1960)

The Honourable Elias Matojane

Judge of the Supreme Court of Appeal
- Incumbent
- Assumed office 1 December 2022
- Appointed by: Cyril Ramaphosa

Judge of the High Court
- In office 12 December 2009 – 30 November 2022
- Appointed by: Jacob Zuma
- Division: Gauteng

Personal details
- Born: Keoagile Elias Matojane; 9 September 1960 (age 66) Soweto, Transvaal; Union of South Africa
- Education: University of Zululand; Rand Afrikaans University; University of South Africa

Keoagile Elias Matojane (born 9 September 1960) is a South African judge of the Supreme Court of Appeal. Formerly an attorney, he was a judge of the Gauteng High Court from December 2009 until December 2022, when he was appointed to the Supreme Court of Appeal.

== Early life and education ==
Matojane was born on 9 September 1960 in Soweto. He matriculated from Madibane High School in Soweto in 1981 and attended the University of Zululand, where he completed a BProc in 1986 and an LLB in 1988. Later, he completed two LLMs, one at the Rand Afrikaans University in 1995 and another at the University of South Africa in 2007, and he also holds a diploma in company law from the University of Johannesburg and a diploma in trial advocacy from the University of Colorado Boulder.

== Career as an attorney ==
Matojane was admitted as an attorney in 1991 and practiced for nearly two decades. He was additionally admitted as a conveyancer in 2000. At an advanced stage of his private practice, he was invited to serve as an acting judge in the High Court of South Africa, first in the Cape High Court between 2007 and 2008 and then in the South Gauteng High Court in 2009.

== Gauteng High Court: 2009–2022 ==
In November 2009, President Jacob Zuma announced that Matojane would join the Gauteng High Court permanently with effect from 12 December 2009. He was additionally appointed as a judge in the Land Claims Court in 2014, and he was an acting judge in the Competition Appeals Court in 2020. He also served as an acting judge in both higher courts – in the Constitutional Court on one occasion in 2015 and in the Supreme Court of Appeal on three occasions between April 2020 and September 2022 – as well as in the Constitutional Court of Lesotho in 2017. Finally, he was the acting judge president of the Land Claims Court in 2014 and the acting deputy judge president of the South Gauteng High Court in 2020.

=== Prominent cases ===
In Gauteng, Matojane presided in several prominent or politically sensitive matters. In 2015, he overturned the suspension of Shadrack Sibiya from his position at the Hawks, finding that Hawks head Berning Ntlemeza was "biased and dishonest". In 2018, he ruled against two non-profit organisations – the South African History Archive and Open Secrets – which had brought an application in terms of the Promotion of Access to Information Act, seeking to compel the South African Reserve Bank to provide information about apartheid-era white-collar crimes. The following year, he ordered the Economic Freedom Fighters (EFF) to pay R500,000 in damages to Trevor Manuel for making defamatory and false statements about Manuel; the defamation finding was upheld by the Supreme Court of Appeal, although the appellate court referred the determination of damages to oral hearings.

Most prominently, in December 2021, Matojane overturned the decision of the National Commissioner for Correctional Services to grant medical parole to former President Jacob Zuma, who had been imprisoned for contempt of court. Matojane said that the Commissioner, Arthur Fraser, had acted irrationally and in violation of the Correctional Services Act. The Supreme Court of Appeal upheld this decision, though it disagreed with Matojane's declaratory order that Zuma's time on parole should not be considered towards the fulfilment of his sentence. In 2020, during the Democratic Alliance's unsuccessful challenge to the legality of the COVID-19 lockdown in South Africa, Matojane wrote a dissenting judgement in which he argued that it was unconstitutional for the Disaster Management Act to grant the executive branch the power to enforce such a lockdown indefinitely.

=== 2021 JSC interview ===
In April 2021, the Judicial Service Commission shortlisted and interviewed Matojane as a candidate for permanent appointment to the Supreme Court of Appeal. During the interviews, Matojane was questioned about his reasoning in the EFF's defamation case by the EFF's own leader, politician Julius Malema, who served on the commission. The Judicial Service Commission did not recommend Matojane for appointment, but the non-profit Council for the Advancement of the South African Constitution laid a formal complaint against Malema with Parliament. In December, Parliament's Joint Committee on Ethics and Members' Interests found that Malema's questioning of Matojane breached the parliamentary ethics code insofar as Malema used the platform of the interviews to promote "his personal interests"; the Committee recommended that Malema should be sanctioned and forced to apologise to Motojane and to the Judicial Service Commission. Malema challenged the committee's report in court.

== Supreme Court of Appeal: 2022–present ==
In October 2022, Matojane was shortlisted again for one of five new vacancies at the Supreme Court of Appeal. During the Judicial Service Commission's interviews, Malema asked Matojane obliquely about his ruling on Zuma's parole, the appeal of which was still pending; Matojane refused to answer and ended the interview with a plea to the commission to "bear in mind that we are sitting judges. I may be in court tomorrow and, if I am to avail myself for this process and get humiliated, what are we saying to the parties who are appearing before us?" The Judicial Service Commission recommended Matojane for appointment, and he joined the bench on 1 December 2022.

== Personal life ==
He is married to Rachel Matojane and has three children.
