= Piet Meyer =

South African judge

The Honourable Piet Meyer

Judge of the Supreme Court of Appeal
- Incumbent
- Assumed office 1 December 2022
- Appointed by: Cyril Ramaphosa

Judge of the High Court
- In office 12 November 2007 – 30 November 2022
- Appointed by: Thabo Mbeki
- Division: Gauteng

Personal details
- Born: Pieter Andries Meyer; 7 December 1960 (age 65) Durban, Natal Province; Union of South Africa
- Education: Paul Roos Gymnasium
- Alma mater: Stellenbosch University

Pieter Andries Meyer (born 7 December 1960) is a South African judge of the Supreme Court of Appeal. Before his elevation to that court, he was a judge of the Gauteng High Court from November 2007 to November 2022. He formerly practised law in Johannesburg, where he was admitted as an advocate in 1986 and took silk in 2004.

== Early life and education ==
Meyer was born on 7 December 1960 in Durban in the former Natal Province. He matriculated at Paul Roos Gymnasium in Stellenbosch in 1978 and went on to Stellenbosch University, where he completed a BA in 1981 and an LLB in 1983.

== Legal practice ==
Meyer was admitted as an advocate of the High Court of South Africa in 1986, and he practised at the Johannesburg Bar for the next 21 years. He was awarded silk status in 2004. On six separate occasions between March 2003 and November 2011, he served as an acting judge in the Johannesburg High Court.

== Gauteng High Court: 2007–2022 ==
Meyer joined the Gauteng High Court permanently on 12 November 2007, when he was appointed to the bench by President Thabo Mbeki. In his 15 years in the High Court, Meyer wrote over 200 judgements, only two of which were overturned on appeal by the Supreme Court of Appeal. Prominent cases decided by him included Old Mutual Limited v Moyo, a dispute between Old Mutual and its erstwhile CEO, Peter Moyo; and DA v President; Economic Freedom Fighters v State Attorneys, in which he ruled in favour of the opposition Democratic Alliance in finding that former President Jacob Zuma was not entitled to taxpayer-funded legal representation in his criminal corruption defense.

Meyer also served four lengthy stints as an acting judge in the Supreme Court of Appeal, beginning in April 2013. As an acting justice, he wrote judgements in insurance law, tax law, environmental law, and constitutional law; notably, his 2013 judgement in Harmony Gold v Free State Department of Water Affairs established that mining companies (in this case, Harmony Gold) had an obligation to rehabilitate environmental damage produced by corporate pollution. When politician Narend Singh complimented Meyer on the "innovative and quite bold" Harmony Gold judgement, Meyer said, "One must invariably be innovative to write a judgment that is correct."

On four occasions – in 2014, 2016, 2018, and 2019 – Meyer applied unsuccessfully for permanent elevation to the Supreme Court bench. During his unsuccessful interviews, members of the Judicial Service Commission raised concerns that his elevation would not promote affirmative action objectives, as well as concerns that he had only made sparse contributions to the development of jurisprudence.

== Supreme Court of Appeal: 2022–present ==
In October 2022, the Judicial Service Commission shortlisted and interviewed Meyer, for the fifth and final time, for a permanent vacancy on the Supreme Court of Appeal. He was at that time the most senior judge in the Gauteng High Court, behind the Judge President and his deputies. During the interview, Deputy Chief Justice Mandisa Maya said that when Meyer had previously interviewed for vacancies, he had "competed at a time when the demographics didn’t favour you"; Meyer said that he had understood and had not resented the situation. He was among the five judges whom the Judicial Service Commission recommended for appointment, and his appointment was confirmed by President Cyril Ramaphosa with effect from 1 December 2022.

== Personal life ==
He is married to lawyer Karin Meyer and has one child.
