= Jeremiah Shongwe =

South African judge

The Honourable Jeremiah Shongwe

Acting Deputy President of the Supreme Court of Appeal of South Africa
- In office 2017–2018
- Preceded by: Mandisa Maya
- Succeeded by: Xola Petse

Judge of the Supreme Court of Appeal
- In office 2009–2017

Deputy Judge President of the North Gauteng High Court
- In office 2005–2009

Judge of the North Gauteng High Court
- In office 2001–2005

Personal details
- Born: Jeremiah Buti Zwelibanzi Shongwe; 3 December 1948 (age 77) Pretoria, South Africa
- Citizenship: South African
- Education: University of Zululand
- Profession: Attorney

Jeremiah Buti Zwelibanzi Shongwe (born 3 December 1948) is a South African jurist and former judge of the Supreme Court of Appeal of South Africa.

== Early life and education ==
Born in Pretoria, Shongwe was educated at Edendale Technical High School in Pietermaritzburg. He obtained a B.Proc degree from University of Zululand in 1974 and was admitted as an attorney during 1979.

== Career ==
Shongwe practised as an attorney for more than twenty years and during 2000 he acted as a judge for the first time, after which, from January 2001, he was permanently appointed at the North Gauteng High Court in Pretoria. In 2005, he was appointed the Deputy Judge President of the same Division and in 2009 he was appointed to the Supreme Court of Appeal of South Africa. For two years, 2017 and 2018, he acted as the Deputy President of the Supreme Court of Appeal. Shongwe was appointed the chairperson of the Electoral Court of South Africa, in May 2014.

== Honours ==
Shongwe was awarded an honorary LLD (Honoris Causa) from the University of Venda during 2007.
