= John E. Smith =

John E. Smith may refer to:

- John E. Smith (general), a Swiss immigrant to the United States who served as a Union general during the American Civil War
- John E. Smith (New York politician) (1843–1907), American politician
- John E. Smith, Director of U.S. Treasury Office of Foreign Assets Control
- John Eldon Smith (1930–1983), American murderer
- John Eldrid Smith, South African judge
- John Edwin Smith, American philosopher
- J. E. Smith (c. 1862/1863–1912), English trade union leader

== See also ==
- John Smith (disambiguation)
- Johnny Smith (disambiguation)
