= Daniel Dlodlo =

South African judge

Judge of the Supreme Court of Appeal
- In office 1 June 2019 – 2022
- Appointed by: Cyril Ramaphosa

Judge of the High Court
- In office 1 August 2004 – 31 May 2019
- Appointed by: Thabo Mbeki
- Division: Western Cape

Personal details
- Born: Daniel Vuminkosi Dlodlo; 4 April 1952 (age 74) Nongoma, Natal; Union of South Africa
- Education: University of Zululand

Daniel Vuminkosi Dlodlo (born 4 April 1952) is a South African retired judge who served in the Supreme Court of Appeal from 2019 to 2022. A former attorney, he joined the bench as a judge of the High Court's Western Cape Division from August 2004 to May 2019. He was also an acting judge in the Constitutional Court in 2018.

== Early life and education ==
Dlodlo was born on 4 April 1952 in Nongoma in the former Natal Province. He matriculated at Dlangezwa High School, where he was a prefect, in 1974. Thereafter he attended the University of Zululand, where he was a member of the debating team and the president of the student representative council in 1979. He graduated with a BProc in 1979 and an LLB in 1982.

== Legal career ==
While studying towards his LLB, Dlodlo began his legal career at the Nqutu Magistrate's Court, first as a court interpreter in 1970 and then as a public prosecutor in 1980. He was a candidate attorney at George-Hattingh Kie Attorneys in Vryheid in 1981, and the following year, he set up his own firm of attorneys, Dan Dlodlo and Company, in Vryheid.

While working as an attorney, Dlodlo was a commissioner at the Small Claims Court in Vryheid in 1991. He also served as an acting judge in the Labour Court in 2002. He was granted right of appearance in the Supreme Court in 1996.

== Cape High Court: 2004–2019 ==
In July 2004, President Thabo Mbeki announced that, on the advice of the Judicial Service Commission, Dlodlo would join the bench permanently as a judge of the Western Cape Division of the High Court of South Africa. The other frontrunner for the judicial vacancy was Geoff Budlender, a prominent white Senior Counsel, and Dlodlo's appointment therefore provoked public debate about demographic transformation and affirmative action in the judiciary. He joined the bench on 1 August 2004.

During his 15 years in the High Court, Dlodlo was an acting judge in the Labour Appeal Court for four terms between 2013 and 2014 and an acting judge in the Supreme Court of Appeal for a total of three terms in 2016 and 2019. In addition, he was an acting judge in the Constitutional Court of South Africa for almost a year, from 29 January 2018 to 7 December 2018.

== Supreme Court of Appeal: 2019–2022 ==
In April 2019, Dlodlo was one of several candidates whom the Judicial Service Commission shortlisted and interviewed for possible elevation to the Supreme Court of Appeal. Recently turned 67, Dlodlo was asked obliquely about his age, and told the interview panel that he had "matured" through his long experience at the High Court. After the interviews, Dlodlo was among the five candidates whom the Judicial Service Commission recommended for appointment – the others being Caroline Nicholls, Fikile Mokgohloa, Thokozile Mbatha, and Clive Plasket – and President Cyril Ramaphosa confirmed his appointment in June 2019. His appointment took effect on 1 June 2019.

He retired in 2022 upon reaching the mandatory retirement age of 70.

== Personal life ==
He is married to Duduzile Daphney Dlodlo and has two children.
