= John Smith (South African judge) =

South African judge (born 1958)

The Honourable John Smith

Judge of the Supreme Court of Appeal
- Incumbent
- Assumed office 1 July 2024
- Appointed by: Cyril Ramaphosa

Judge of the High Court
- In office 26 July 2010 – 30 June 2024
- Appointed by: Jacob Zuma
- Division: Eastern Cape

Personal details
- Born: John Eldrid Smith; 5 November 1958 (age 67) Herschel, Cape Province; Union of South Africa
- Education: University of the Western Cape; Rhodes University

John Eldrid Smith (born 5 November 1958) is a South African judge who has served in the Supreme Court of Appeal since July 2024. He joined the bench in July 2010 as a judge of the Eastern Cape Division in the High Court of South Africa. Before that, he was the chief executive officer of Smith Tabata Inc., which he co-founded in 1984.

== Early life and education ==
Smith was born on 5 November 1958 in Herschel, a small town near Sterkspruit in what was then the Cape Province (now the Eastern Cape). He grew up in nearby Queenstown, matriculating in 1976 at Maria Louw High School. He is Coloured.

After high school, he completed a BA in law at the University of the Western Cape in 1979 and an LLB at Rhodes University in 1981. Later, while a practising lawyer, he completed a diploma in advanced labour law at the University of Cape Town in 1989.

== Legal career ==
Between 1982 and 1984, Smith completed his articles of clerkship under T. M. Mdlalana, an attorney based in the Eastern Cape. He was admitted as an attorney in 1984. Later the same year, he co-founded the firm of Smith, Tabata and Van Heerden, which was later reincorporated as Smith Tabata Inc. While working there as a partner, he was active in progressive professional organisations: among other things, he joined the National Association of Democratic Lawyers in 1983 and ultimately joined its senior leadership, serving as its national vice-president from 1989 to 1990 and as its general secretary from 1990 to 1992. During the same period, he was a trustee of the Legal Resources Centre.

After the end of apartheid, Smith served briefly as a member of the Eastern Cape Provincial Legislature from 1994 to 1995. Thereafter he remained in partnership at his firm for the rest of his career in practice; he was the firm's chief executive officer between 2007 and 2010. At the same time, between 1998 and 2010, he served several stints as an acting judge in the Grahamstown High Court and Bhisho High Court. Finally, he chaired the Ministerial Committee of Inquiry into Transformation in Cricket, which was appointed by Minister of Sport Ngconde Balfour in 2001.

== Eastern Cape High Court: 2010–2024 ==
In April 2010 in Cape Town, Smith was interviewed by the Judicial Service Commission as a candidate for possible permanent appointment to the bench of the High Court of South Africa. The JSC recommended his appointment, which President Jacob Zuma confirmed the following month. He took office on 26 July 2010 in the Eastern Cape Division, and he was based at the division's seat in Grahamstown. Over the next 14 years, only four of his judgments were overturned on appeal, and he wrote 14 reported judgments. According to Judges Matter, he distinguished himself in property law matters.

In 2017, he was one of four candidates shortlisted for promotion to become the division's Judge President, but, after he and three other candidates were interviewed in Midrand in April, the Judicial Service Commission declined to make an appointment; the position ultimately went to Selby Mbenenge.

While serving in the High Court, Smith spent three terms as an acting judge in the Supreme Court of Appeal, first from October 2021 to March 2022 and then from April 2024 to September 2024. He wrote for majority judgments for the appellate court. During that period, he was thrice interviewed as a candidate for possible elevation to permanent vacancies in the Supreme Court. Both in his October 2022 interview and in his October 2023 interview, Judge of Appeal Xola Petse pressed him on deficiencies in his writing. On neither occasion did the Judicial Service Commission recommend Smith for appointment. The commission's October 2023 deliberations were later made public in court filings, and it transpired that Smith had been one of the top five candidates (among ten in total) but had failed to receive the support of a majority of the panel.

== Supreme Court of Appeal: 2024–present ==
The third time Smith was shortlisted for the Supreme Court of Appeal, as one of ten candidates for three vacancies in May 2024, his interview was successful; the Judicial Service Commission said that it would recommend Smith, along with Judges David Unterhalter and Raylene Keightley, as suitable for elevation to the Supreme Court. He joined the higher court on 1 July 2024.

== Personal life ==
He is married to Naomi Josephine Smith and has two children.
