= Nathan Ponnan =

South African judge

The Honourable Nathan Ponnan

Judge of the Supreme Court of Appeal
- Incumbent
- Assumed office 1 December 2004
- Appointed by: Thabo Mbeki

Judge of the High Court
- In office 2001–2004
- Appointed by: Thabo Mbeki
- Division: Gauteng

Personal details
- Born: Visvanathan Ponnan; 17 August 1960 (age 66) Durban, Natal Province; Union of South Africa
- Spouse: Vinitha Jithoo
- Education: University of Durban–Westville

Visvanathan Ponnan (born 17 August 1960) is a South African judge of the Supreme Court of Appeal. He joined the Gauteng High Court in 2001 and was elevated to the Supreme Court of Appeal in December 2004. Before that, he practised as an advocate in Durban between 1985 and 2001.

== Early life and education ==
Ponnan was born on 17 August 1960 in Durban. He matriculated at Gandhi Desai Secondary School and went on the University of Durban–Westville, where he completed a BA in 1982 and an LLB in 1984.

== Legal practice ==
He was admitted as an advocate of the High Court of South Africa in 1985 and practised at the Durban Bar for the next 16 years. During that time, between 1995 and 1998, he served on the Judge White Commission, which was established by President Nelson Mandela to investigate the administration of the former TBVC states. He was also a commissioner of the Commission for Conciliation, Mediation and Arbitration between 2000 and 2001, and he was an acting judge in the Eastern Cape High Court in 2000.

== Judicial career ==
Ponnan joined the bench permanently in 2001, when he was appointed as a judge of the Gauteng High Court. During his latter years in the High Court, he was an acting judge in the Supreme Court of Appeal between 2003 and 2004.

In October 2004, he was one of six candidates shortlisted and interviewed as a candidate for appointment to one of three vacancies at the Supreme Court of Appeal. The Judicial Service Commission recommended his appointment, and he was appointed by President Thabo Mbeki in November 2004, alongside Dunstan Mlambo and Chris Jafta. He was often noted for his judgements on open justice matters and freedom of information, and he wrote the court's judgements in prominent matters concerning Western Cape Judge President John Hlophe and the corruption prosecution of former President Jacob Zuma.

== Personal life ==
He is married to Vinitha Jithoo and has two children.
