= Peter Combrinck =

South African judge

Personal details
- Born: Peter Carl Combrinck

Peter Carl Combrinck is a South African retired judge who served in the Supreme Court of Appeal. He was appointed to the appellate bench on 13 November 2006 by President Thabo Mbeki, following interviews with the Judicial Service Commission the prior month.
