= Billy Mothle =

South African judge

The Honourable Billy Mothle

Judge of the Supreme Court of Appeal
- Incumbent
- Assumed office 1 July 2021
- Appointed by: Cyril Ramaphosa

Judge of the High Court
- In office 1 January 2011 – 30 June 2021
- Appointed by: Jacob Zuma
- Division: Gauteng

Personal details
- Born: Selewe Peter Mothle; 24 July 1956 (age 69) Lady Selborne, Pretoria; Transvaal, Union of South Africa
- Education: Mamelodi High School
- Alma mater: University of South Africa; Georgetown University

Selewe Peter "Billy" Mothle (born 24 July 1956) is a South African judge of the Supreme Court of Appeal. Before his elevation to that court, he was a judge of the Gauteng High Court from January 2011 to June 2021. He rose to prominence as a lawyer in Pretoria, where he practised as an attorney until he gained admittance as an advocate in 1998. He took silk in 2008.

== Early life and education ==
Mothle was born on 24 July 1956 in Lady Selborne, Pretoria in the former Transvaal. He matriculated in 1974 at Pretoria's Mamelodi High School and enrolled in legal study at the University of the North, but he was excluded after the 1976 Soweto uprising. He completed his degree at the University of South Africa, receiving a BProc in 1979. Several years later, in 1987, he completed an LLM at the Georgetown University Law Center.

== Legal practice ==
Between 1980 and 1982, Mothle served his articles of clerkship at Maluleke, Seriti & Moseneke, the law offices of George Maluleke, Willie Seriti, and Dikgang Moseneke. After he was admitted as an attorney in 1982, he remained at the firm until he joined Mothle, Matlala Mahlangu & Moabi Attorneys as a partner in 1983. He practiced primarily in Pretoria, where his clients included anti-apartheid activists detained for political offences. He was a founding member of Lawyers for Human Rights and the founding vice-president of the Democratic Lawyers Congress.

In 1986, Mothle moved to Washington D. C. to attend Georgetown University on a Fulbright Scholarship. During his year in the United States, he was a summer associate at Pillsbury, Madison & Sutro in Washington D. C., and he also completed a diploma through the National Institute for Trial Advocacy. Upon his return to South Africa, he resumed his legal practice and also served as national director of Lawyers for Human Rights between 1988 and 1992. Thereafter he served in a series of contract positions, first as a legal consultant to the International Organisation for Migration from 1992 to 1994, then as a legal advisor to the post-apartheid Northern Province Executive Council from 1994 to 1996, and finally as chief director of investigations at the Independent Complaints Directorate from 1997 to 1998.

On 19 May 1998, Mothle was admitted as an advocate in the High Court of South Africa. He served as executive director of the Independent Electoral Commission from 1998 to 2000, and then, in 2001, he took up practice at the Pretoria Bar. He was admitted as an advocate in the High Court of Lesotho in February 2008, and in April of that year he was awarded silk status in the South African High Court. As an advocate, he practised primarily in administrative law, land restitution, tax, and local government law. He was attached to Circle Chambers and was active in Advocates for Transformation, serving on its national executive committee from 2005 to 2007. In addition, between 2008 and 2010, he served several terms as an acting judge in the Gauteng Division of the High Court.

== Gauteng High Court: 2011–2021 ==
In November 2010, President Jacob Zuma announced that he would appoint Mothle permanently to the bench of the Gauteng High Court with effect from 1 January 2011. He spent over ten years on the bench. During that period, he presided over the conviction of Masego Kgomo's murderer; until he struck the case from the roll, he also presided in the prosecution of politician Julius Malema on corruption charges. Perhaps most prominently, in 2017, he presided over the reopening of the inquest into the death of Ahmed Timol, an anti-apartheid activist who died in 1971 at John Vorster Square. Mothle overturned the apartheid-era inquest in finding that Timol had not committed suicide but had been tortured and murdered by members of the Security Branch. He later said of the matter that, "I realised early on there was no precedent to follow. I knew that every step I was taking was setting a precedent. His ruling set a precedent for reopening investigations into deaths of other anti-apartheid activists.

During his time as a High Court judge, Mothle served as an acting judge in the Supreme Court of Appeal between December 2017 and September 2018, and later in June 2021. In February 2019, the Judicial Service Commission shortlisted him as one of nine candidates for five permanent vacancies at the Supreme Court of Appeal. He was nominated for the position by Advocates for Transformation. At his interview, held in April that year, he expressed his support for feminism and his opposition to capital punishment. However, the Judicial Service Commission did not recommend him for appointment.

In September 2019, Mothle was among the eight judges appointed to serve on the Special Investigating Unit's Special Tribunal, a judicial body newly established by President Cyril Ramaphosa to expedite the civil recovery of public funds lost to corruption and irregular expenditure. He was seconded to the tribunal for two years, leaving once he was elevated to the Supreme Court of Appeal in 2021.

== Supreme Court of Appeal: 2021–present ==
In April 2021, Mothle was shortlisted and interviewed again for new vacancies on the Supreme Court of Appeal. He had a brief, 25-minute interview, with questions centring on the Timol inquest, which Chief Justice Mogoeng Mogoeng said he had handled with "great wisdom and dignity". Mothle told the Judicial Service Commission panel that he had applied for the vacancy because he wanted to end his career at a higher court when he retired in five years. He was among the five candidates whom the Judicial Service Commission recommended for appointment, and he joined the Supreme Court bench on 1 July 2021.

== Personal life ==
He is married and has two children. He was the secretary-general of the South African Softball Federation from 1977 to 1981, and he has been a trustee of his former high school, Mamelodi High, since 2017.
