= Sharise Weiner =

South African judge

The Honourable Sharise Weiner

Judge of the Supreme Court of Appeal
- Incumbent
- Assumed office 1 December 2022
- Appointed by: Cyril Ramaphosa

Judge of the High Court
- In office 25 July 2011 – 30 November 2022
- Appointed by: Jacob Zuma
- Division: Gauteng

Personal details
- Born: Sharise Erica Weiner; 28 January 1954 (age 72)
- Spouse: Darryl Ackerman
- Education: University of the Witwatersrand

Sharise Erica Weiner (born 28 January 1954) is a South African judge of the Supreme Court of Appeal. Before her appointment to the Supreme Court in December 2022, she was a judge of the South Gauteng High Court from 2011 to 2022. She was admitted as an advocate in 1978 and gained silk status in 1995.

== Early life and career ==
Born on 28 January 1954, Weiner grew up in Johannesburg, where she attended Cyrildene Primary School and Athlone Girls' High School. She completed a BA in 1975 and an LLB in 1977, both from the University of the Witwatersrand. She was involved in student advocacy and was a founding member of Lawyers for Human Rights.

In April 1978, Weiner was admitted as an advocate in the High Court of South Africa and began her legal practice, primarily in corporate law. She received silk status in South Africa in 1995, and in 1999 she was called to the Bar of England and Wales. She was an arbitrator in commercial disputes between 1996 and 2011, and during the same period she was appointed as an acting judge in the Gauteng High Court on multiple occasions. In addition, Weiner was vice-chairperson of the General Council of the Bar from 2000 to 2010.

== Judicial career ==
=== Gauteng High Court: 2011–2022 ===
Weiner joined the High Court permanently on 25 July 2011, when she was appointed as a judge in the South Gauteng High Court; she was appointed by President Jacob Zuma on the advice of the Judicial Service Commission. During her decade on the High Court bench, she was seconded as an acting judge to the Supreme Court of Appeal on several occasions between 2019 and 2022.

In addition, in 2016, Weiner was shortlisted for appointment to succeed Thuli Madonsela as Public Protector. During an interview with Parliament's Portfolio Committee on Justice and Correctional Services on 11 August, Weiner argued that the Public Protector should pursue tender corruption investigations more vigorously. She was included on the committee's final shortlist of five candidates, but Busisiwe Mkhwebane was ultimately appointed to the position instead.

=== Supreme Court of Appeal: 2022–present ===
In April 2021, the Judicial Service Commission interviewed Weiner in connection with vacancies at the Supreme Court of Appeal. Members of the Commission expressed concern that she was close to retirement age, leading Weiner to opine that, "Age seems to be the final frontier of discrimination, which is also unconstitutional." Although Weiner was not appointed in 2021, she was nominated again the following year when new vacancies arose at the Supreme Court. In October 2022, the Judicial Service Commission recommended her promotion. She joined the Supreme Court on 1 December; she was the oldest member appointed to the bench.

== Personal life ==
Weiner is Jewish. She is married to Darryl Ackerman, who is an attorney; they have three children.
