= Table of precedence in South Africa =

Relative preeminence of officials for ceremonial purposes

The South African table of precedence is a nominal and symbolic hierarchy of important positions within the Republic of South Africa. It has no legal standing but is used to dictate ceremonial protocol at events of a national nature.

No date of issuance was known to the public, but the present table was amended on 1 January 1996.

== Table of precedence ==
South African Official Table of Precedence is as follows:

Rubric	Description
1	President of the Republic (Cyril Ramaphosa)
2	Deputy President of the Republic (Paul Mashatile); President-elect of the Republic
3	Chief Justice (Mandisa Maya)
3	President of the Constitutional Court
4	Former presidents of the Republic: 1. Thabo Mbeki (14 June 1999 – 24 September 2008); 2. Kgalema Motlanthe (25 September 2008 – 9 May 2009); 3. Jacob Zuma (9 May 2009 – 14 February 2018)
4	Former deputy presidents of the Republic (note that Thabo Mbeki and Jacob Zuma, who would otherwise appear on the list, already appear above as former presidents): 1. Phumzile Mlambo-Ngcuka (14 June 2005 – 24 September 2008); 2. Baleka Mbete (25 September 2008 – 9 May 2009)
5	By seniority: Ministers; Speaker of the National Assembly (NA); Chairperson of the National Council of Provinces (NCOP); Premiers of Provinces
6	Ambassadors (by seniority)
6	Envoys Extraordinary and Ministers Plenipotentiary (by seniority)
6	Chargé d'affaires en titre (by seniority)
6	Heads of other Permanent Diplomatic Missions (by seniority)
7	By seniority: Deputy Ministers; Members of the Provincial Executive Councils; Speakers of Provincial Legislatures
7	By seniority: Deputy Speaker of NA; Deputy Chairperson of NCOP
7	By seniority: Chief Whip of the majority party in NA and NCOP; Deputy Speakers of Provincial Legislatures; Chairperson of NA Standing Committee on Public Accounts; Parliamentary Councillor of the President
8	Secretary of the Cabinet; Chief of the National Defence Force
9	Charges d'affaires ad interim of Embassies (by seniority)
9	Charges d'affaires ad interim of Legations (by seniority)
9	Charges d'affaires ad interim of other Permanent Diplomatic Missions (by seniority)
10	Leaders of other political parties in NA and NCOP (by seniority)
11	Deputy President of the Constitutional Court
11	Judges of Appeal (by seniority)
11	Judges of the Constitutional Court (by seniority)
11	Judges President (by seniority)
11	Deputy Judges President (by seniority)
11	Judges of the Supreme Court (by seniority)
12	Former Chief Justices: 1. Sandile Ngcobo (12 October 2009 – 12 August 2011); 2. Mogoeng Mogoeng (8 September 2011 - 11 October 2021)
13	Chairpersons of Commissions established under the Constitution (by seniority)
14	Members of NA and NCOP (by seniority)
14	Members of Provincial Legislatures (by seniority)
14	Local royalties (by seniority)
14	Chairman of the Council for Traditional Leaders
14	Chairpersons of the Provincial Houses of Traditional Leaders (by seniority)
15	By seniority: Auditor-General; Governor of the Reserve Bank; Chairperson of the Public Service Commission; Public Protector
15	Members of the Public Service Commission (by seniority)
15	Directors-General and their equivalents of Government Departments, including Secretary to NA, Secretary to NCOP, Secretary for Safety and Security, Defence Secretary and Directors-General of Provinces (by seniority)
15	Attorneys-General (by seniority)
15	Chairpersons of State Corporations (by seniority)
16	Mayor of the capital of the Province (in which the function is held)
16	Chairpersons of the Metropolitan Councils of the region (in which the function is held)
17	Mayor of other Provincial Capitals
18	The spouses of the foregoing persons enjoy the precedence of their spouses
19	Courtesy precedence at the discretion of the President.
