= Connie Mocumie =

South African judge (born 1965)

The Honourable Connie Mocumie

Judge of the Supreme Court of Appeal
- Incumbent
- Assumed office 1 July 2016
- Appointed by: Jacob Zuma

Judge of the High Court
- In office 3 March 2008 – 30 June 2016
- Appointed by: Thabo Mbeki
- Division: Free State

Personal details
- Born: 10 August 1965 (age 61) Warrenton, Cape Province, South Africa
- Education: University of Zululand; University of the North West; University of South Africa

Baratang Constance Mocumie (born 10 August 1965) is a South African judge of the Supreme Court of Appeal. Before joining the Supreme Court, she was a judge of the Free State High Court from March 2008 until June 2016. She is also a judge in the Military Court of Appeal and the primary South African liaison judge to the Hague Conference on Private International Law, and she was the president of the South African chapter of the International Association of Women Judges between 2010 and 2014. She began her legal career as a prosecutor and magistrate in the North West and Gauteng provinces.

== Early life and education ==
Mocumie was born on 10 August 1965 in Warrenton in the Northern Cape. Both of her parents were teachers, although her mother had begun her career as a domestic worker. After attending high school in Warrenton, Mocumie matriculated from St. Paul's High School in Taung and attended the University of Zululand, where she completed a BJuris in 1988. As a student in 1986, she was charged under the Riotous Assemblies Act for her participation in anti-apartheid protest during that year's state of emergency.

Later, Mocumie received an LLB from the University of the North West in 2000 and an LLM, specialising in family law, from the University of South Africa in 2005.

== Early legal career ==
Mocumie began her career in the Odi Magistrate's Court of Ga-Rankuwa, where she worked as a legal assistant between 1988 and 1990. After that, for the decade between 1991 and 2001, she served as a public prosecutor, stationed at the Molopo Magistrate's Court until 1995 and thereafter at the Klerksdorp Magistrate's Court. From 2001 to 2005, she was a magistrate, including, for a stint between 2002 and 2003, as acting regional magistrate for Pretoria; she also lectured magistrates at the Justice College. At the same time, in 2003, she was admitted as an advocate of the High Court of South Africa.

In 2005, Mocumie enrolled in the Aspirant Women Judges Programme, which was designed to elevate women to the bench of the High Court. After completing the programme, she was invited to serve several stints, between 2005 and 2008, as an acting judge in the High Court's Northern Cape Division, North West Division, and Free State Division.

== Free State High Court: 2008–2016 ==
In November 2007, President Thabo Mbeki announced that he would appoint Mocumie permanently to the Free State High Court; she joined the bench in March 2008. One of her influential judgements in the court was handed down in De Necker v MEC for the Free State Department of Health, where she articulated an interpretation of the Compensation for Occupational Injuries and Diseases Act which was later upheld by the Supreme Court of Appeal. She also served lengthy stints as an acting judge in several appellate courts: in the Labour Appeal Court from April to September 2011, in the Supreme Court of Appeal from December 2013 to November 2014, and in the Competition Appeal Court from April 2015 to March 2016. At the same time, she was the president of the South African chapter of the International Association of Women Judges between 2010 and 2014.

In April 2014, Mocumie was shortlisted and interviewed for appointment as Judge President of the Free State High Court, although none of her judgements had yet been reported. However, the Judicial Service Commission was unable to reach agreement on a recommendation, and the vacancy was re-advertised. Mocumie interviewed for the position again in October 2014, but, on that occasion, the Judicial Service Commission resolved to recommend Mocumie's colleague, Mahube Molemela, for the position.

Nonetheless, despite Molemela's appointment, Mocumie served as acting Judge President of the Free State High Court between April and May 2015. In the same year, she was appointed as a judge in the Military Court of the South African National Defence Force, a position she held for the next four years, and was also appointed as South Africa's primary liaison judge at the Hague Conference on Private International Law.

== Supreme Court of Appeal: 2016–present ==
In April 2016, Mocumie was shortlisted and interviewed for one of two vacancies on the permanent bench of the Supreme Court of Appeal. The Judicial Service Commission recommended her for appointment, which was confirmed by President Jacob Zuma in June 2016 with effect from 1 July. While in the Supreme Court, she continued to serve as a judge of the Military Court until 2019, when she was promoted to become a judge of the Military Court of Appeal.

In July 2022, Mocumie was one of two candidates shortlisted for the position of chairperson of the Electoral Court, the other being Dumisani Zondi, her colleague on the Supreme Court of Appeal. During her interview with the Judicial Service Commission, she discussed her ongoing role as liaison to the Hague Conference, urging Justice Minister Ronald Lamola – a member of the commission – to convey the urgency of participation to his department. The Judicial Service Commission recommended Zondi for the Electoral Court position.

== Personal life ==
Mocumie has two children. She speaks six South African languages.
