= Ernie Grosskopf =

South African judge

Judge of the Supreme Court
- In office 1995 – 31 March 1998
- Appointed by: Nelson Mandela
- Division: Appellate
- In office 1976–1995
- Division: Cape Provincial

Personal details
- Born: Ernst Martin Grosskopf; 29 December 1930 (age 95) Orange Free State, Union of South Africa
- Parent: E. B. Grosskopf
- Relatives: Koos Strauss (uncle)
- Education: Hoërskool Jan van Riebeeck
- Alma mater: University of Cape Town

Ernst Martin Grosskopf (born 29 December 1930) is a South African retired judge who served in the Supreme Court of Appeal. Formerly an advocate in Cape Town, he joined the Cape Provincial Division in 1976 and was elevated to the Appellate Division in 1995. He retired from the judiciary in 1998, shortly after the latter court was restructured as the Supreme Court of Appeal.

== Early life and legal career ==
Grosskopf was born on 29 December 1930 in the Orange Free State. The youngest of three children, he belonged to a prominent Afrikaner family; his father was the Afrikaans writer E. B. Grosskopf, and his maternal uncle was politician Koos Strauss. His brother, Johannes Grosskopf, married the writer Santie Grosskopf and became a journalism professor and editor of Beeld.

Grosskopf attended the Jan van Riebeeck Primary School and Jan van Riebeeck Secondary School in Cape Town, matriculating in 1947, and went on to the University of Cape Town, where he completed a BA in 1950 and an LLB in 1952. In 1952 and 1953 he clerked for Judge Newton Ogilvie Thompson in the Cape Provincial Division of the Supreme Court of South Africa. In 1954, he joined the Cape Bar as an advocate.

As a lawyer, Grosskopf took several cases involving South Africa's apartheid-era administration of South West Africa; as junior counsel, he worked on Consolidated Diamond Mines of South West Africa Limited v Administrator of South West Africa, and he later joined the legal teams that represented the South African administration before the International Court of Justice and United Nations. He also led the unsuccessful appeal against the apartheid government's decision to ban Andre Brink's 1973 novel Kennis van die aand. He was chairman of the Cape Bar Council from 1973 to 1974 and vice-chairman of the General Bar Council in 1976.

== Cape Provincial Division: 1976–1995 ==
After stints as an acting judge in the Cape Provincial Division in 1969 and 1976, Grosskopf was permanently appointed to that court in the latter half of 1976. During his 19 years in the Cape Provincial Division, his most influential judgments concerned commercial law; he also wrote notable early judgments in intellectual property law in the late 1980s and early 1990s.

Through 1983 and most of 1984, he was seconded to the Appellate Division as an acting judge, in which capacity he wrote the division's influential judgments in Murray & Roberts Construction v Upington Municipality and Lillicrap Wassenaar and Partners v Pilkington Brothers.

During the last decade of apartheid, Grosskopf presided in several cases relating to the government's use of states of emergency to suppress anti-apartheid activism. In another significant political matter, he was assigned with Peet Nienaber and John Smalberger to hear the appeal in the Upington 25 case, involving 25 defendants facing the death penalty for their involvement in protests which had led to the death of an Upington policeman; the trial judge had found that only four of the defendants participated in the fatal attack, but controversially convicted 21 other protestors on the basis of the common purpose doctrine. Grosskopf wrote for the appellate panel in setting aside most of the convictions.

== Appellate Division: 1995–1998 ==
In the second quarter of 1995, Grosskopf was permanently elevated to the Appellate Division by the first post-apartheid president, Nelson Mandela. Though he remained on the appellate court after it was restructured as the Supreme Court of Appeal in 1997, he retired on 31 March 1998 and returned to Cape Town with his wife, Deidre.
