= Zeenat Carelse =

South African judge

The Honourable Zeenat Carelse

Judge of the Supreme Court of Appeal
- In office 1 July 2021 – 2024
- Appointed by: Cyril Ramaphosa

Judge of the High Court
- In office 2009 – 30 June 2021
- Division: Gauteng

Personal details
- Born: 26 October 1966 (age 59) Durban, Natal, South Africa
- Education: University of Durban-Westville

Zeenat Carelse (born 16 October 1966) is a South African judge who became the inaugural president of the Land Claims Court in 2024. She was formerly a judge of the Supreme Court of Appeal between 2021 and 2024 and a judge of the Gauteng High Court between 2009 and 2021. She began her career as a public prosecutor and formerly served as a magistrate in Cape Town, Johannesburg, and Tembisa. She has also served lengthy acting stints in the Land Claims Court.

== Early life and education ==
Carelse was born on 16 October 1966 in Durban in the former Natal Province, now KwaZulu-Natal. When she was six years old, her family was subject to forced removal from their home under the apartheid-era Group Areas Act.

She matriculated from Bechet High School in Durban, where she was the head prefect, and then studied towards a joint BA–LLB at the University of Durban–Westville. However, after completing her BA coursework in 1989, she was forced to find a job to pay for the rest of her tuition; she worked briefly at First National Bank in Johannesburg. She completed her LLB in 1992 at the University of Durban, and in the same year, she represented the university at the African Moot Court in Harare, Zimbabwe.

== Early career ==
From 1994 to 1998, Carelse worked as a public prosecutor in the Pietermaritzburg and Pinetown magistrate's Courts. She was herself appointed as a magistrate in 1998 and heard criminal, family, and civil cases in the Johannesburg and Mitchells Plain magistrate's courts; she was acting senior magistrate in the latter court between 2000 and 2001. After that, from 2004 to 2008, she served as a regional magistrate in the magistrate's court of Tembisa. During this period, she was active in the International Association of Women Judges, the Commonwealth Magistrates' and Judges' Association, and the Judicial Officers' Association of South Africa.

In 2008, Carelse joined the Aspirant Judges Programme, designed to elevate women to the bench of the High Court of South Africa. Upon completing the programme later that year, she was invited to serve as an acting judge in Johannesburg's Gauteng High Court.

== Gauteng High Court: 2009–2021 ==
In 2009, Carelse was appointed permanently to the bench of the Gauteng High Court, where she served for over a decade. Influential decisions included Nono Cynthia Mañana v Presiding Officer of the Children’s Court, a 2013 decision which extended foster-care grants to grandparents of orphaned children; and State v Khanye, a 2017 decision which changed the sentencing regime for gang rape to allow that individuals could be convicted of gang rape, and sentenced accordingly, even in the absence of any co-accused. Carelse also presided over politically sensitive cases, including a successful appeal against the fraud conviction of prosecutor Jeff Ledwaba, the former investigating director of the Scorpions, and an unsuccessful attempt by members of the governing African National Congress to nullify the so-called "festival of chairs" that elected Oscar Mabuyane as the party's provincial chairperson.

In addition to a stint as acting deputy judge president in 2020, Carelse was frequently seconded as an acting judge in the Land Claims Court of Randburg between 2009 and 2021. She also served three separate periods as an acting judge in the Supreme Court of Appeal between October 2018 and June 2021. Carelse's 2012 judgement in Florence v Broadcount Investments, a Land Claims Court matter which concerned the calculation of equitable restitution for apartheid-era land dispossession, was disputed by the Supreme Court but upheld on appeal by the Constitutional Court.

== Supreme Court of Appeal: 2021–2024 ==
In April 2021, while Carelse was an acting judge in the Supreme Court of Appeal, she was one of 11 candidates interviewed for permanent appointment to the court. During her interview, asked by members of the Judicial Service Commission about her experience in the Land Claims Court, she said that, in her interpretation, existing law provided for land expropriation without compensation. The Judicial Service Commission recommended her for appointment to one of five vacancies in the Supreme Court. She took office on 1 July 2021.

== Land Claims Court: 2024–present ==
In April 2024, Carelse was one of four judges interviewed for possible appointment as the inaugural judge president of the Land Court, which would replace the Land Claims Court. On 9 April 2024, following the interviews, the Judicial Service Commission announced that it would recommend Carelse for the position, pending confirmation by President Cyril Ramaphosa. She left the Supreme Court of Appeal in order to work full-time in the Land Claims Court.

== Personal life ==
She is married to Adrian Roderick Harris, with whom she has one child.
