= Thokozile Mbatha =

South African judge

The Honourable Thokozile Mbatha

Judge of the Supreme Court of Appeal
- Incumbent
- Assumed office 1 June 2019
- Appointed by: Cyril Ramaphosa

Judge of the High Court
- In office 1 June 2011 – 31 May 2019
- Appointed by: Jacob Zuma
- Division: KwaZulu-Natal

Personal details
- Born: 19 July 1960 (age 66) Newcastle, Natal; Union of South Africa
- Education: University of Zululand

Yvonne Thokozile Mbatha (born 19 July 1960) is a South African judge of the Supreme Court of Appeal. Before her appointment to the Supreme Court, she was a judge of the KwaZulu-Natal High Court from June 2011 to June 2019. She was an acting judge in the Constitutional Court between August and December 2022.

== Early life and education ==
Mbatha was born on 19 July 1960 in Newcastle in the former Natal Province (present-day KwaZulu-Natal). She attended Inkamana High School in Vryheid from 1974 to 1976 and then St. Francis College in Mariannhill from 1977 until her matriculation in 1978. She completed her BProc at the University of Zululand in 1979; later, in 2021, she obtained a postgraduate diploma in maritime studies from the University of KwaZulu-Natal.

== Career as an attorney ==
Mbatha was admitted as an attorney on 28 April 1987, and she spent most of her legal career practicing in her hometown of Newcastle. During this period, she was a member of the Electoral Court during the first post-apartheid elections of 1994, a commissioner in Small Claims Court from 1998 to 2003, vice-president of the KwaZulu-Natal Law Society from 2006 to 2007, and a legal advisor to the Newcastle Local Municipality from 2005 to 2010. She was also invited to serve as an acting judge in the Pietermaritzburg High Court in 2005–2006 and in 2010–2011.

== KwaZulu-Natal High Court: 2011–2019 ==
In May 2011, President Jacob Zuma appointed Mbatha permanently to the KwaZulu-Natal High Court; she joined the bench on 1 June 2011. Among the high-profile cases before Mbatha was State v Ngubane and Others, in which nine men were convicted of killing three people during a spree of ATM bombings in KwaZulu-Natal. In October 2016, Mbatha sentenced them to lengthy prison sentences, including three life sentences. However, the convictions were overturned on appeal, with the appellate judges raising serious concerns about the quality of the evidence against the defendants; among other things, they noted that the prosecutor had himself admitted in argument that there was insufficient evidence to convict three of the men.

During her eight years on the High Court, Mbatha spent almost a full year as an acting judge in the Supreme Court of Appeal from December 2016 to November 2017. In this capacity, in 2017, she wrote a minority judgement in Mahaeeane and Another v AngloGold Ashanti Ltd, a case in which silicosis-affected mineworkers sought health and safety records from their former employer, AngloGold Ashanti; Mbatha dissented from the majority's interpretation of the requirements of the Promotion of Access to Information Act. Also during this period, Mbatha joined the South African chapter of the International Association of Women Judges in 2017, and she served as the organisation's provincial coordinator for KwaZulu-Natal between 2018 and 2020.

In April 2018, the Judicial Service Commission shortlisted and interviewed Mbatha as one of nine candidates for three permanent positions on the Supreme Court of Appeal, but her candidacy did not succeed. Much of the interview centred on Mbatha's sentencing decision in S v Ngubane.

== Supreme Court of Appeal: 2019–present ==
In February 2019, the Judicial Service Commission shortlisted Mbatha again for permanent appointment to one of five new vacancies on the Supreme Court of Appeal. On that occasion, her interview was unusually brief – less than 20 minutes – and the Commission recommended her for appointment. After her appointment was confirmed by President Cyril Ramaphosa, she joined the Supreme Court of Appeal on 1 June 2019. She was an acting judge in the Constitutional Court between August and December 2022.
