= Murder of Masego Kgomo =

South African murder victim

Masego Kgomo
- Born: c. 1999
- Disappeared: 31 December 2009; Soshanguve, Gauteng
- Died: 31 December 2009 (aged 10); Soshanguve, Gauteng
- Body discovered: 9 January 2010; Soshanguve, Gauteng
- Resting place: Zandfontein Cemetery
- Parent(s): Joseph and Kate Kgomo

Masego Kgomo (c. 1999 – 31 December 2009) was a South African girl murdered in order to provide body parts for rituals performed by a sangoma. Her murder sparked calls for sangomas to stop using human flesh for rituals.

Kgomo went missing near her home in Soshanguve, a township north of Pretoria, on 31 December 2009. Five people were initially charged with her kidnapping and murder. A suspect led police to Kgomo's body in Soshanguve in the early hours of 9 January 2010.

On 28 November 2011, Judge Billy Mothle found 30-year-old Brian Mangwale guilty of her murder and kidnapping in the Pretoria High Court. Mangwale was sentenced to life imprisonment for her murder and six years imprisonment for her kidnapping.

== See also ==
- List of kidnappings
- Muti killings
