= Johnny Smith (disambiguation) =

Johnny Smith (1922–2013) was an American jazz guitarist.

Johnny Smith or Jonny Smith may also refer to:

== People ==
- Johnny Smith (baseball) (fl. 1940s), Negro leagues baseball player
- Johnny Smith (rugby league) (1923–2007), Australian rugby league footballer of the 1940s
- Johnny Smith (rugby union) (1922–1974), Maori rugby union player who played for New Zealand
- Johnny Smith (wrestler) (born 1965), British professional wrestler
- Johnny "Hammond" Smith (1933–1997), American soul jazz and hard bop organist

== Other ==
- Johnny Smith (album), by jazz guitarist Johnny Smith
- Johnny Smith (The Dead Zone), the protagonist of Stephen King's 1979 novel The Dead Zone

== See also ==
- John Smith (disambiguation)
