= Supreme Court of Appeal (South Africa) =

National court beneath the Constitutional Court of South Africa

- List: 10 other official names: Hoogste Hof van Appèl (Afrikaans); iKhotho ePhakemeko yezokuBuyekezwa (Southern Ndebele); iNkundla ePhakamileyo yeziBheno (Xhosa); Inkantolo ephakeme yokwedluliswa kwamacala (Zulu); iNkantolo lePhakeme yekweNdlulisela emacala (Swazi); Kgorokgolo ya Tsheko ya Boipiletšo (Northern Sotho); Lekgotla le Phahameng la Boipiletso (Sotho); Kgotlatshekelokgolo ya Boikuelo (Tswana); Khotonkulu yo Endla Xikombelo (Tsonga); Khothe Khulwane ya Khaṱhululo (Venda)
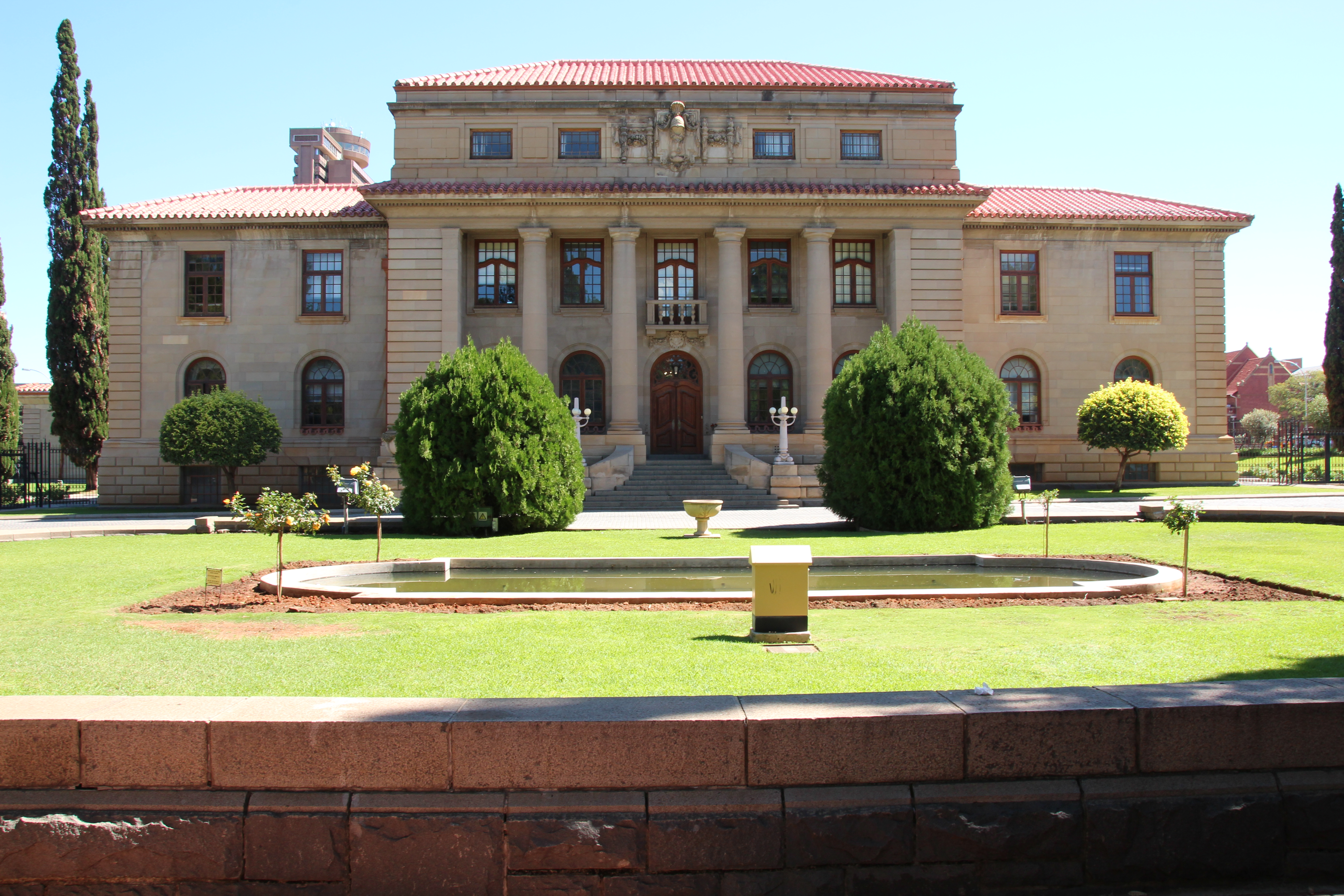
- Building of the Supreme Court of Appeal in Bloemfontein
- Interactive map of Supreme Court of Appeal
- 29.1154°S 26.2163°E
- Established: 1910 (Appellate Division)
- Jurisdiction: South Africa
- Location: Bloemfontein
- Coordinates: 29.1154°S 26.2163°E
- Composition method: Presidential appointment on the advice of the Judicial Service Commission
- Authorised by: Chapter 8 of the Constitution; Superior Courts Act, 2013
- Appeals to: Constitutional Court
- Number of positions: 25
- Website: www.supremecourtofappeal.org.za

President
- Currently: Mahube Molemela
- Since: 1 June 2023

Deputy President
- Currently: Dumisani Zondi
- Since: 10 July 2024

The Supreme Court of Appeal (SCA), formerly known as the Appellate Division, is the second-highest court of appeal in South Africa below the Constitutional Court. The country's apex court from 1910 to 1994, it no longer holds that position, having been displaced in constitutional matters by the Constitutional Court in 1994, and in all matters by 2013. It is located in Bloemfontein. Bloemfontein is often seen as, and has been traditionally referred to as, the "judicial capital" of South Africa because of the court, although the Constitutional Court is based in Johannesburg.

== History ==
On the creation of the Union of South Africa from four British colonies in 1910, the supreme courts of the colonies became provincial divisions of the new Supreme Court of South Africa, and the Appellate Division was created as a purely appellate court superior to the provincial divisions. It was the seat of some of the country's most outstanding judges, including Innes CJ, Watermeyer CJ, Galgut JA, Wessels CJ and Schreiner JA.

In 1994 the Constitutional Court of South Africa was created with jurisdiction superior to the Appellate Division, but it could hear only in constitutional matters. The Appellate Division, therefore, remained the highest court in non-constitutional matters. In 1997 the Appellate Division became the Supreme Court of Appeal and was given constitutional jurisdiction, though the system of two apex courts remained: the Constitutional Court was the country's highest court in constitutional matters, but the SCA was the highest court in non-constitutional matters. However, the Constitutional Court took a broad reading of its jurisdiction, and in August 2013 the position was regularised by an amendment to the South African Constitution which gave the Constitutional Court general jurisdiction.

== Current judges ==
The court is composed of a President, a Deputy President, and the number of ordinary Judges of Appeal determined in terms of an Act of Parliament; at present there are 23 ordinary positions on the court. Cases before the court are generally heard by panels of five judges.

Judges are appointed by the President of South Africa on the advice of the Judicial Service Commission. Judges of Appeal are cited in judgments with the surname of the judge followed by "JA". (The President and Deputy President are cited with a "P" and "DP" respectively, and acting judges are cited with "AJA".)

As of July 2024, the Judges of Appeal were:

- Mahube Molemela (President)
- Dumisani Zondi (Deputy President)
- Nathan Ponnan
- Nambitha Dambuza
- Baratang Mocumie
- Tati Makgoka
- Ashton Schippers
- Fikile Mokgohloa
- Caroline Nicholls
- Yvonne Mbatha
- Billy Mothle
- Wendy Hughes
- Nolwazi Mabindla-Boqwana
- Piet Meyer
- Keoagile Matojane
- Sharise Weiner
- Glenn Goosen
- Daisy Molefe
- Shane Kgoele
- Fayeeza Kathree-Setiloane
- John Smith
- Raylene Keightley
- David Unterhalter

== List of presidents ==
Presidents of the Supreme Court of Appeal
| № | Incumbent | Tenure |
|---|---|---|
| – | J. J. F. Hefer (acting) | 2002 – 2003 |
| 1. | C. T. Howie | 2003 – 2008 |
| 2. | L. Mpati | 2008 – 2016 |
| 3. | M. M. L. Maya | 2016 – 2022 |
| – | X. M. Petse (acting) | 2022 – 2023 |
| 4. | M. B. Molemela | 2023 – present |

== List of deputy presidents ==
Deputy presidents of the Supreme Court of Appeal
| № | Incumbent | Tenure |
|---|---|---|
| 1. | L. Mpati | 2003 – 2008 |
| 2. | L. T. C. Harms | 2008 – 2011 |
| 3. | K. K. Mthiyane | 2012 – 2014 |
| – | M. S. Navsa (acting) | 2015 – 2015 |
| 4. | M. M. L. Maya | 2015 – 2017 |
| – | J. B. Z. Shongwe (acting) | 2017 – 2018 |
| 5. | X. M. Petse | 2019 – 2024 |
| – | N. Dambuza (acting) | 2022 – 2023 |
| 6. | D. Zondi | 2024 – present |

== List of judges of appeal ==
This is a list of all the judges who have served in the Supreme Court of Appeal since its inception in 1997.

Appointments to the Appellate Division:

The following judges were appointed to the Appellate Division but continued to serve on the bench in the Supreme Court of Appeal after 1997.

- Hennie van Heerden (appointed in 1982, retired in 2001)
- Joos Hefer (appointed in 1984, retired in 2001)
- Ernie Grosskopf (appointed in 1985, retired in 1998)
- John Smalberger (appointed in 1985, retired in 2002)
- Werner Vivier (appointed in 1986, retired in 2003)
- Frans Grosskopf (appointed in 1988, retired in 2001)
- Peet Nienaber (appointed in 1990, retired in 2002)
- Louis Harms (appointed in 1993, retired in 2008)
- Craig Howie (appointed in 1993, retired in 2008)
- Robin Marais (appointed in 1995, retired in 2004)
- Pierre Olivier (appointed in 1995, died in 2003)
- Peter Schutz (appointed in 1995, died in 2004)
- Douglas Scott (appointed in 1995, retired in 2008)
- Ralph Zulman (appointed in 1996, retired in 2007)
- Chris Plewman (appointed in 1996, retired in 2000)

Appointments by President Nelson Mandela:

- Ismail Mahomed (appointed in 1997, died in 2000)
- Piet Streicher (appointed in 1997, retired in 2010)

Appointments by President Thabo Mbeki:

- Ian Farlam (appointed in 2000, retired in 2009)
- Edwin Cameron (appointed in 2000, elevated in 2008)
- Mahomed Navsa (appointed in 2000, retired in 2022)
- Lex Mpati (appointed in 2000, retired in 2016)
- Kenneth Mthiyane (appointed in 2001, retired in 2014)
- Fritz Brand (appointed in 2001, retired in 2015)
- Robert Nugent (appointed in 2002, retired in 2013)
- Johan Conradie (appointed in 2002, retired in 2007)
- Tom Cloete (appointed in 2003, retired in 2012)
- Carole Lewis (appointed in 2003, retired in 2019)
- John Heher (appointed in 2003, retired in 2012)
- Belinda van Heerden (appointed in 2004, retired in 2013)
- Nathan Ponnan (appointed in 2004)
- Chris Jafta (appointed in 2005, elevated in 2009)
- Dunstan Mlambo (appointed in 2005, transferred in 2010)
- Mandisa Maya (appointed in 2005, elevated in 2022)
- Peter Carl Combrinck (appointed in 2007, retired in 2008)
- Azhar Cachalia (appointed in 2007, retired in 2021)

Appointments by President Kgalema Motlanthe:

- Suretta Snyders (appointed in 2008, died in 2014)
- Nonkosi Mhlantla (appointed in 2008, elevated in 2015)

Appointments by President Jacob Zuma:

- Frans Malan (appointed in 2009, retired in 2013)
- Ronnie Bosielo (appointed in 2009, died in 2018)
- Jeremiah Shongwe (appointed in 2009, retired in 2018)
- Eric Leach (appointed in 2009, retired in 2020)
- Zukisa Tshiqi (appointed in 2009, elevated in 2019)
- Leona Theron (appointed in 2010, elevated in 2017)
- Steven Majiedt (appointed in 2010, elevated in 2019)
- Willie Seriti (appointed in 2010, retired in 2019)
- Malcolm Wallis (appointed in 2011, retired in 2021)
- Xola Petse (appointed in 2012, retired in 2024)
- Nigel Willis (appointed in 2013, retired in 2018)
- Halima Saldulker (appointed in 2013, retired in 2023)
- Kevin Swain (appointed in 2014, retired in 2020)
- Boissie Mbha (appointed in 2014, retired in 2022)
- Dumisani Zondi (appointed in 2014)
- Nambitha Dambuza (appointed in 2015)
- Rammaka Mathopo (appointed in 2015, elevated in 2021)
- Ian van der Merwe (appointed in 2016, retired in 2023)
- Connie Mocumie (appointed in 2016)

Appointments by President Cyril Ramaphosa:

- Tati Makgoka (appointed in 2018)
- Mahube Molemela (appointed in 2018)
- Ashton Schippers (appointed in 2018)
- Fikile Mokgohloa (appointed in 2019, died in 2026)
- Clive Plasket (appointed in 2019, retired in 2022)
- Daniel Dlodlo (appointed in 2019, retired in 2022)
- Caroline Nicholls (appointed in 2019)
- Thokozile Mbatha (appointed in 2019)
- Trevor Gorven (appointed in 2021, retired in 2024)
- Zeenat Carelse (appointed in 2021, elevated in 2024)
- Billy Mothle (appointed in 2021)
- Wendy Hughes (appointed in 2021)
- Nolwazi Mabindla-Boqwana (appointed in 2021)
- Piet Meyer (appointed in 2022)
- Elias Matojane (appointed in 2022)
- Sharise Weiner (appointed in 2022)
- Glenn Goosen (appointed in 2022)
- Daisy Molefe (appointed in 2022)
- Shane Kgoele (appointed in 2023)
- Fayeeza Kathree-Setiloane (appointed in 2023)
- John Smith (appointed in 2024)
- Raylene Keightley (appointed in 2024)
- David Unterhalter (appointed in 2024)

== See also ==
- Supreme Court of Appeal of South Africa cases
