= Mahube Molemela =

South African judge (born 1965)

The Honourable Mahube Molemela

President of the Supreme Court of Appeal
- Incumbent
- Assumed office 1 June 2023
- Appointed by: Cyril Ramaphosa
- Deputy: Xola Petse
- Preceded by: Xola Petse (acting); Mandisa Maya

Judge of the Supreme Court of Appeal
- Incumbent
- Assumed office 1 June 2018
- Appointed by: Cyril Ramaphosa

Former Chancellor of the Central University of Technology
- Incumbent
- Assumed office 10 June 2016
- Preceded by: Boet Troskie
Prior appointments
Judge President of the Free State High Court
In office 1 January 2015 – 31 May 2018
Appointed by	Jacob Zuma
Deputy	Cagney Musi
Preceded by	Thekiso Musi
Succeeded by	Cagney Musi
Judge of the Labour Court of Appeal
In office 1 June 2014 – 31 May 2018
Appointed by	Jacob Zuma
Judge of the High Court
In office 1 July 2008 – 31 May 2018
Appointed by	Thabo Mbeki
Division	Free State

Personal details
- Born: Mahube Betty Eister; 18 March 1965 (age 61) Bloemfontein, Orange Free State; Republic of South Africa
- Spouse: Sello Molemela
- Education: University of Fort Hare; University of the Free State

Mahube Betty Molemela (née Eister; born 18 March 1965) is a South African judge who has been the President of the Supreme Court of Appeal since 1 June 2023. Before her appointment to the Supreme Court in June 2018, she was the first woman Judge President of the Free State High Court from 2015 to 2018. A former attorney, she was appointed to the bench in the Free State in July 2008.

== Early life and education ==
Molemela was born on 18 March 1965 in Bloemfontein in the former Orange Free State, now the Free State. She matriculated in 1981 at Albert Moroka High School in Thaba Nchu outside Bloemfontein, and she subsequently enrolled at the University of Fort Hare, where she completed her BA and BProc degrees. She later completed an LLB and an LLM in mercantile law from the University of the Free State.

== Career as an attorney ==
Molemela began her legal career in 1987 as a prosecutor at the magistrate's court in Thaba Nchu. She went on to complete her articles at E. G. Cooper & Sons and Peete Jake Moloi Attorneys and gained admittance as an attorney in 1993.

After being admitted, Molemela practiced as an attorney for 15 years at several different firms in Bloemfontein, Phuthaditjhaba, and Johannesburg. She was admitted as a conveyancer and notary in 1996, and she was an arbitrator at the Commission for Conciliation, Mediation and Arbitration from 1999 to 2001 and a part-time law lecturer at the University of the Free State from 2001 to 2003. In addition, while practicing, Molemela occasionally sat on the bench: she was a military judge in 2004, and she was an acting judge of the High Court of South Africa on several occasions – in the Free State High Court for periods in 2005, 2006, and 2007, and then in the Johannesburg High Court from November 2007 to March 2008.

== Free State High Court: 2008–2018 ==
In July 2008, Molemela was appointed permanently to the bench of the Free State High Court. During her later years on the bench, from 2012 to 2014, she was seconded as an acting judge in the Labour Appeal Court and Competition Appeal Court. On 1 June 2014, she began a ten-year term as a permanent judge of the Labour Appeal Court, appointed by President Jacob Zuma.

Soon afterwards, in October 2014, the Judicial Service Commission recommended her promotion to become Judge President of the Free State High Court, and she took office on 1 January 2015. She was the second woman judge president in South Africa, after Monica Leeuw of the North West High Court, and the first in the Free State. During her tenure as Judge President, she was seconded as an acting judge to the Constitutional Court from January to May 2015 and as an acting judge to the Supreme Court of Appeal from December 2016 to September 2017.

High-profile High Court cases handled by Molemela included two relating to the African National Congress (ANC), the governing party. She presided over a case concerning a right-wing conspiracy to disrupt the party's 53rd National Conference in 2012, and in 2017, she nullified the results of a Free State ANC elective conference, which had implications for voting at the party's 54th National Conference and which had the effect of stripping Ace Magashule of his party office.

== Supreme Court of Appeal: 2018–present ==
On 10 April 2018, Molemela was interviewed by the Judicial Service Commission for appointment to the Supreme Court of Appeal in Bloemfontein. She was one of three candidates recommended by the commission for appointment, and President Cyril Ramaphosa appointed her to the bench with effect from 1 June 2018. Several dissenting judgements written by Molemela at the Supreme Court were later upheld by the Constitutional Court.

=== Constitutional Court nominations: 2020–2022 ===
During her time at the Supreme Court, Molemela was twice shortlisted for promotion to the Constitutional Court. She was first nominated to the shortlist in February 2020, although the interviews were delayed by the COVID-19 pandemic and were not held until April 2021. During her interview, on 13 April, members of the Judicial Service Commission expressed concern about Molemela's rapid ascension through the ranks of the judiciary, with Chief Justice Mogoeng Mogoeng asking her, "Why does it look like you can't stay in one place, to influence that place significantly, before you can move on? Why do you appear to be moving so soon after elevation to a particular position?"

The Judicial Service Commission did not recommend Molemela for appointment in April, but the appointment process was subsequently rerun following a court challenge by the Council for the Advancement of the South African Constitution. Molemela was therefore interviewed again in October 2021, and on that occasion she was one of five candidates recommended for appointment. However, there were only three vacancies on the Constitutional Court, and Molemela was not appointed.

In March 2022, Molemela was nominated to the shortlist for two new vacancies at the Constitutional Court. Following her interview in April 2022, the Judicial Service Commission again recommended her for appointment, and the President again declined to appoint her.

=== President of the Supreme Court: 2023–present ===
In February 2023, the Presidency announced that Molemela was President Ramaphosa's sole nominee to replace Mandisa Maya as President of the Supreme Court of Appeal. She was interviewed by the Judicial Service Commission on 17 April, and the Daily Maverick reported that her interview went well, with Chief Justice Raymond Zondo complimenting her judicial record and Molemela "mostly [holding] her ground solidly, though some will have perceived a certain degree of fence-sitting... relating to her personal jurisprudential philosophy."

The Commission recommended her appointment soon after the interview. The recommendation was welcomed by opposition political parties, by the non-profit Judges Matter, and by the General Council of the Bar, which complimented her "deep and thorough knowledge of the law, including constitutional law".

Molemela took office as President of the Supreme Court on 1 June 2023, taking over from Xola Petse, who acted as president after Mandisa Maya's departure. She is the second woman president, Maya having been the first.

== Academic appointments ==
Molemela formerly served on the council of the Central University of Technology (CUT) in Bloemfontein, and on 10 June 2016 she was appointed as Chancellor of CUT.

In June 2019, Molemela was awarded an honorary LLD by her alma mater, the University of the Free State.

== Personal life ==
She is married to Sello Molemela; her father-in-law, Rantlai Petrus "Whitehead" Molemela, was the owner of Bloemfontein Celtic and a well-known figure in Bloemfontein. They have two children. Molemela is also a marathon runner and is a member of the Catholic Women's League and International Association of Women Judges.
