= Xola Petse =

South African judge (born 1954)

The Honourable Xola Petse

Deputy President of the Supreme Court of Appeal
- In office 1 June 2019 – 10 July 2024
- Appointed by: Cyril Ramaphosa
- President: Mandisa Maya; Mahube Molemela
- Preceded by: Mandisa Maya
- Succeeded by: Dumisani Zondi

Judge of the Supreme Court of Appeal
- In office 1 June 2012 – 10 July 2024
- Appointed by: Jacob Zuma

Judge of the High Court
- In office 10 July 2005 – 31 May 2012
- Appointed by: Thabo Mbeki
- Division: Eastern Cape

Personal details
- Born: Xola Mlungisi Petse; 10 July 1954 (age 72) Mqanduli, Cape Province; Union of South Africa
- Education: University of Fort Hare; University of Natal

Xola Mlungisi Petse (born 10 July 1954) is a retired South African judge who was the Deputy President of the Supreme Court of Appeal between 2019 and 2024. A former attorney, he joined the Supreme Court as a puisne judge in June 2012. Before that, he was a judge of the Eastern Cape High Court from July 2005 to May 2012.

== Early life and career ==
Petse was born on 10 July 1954 in Qokolweni, a village in Mqanduli in the Eastern Cape. After matriculating at Bensonvale High School in Sterkspruit in 1972, he worked for two years as a clerk in the Department of Justice of the Transkei bantustan. He resigned in 1975 in order to study law at the University of Fort Hare, where he completed a BProc in 1978. Later, in 1989, he obtained an LLB from the University of Natal's Pietermaritzburg campus.

Between 1982 and 2005, Petse practised as an attorney in the Eastern Cape. He was one of the few admitted notaries in the Transkei and often represented anti-apartheid activists.

== Eastern Cape High Court: 2005–2012 ==
On 10 July 2005, Petse was appointed as a judge of the Eastern Cape Division of the High Court of South Africa, based at Mthatha. He spent close to seven years in that court.

== Supreme Court of Appeal: 2012–present ==
In April 2012, Petse was one of five candidates shortlisted and interviewed for possible appointment to one of two vacancies at the Supreme Court of Appeal. He was viewed as one of the frontrunners, but his interview with the Judicial Service Commission was rigorous and included a prolonged debate with commissioner Fatima Chohan about the separation of powers. He and Ronnie Pillay were the Judicial Service Commission's recommendations for appointment, and President Jacob Zuma appointed them to the Supreme Court bench with effect from 1 June 2012.

=== Secondment to the Constitutional Court: 2018 ===
In 2018, Petse was an acting justice of the Constitutional Court of South Africa, and he wrote several judgements for the court. Among them were Mlungwana v State, a unanimous judgement (also known as SJC10) which ruled that the constitutional right to freedom of assembly was incompatible with provisions of the Regulation of Gatherings Act which required protestors to provide adequate notice before assembling, and Maledu v Itereleng Bakgatla Mineral Resources, a unanimous judgement concerning a conflict between informal land rights under the Interim Protection of Informal Land Rights Act and mining rights granted in terms of the Mineral and Petroleum Resources Development Act.

=== Deputy President: 2019–2024 ===
On 2 February 2019, President Cyril Ramaphosa announced that Petse was his sole nominee to fill the vacant position of Deputy President of the Supreme Court of Appeal. Following an interview in April, the Judicial Service Commission endorsed the nomination, and Ramaphosa finalised his appointment in June. As Deputy President, Petse succeeded Mandisa Maya, who had been elevated to the court's presidency.

In February 2021, Petse chaired the Judicial Service Commission's interview process in the search for a new Chief Justice; he was one of the few senior judges who was not in the running for the position. Many observers, including Dumisa Ntsebeza and Hugh Corder, criticised him for allowing the proceedings to be diverted by inappropriate questions and unsubstantiated allegations. In subsequent months, Maya was appointed as Deputy Chief Justice, and the National Association of Democratic Lawyers publicly endorsed Petse to succeed her permanently as Supreme Court President. However, both Mondli Makhanya and the Daily Maverick speculated that his performance at the Judicial Service Commission had likely harmed his chances. President Ramaphosa nominated Mahube Molemela instead, and Petse was criticised for questioning Molemela's interpersonal skills during her confirmation hearing in April 2023. He stayed on as her deputy when she took office as Supreme Court President in June 2023, though he retired upon his seventieth birthday in July 2024.

== Personal life ==
He is married to Sbongile Sybil Petse and has three children. He was formerly the chancellor of the Anglican Diocese of Mbhashe in the Eastern Cape.
