= Western Cape High Court =

Superior court of law in the Western Cape, South Africa

Western Cape Division of the High Court of South Africa
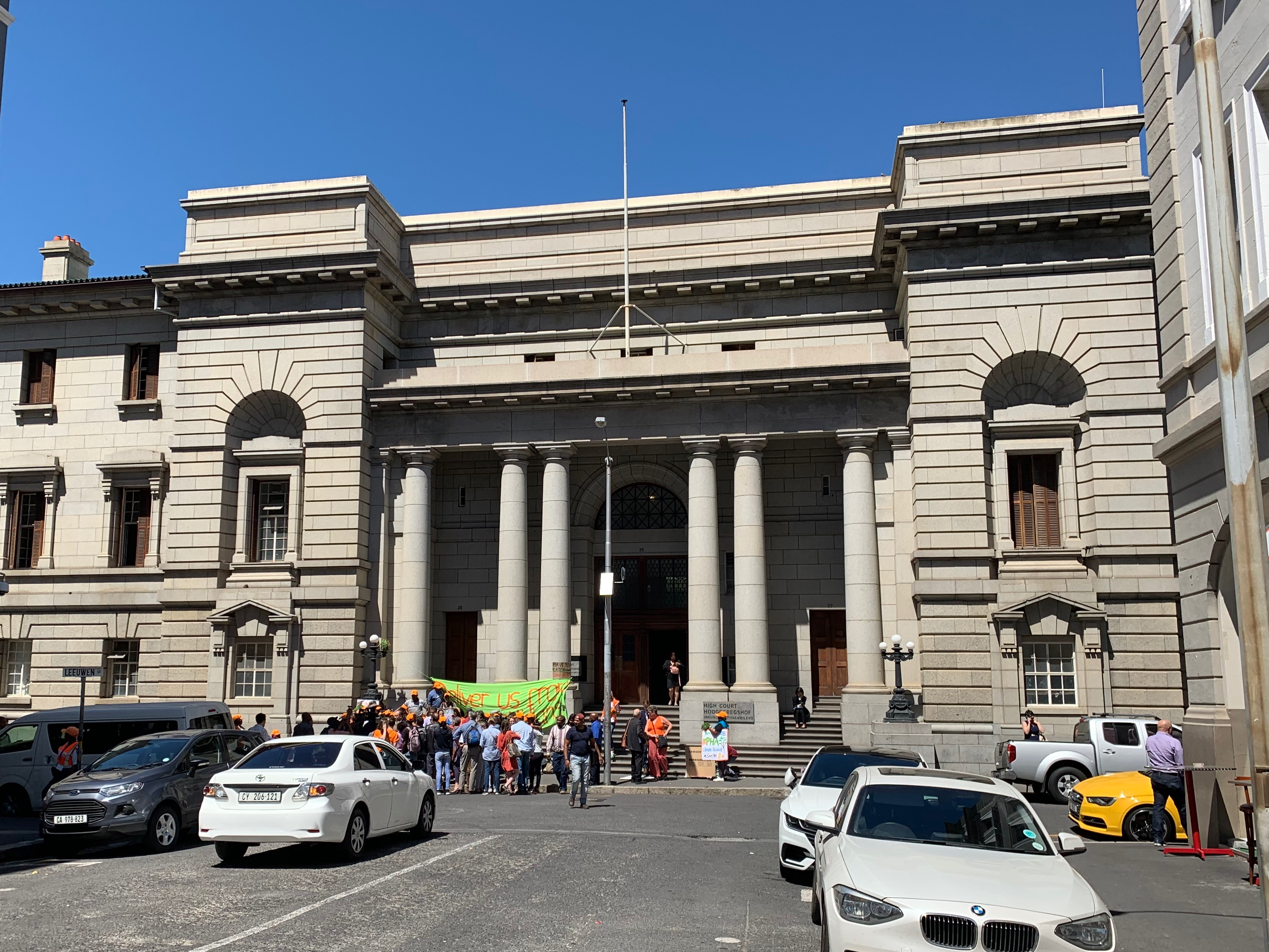
- Interactive map of Western Cape Division of the High Court of South Africa
- 33°55′30″S 18°25′4″E
- Established: 1 January 1828 (Supreme Court of the Cape Colony)
- Jurisdiction: Western Cape, South Africa
- Location: Cape Town
- Coordinates: 33°55′30″S 18°25′4″E
- Composition method: Presidential appointment on the advice of the Judicial Service Commission
- Authorised by: Chp. 8 of the Constitution; Superior Courts Act, 2013
- Appeals to: Supreme Court of Appeal or Constitutional Court
- Number of positions: 33

Judge President
- Currently: Nolwazi Mabindla-Boqwana
- Since: 2023

The Western Cape High Court (in full the Western Cape Division of the High Court of South Africa) is a superior court of law with general jurisdiction over the Western Cape province of South Africa. The division, which sits at Cape Town, consists of 33 judges led by Judge President Nolwazi Mabindla-Boqwana.

== History ==
Historical changes in the area of jurisdiction of the Western Cape Division

The origins of the Western Cape Division lie in the Supreme Court of the Colony of the Cape of Good Hope, which was established on 1 January 1828 as the highest court of the Cape Colony. It was created by the First Charter of Justice, letters patent issued by George IV on 24 August 1827. Upon the creation of the Union of South Africa in 1910, the Supreme Court of the Cape Colony was transformed by the South Africa Act 1909 into the Cape of Good Hope Provincial Division of the new Supreme Court of South Africa.

In 1910 the Cape Provincial Division (CPD) had jurisdiction over the whole of the Cape Province. The Eastern Districts Local Division at Grahamstown shared concurrent jurisdiction over the eastern parts of the province, while the Griqualand West Local Division at Kimberley shared concurrent jurisdiction over the northern parts. In 1957 the Grahamstown court was renamed the Eastern Cape Division and elevated to the status of a provincial division independent of the CPD. In 1969 the Kimberley court was similarly elevated as the Northern Cape Division.

When the final Constitution of South Africa came into force in 1997, the Cape of Good Hope Division of the Supreme Court became a High Court. In 2003, in terms of the Interim Rationalisation of Jurisdiction of High Courts Act, 2001, the area of jurisdiction of the Cape High Court was modified to coincide with the boundaries of the Western Cape province. The Renaming of High Courts Act, 2008 renamed it to the "Western Cape High Court, Cape Town". In 2013, in the restructuring brought about by the Superior Courts Act, it became the Western Cape Division of the High Court of South Africa.

== Judges ==
The Western Cape Division has a complement of 33 judges. Judges are addressed as "the Honourable Justice", or just "My Lord" or "My Lady". As of 2012 the judges are:

- Nolwazi Mabindla-Boqwana (Judge President)
- Patricia Goliath (Deputy Judge President)
- André Le Grange
- Rosheni Allie
- Elizabeth Baartman
- Ashley Binns-Ward
- André Blignault
- Leonard Bozalek
- Dennis Davis
- Siraj Desai
- Daniel Dlodlo
- Nathan Erasmus
- Chantal Fortuin
- Burton Fourie
- Patric Gamble
- Barend Griesel
- Robert Henney
- Willem Louw
- Shenaaz Meer
- Tandazwa Ndita
- Vincent Saldanha
- Monde Samela
- Elize Steyn
- Anton Veldhuizen
- Basheer Waglay
- James Yekiso
- Dumisani Zondi
- Melanie Holderness
- Mas-udah Pangarker
- Nontuthuzelo Ralarala

There are currently two vacant seats on the Bench.

== Circuits ==
The rural districts of the Western Cape, outside of the Cape Town metropolitan area, are divided into circuits. Judges of the division travel the circuits at least twice a year.

- The Western Circuit sits in Vredendal and Vanrhynsdorp, and hears cases from the West Coast.
- The Northern Circuit sits in Worcester and Beaufort West, and hears cases from the upper Breede River Valley and the Great Karoo.
- The Eastern Circuit sits in George, Mossel Bay, Knysna and Oudtshoorn, and hears cases from the Garden Route and the Little Karoo.
- The Southern Circuit sits in Swellendam and hears cases from the Overberg and the lower Breede River Valley.
- The Cape Circuit sits in Paarl and Stellenbosch, and hears only criminal cases from the Boland and the Helderberg.
