= Mandisa Maya =

Chief Justice of South Africa (born 1964)

The Honourable Mandisa Maya
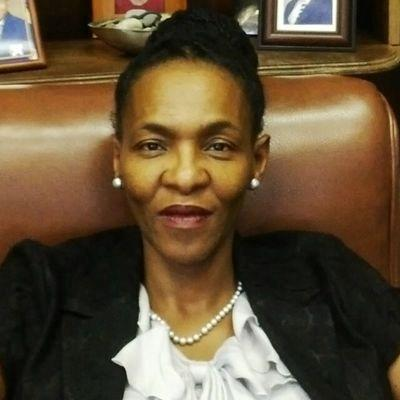
- Maya in chambers in Bloemfontein, 2015

23rd Chief Justice of South Africa
- Incumbent
- Assumed office 1 September 2024
- Appointed by: Cyril Ramaphosa
- Deputy: Mbuyiseli Madlanga (Acting); Dunstan Mlambo
- Preceded by: Raymond Zondo

8th Deputy Chief Justice of South Africa
- In office 1 September 2022 – 31 August 2024
- Appointed by: Cyril Ramaphosa
- Chief Justice: Raymond Zondo
- Preceded by: Raymond Zondo
- Succeeded by: Dunstan Mlambo

3rd President of the Supreme Court of Appeal
- In office 26 May 2017 – 31 August 2022
- Appointed by: Jacob Zuma
- Deputy: Xola Petse
- Preceded by: Lex Mpati
- Succeeded by: Mahube Molemela

4th Deputy President of the Supreme Court of Appeal of South Africa
- In office 23 September 2015 – 1 September 2022
- Appointed by: Jacob Zuma
- President: Lex Mpati
- Preceded by: Kenneth Mthiyane
- Succeeded by: Xola Petse

Judge of the Supreme Court of Appeal
- In office June 2006 – 31 August 2022
- Appointed by: Thabo Mbeki

Judge of the High Court
- In office 1 May 2000 – June 2006
- Appointed by: Thabo Mbeki
- Division: Transkei

Chancellor of the University of Mpumalanga
- Incumbent
- Assumed office 1 July 2021
- Vice-Chancellor: Thoko Mayekiso
- Preceded by: Cyril Ramaphosa

Personal details
- Born: Mandisa Muriel Lindelwa Maya; 20 March 1964 (age 62) St Cuthbert's, Tsolo; Cape Province, South Africa
- Spouse: Dabulamnazi Mlokoti
- Children: 3
- Education: University of Transkei (BProc); University of Natal (LLB); Duke University (LLM)

Mandisa Muriel Lindelwa Maya (born 20 March 1964) is the chief justice of South Africa. She was formerly the president of the Supreme Court of Appeal from 2017 to 2022 before she was elevated to the position of deputy chief justice of South Africa in September 2022. She joined the bench in May 2000 as a judge of the Transkei Division of the High Court of South Africa and was elevated to the Supreme Court of Appeal in 2006.

Born in the Eastern Cape, Maya began her legal career in the Transkei, working as a prosecutor and state law adviser until she was admitted as an advocate in 1994. President Thabo Mbeki appointed her to the Mthatha High Court in May 2000 and to the Supreme Court of Appeal in June 2006. In the appellate court, she was elevated to the deputy presidency in September 2015 and the presidency in May 2017, succeeding Lex Mpati in both positions. She was the first black woman to serve in the Supreme Court of Appeal, as well as the court's first woman deputy president and first woman president.

Maya was nominated unsuccessfully for elevation to the Constitutional Court in 2009 and 2012, and President Cyril Ramaphosa controversially declined to confirm her nomination as Chief Justice of South Africa in March 2022. In September 2022, however, Ramaphosa appointed her as the first woman Deputy Chief Justice, in which capacity she deputised Raymond Zondo. She was the president of the South African chapter of the International Association of Women Judges from 2018 to 2023, and she was appointed as the Chancellor of the University of Mpumalanga on 1 July 2021.

In July 2024, Ramaphosa appointed Maya as South Africa's first female Chief Justice, effective 1 September 2024.

== Early life and education ==
Maya was born on 20 March 1964 in St Cuthbert's, a rural area of Tsolo in the Transkei region of the Eastern Cape. She was the eldest of six children born to Sandile and Nombulelo Maya, who were both teachers. Her home language is IsiXhosa.

Her family moved to King William's Town in 1966 after her father got a job with Radio Bantu, and she attended school there until 1977, when, due to the disruptive effects of the Soweto uprising, she was sent to attend school in Mthatha. She matriculated in 1981 at St John's College, Mthatha.

== Legal education and career ==
When Maya enrolled in the University of Transkei, she intended to register for a degree in medicine but was put off by a forensic medicine textbook that she happened to leaf through on registration day. She studied towards a BProc instead, graduating in 1986. Thereafter she attended the University of Natal, completing an LLB in 1988. She also clerked at the Mthatha firm of Dazana Mafungo Inc, between 1987 and 1988, and after graduation she took up work at the magistrate's court in Mthatha, where she was a court interpreter and then a public prosecutor.

In 1989, Maya moved to Durham, North Carolina to attend Duke University School of Law on a Fulbright Scholarship, studying labour law, alternative dispute resolution, and constitutional law. She later said that it was "mind-blowing" to leave apartheid-era South Africa for Duke. After she graduated in 1990 with an LLM, she worked as policy counsel at the Women's Legal Defense Fund in Washington, D. C. from 1990 to 1991.

Upon her return to South Africa, Maya was an assistant state law adviser in Mthatha from 1991 to 1993, during which time she was also a part-time lecturer in law at the University of Transkei. In 1993, she moved to Johannesburg to serve her pupillage, though she returned to the Transkei to practice after she was admitted as an advocate in 1994. She practised at the Transkei Bar for five years. According to Maya, she struggled to get briefs during her early years as an advocate and her practice depended on referrals from friends, particularly Nambitha Dambuza.

In 1999, she was appointed as an acting judge in the Mthatha High Court, the seat of the Transkei Division of the High Court of South Africa. She later said that Dumisa Ntsebeza had encouraged her to join the bench.

== Transkei Division: 2000–2006 ==
On 1 May 2000, Maya joined the bench permanently as a judge of the Transkei Division. She also served as an acting judge in the Labour Court, the Bhisho High Court (Ciskei Division), and the Grahamstown and Port Elizabeth High Courts (Eastern Cape Division). In February 2005, she was appointed as an acting judge in the Supreme Court of Appeal, and she remained at that court in Bloemfontein for over a year, until she was elevated permanently the following year.

== Supreme Court of Appeal: 2006–2022 ==
On 12 May 2006, on the advice of the Judicial Service Commission, President Thabo Mbeki appointed Maya to a permanent seat in the Supreme Court of Appeal. She took office in June 2006. She was one of three women serving on the appellate bench at the time, the others being Judges Carole Lewis and Belinda van Heerden, and the first black woman ever to gain appointment as a judge of appeal. She later remembered that she had been refused entrance to the courthouse on her first day, by a gardener who thought she was lost, and she said that, among her colleagues on the bench, "There are those who ignored me and showed in subtle and not so subtle ways I had no place in being here."

By the end of her tenure in the Supreme Court, Maya had over 200 reported judgments. Her notable opinions included a dissent in Minister of Safety and Security v F: while the majority held that the state could not be held vicariously liable for a minor's rape by an off-duty police officer, Maya found otherwise, and the Constitutional Court upheld her dissent in 2012 in F v Minister of Safety and Security. She was also noted for writing the court's unanimous judgment in AfriForum v Chairperson of the Council of the University of South Africa, a dispute about the language policy of the University of South Africa; it was the first recorded judgment of a superior court written in Xhosa. She said that it had been inspired by Justice Johan Froneman's judgments in his own home language, Afrikaans. The judgment was upheld in the Constitutional Court in Chairperson of the Council of the University of South Africa v AfriForum.

While serving in the Supreme Court of Appeal, Maya was an acting judge in the Supreme Court of Namibia in 2008 and in the Lesotho Court of Appeal in 2015, as well as in the Constitutional Court of South Africa from February to May 2012. In the latter capacity, she wrote the Constitutional Court's majority judgment in Competition Commission v Loungefoam and Others. She was also the chairperson of the South African Law Reform Commission from 2013 to 2016.

=== Nominations to the Constitutional Court ===
During her first decade in the Supreme Court of Appeal, Maya was twice nominated unsuccessfully for appointment as a puisne judge of the Constitutional Court. She was first interviewed by the Judicial Service Commission in September 2009 as one of 24 candidates for four vacancies. She was one of the seven candidates whom the Judicial Service Commission shortlisted after its hearings, and Pierre de Vos viewed her as a strong candidate with a demonstrated "sensitivity for gender issues". However, President Jacob Zuma declined to appoint her, instead confirming the appointments of Johan Froneman, Chris Jafta, Sisi Khampepe and Mogoeng Mogoeng.

In May 2012, Maya was one of four candidates – alongside Raymond Zondo, Ronnie Bosielo, and Robert Nugent – nominated for the Constitutional Court seat vacated by Chief Justice Sandile Ngcobo's retirement. Maya had recently been an acting judge in the Constitutional Court, and several prominent gender rights organisations lobbied in support of her candidacy. However, during her interview in Johannesburg in June, she "appeared nervous" and was subjected to stern questioning about judicial independence and the exercise of judicial restraint in reviewing executive action. The Judicial Service Commission shortlisted all four candidates as suitable for appointment, but President Zuma elected to appoint Zondo. When Justice Zak Yacoob's retirement was announced later in 2012, Maya declined a third nomination to stand for elevation to the Constitutional Court.

=== Deputy Presidency ===
In June 2015, Maya was President Zuma's sole nominee for appointment as Deputy President of the Supreme Court of Appeal, a position that had been vacated by Kenneth Mthiyane upon his retirement in 2014. Following an interview in Johannesburg in July, the Judicial Service Commission recommended her as suitable for appointment. Zuma confirmed her appointment on 23 September 2015, and she became the first woman to serve as the court's Deputy President. When Supreme Court President Lex Mpati retired the following year, she stood in as acting president.

=== Presidency ===
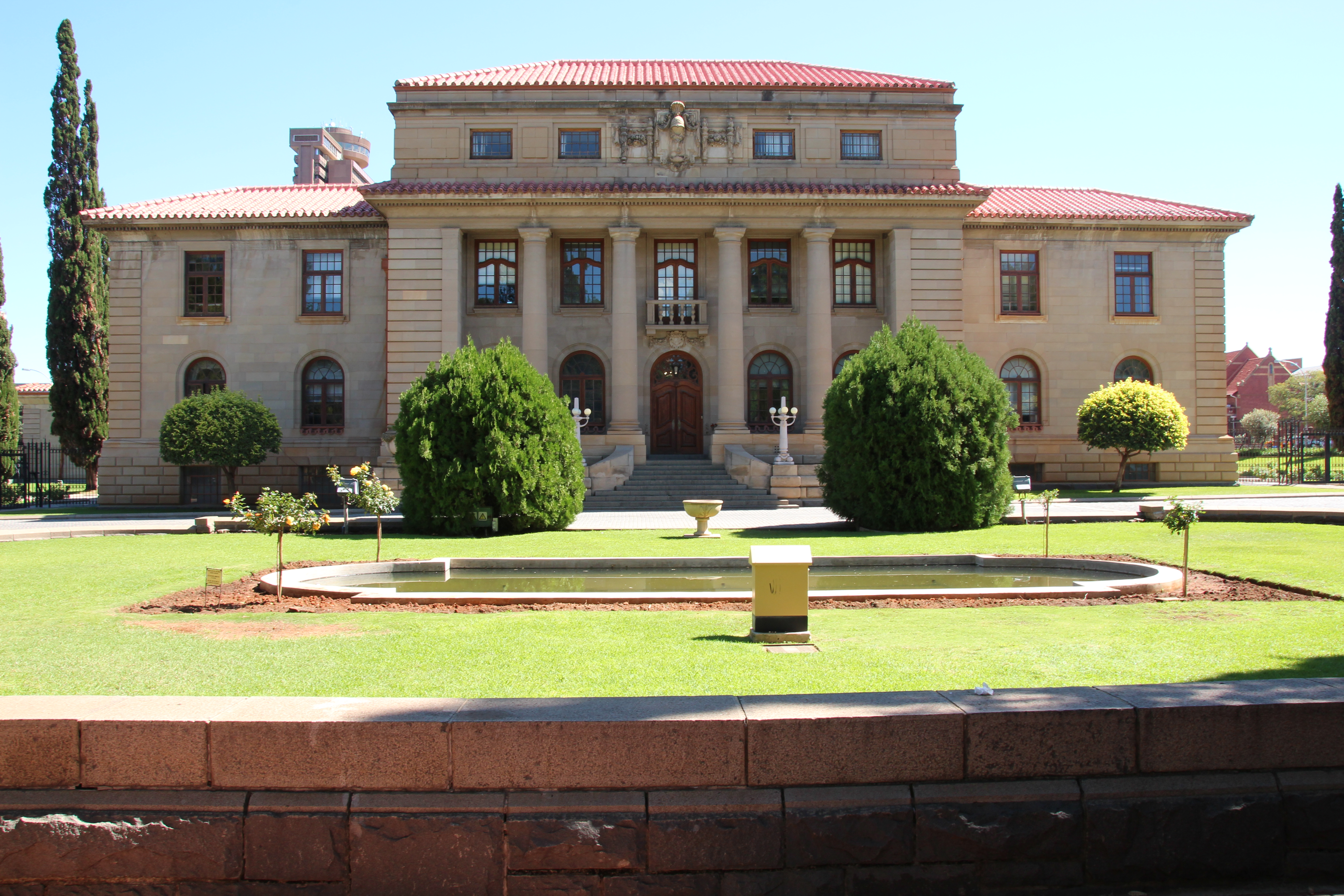
The façade of the Supreme Court of Appeal courthouse in Bloemfontein, where Maya worked for 12 years

President Zuma announced in March 2017 that Maya was his sole nominee to succeed Mpati as Supreme Court President. During and after her confirmation interview with the Judicial Service Commission in April, she was highly candid about what she described as the Supreme Court's "challenges", describing the court as "not the most collegial of courts" and its judges as afflicted with "superiority complexes and disrespect". The Judicial Service Commission endorsed her appointment, which was confirmed by Zuma with immediate effect on 26 May 2017.

During the COVID-19 pandemic, Maya oversaw the Supreme Court's transition to virtual court hearings held through Microsoft Teams, and she was generally viewed as a strong leader and capable administrator. She later told the Judicial Service Commission that she had arranged for the appellate judges to attend a diversity seminar, over "vociferous opposition", and judge of appeal Steven Majiedt said that the court had become more collegial under her leadership.

=== Nomination as Chief Justice ===
In October 2021, President Cyril Ramaphosa announced that Maya was included on a longlist of eight candidates to succeed Mogoeng Mogoeng as Chief Justice of South Africa, and the following month, he announced that he had shortlisted Maya and three others: Raymond Zondo, Mbuyiseli Madlanga, and Dunstan Mlambo. The Judicial Service Commission considered Maya's candidacy during an interview on 2 February 2022, which Maya opened with a lengthy address about the failure of judicial leadership to address sexism in the judiciary; among other things, she objected to the absence of formal policies on sexual harassment and maternity, recalling that, when she became the first serving judge to fall pregnant, the Department of Justice "simply did not know what to do with me". She was asked at length about her own gender, and she cried when commissioner Sylvia Lucas congratulated her at length for "breaking the glass ceiling".

The interview proceedings were controversial. Some commentators argued that Maya had been subjected to sexist treatment, with Rebecca Davis of the Daily Maverick pointing to commissioner Dali Mpofu's joke about having "spent a night" with Maya. Other commentators, however, believed that she had been given preferential treatment, especially by Supreme Court Deputy President Xola Petse; they argued that she faced far fewer substantive and jurisprudential questions than did the other candidates. After all four candidates were interviewed, the Judicial Service Commission announced that it would recommend Maya for appointment.

However, the commission's recommendation was not binding, and in March, President Ramaphosa announced that, contrary to the recommendation, he would appoint Zondo as Chief Justice. He said that he intended to nominate Maya to succeed Zondo as Deputy Chief Justice of South Africa.

In July 2024, Ramaphosa appointed Maya as Chief Justice, effective September 2024.

== Constitutional Court: 2022–present ==
In May 2022, Maya accepted Ramaphosa's nomination to the position of Deputy Chief Justice. After she was interviewed in June, the Judicial Service Commission endorsed the nomination, and Ramaphosa announced on 25 July that she would be appointed to the position with effect from 1 September 2022.

In February 2023, Zondo announced that Maya had been appointed to chair a new committee tasked with drafting a sexual harassment policy for the judiciary, and in June 2023, she handed down judgment on behalf of a unanimous court in Ashebo v Minister of Home Affairs and Others, which blocked the deportation of an asylum seeker.

In August 2025, Maya introduced a new sexual harassment policy for the Judiciary .

== International Association of Women Judges ==
Maya was a founding member of the South African chapter of the International Association of Women Judges (IAWJ) in 2002. She served as the chapter's deputy president from 2008 to 2010 and as its president from 2018 to 2023. She was later elected as IAWJ's regional director for West and Southern Africa in 2021, and as its vice president in 2023.

== Honours ==
Maya was awarded honorary LLDs by Nelson Mandela University in 2018, Walter Sisulu University in 2019, and the University of Fort Hare in 2020. In July 2021, she was appointed as the Chancellor of the University of Mpumalanga.

== Personal life ==
Maya is married to Dabulamanzi Mlokoti, a businessman from Johannesburg, and has three children. Her daughter, Wela Mlokoti, clerked on the Constitutional Court in Chris Jafta's chambers and rose to public prominence for lodging a disciplinary complaint against Judge Fayeeza Kathree-Setiloane, who was acting in the Constitutional Court at the time.
