= Judicial Service Commission (South Africa) =

The Judicial Service Commission is a body specially constituted by the South African Constitution to recommend persons for appointment to the judiciary of South Africa.

== History ==
In apartheid South Africa, judges were appointed by the President, usually on the direction of the Minister of Justice, and behind closed doors. During the constitutional negotiations, it was decided that the President's power should be moderated by a special body relatively insulated from partisan interests. It was to be composed of a number of politicians, from both the ruling party and the opposition, and non-politicians, and would conduct public interviews. The Judicial Service Commission (JSC) was therefore created by the Interim Constitution. The JSC is now regulated by section 178 of the final Constitution (and by the Judicial Service Commission Act 9 of 1994).

== Composition ==
In terms of section 178(1) of the Constitution, the JSC is usually composed of 25 members. This membership is divided more or less evenly between politicians and non-politicians. These are:

- the Chief Justice of South Africa, who presides over its meetings;
- the President of the Supreme Court of Appeal;
- one Judge President designated by the Judges President;
- the Minister of Justice and Constitutional Development, or his/her designated alternate;
- two practicing advocates nominated from within the advocates' profession;
- two practicing attorneys nominated from within the attorneys' profession;
- one teacher of law, designated by the teachers of law at South African universities;
- six members from the National Assembly, including three from opposition parties;
- four members from the National Council of Provinces; and
- four more persons designated by the President after consulting the leaders of all the parties in the National Assembly.

When the JSC considers the appointment of judges to a division of the High Court, its Judge President, and the Premier of the province in which it is located, must also be present. When the matter before the Commission does not concern the appointment of a judge, the members from the National Assembly and the National Council of Provinces are excluded.

== Judicial appointments ==
The JSC's primary function is to select South Africa's judges. Though the President makes the appointments, the JSC has a crucial screening function. In the case of judges of the High Court and Supreme Court of Appeal, the President's role is purely formal; they must confirm the candidates chosen by the JSC. But in the case of justices of the Constitutional Court, the country's highest, the President has a discretion: the JSC provides a shortlist of four candidates, from which the President picks one. In the appointment of the Chief Justice and Deputy Chief Justice, finally, the JSC's power is most attenuated: the President makes the appointments "after consulting" the JSC and opposition parties, whose opinions they may disregard.

=== 1994–1999: Mandela administration ===
==== The first Constitutional Court ====
The JSC's first task after its establishment was to determine the members of the newly formed Constitutional Court. The Court's President, Arthur Chaskalson, had already been appointed by President Mandela. Four other judges – Laurie Ackermann, Richard Goldstone, Tholie Madala and Ismail Mahomed – were then appointed by Mandela, in consultation with Chaskalson, from the ranks of the existing Supreme Court. The JSC's role was to compile the shortlist from which the remaining six members of the Court would be picked.

At that stage the commissioners included many of the country's most respected lawyers, like Chaskalson, Mahomed, George Bizos, Wim Trengove and Etienne Mureinik, to whom the politicians on the JSC usually deferred. And the Mandela administration appointed several opposition politicians – more than the Constitution requires – to act as commissioners. According to one commentator, "there was a seeming lack of cynicism reflective of the heady early days of democracy".

The main facade of the Constitutional Court of South Africa.

Nevertheless, interviews were robust. Most famously, Albie Sachs was questioned about his role in a report downplaying the ANC's indefinite detention and solitary confinement of Umkhonto we Sizwe commander Thami Zulu. One commissioner told Sachs his answers were "appalling" and criticised him for "sell[ing] his soul" by signing onto the report. Sachs felt the criticism was unfair given his central role in ending torture in ANC camps.

Sachs was ultimately appointed, though one prominent lawyer later said that if Sachs's interview had been more widely publicised he "could not possibly have been on the Court". Many were also disappointed that John Dugard was overlooked. Nevertheless, the bench that was ultimately appointed was widely praised, and their tenure thought to mark the Court's golden age. The unorthodox appointment of Kate O'Regan, a legal academic aged only 37, proved a masterstroke, for she became, in the view of many, one of South Africa's greatest ever judges. Pius Langa, whom Mandela appointed as Deputy President of the Court in 1998, would also later become one of South Africa's most celebrated judges. The other three JSC appointees were John Didcott, a famously liberal High Court judge; Johann Kriegler, also an outlier on the apartheid bench; and Yvonne Mokgoro, a legal academic.

In February 1998, Zak Yacoob was appointed to the Constitutional Court to replace the late Ismail Mahomed. Yacoob, blind since infancy, had been a prominent anti-apartheid lawyer, member of the Natal Indian Congress and ANC, and advisor to the drafters of the South African Constitution.

==== SARFU case ====
Many judges of the Court had, like Yacoob, been ANC members, or had at least worked with the ANC in the struggle against apartheid. This became contentious in May 1999, when the South African Rugby Football Union's legal challenge to President Mandela's power to appoint a commission of inquiry into the sport reached the Constitutional Court on appeal. SARFU's acrimonious, racially charged challenge was led by its head, the "arrogant" and "boorish" Louis Luyt, who had locked horns with the ANC in the past. SARFU sought the recusal of Chaskalson, Langa, Sachs and Yacoob on the basis that they "had extremely close ties" with Mandela's ANC and might therefore be biased. The likely effect of the recusal would have been that the "astonishing" decision of High Court judge Willem de Villers – who had subpoenaed Mandela and "all but called him a liar", and ultimately found in SARFU's favour – would stand. But the Constitutional Court unanimously dismissed the recusal application, prompting Luyt to withdraw from the appeal in protest, saying he had lost confidence in the judiciary. The Court later found against SARFU on the merits.

Controversial right-wing commentator R.W. Johnson later used the saga to argue that the Court was illegitimate and aligned with the ANC government. To most observers, however, Luyt was the villain of the piece (and Johnson's book full of "unsubstantiated gossip"). He was soon ousted as head of SARFU, whose new leaders apologised to Mandela for taking him to court. The Court's judgment on the recusal application is still widely cited by South African and foreign courts.

==== Ngcobo appointment ====
The first major controversy about political interference in judicial appointments occurred with Sandile Ngcobo's appointment to the Constitutional Court in 1999 to replace the late John Didcott. The JSC had recommended the appointment of Edwin Cameron, considered "the greatest legal mind of his generation", but Ngcobo was ultimately preferred due to the late intercession of Thabo Mbeki, then Deputy President, who felt the appointee should be black. The Guardian reported that South Africa's legal fraternity "launched a vigorous attack" on Mbeki when news of his intervention broke. One advocate lamented that, "in this instance, the importance of race trumped the importance of cutting edge jurisprudence". Cameron said, however, there is "no doubt" the decision to appoint Ngcobo was correct.

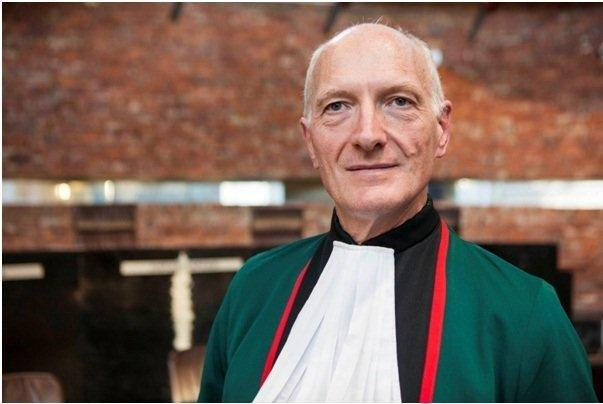
Edwin Cameron, who was appointed to the High Court in 1994, and whose promotion to the Constitutional Court was controversially blocked by Thabo Mbeki in 1999 but effected ten years later by Kgalema Motlanthe.

=== 1999–2008: Mbeki administration ===
Shortly after this incident, Mbeki became the country's President. His administration preserved the high number of commissioners from the opposition, but is thought to have prioritised ANC policy, and candidates' race, in the making of judicial appointments.

This has proved controversial. Some commentators say the strongest candidates for appointment and promotion were regularly overlooked. For example, the "obscure" Bess Nkabinde was appointed to the Constitutional Court in 2008 ahead of "the obvious candidate", esteemed legal academic Cora Hoexter.

By the end of Mbeki's tenure, the JSC faced a dearth of candidates for judicial appointment, apparently because few were willing to subject themselves to its flawed selection process.

=== 2008–2009: Motlanthe administration ===
In December 2007, at the Polokwane conference, Mbeki was ousted as ANC President by Jacob Zuma. The following year, KwaZulu-Natal High Court judge Chris Nicholson ruled that Mbeki had sought Zuma's prosecution for corruption for political reasons. This judgement was, however, later overturned by the Appeal Court. The ANC recalled Mbeki, who officially resigned as President on 24 September 2008. Kgalema Motlanthe became the country's "caretaker president" pending the 2009 general elections, in which Zuma was elected.

Motlanthe's most significant act in relation to the judiciary was to appoint Edwin Cameron (whose appointment in 1999 Mbeki had prevented) to the Constitutional Court with effect from 1 January 2009. This appointment was widely praised, both for Cameron's legal ability and because he is openly gay and HIV-positive. Some suggested that Cameron would not have been appointed by either Mbeki, of whose AIDS denialism Cameron had been a fierce critic, or Zuma, likely to be discomfited by white, gay, liberal-minded judges. Cameron was also appointed despite a lengthy submission to the JSC by advocate Vuyani Ngalwana arguing that a white man should not be appointed.

=== 2009–: Zuma administration ===
On 9 May 2009, Zuma became President of South Africa, and significant changes to the JSC's composition soon followed. ANC "heavyweights" Jeff Radebe and Ngoako Ramatlhodi, both controversial figures and key Zuma allies, joined the Commission as the new Minister of Justice and a senior ANC MP respectively. Fatima Chohan, then an ANC parliamentarian, also joined. The new administration abandoned Mandela and Mbeki's convention of appointing supernumerary opposition members of the NCOP, and packed the Commission with four ANC representatives. Finally, Zuma's four presidential appointees, who replaced founding commissioner George Bizos among others, were Dumisa Ntsebeza SC, Ishmael Semenya SC, Vas Soni SC and Andiswa Ndoni. Legal academic Pierre de Vos described Ntsebeza and Ndoni as "racial nationalists", noted controversies hanging over Semenya and Soni, and said the appointments were "bad news". Radebe, Ramatlhodi, Chohan, Ntsebeza and Semenya soon became vocal and influential commissioners, whose conduct soon led to fears of a "partisan takeover" of the JSC.

==== 2009 Constitutional Court appointments ====
In October 2009, soon after becoming President, it fell to Zuma to appoint four judges to the Constitutional Court to replace the retiring Pius Langa, Yvonne Mokgoro, Kate O'Regan and Albie Sachs, the last remaining members of the Court appointed upon its creation in 1994. All four were "stalwarts" of the Court, "among its most industrious, as well as progressive, members" – and regarded with "intense suspicion" by some Zuma supporters. Some suspected Zuma would use his powers of appointment to "rein in the courts", appointing more pliant judges in their stead.

Over twenty candidates were interviewed, yet the JSC announced its seven-person shortlist just twenty minutes after interviews ended. One Commissioner later said it was clear the ANC had pre-determined the shortlist. Nevertheless, most commentators were pleased with the seven nominees. Zuma ultimately appointed Johan Froneman, Chris Jafta, Sisi Khampepe and Mogoeng Mogoeng. The four appointments were received relatively positively. Mogoeng's appointment was by far the most controversial, primarily because of his lack of experience. Some said his interview had been an "eccentric" and "bizarre performance" in which he admitted he had little knowledge of constitutional law; other, however, said his humble "lay preacher" performance was "very charismatic".

==== Ngcobo's appointment as Chief Justice ====
Zuma appointed Sandile Ngcobo as Chief Justice, replacing Pius Langa. Reactions were mixed. While virtually all commentators noted that Ngcobo was a highly respected jurist with an "outstanding" track record, many felt the natural successor to Langa was Deputy Chief Justice Dikgang Moseneke – and that Moseneke had been passed over because of his public comments distancing himself from the ANC. Worse, some suspected Ngcobo had courted the appointment by finding in Zuma's favour in the contentious Thint case the previous year. Ngcobo had been a lone dissentient; every other judge on the Court found against Zuma. Finally, some thought that Ngcobo, whose term would end just two years later, was merely a "caretaker" Chief Justice pending the accession of John Hlophe, a deeply polarising figure.

As it turned out, the issue of Ngcobo's succession was even more controversial than anticipated, though for different reasons. According to section 176(1) of the South African Constitution, "a Constitutional Court judge holds office for a non-renewable term of 12 years ... except where an Act of Parliament extends the term of office of a Constitutional Court judge". Ngcobo's 12-year term was due to expire on 15 August 2011. But, on 3 June, Zuma announced that he was extending Ngcobo's tenure for a further five years, using the power contained in section 8(a) of the Judges Remuneration and Conditions of Employment Act of 2001. The section had been criticised by legal academics upon its enactment in 2011 and had never before been used. Within two weeks of Zuma's announcement, several rights groups launched a legal challenge, arguing that the section was unconstitutional. The Constitutional Court convened an extraordinary session to hear the case, and gave judgment upholding the challenge on 29 July 2011. The Court held that "it is only by an Act of Parliament that an extension may occur"; section 8(a), which purported to delegate the power to extend to the President, was therefore unconstitutional, and the extension of Ngcobo's tenure invalid. Ngcobo had in any event withdrawn his acceptance of the extension two days before judgment was given.

==== Mogoeng's appointment as Chief Justice ====
The Ngcobo "cock-up" left Zuma in disrepute and in urgent need of a new Chief Justice. The Daily Maverick, noting that Zuma had "in virtually every case" in the past tried to "weaken the independent institutions set up in the Constitution", predicted that Zuma might look to the "malleable", "socially conservative" and "executive-minded" Mogoeng Mogoeng to fill the position. Criticism of the JSC reached a crescendo when Mogoeng was indeed nominated for the Chief Justiceship in August 2011.

Zuma's decision to appoint Mogoeng, despite his many critics, coupled with the partisan conduct of the JSC's political appointees during his interview, suggested to several commentators that the judicial appointment process had been captured by political interests. One commentator said the JSC had not seemed to apply its mind to Mogoeng's nomination at all.

Some, including the opposition Democratic Alliance, have since suggested that the number of politicians on the JSC should be reduced.

==== Attacks on the judiciary ====
On 1 September 2011, in the midst of the controversy about Mogoeng's nomination, Ngoako Ramatlhodi wrote an op-ed in The Times which described the Constitution as "a grand and total strategy to entrench [white economic interests] for all times" by moving power out of government and into the judiciary – appointments to which had "frustrate[d]" racial transformation and been influenced by "white-dominated law societies". He criticised the "bashing" of the JSC and those who sought the judicial review of its decisions. Ramatlhodi's position, which he reiterated the following year, was widely condemned by Pierre de Vos, Vusi Pikoli and the media. The Mail & Guardian described Ramatlhodi as "the spearhead of the ANC's growing campaign to clip the wings" of the judiciary when, in February 2012, he proposed at an ANC national executive committee meeting that the Constitutional Court's powers should be "reviewed". Ramatlhodi's comments came in the wake of similar criticism of the judiciary by President Zuma, Gwede Mantashe and Blade Nzimande, and were supported by Jeff Radebe. In June 2012, Ramatlhodi once again criticised the judiciary, saying it had become a "new tyranny". The planned review of the Constitutional Court's decisions went ahead in August 2013, despite strong criticism from George Bizos, Mamphela Ramphele and others. The following year, commentators noted that some commissioners, like Ramatlhodi and Fatima Chohan, had become "fixated" on the separation of powers – a "euphemism" for their preference for judges "who will more likely defer to the executive". Chohan even said at a JSC session that she found it "disturbing" when people with "human rights activist tendencies" wanted to become judges.

The Zuma administration's attacks on the legitimacy of the judiciary have since intensified, especially in the wake of the 2015 al-Bashir scandal. After the departure from the JSC of Radebe, Ramatlhodi and Chohan in 2014, however, the attacks have generally not emanated from Commissioners – with the limited exception of Mathole Motshekga, who had, in 2013, before becoming a Commissioner, criticised a Constitutional Court judgment that upheld an opposition MP's challenge to the Rules of Parliament.

==== Transformation row ====
The JSC's attitude to the racial transformation of the judiciary has also proved highly controversial. In April 2013, Izak Smuts, a senior commissioner, circulated a discussion document in which he criticised the JSC's overemphasis on race, and neglect of merit, which tacitly barred white males from appointment and turned JSC interviews into a "charade". Other prominent commissioners, like Mogoeng and Ntsebeza, defended the JSC's approach, saying it was only applying the criteria formulated at the JSC's inception and that white males could still be appointed.

But when the JSC convened the following week, it was criticised for its "brutal" treatment of High Court judge Clive Plasket when he was interviewed for promotion to the Supreme Court of Appeal. Bellicose JSC members seemed to have selectively attacked Plasket – "improperly castigating" him, using him as a punch-bag "to release some pent-up frustration", and depicting him as opposed to the appointment of black judges despite his well-known anti-apartheid activism. He was ultimately not appointed, in favour of two candidates whom many South African lawyers regarded as obviously inferior. Smuts resigned in protest two days later, citing the JSC's "disturbing" appointment record which "has left a trail of wasted forensic talent in its wake". He cited the examples of Plasket, Geoff Budlender, Azhar Cachalia, Jeremy Gauntlett and Willem van der Linde.

In response, senior members of the JSC said that racial transformation was indeed "highest on the agenda", and that, since Smuts did not seem to agree, he "was correct" to resign. And Chief Justice Mogoeng gave a now "infamous" speech at an Advocates for Transformation event in which he said a "deliberate attempt is being made to delegitimize the JSC" through "scare tactics" and blamed this on "a well coordinated network of individuals and entities" – possibly apartheid agents, Mogoeng implied – "pretending to be working in isolation from each other". Mogoeng called on his audience to oppose "this illegitimate neo-political campaign to have certain people appointed". This speech was criticised for departing from the requirements of judicial impartiality and seeming to betray a racial bias. Paul Hoffman SC sought to have Mogoeng impeached on the basis that he had brought the judiciary into disrepute, but this complaint was itself widely criticised as "ill-considered" and "weak on the law" and was dismissed by the Judicial Conduct Committee.

For others, the problem was not that transformation was being over-emphasised, but that it was concealing the real reasons for the JSC's decisions. Two legal academics from the University of Cape Town wrote, for example, that the proposition that white males' merit was being ignored was "simply not borne out" by the facts, since 22 white males had been recommended for appointment between 2010 and 2012. The question was not, they said, "why is the JSC not appointing white men?", but "what is it about those white men who are not recommended that renders them unsuitable, in the JSC’s view, for appointment, by contrast with those who are recommended?". Some felt transformation was being used as a smokescreen behind which to appoint executive-minded judges – instead of ones with a strong and independent record, like Plasket. If transformation were the real issue, some suggested, then it was irrational that the judges who pipped Plasket were not questioned about transformation at all.

Several leading commentators, including retired Constitutional Court judge Zak Yacoob and Wits law professor Cathi Albertyn, said that the JSC's appointment criteria needed to be made clearer and more consistent. Some noted the stark and seemingly "unfair" difference in the treatment of certain interviewees. "We need to have clear, defined criteria and we need to be confident that politicians [who serve on the JSC] are acting in terms of [those] criteria", Albertyn said. Similarly, the National Development Plan 2030, drafted in late 2012 by senior ANC politicians Trevor Manuel and Cyril Ramaphosa, states as one of its goals: "Clear criteria for the appointment of judges must be put in place."

Many writers also criticised Smuts and the JSC for setting up a false opposition between transformation and merit. This was said to "border on racism" given the distinguished black candidates available. In addition, these writers said, transformation requires the appointment of judges with progressive values – not (only) of judges who are black – and is consequently an important component of merit. The National Development Plan endorses these sentiments too, since it adds that the revamped criteria for judicial appointments must "emphasis[e] the candidates' progressive credentials and transformative judicial philosophy and expertise".

The upshot of the JSC's approach is that it has repeatedly struggled to fill vacancies because insufficient candidates have applied; in the view of many, this is because few are willing to subject themselves to the unfair selection process.

==== Legal challenges ====
Shortly after Smuts's resignation, the Helen Suzman Foundation took the JSC to court over its allegedly "irrational" refusal to appoint certain candidates. An earlier decision of the JSC taken in April 2011 had already been declared unlawful on this basis by the Supreme Court of Appeal. In September 2014, the Helen Suzman Foundation's interlocutory application to have the record of the JSC's deliberations made public was dismissed by the Western Cape High Court.

==== 2014 recomposition ====
After the 2014 general elections, in which Zuma was re-elected, there were significant changes to the composition of the JSC. ANC hardliner Jeff Radebe was replaced by the more "balance[d]" Michael Masutha as Minister of Justice and Correctional Services. Nine of the ten parliamentary members of the JSC also departed, including Zuma loyalists Ngoako Ramatlhodi and Fatima Chohan, both strident opponents of "judicial activism". The most prominent incoming ANC members were Mathole Motshekga, Thoko Didiza and Thandi Modise. Commentators were broadly optimistic about these changes – albeit that "it was tempting to think" that former ANC Chief Whip Motshekga, who had criticised a 2013 Constitutional Court judgment upholding an opposition MP's challenge to the Rules of Parliament, "may be the kingpin of a political caucus" within the JSC. The Zuma administration retained its practice of appointing only ANC members from the NCOP, drawing criticism from the Democratic Alliance.

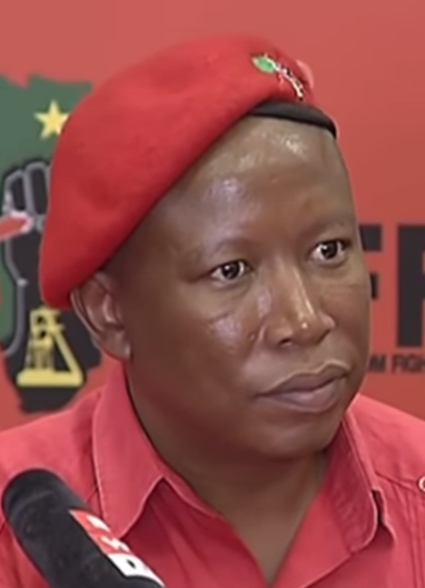
Julius Malema, whose appointment to the JSC in 2014 was described as "shocking", "jaw-dropping" and "outrageous".

By far the most eye-catching newcomer was noted firebrand Julius Malema, the "Commander in Chief" of the Economic Freedom Fighters, whose appointment to the JSC was described by journalists as "shocking" and "jaw-dropping". Corné Mulder of the Freedom Front Plus, said the appointment was "outrageous". Legal analysts questioned whether it was appropriate for Malema, who was facing criminal charges, to be involved in the appointment of judges, but felt that his outspokenness could nevertheless be an asset – provided he avoided political grandstanding. It was noted, finally, that Malema had "crossed swords dramatically" with fellow newcomer Modise, who had had him thrown out of a parliamentary session.

Soon after the reshuffle, several commentators perceived a marked improvement in the conduct of the JSC's interviews, especially on questions about gender transformation in the judiciary. This was ascribed in part to Chief Justice Mogoeng's leadership and to the departure of ANC hardliners like Radebe, Ramatlhodi and Chohan. City Press even suggested the JSC was entering a "golden age".

==== Skweyiya vacancy ====
After the retirement of Justice Thembile Skweyiya in May 2014, Mogoeng stated that he wanted to appoint a female judge in his place. The vacancy was then left open for over a year, as a series of female acting appointments were made instead, apparently to provide a test run. While Mogoeng's recognition of the pressing need for a female appointment was widely celebrated, the suggestion that he needed over a year to find one was said to be "patronising" and unconvincing. Worse, the dilatoriness in making a permanent appointment was criticised by commentators, who said it was corrosive of judicial independence and inconsistent with the South African Constitution. Mogoeng was also criticised for implying that no male applicants would be considered, thus compounding perceptions that the JSC's appointees were "preordained".

The JSC finally acted to fill the Skweyiya vacancy fourteen months after it arose. Four female candidates – Nonkosi Mhlantla, Leona Theron, Zukisa Tshiqi and Dhaya Pillay – applied, and all were interviewed and shortlisted on 9 July 2015. Mhlantla was finally appointed with effect from 1 December 2015, a decision which received lukewarm praise. The interviews had seen a reemergence of tensions between the executive and the judiciary, probably as a result of the saga over the government's failure to arrest Omar al-Bashir, which was reflected in the JSC's questions.

=== 2022 Chief Justice appointment ===
The JSC interview process for recommending the Chief Justice in 2022 was mired in controversy.

== Judicial misconduct ==
The JSC also decides complaints of misconduct against judicial officers. This has been the subject of extreme controversy, primarily because of the complaints against John Hlophe.

== Other functions ==
The JSC is also responsible for judicial education. Its first training seminar, held in July 1997, was organised by Ian Farlam and Fritz Brand with money donated by the Canadian government.
