= Patricia Goliath =

South African judge

The Honourable Patricia Goliath

Deputy Judge President of the Western Cape High Court
- Incumbent
- Assumed office 1 July 2016
- President: Jacob Zuma
- Judge President: John Hlophe
- Preceded by: Jeanette Traverso

Judge of the High Court
- Incumbent
- Assumed office 1 January 2006
- President: Thabo Mbeki
- Division: Western Cape

Personal details
- Born: 15 October 1964 (age 61) Cape Town, South Africa
- Education: Athlone High School
- Alma mater: University of the Western Cape; University of Cape Town

Patricia Lynette Goliath (born 15 October 1964) is a South African judge of the High Court of South Africa. She has been the acting Judge President of the Western Cape Division since December 2022, when John Hlophe was suspended and then impeached.

Goliath was born in Cape Town and entered legal practice as an attorney in 1990. President Thabo Mbeki appointed her to the Western Cape bench in January 2006, and she was appointed as the division's Deputy Judge President in July 2016. She was an acting judge in the Constitutional Court of South Africa in 2018, and in 2019 she was shortlisted for permanent elevation to the apex court.

== Early life and career ==
Goliath was born in Cape Town on 15 October 1964. After matriculating at Athlone High School in 1982, she attended the University of the Western Cape, where she graduated with a BA and LLB. She later completed an LLM and certificate in labour law at the University of Cape Town, as well as a diploma in insolvency law at the University of Pretoria.

Admitted as an attorney of the Supreme Court in 1990, she practised on her own account until she joined the bench. She was a member of the Black Lawyers' Association. She also published on human rights issues including prisoners of war, gun control, and juvenile sentencing and life imprisonment.

== Cape High Court: 2006–present ==
On 1 January 2006, Goliath joined the bench of the High Court of South Africa as a judge of the Western Cape Division. Shortly after her arrival, she was featured in Courting Justice, a 2008 documentary film about South African women judges.

=== Notable cases ===
In matters of public prominence, Goliath presided in the Anene Booysen murder trial, the 2017 murder trial of artist Zwelethu Mthethwa, and the 2022 civic campaign to halt the development of new Amazon headquarters at the River Club in Observatory, Cape Town. Among her most legally significant early decisions was Giles v Henriques, a decision in the law of succession which the Supreme Court of Appeal largely upheld in 2009 in Henriques v Giles. Her 2015 decision in Steyn v Hasse was an important judgment on the law of universal partnerships, and her 2016 decision in Tlouamma v Speaker of the National Assembly was relied on by parties in the Constitutional Court matter of UDM v Speaker of the National Assembly.

In 2020, Goliath heard Mineral Sands Resources v Reddell; Mineral Commodities v Dlamini; Mineral Commodities v Clarke, a high-profile defamation suit brought by mining companies against activists opposed to the development of the Xolobeni titanium mine and Tormin sand mine. She dismissed the suit in February 2021, upholding the activists' defence that strategic litigation against public participation (SLAPP) constitutes unlawful abuse of process; it was the first time that such a defence had been tested in South African law. The Constitutional Court largely upheld Goliath's judgment in Mineral Sands Resources v Reddell, though it disagreed with Goliath about the burden that SLAPP defences must meet. In Reddell v Mineral Sands Resources, a separate appeal in the same matter, the Constitutional Court also upheld Goliath's finding that trading corporations may claim general damages for defamation, although with the additional caveat that such claims may not succeed against speech in the public interest.

=== Deputy judge presidency ===
In April 2016, Goliath was one of three shortlisted candidates whom the Judicial Service Commission (JSC) interviewed for possible appointment as Deputy Judge President of the Western Cape Division. In June, President Jacob Zuma announced that, on the advice of the JSC, he had appointed Goliath to take office as Deputy Judge President with effect from 1 July 2016. She succeeded Jeanette Traverso in the position.

As Deputy Judge President, Goliath served under long-serving Judge President John Hlophe, who was a controversial figure and who battled a gross misconduct investigation continuously between 2008 and 2024. Goliath and Hlophe had a fraught relationship. When President Cyril Ramaphosa suspended Hlophe from office on 14 December 2022, Goliath took over his office in an acting capacity. She continued to act in the office after Hlophe was impeached in early 2024.

=== Constitutional Court ===
Goliath was seconded to the Constitutional Court as an acting justice for a full year in 2018. During that time, she wrote for the court's majority in Rahube v Rahube, on discriminatory provisions of the Upgrading of Land Tenure Rights Act, and in South African Veterinary Association v Speaker of the National Assembly, on Parliament's duty to consult. She also wrote one of two leading judgments in Jacobs v S, which was a notable matter because the court deadlocked.

In February 2019, the JSC announced that she was among six candidates who had been shortlisted for possible appointment to two permanent vacancies at the Constitutional Court. When she was interviewed in April, members of the panel asked her about a submission from the General Council of the Bar, which had suggested that Goliath needed more judicial experience outside of her considerable criminal law experience. She was also asked about the Constitutional Court's treatment of her Tlouamma judgment in UDM v Speaker, about the court's deadlock in Jacobs v S, and about her understanding of the separation of powers principle. In the latter regard, Goliath said that the judiciary is "the ultimate guardian of our Constitution" and "has an oversight function over the other two arms of state".

Following the interviews, the JSC recommended Goliath and four others – Steven Majiedt, Zukisa Tshiqi, Jody Kollapen, and Annali Basson – as suitable for appointment. However, in September 2019, President Ramaphosa announced that he had elected to appoint Majiedt and Tshiqi, who widely been viewed as the frontrunners.

== Dispute with John Hlophe ==
=== Misconduct complaints ===
On 15 January 2020, Goliath approached the JSC with a formal complaint against Judge President Hlophe, accusing Hlophe of, inter alia, physical assault, intimidation, and nepotism in favour of his wife, Western Cape Judge Gayaat Salie-Hlophe, who was also named in the complaint. Salie-Hlophe responded with fierce recriminations, leading Goliath to threaten her with a defamation lawsuit. Meanwhile, Hlophe laid a counter-complaint against Goliath at the JSC in February 2020, accusing her of gross misconduct. During ensuing inquiries, Goliath entered as evidence an audio recording of an acrimonious exchange with Hlophe in 2019, made without Hlophe's knowledge.

In July 2020, Chief Justice Mogoeng Mogoeng, in his capacity as head of the JSC, dismissed Hlophe's counter-complaint against Goliath. In subsequent months, Hlophe and his attorneys accused Mogoeng and Goliath of illicit collusion, claiming that the pair had met secretly in 2019 to discuss whether Goliath should make a complaint against Hlophe. Hlophe's lawyer also proposed that Mogoeng, an ardent Christian, was biased towards Goliath on personal grounds, suggesting that "he may well have nurtured a deeply spiritual relationship with Deputy Judge President Goliath with whom it is rumoured, he engaged in fervent prayers while she served at the Constitutional Court as an acting judge". Mogoeng and Goliath confirmed that they had met to discuss Hlophe in October 2019, though Mogoeng disputed that he had been aware of Goliath's complaint before it was made formally.

In March 2021, a Judicial Conduct Committee tribunal led by appellate judge Nambitha Dambuza recommended that the JSC should open an inquiry into the Hlophe couple's allegations of misconduct by Goliath. However, in November 2023, the JSC cleared Goliath on the counter-complaint and recommended that Hlophe should be subject to impeachment proceedings in connection with the allegations in Goliath's original complaint. Hlophe was, in any case, impeached on separate charges in early 2024.

=== Alleged assassination plot ===
On 3 June 2020, members of the Grahamstown Bar contacted Goliath to alert her that they had received a tip from a prisoner that another judge had hired hitmen to assassinate Goliath. The tip was subsequently investigated by the Judicial Inspectorate for Correctional Services (JICS), which reported to the Minister of Justice and Office of the Chief Justice that the threat was credible enough to warrant further investigation. According to JICS, the whistleblower was awaiting trial in Pietermaritzburg and in May 2020 was sharing a cell with another man, Sibonelo Myeza, when Myeza received a cellphone call about the alleged hit. At the time, Myeza was himself awaiting trial in connection with the assassination of African National Congress politician Sindiso Magaqa. The whistleblower claimed to have learned that Myeza's associates had been contracted as hitmen through a third party (a senior Hawks officer), that they had met with Hlophe, and that Hlophe had given them R200,000. The hit was arranged at an amount of R3 million but was later called off.

After GroundUp broke the story of the JICS report in early September 2020, the Ministry of Justice said that it had referred the report to the South African Police Service and State Security Agency. Hlophe strongly denied the allegations, which his lawyer called "a corrupt attack on him and ultimately on judicial independence", and called for a judicial commission of inquiry into the origin of the allegations. Hlophe also suggested that Chief Justice Mogoeng had made biased rulings against him in the ongoing dispute at the JSC because he had been "influenced by" his knowledge of the assassination plot allegations, as evinced by Mogoeng's "decision to beef up her [Goliath's] security" in the aftermath of the whistleblower's tip in June. Mogoeng confirmed that his office's head of security had been involved in responding to the threat, in line with protocol, but denied any personal involvement.

== Personal life ==
She is married to Roderick Goliath since 30 January 1993, with whom she has 2 children. On 16 March 2022, a security guard was injured by gunfire when two gunmen approached Goliath's home in Cape Town.
