= Impeachment of John Hlophe =

2024 impeachment of a High Court of South Africa judge

On 21 February 2024, the National Assembly of South Africa voted to impeach Judge John Hlophe, a judge of the High Court of South Africa and the judge president of the Western Cape Division. Hlophe was accused of improper interference in the deliberations of the Constitutional Court in litigation involving the interests of Jacob Zuma. His impeachment was the result of a finding by the Judicial Service Commission that his conduct in this regard amounted to gross misconduct. Hlophe was the first judge to be impeached under the post-apartheid Constitution.

== Background and allegations ==
In 2008, the Constitutional Court of South Africa decided Thint v NDPP; Zuma v NDPP, which concerned the lawfulness of search and seizure warrants. The case was politically sensitive because the warrants in question were issued during an investigation by the Scorpions' into alleged corruption by Jacob Zuma, a prominent politician who was the former Deputy President of South Africa and the present leader of the African National Congress (ANC). On 31 July 2008, the court handed down judgment in Thint, finding against Zuma. (Note: Thint (Pty) Ltd v National Director of Public Prosecutions and Others, Zuma and Another v National Director of Public Prosecutions and Others (CCT 89/07, CCT 91/07) [2008] ZACC 13; 2008 (2) SACR 421 (CC); 2009 (1) SA 1 (CC); 2008 (12) BCLR 1197 (CC) (31 July 2008).)

Before that, however, in late June 2008, the Constitutional Court bench announced that they had jointly submitted a formal complaint to the Judicial Service Commission (JSC) against John Hlophe, a prominent judge who had been the Judge President of the High Court's Cape Provincial Division since 2000. Two members of the bench, Justice Bess Nkabinde and Acting Justice Chris Jafta, alleged that Hlophe had met with them personally and attempted to persuade them to rule in Zuma's favour in Thint. Hlophe denied this account.

== Judicial Service Commission proceedings ==
=== Initial responses: June 2008 ===
The Cape Bar Council on 2 June 2008 indicated that it had requested the JSC to "... facilitate Judge Hlophe's absence from office pending the final determination of the complaint ...", stating that it was "... untenable for Judge Hlophe to continue in office pending the determination of the complaint ...".

The Law Society of South Africa, the umbrella body for attorneys throughout the country, was reported to have expressed its "... grave concern ..." and to have stated that it had "... no doubt that the Constitutional Court judges considered the matter carefully before lodging the complaint".

Attorney Peter Horn, the President of the Law Society of the Cape of Good Hope, representative body of attorneys in the Western and Eastern Cape, urged Judge Hlophe to take a leave of absence and that there needed to be a "... sense of great urgency ...", and that the JSC should make a special effort to get its members together before the end of the week. Noting that the Society did not prejudge the issue, he stated further on the Society's behalf that "... if the allegations are found to be correct, then clearly the judge president cannot continue to serve on the bench".

The JSC met on Friday 6 June 2008, but adjourned as a result of the Constitutional Court's not having answered interrogatories by the meeting.

Hlophe was reported on 6 June 2008 to have taken leave of absence, and to have been replaced temporarily by his deputy, Jeanette Traverso.

On 10 June 2008 Judge Hlophe lodged a complaint with the JSC against the judges of the Constitutional Court for violating his rights by publicising the complaint against him and by "prejudging" the issue. He was also defended in an open letter from Paul Ngobeni to the judges of the Constitutional Court.

The Constitutional Court delivered its full exposition of its complaint to the JSC on 17 June 2008. In it they reported that he had approached Judges Jafta and Nkabinde. He had told Nkabinde that he had a "mandate" to approach her and that the four cases referred to above were important for the future of Jacob Zuma. He told her that there was "no real case against Mr Zuma and that it was now important to hold in his favour". Upon being asked what business it was of his to discuss the matter with her, Hlophe is reported to have replied that "... Mr Zuma was being "persecuted" as he [Hlophe] had been persecuted". Judge Jafta confirmed that a similar approach had been made to him, while refusing to divulge certain parts of the conversation, which he said were confidential and which he would keep so as a result of his long acquaintance, and friendship, with Hlophe. He stated that Hlophe had told him that he was "... our last hope ...". Both judges stated that they had dealt with the matter firmly and rejected Judge Hlophe's advances.

The Court also explained that Judge Hlophe misunderstood their role. As complainants they could not prejudge the matter as the JSC would adjudge it, not them.

=== Counter-complaint and lawsuit: 2008–2009 ===
In June 2008, as the JSC considered whether to proceed with the complaint against Hlophe, Hlophe lodged a counter-complaint at the JSC against the judges of the Constitutional Court. The following month, he approached the Gauteng High Court with a similar complaint, alleging that the Constitutional Court judges had violated his constitutional rights to due process, dignity, and privacy by making a statement about their allegations before he had been given a proper hearing. On these and other grounds, he asked the court to interdict the JSC's inquiry. Dumisa Ntsebeza represented Hlophe in the High Court hearings, which were held in July.

On 26 September 2008, the Johannesburg High Court handed down judgment in Hlophe v Constitutional Court, partly upholding Hlophe's application. (Note: Hlophe v Constitutional Court of South Africa and Others (08/22932) [2008] ZAGPHC 289 (25 September 2008).) The High Court ruled that the Constitutional Court judges' public statements had indeed violated Hlophe's rights. However, Deputy Judge President Phineas Mojapelo, who wrote the judgment, declined to interdict the JSC proceedings, finding that – public statements aside – the judges' complaint at the JSC was nonetheless lawful.

The High Court's ruling was appealed in the Supreme Court of Appeal in March 2009; proceedings in that court included an abortive attempt by Hlophe to apply for the recusal of Supreme Court Deputy President Louis Harms. On 31 March, the appellate court ruled unanimously in the Constitutional Court judges' favour in Langa v Hlophe. (Note: Langa and Others v Hlophe (697/08) [2009] ZASCA 36; [2009] 3 All SA 417 (SCA); 2009 (8) BCLR 823 (SCA) (31 March 2009).) Finding that neither the public statements nor the JSC complaint had been lawful, the Supreme Court overturned the High Court's ruling.

=== Abortive hearing: April 2009 ===
While the High Court and Supreme Court were considering Hlophe's complaint against the Constitutional Court judges, the JSC was preparing to hold hearings into both the Constitutional Court judges' complaint against Hlophe and his counter-complaint against them. Indeed, in parallel to the Hlophe application, several media houses, led by eTV, had approached the Gauteng High Court for an order mandating that the JSC's hearings should be open to the public; Judge Nigel Willis granted such an order in eTV v Judicial Service Commission on 31 March 2009, the same day that the Supreme Court of Appeal ruled against Hlophe in his rights claim. (Note: eTV (Pty) Ltd and Others v Judicial Service Commission and Others (13712/09,13647/09) [2009] ZAGPJHC 12; 2010 (1) SA 537 (GSJ) (31 March 2009).)

In the first week of April 2009, the JSC's hearings were delayed against by postponements requested by Hlophe. A further request for postponement was denied and the hearings commenced on 7 April in Hlophe's absence; Chief Justice Pius Langa was the first witness called to provide evidence. However, Hlophe returned to the Gauteng High Court to challenge the validity of the proceedings on several grounds, including on the grounds that it had been wrong and unfair for the JSC to deny his application for a further postponement. The High Court ruled in Hlophe's favour on 1 June in Hlophe v JSC, setting aside the April proceedings and ordering that the hearings should commence de novo. (Note: Hlophe v Judicial Service Commission and Others (19006/09) [2009] ZAGPJHC 19; [2009] 4 All SA 67 (GSJ) (1 June 2009).)

=== Preliminary investigation: July 2009 ===
In July 2009, the JSC announced that it would not immediately re-launch a full hearing into the dispute; instead, it appointed a three-member subcommittee to investigate the presence of prima facie evidence and make a recommendation on whether the JSC should pursue the matter. The subcommittee was chaired by Judge President Bernard Ngoepe and also included Marumo Moerane and Ishmael Semenya. Its proceedings were not initially open to the public, but on 29 July, Judge Frans Malan of the Gauteng High Court ruled in Mail and Guardian Limited v JSC – again in response to an application by media houses – that the JSC had to permit the media to have access. (Note: Mail and Guardian Limited and Others v Judicial Service Commission and Others (09/30894) [2009] ZAGPJHC 29; [2010] 1 All SA 148 (GSJ); 2010 (6) BCLR 615 (GSJ) (29 July 2009).)

On 28 August, the JSC said that it would not proceed with a full investigation, having decided that there was no prima facie evidence supporting the Constitutional Court judges' complaint; they also decided that it would be "futile" to pursue Hlophe's counter-complaint, because his allegations did not pertain to gross judicial misconduct. The following week, Hlophe returned to work on the bench after over a year on special leave.

=== Civil society challenges: 2009–2011 ===
On 19 April 2010 the high court in Cape Town found the proceedings of the Judicial Service Commission (JSC), where it dismissed a complaint of gross misconduct against Western Cape Judge President John Hlophe, were "unconstitutional and invalid".

The Premier of the Western Cape, Helen Zille, then instituted and urgent motion with the Western Cape High Court that the JSC disciplinary committee's decision should be set aside. Two reasons were supplied in support of this claim. The first was that the JSC's disciplinary committee had not been properly constituted at the time of reaching their decision, by virtue of the fact that three of its constitutionally required thirteen members, including the Premier herself, had not been present. The second was that the decision had not been supported by a majority of the JSC disciplinary committee's full membership, having only six votes for the decision out of a possible thirteen. Judges RJW Jones and S Ebrahim found in favour of the Premier, and ordered that "the proceedings before of the Judicial Services Commission on 20 to 22 July 2009 and 15 August 2009, and the decision to dismiss the complaint and countercomplaint which were the subject of those proceedings" were "unconstitutional and invalid and are set aside".

The JSC and Hlophe then appealed the judgement at the Supreme Court of Appeal (SCA). Judge of Appeal TD Cloete, with Judges Harms, Lewis, Ponnan and Majiedt concurring, dismissed the appeal with costs. Judge Cloete also stated that "it is the constitutional mandate of the JSC in terms of s177 of the Constitution to investigate allegations of judicial misconduct and to make a finding on whether or not a judge is guilty of gross misconduct. The JSC (properly constituted and by majority vote) has done neither. The order made by the court a quo setting the decision of the JSC aside was accordingly imperative to enable the JSC to perform the function it is still obliged to perform."

In a separate case regarding the same decision of JSC, Judge of Appeal PE Streicher of the SCA, with Judges Brand, Cachalia, Theron and Seriti concurring, also upheld an appeal brought by the not-for-profit advocacy group Freedom Under Law, finding that "the decision of the Judicial Service Commission at its meeting on 15 August 2009, that 'the evidence in respect of the complaint does not justify a finding that Hlophe JP is guilty of gross misconduct' and that the matter accordingly be 'treated as finalised', is reviewed and set aside" and setting aside a previous North Gauteng High Court finding to the contrary. The judge also found that the JSC had a "constitutional duty to properly investigate allegations of gross misconduct on part of [a] judge" and that "cross-examination [is] required to resolve disputes of fact".

Legal academic, Pierre de Vos, writes that Hlophe intends to appeal the SCA judgements in the Constitutional Court, adding that this would create "a fascinating constitutional problem which us lawyers will discuss for years to come", since only four of the currently sitting justices of the Constitutional Court were not complainants in the original case, and at least eight of the full eleven Constitutional Court justices are required to constitute a quorum.

=== Revival and stagnation: 2009–2021 ===
It was reported that ten years after the incidences no action had been yet been taken against Hlophe despite the serious nature of the accusations.

== Impeachment proceedings ==
When the JSC upheld the gross misconduct finding in August 2021, it referred to the National Assembly its recommendation for Hlophe's impeachment. Section 177 of the Constitution of South Africa allows for judicial impeachment on grounds of misconduct, but only by a resolution supported by two-thirds of the National Assembly. Although the National Assembly began to process the JSC's referral in 2021, it opted in September of that year to put the matter into abeyance until Hlophe had exhausted his legal appeals. The question did not return to the parliamentary programme until two years later in September 2023.

On 22 November 2023, the Portfolio Committee on Justice and Correctional Services concluded its deliberations and recommended that the House should impeach Hlophe. Over the next few weeks, Hlophe launched, in succession, two attempts to block a vote of the full House: in January, he applied for direct access to the Constitutional Court, where he intended to challenge the constitutionality of the parliamentary proceedings; and in February, he applied in the Western Cape High Court for an urgent interdict against the impeachment vote. The High Court application was dismissed on 21 February 2024, hours before the impeachment vote began. The full National Assembly adopted the Portfolio Committee's report: it voted 305–27 to impeach Hlophe. Ten of the 14 parliamentary political parties – including the ANC and Democratic Alliance – supported the resolution; those who voted against impeachment were members of the Economic Freedom Fighters, African Independent Congress, Pan Africanist Congress, and Al Jama-ah.

On 5 March 2024, the Sunday Independent reported that President Ramaphosa had written to Hlophe to inform him that his impeachment had been effected on 1 March. Ramaphosa released a public confirmation the following day. Hlophe became the first South African judge to be impeached since the end of apartheid, though the National Assembly voted to support a second impeachment – that of Judge Nkola Motata – only minutes after adopting Hlophe's.

== Notable responses ==
=== African National Congress ===
In the wake of the initial revelations in 2008, Zuma's political party, the governing ANC, launched a populist attack on the "counter-revolutionary" posture of the Constitutional Court. The party's secretary-general, Gwede Mantashe, told the Mail & Guardian:

We are saying this [the Hlophe complaint] is a psychological preparation of society for their [judges] pouncing. The issue there is not Hlophe... it's Zuma. The Constitutional Court is sitting in judgement on Zuma [in the Thint matter]. They create a hullabaloo in public that is preparing society for their pouncing. That is the issue. They must give the judgement and not prepare us. They must not use Hlophe as a scapegoat to hit at Zuma. We are watching this case very closely. We are watching what it is that they don't want to say they want to do, that they are preparing us for.

During the same period, the Young Communist League called on the JSC to drop its investigation into Hlophe.

=== Johann Kriegler ===
The JSC's Judicial Conduct Committee order retired Constitutional Court Justice Johann Kriegler to retract critical remarks he made about Hlophe while the saga was ongoing.

== See also ==
- Impeachment in South Africa
