= John Hlophe =

South African judge and politician (born 1959)

The Honourable John Hlophe MP
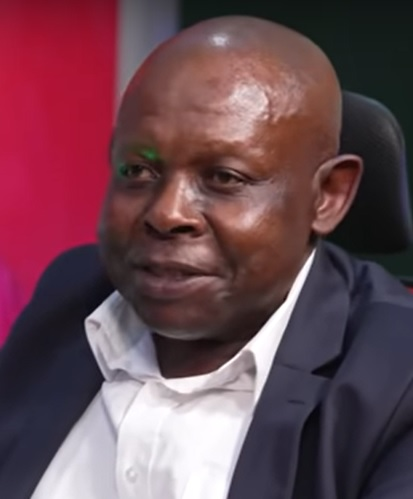

Leader of the Opposition
- Incumbent
- Assumed office 25 June 2024
- President: Cyril Ramaphosa
- Preceded by: John Steenhuisen

Deputy President of the uMkhonto weSizwe Party (MKP)
- In office 22 August 2024 – 4 August 2026
- Preceded by: Position established
- Succeeded by: Duduzane Zuma

Judge President of the Western Cape High Court
- In office 1 May 2000 – 1 March 2024
- Appointed by: Thabo Mbeki
- Deputy: Jeanette Traverso; Patricia Goliath
- Preceded by: Edwin King

Deputy Judge President of the Western Cape High Court
- In office 18 May 1999 – 30 April 2000
- Appointed by: Nelson Mandela
- Preceded by: Edwin King
- Succeeded by: Jeanette Traverso

Judge of the High Court
- In office 1 January 1995 – 1 March 2024
- Appointed by: Nelson Mandela
- Division: Western Cape

Personal details
- Born: Mandlakayise John Hlophe; 19 May 1959 (age 67) Stanger, Natal, South Africa
- Party: uMkhonto weSizwe
- Spouse: Gayaat Salie-Hlophe (m. 2015; div. 2022)
- Education: Ohlange High School
- Alma mater: University of Natal; University of Fort Hare; University of Cambridge; (LLM, PhD)

Mandlakayise John Hlophe (born 19 May 1959) is a South African jurist and politician, currently serving as the Leader of the Opposition of South Africa, as part of the uMkhonto weSizwe Party. He was the party's First Deputy President until he was replaced by Duduzane Zuma, son of Jacob Zuma, on 4 August 2026.

Hlophe was the Judge President of the Western Cape Division of the High Court of South Africa from May 2000 until March 2024, when he was impeached. He was the first South African judge to be impeached under the post-apartheid Constitution.

Born in Stanger, KwaZulu-Natal, Hlophe began his career as a successful legal academic with a specialty in administrative law. He taught at the University of Natal from 1988 to 1990 and at the University of Transkei from 1990 to 1994. After joining the Cape High Court bench in January 1995, he rose quickly through the judicial ranks, becoming Deputy Judge President in May 1999 and Judge President in 2000. He was shortlisted for elevation to the Constitutional Court in 2009.

Known as a vocal proponent of demographic transformation in the South African judiciary, he was a divisive figure in Western Cape legal society. In 2005, he accused various colleagues of racism in a report that was leaked to the press and widely circulated. While his supporters heralded him as a future Chief Justice, he became increasingly embroiled in controversy, and he was the subject of numerous complaints to the Judicial Service Commission, including one from the Cape Bar Council, one from Deputy Judge President Patricia Goliath, and one from the judges of the Constitutional Court.

In the latter regard, in 2008, two judges of the Constitutional Court accused Hlophe of having attempted improperly to influence their judgment in matters involving President Jacob Zuma. After a prolonged legal battle, the Judicial Service Commission found him guilty of gross misconduct in August 2021, and the National Assembly of South Africa resolved to impeach him on 21 February 2024.

== Early life and education ==
Hlophe was born on 19 May 1959 in Madundube, a rural area of Stanger in the former Natal Province (present-day KwaZulu-Natal). His clan name is Samela. His father, originally from Port Shepstone, worked as a security guard and later as a traditional healer, while his mother, originally from East Pondoland, worked as a sugarcane cutter and gardener. The younger of two brothers, he later said that his childhood home was a mud hut in the bush, located a six-kilometre walk from his school.

He began school in 1967 at the Prospect Farm Primary School in Stanger, and spent weekends and holidays doing household tasks for his mother's employer, farmer Ian Smeaton. He became politically conscious as a result of the 1976 Soweto uprising and his education at the Ohlange High School in nearby Durban, where he matriculated in 1978. His interest in law was inspired by an attorney friend of Smeaton's, whose car Hlophe washed; he later said, "I admired him and thought I wanted to be like him and drive a car like his. Washing his car made me feel very special then."

Though both of Hlophe's parents died in 1980, Smeaton continued to sponsor his education. He attended the University of Fort Hare from 1979 to 1981, completing a BJuris, and went on to complete an LLB at the University of Natal in 1983. At the University of Natal, he studied administrative law with Lawrence Baxter, under whom he wrote his first academic article, a note on lobolo in Zulu customary law. After graduating, he was a fellow at the Legal Resources Centre in Durban, until, in 1984, he moved to Cambridge, England for further study. Supported by a Livingstone Trust scholarship, he completed an LLM at Cambridge University in 1984. He returned briefly to Natal in 1985, lecturing in law at the University of Zululand's KwaDlangezwa campus, but later that year he undertook doctoral studies at Cambridge on an Africa Educational Trust scholarship. He completed his PhD in 1988.

== Academic career ==
Later in 1988, Hlophe joined the faculty of the University of Natal, becoming a lecturer in law at the university's Pietermaritzburg campus. He worked there for two years before, in 1990, he moved to Mthatha, Eastern Cape to join the University of Transkei. He was promoted to professor and head of public law in 1992. As an academic, he was a founding member of the university's legal aid clinic and the chief editor of the Transkei Law Journal. His students included Dumisa Ntsebeza. He also conducted side-work as a mediator and arbitrator, through the Independent Mediation Service of South Africa, and as a consultant on matters of labour law and industrial relations.

While living in Mthatha, Hlophe was a member of the Industrial Court of Transkei, and in 1994 he became an ad hoc member of the Industrial Court of South Africa. In the interim, in 1993, he was admitted as an advocate of the Supreme Court of Transkei.

== Cape High Court: 1995–2024 ==
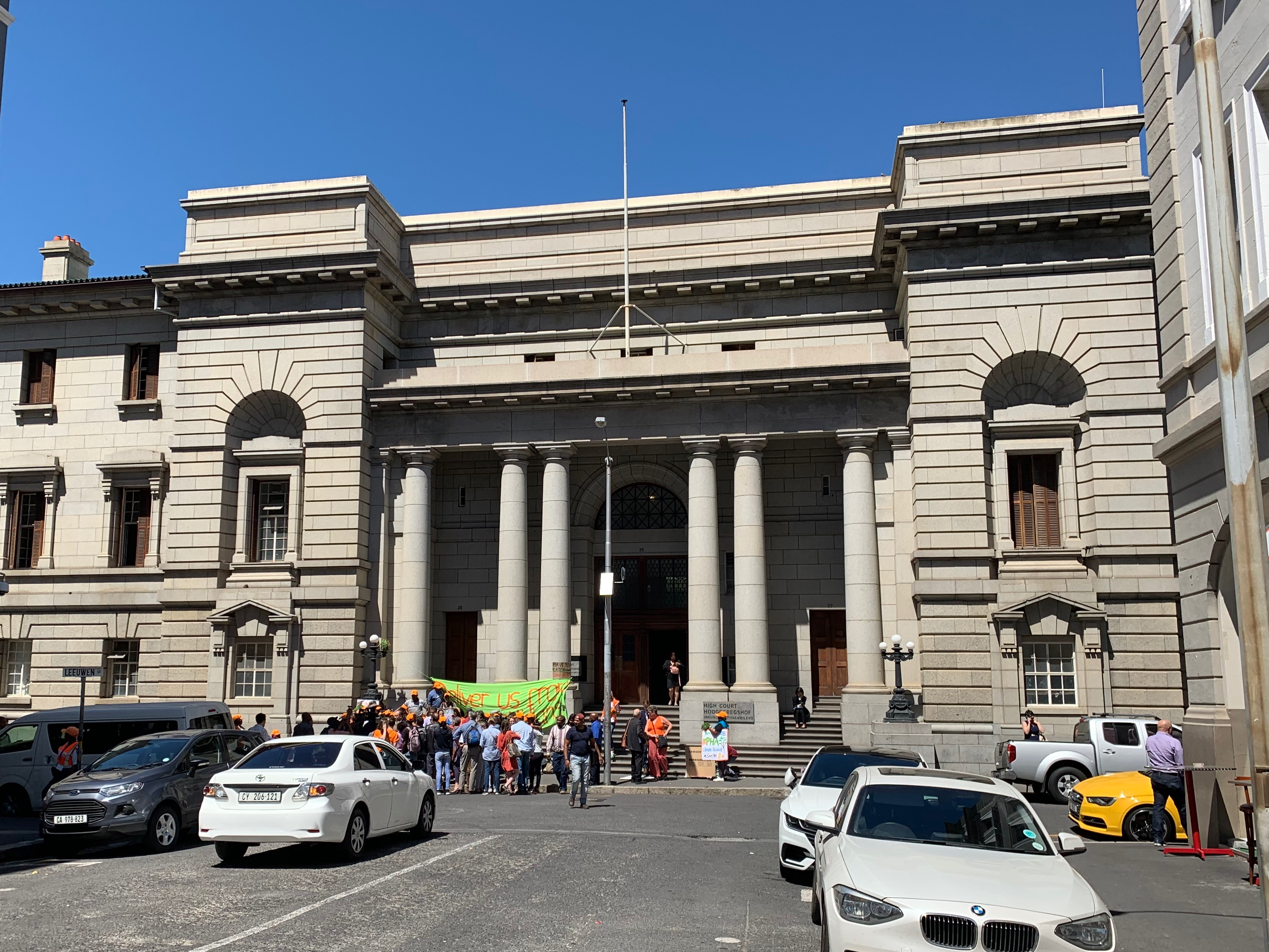
The Cape High Court in Cape Town

Shortly after the end of apartheid, newly elected President Nelson Mandela appointed Hlophe as a judge of the Cape Provincial Division of the Supreme Court of South Africa (later a division of the High Court of South Africa). He took office on 1 January 1995 and, aged 35, he was one of the youngest judges in the country. According to some reports, he was the first black judge to join the Cape bench, as well as the first judge to join the post-apartheid judiciary directly from academia. During his early tenure as an acting judge and judge, he was the protégé of Judge President Gerald Friedman.

After serving as the division's acting Deputy Judge President in 1998, he was permanently appointed to that position on 18 May 1999. The following year, on 1 May 2000, he succeeded Edwin King as the division's Judge President. Lawyer Paul Hoffman later speculated that his rapid professional rise was partly due to his personal popularity, describing him as having been "charm personified at first, showing a willingness to learn the ropes and a preparedness not to take himself too seriously."

=== Notable cases ===
In the assessment of the Daily Maverick, Hlophe was generally a talented jurist and "it was his conduct as a judicial officer that sank what could have been a brilliant and transformative career". Similarly, while admiring his "intellectual pedigree", Hugh Corder remarked that, "not every good academic makes a good judge". Constitutional law judgments written by Hlophe were upheld by the Supreme Court of Appeal in De Lille v Speaker of the National Assembly and by the Constitutional Court in SATAWU v Garvas. His other notable judgments include Mabuza v Mbatha, on the recognition of customary marriage, which the Constitutional Court cited in Bhe v Magistrate, and Magewu v Zozo, on child maintenance, which the Constitutional Court cited in S v M. In the 2021 matter of S v Bongo, Hlophe dismissed corruption charges against former cabinet minister Bongani Bongo, who was accused of offering bribes to obstruct a state capture probe at Eskom; the Supreme Court of Appeal overruled his judgment and ordered a retrial in 2024.

==== Minister of Health v New Clicks ====
In 2004, Hlophe presided in Minister of Health v New Clicks, which gave rise to personal as well as legal controversy. In August, Hlophe's court dismissed the application, which was an urgent challenge by pharmaceutical companies to medical pricing regulations newly promulgated by the Minister of Health. The majority judgment was written by Judge James Yekiso, joined by Hlophe, and opposed in a dissenting judgment by Deputy Judge President Jeanette Traverso. When the court was hearing the pharmaceutical companies' application for leave to appeal, Hlophe caused a stir by complaining that legal practitioners were circulating rumours that he had written the majority judgment in Yekiso's name. He apparently linked this misconception to racism, and in the weeks thereafter, he complained publicly about "a calculated attempt to undermine the intellect and talent of African judges". He later accused Deputy Judge President Traverso of having started the rumour in question.

In the interim, Hlophe's court delayed handing down a decision on the applicants' leave to appeal its judgment. As a result, the applicants took the highly unusual step of approaching the Supreme Court of Appeal directly, effectively leapfrogging the High Court. The Supreme Court agreed to hear both the application for leave to appeal and argument on the merits. After those hearings had taken place, and while the Supreme Court's judgment was reserved, Hlophe handed down the High Court's own ruling in early December: he refused the applicants leave to appeal. This was an extremely surprising decision, because South African courts generally permitted appeals of split judgments as a matter of course. In the ruling, Hlophe castigated the applicants and their counsel, notably Jeremy Gauntlett, for having approached the Supreme Court before the High Court had made its decision. This led the leaders of the Cape Bar Council to issue a lengthy statement defending Gauntlett.

Notwithstanding Hlophe's decision to deny leave to appeal, the Supreme Court of Appeal handed down its own unanimous judgment three weeks later. The Supreme Court, quite contrary to the High Court, not only granted leave to appeal but also upheld the appeal, overturning the High Court's judgment. Judge of Appeal Louis Harms was highly critical of Hlophe's conduct, but, when asked about Harms's remarks, Hlophe told the Star, "To be frank, I couldn't care less."

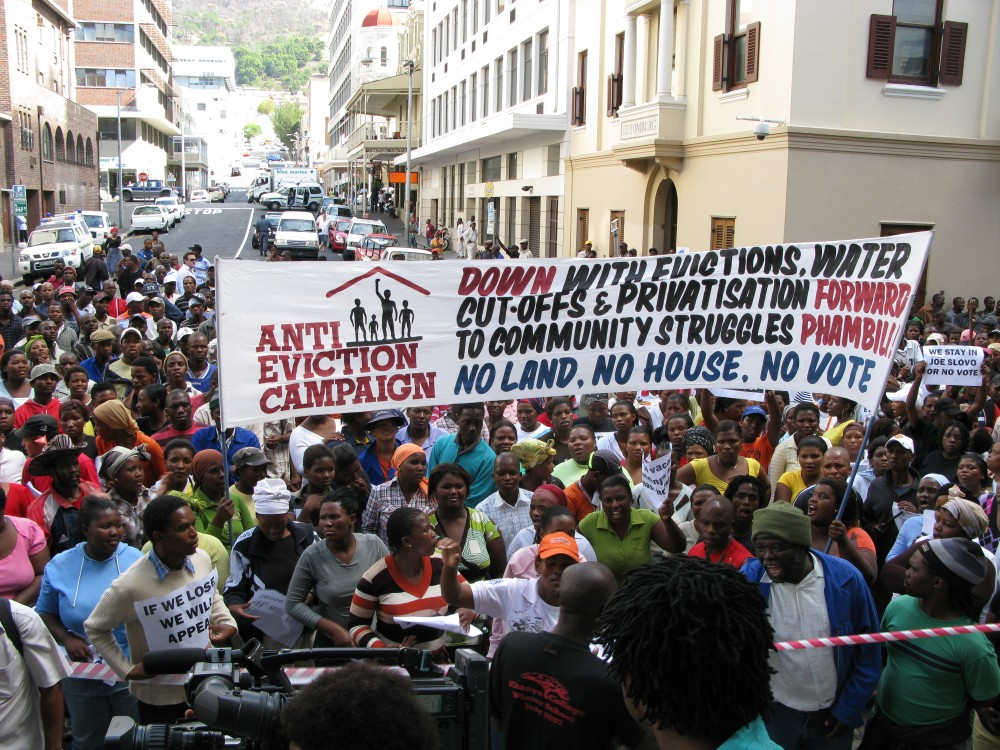
Western Cape Anti-Eviction Campaign protestors outside the Cape High Court on 10 March 2008

==== Thubelisha Homes v Various Occupants ====
In March 2008, Hlophe handed down judgment in Thubelisha Homes v Various Occupants, in which he controversially awarded the state an eviction order to remove thousands of residents of Joe Slovo from the site of the N2 Gateway Project. The judgment was criticised by the Western Cape Anti-Eviction Campaign; by Pierre de Vos, who called it "completely devoid of compassion and also legally misguided"; and by other commentators who questioned its interpretation of the doctrine of legitimate expectations.

When the Constitutional Court heard the matter on appeal, Justice Kate O'Regan said that Hlophe's order "really bothers me" insofar as it failed to provide for the relocation of the evicted residents. This concern ultimately led the court to overturn Hlophe's judgment in part: in Residents of Joe Slovo Community v Thubelisha Homes, the Constitutional Court sanctioned the eviction but imposed certain conditions on the state.

==== Mulaudzi v Old Mutual ====
In 2014, Hlophe presided in an application in Mulaudzi v Old Mutual, a matter in which his personal attorney, Barnabas Xulu, represented the applicant; he granted the application over the objections of the respondent, Old Mutual, who argued that his relationship with Xulu created a reasonable apprehension of bias. In a 2017 judgment described as "scathing", the Supreme Court of Appeal overturned Hlophe's order, saying that the respondents were correct to point out a reasonable apprehension of bias; per Judge of Appeal Nathan Ponnan, the problem was not only Hlophe's relationship with Xulu but also that his judgment relied on shallow and partial reasoning.

=== 2005 racism row ===
In February 2005, South African media houses received a leaked copy of a 43-page report on racism among the lawyers and judges of the Cape Provincial Division; it had been compiled by Hlophe and submitted to the national Minister of Justice, Brigitte Mabandla. Among other things, the report singled out three individuals as racist: Deputy Judge President Traverso, Senior Counsel Gauntlett, and Hlophe's predecessor, retired Judge President King. Observers believed that the report – and particularly Hlophe's hostile attitude toward Gauntlett – stemmed from lingering resentments over the 2004 New Clicks saga; indeed, Hlophe's report proposed that, "It all started with the New Clicks matter".

Amid the ensuing furore, Chief Justice Arthur Chaskalson appointed a committee to consider the report and investigate Hlophe's claims. In early October 2005, as the racism row simmered, press reported on two incidents in which Hlophe had apparently disparaged white colleagues. Noseweek reported that, in a meeting in his chambers earlier that year, Hlophe had told a junior white attorney, Joshua Greeff, "You're nothing but a piece of white shit and it's time you go back to Holland." Hlophe denied having said this, but another lawyer, Senior Counsel Dirk Uijs, signed an affidavit stating that he had been present in the meeting and had heard the exchange; this affidavit was attached to a formal complaint laid by the Cape Bar against Hlophe at the Judicial Service Commission (JSC).

Also in October, press reported that Hlophe had disparaged Western Cape Judge Wilfred Thring while attending a cricket match in a social capacity. According to these reports, Hlophe said that he had allocated Mikro Primary School v Western Cape Minister of Education, a high-profile language rights matter, to Thring "because I knew he would fuck up the trial and then it could be set right on appeal". These remarks were apparently made in the presence of Norman Arendse, the chairperson of the General Council of the Bar, who reportedly told Chief Justice Chaskalson about the incident in a letter. While Hlophe denied the reports as part of a smear campaign against him, the Democratic Alliance called for the JSC to take "decisive action" on allegations of racism by Hlophe.

The row was highly divisive in the Western Cape. On 14 October, Judge Siraj Desai drafted and published a statement in defence of Hlophe; signed by 13 of the Cape Division's 28 judges, the statement expressed alarm that the allegations against Hlophe were "patently calculated to impede the transformation agenda of the judiciary". The Black Lawyers' Association (BLA) likewise said that it would lodge a complaint with the South African Human Rights Commission about what it described as the Cape Bar Council's opposition to demographic transformation. Later that week, during a three-day JSC meeting in Cape Town, recently appointed Chief Justice Pius Langa presided over attempts to negotiate a resolution to the controversy, and the Cape Bar Council dropped its complaint against Hlophe in respect of the Greeff incident. Langa announced on 19 October that no further action would be taken against any of the parties, all of whom had agreed to "stabilise relationships between the judiciary and legal profession of this province".

Before 2004 I was a darling of the legal profession, I was scholarly, writing beautiful judgements… I was loved by everybody. Even Mogoeng Mogoeng said to me that I was tipped to be the Chief Justice before him... It all started with the racism report where I mentioned big names of individuals... and to this day I never had peace. There were attempts to even sue me, there were attempts to insult me year in year out... But before that I was adored, I was revered, I was the darling of the profession. I used to do so much. I would train judges, I would be called to investigate this and that... all of that now is the thing of the past. I am now publicly insulted and nullified and treated like a corrupt person or an illegitimate child of the family. It all started when I told the truth about the legal profession.

— Hlophe's reflections on his 2004 report on racism, March 2024

=== Conflict of interest complaints ===
In 2006, the JSC confronted a mounting stack of complaints against Hlophe, including several lodged by opposition politician Steve Swart, a representative of the African Christian Democratic Party, and by advocate Peter Hazell, who sought Hlophe's impeachment. The most important complaints related to alleged conflicts of interest that had been the subject of media reports and considerable controversy. In 2006 and 2007, the JSC deliberated at length on the question of whether the complaints provided grounds for Hlophe's impeachment. Hlophe responded with consistent denials of wrongdoing and occasionally with levity: in one court hearing in the Travelgate prosecutions, Hlophe jokingly asked whether he was required to disclose having accepted a bottle of water from lawyer Seth Nthai.

==== Smith Tabata Buchanan Boyes ====
The first conflict-of-interest complaint pertained to the Cape Town law firm Smith, Tabata, Buchanan, Boyes (STBB), which had awarded a bursary to Hlophe's son Thuthuka. An STBB partner, Derek Wille, had become friends with Hlophe at the University of Natal in 1982 and had been an acting judge on Hlophe's bench. The firm denied that Hlophe had received any special treatment, and the JSC dismissed the complaint in 2006, accepting Hlophe's evidence that he had lacked any knowledge of the bursary payments to his son – at the time, his son was not living at home but was employed as a boarder-master at the South African College Schools.

==== Oasis Group ====
The second, more serious complaint pertained to Oasis Group Holdings, an investment firm that appeared in Hlophe's court on several occasions. Hlophe's relationship to Oasis was first reported on in early 2005, when Oasis was suing Hlophe's colleague, Judge Siraj Desai, for defamation. Civil lawsuits against sitting judges could not go ahead without the authorisation of the Judge President and, in the case of Oasis, Desai alleged that Hlophe's authorisation had been improperly given. At the time, IOL reported that Hlophe's Umlibo Trust part-owned the Oasis Asset Management Company, one of the Oasis Group's holdings.

In a major escalation in March 2006, Noseweek reported that Hlophe had received a monthly retainer from Oasis while serving as Judge President. According to initial reports, he received R10,000 a month as a legal consultant to the company between April 2002 and March 2003. Evidence later submitted in Desai's defamation case suggested that he had received a total of almost R500,000 over a 39-month period: a once-off payment of R25,000 in 2002; R120,000 across twelve payments in 2003; R147,500 across twelve payments in 2004; R150,000 across twelve payments in 2005; and R25,000 across two payments in 2006. The evidence also showed that Hlophe had declined to authorise the defamation lawsuit on several occasions from December 2001 onwards, before in October 2004 he allowed the lawsuit to go ahead.

Hlophe said that the payments were not a retainer but recompense for "expenses" he had incurred as an Oasis trustee. On the accusation that he had failed to disclose a conflict of interest, he said that former Justice Minister Dullah Omar had given him permission to receive money from a private company. The incumbent Justice Ministry denied having any knowledge of such an agreement, and the Mail & Guardian pointed out that Omar had left the Justice Ministry in 1999, over a year before the relevant Oasis vehicle was established. Critics suggested that Hlophe's receipt of the payments might constitute a criminal violation of the Prevention and Combating of Corrupt Activities Act, as well as "an egregious conflict of interest". In April 2006, Justice Minister Mabandla said that she had granted Hlophe's request to take long leave while the JSC was investigating the allegations. He told the press that he would use the break to finish writing his autobiography, From Gardener to Judge.

In early December 2006, the JSC announced that it had decided not to pursue the matter, saying that there was no evidence to contradict Hlophe's assertion that Minister Omar had authorised him to receive money from Oasis. The Mail & Guardian reported that the JSC was starkly divided on the matter, with advocate George Bizos leading the charge for a full public investigation. By mid-2007, the matter had been revived by Hazell's impeachment campaign and by Hlophe's other antagonists in civil society. However, on 4 October 2007, the JSC announced that it would not pursue the matter further. Chief Justice Langa said that the panel was in unanimous agreement that it had been inappropriate for Hlophe not to disclose his relationship with Oasis, but nonetheless had been divided on whether there was sufficient evidence to sustain a public inquiry and impeachment. Sources told the Mail & Guardian that Bizos and Craig Howie had been among the members pushing for further investigation, while Seth Nthai and Bernard Ngoepe were among those who opposed it.

==== JSC exoneration ====
The JSC's announcement in October 2007 led to a flurry of mutual recriminations in the legal society, as Hlophe's critics condemned what they described as a cover up by the JSC. 14 legal academics at the University of Cape Town drafted and signed an open letter expressing concern about the JSC's decision. More controversially, retired Constitutional Court Justice Johann Kriegler wrote an open letter in the Sunday Times in which he argued that Hlophe was not fit to hold judicial office. Eight silks of the Cape Bar signed another open letter, this one in the Cape Times, expressing agreement with Kriegler and calling on Hlophe to resign from the bench. Indeed, the Mail & Guardian reported that members of the Cape Bar Council had met to discuss the matter and were considering organising a boycott of the court.

Conversely, the BLA welcomed the JSC's decision, expressed support for Hlophe, and released a statement suggesting that Kriegler should be sanctioned for "unprecedented and improper grandstanding". The BLA's Dumisa Ntsebeza argued that Kriegler's statement "evinced disrespect" for the JSC.

=== Defamation lawsuit ===
In March 2008, Judge Steven Majiedt of the Northern Cape High Court granted Winston Nagan authorisation to sue Hlophe for defamation. Nagan, a law professor at the University of Florida, had formerly been an acting judge in Hlophe's division and claimed that Hlophe had defamed him in remarks made in the courtroom in 2007; Hlophe had blamed Nagan for delays in certain judgments, saying that other judges had to step in to finalise Nagan's cases. Hlophe opposed the suit. He was served with summons in a R6-million claim in July 2009.

=== Constitutional Court nominations ===
In mid-2009, a private lobby group named the Justice for Hlophe Alliance lodged an unusual "political-style campaign" calling for Hlophe to be appointed as Chief Justice of South Africa after Pius Langa's retirement. Paul Ngobeni was regarded as the leader of this campaign, and its cornerstone was Hlophe's calls for the demographic transformation of the South African judiciary and the "Africanisation" of South African law. Observers believed, however, that his chances were hurt by a pending complaint against him at the JSC.

Sandile Ngcobo became the sole nominee for the Chief Justice position, though Hlophe's supporters continued to position Hlophe as Ngcobo's future successor. Hlophe was, however, one of more than 20 candidates shortlisted for possible appointment to four other vacancies on the Constitutional Court bench. Indeed, the Mail & Guardian identified him as a frontrunner. The JSC interviewed him in Kliptown in September 2009 in the presence of a small group of supporters wearing Hlophe-branded T-shirts. His interview was tense – among other things, he was pressed about the pending and past misconduct complaints – and he was not among the seven judges whom the JSC recommended for elevation.

Over a decade later, as Chief Justice Mogoeng Mogoeng approached retirement in 2021, Hlophe was again nominated for the Chief Justice position, on that occasion by the Black Lawyers Association, the SA Natives Forum, and Democracy in Action. The Economic Freedom Fighters also endorsed his candidacy. However, he was not shortlisted for the vacancy.

=== Gross misconduct and impeachment ===
In June 2008, the bench of the Constitutional Court lodged a formal complaint against Hlophe at the JSC, alleging that he had attempted improperly to interfere with its deliberations in the matter of Thint v NDPP. That matter concerned the ongoing corruption investigation into politician Jacob Zuma, who became the President of South Africa in 2009. Justices Bess Nkabinde and Chris Jafta alleged that Hlophe had attempted to sway their judgment in Zuma's favour. These allegations launched a 15-year-long public controversy and protracted multi-party litigation in multiple courts. At the height of the scandal, Hlophe was placed on special leave between May 2008 and September 2009. He denied the justices' allegations and claimed that they were part of a political conspiracy against Zuma's allies.

In April 2021, a Judicial Conduct Tribunal concluded unanimously that Hlophe had committed gross and impeachable misconduct in attempting improperly to influence Justices Nkabinde and Jafta. The tribunal, chaired by retired Judge Joop Labuschagne, found that Hlophe's actions violated the Constitution and "seriously threatened" the independence and dignity of the Constitutional Court. In August 2021, this finding was endorsed by the JSC, which referred to the National Assembly its recommendation that Hlophe should be impeached in terms of Section 177 of the Constitution. While Hlophe pursued legal appeals, the JSC recommended in July 2022 that Hlophe should be suspended from judicial office pending impeachment proceedings; President Cyril Ramaphosa effected his suspension in December that year.

Despite further legal challenges by Hlophe, the National Assembly adopted a resolution to impeach him on 21 February 2024. On 5 March, the Sunday Independent reported that President Ramaphosa had written to Hlophe to inform him that his impeachment had been effected on 1 March. Ramaphosa released public confirmation the following day. Hlophe became the first South African judge to be impeached since the end of apartheid, followed by Nkola John Motata.

=== Misconduct complaint by Patricia Goliath ===
==== Allegations ====
On 15 January 2020, while Hlophe was battling the Constitutional Court justices' complaint against him, Western Cape Deputy Judge President Patricia Goliath lodged her own complaint against him at the JSC. The complaint traversed a wide range of serious allegations, including that Hlophe had physically assaulted another judge in chambers (later identified as Judge Mushtak Parker), that he had created "a climate of fear and intimidation" in the Western Cape Division, and that he had given nepotistic favourable treatment to his wife, Judge Gayaat Salie-Hlophe. Goliath's compliant said that Hlophe had sidelined her to such an extent that she occupied the deputy judge presidency "in name only"; in her account, this was partly the result of personal resentments stemming from an incident in 2017, when Salie-Hlophe had asked Goliath to take her to the hospital after an altercation at Hlophe's home. Commentators wondered whether this was an oblique reference to a domestic violence incident.

Perhaps most seriously, Goliath alleged that, in 2015, Hlophe had intervened in the administration of Earthlife Africa Johannesburg v Minister of Energy, a politically sensitive case in which civil society groups lodged a successful challenge to President Zuma's Russian nuclear deal. Goliath claimed that Hlophe had attempted to persuade Goliath to allocate the case to two judges whom he perceived as "favourably disposed" toward Zuma; according to her, he informed her that "criticism of former President Jacob Zuma with regard to the controversial nuclear deal was unwarranted".

==== Response ====
Hlophe and Salie-Hlophe responded through their lawyer, Barnabas Xulu, who dismissed Goliath's allegations as baseless rumour-mongering. In subsequent statements, Salie-Hlophe accused Goliath of fostering "an unhealthy obsession with my marriage", and Hlophe alleged that Goliath had encouraged Salie-Hlophe to "file charges of a fake assault" after the 2017 incident, which he denied had involved domestic violence. The General Council of the Bar urged Hlophe and his wife to take special leave pending a JSC inquiry.

The Judicial Conduct Committee appointed Nambitha Dambuza, an appellate judge, to investigate. In March 2021, Dambuza reported that there was no evidence of misconduct by Salie-Hlophe and recommended a broader investigation of the 2017 domestic incident, to include the question of whether Goliath herself had committed misconduct against the Hlophe couple. In November 2023, however, the Judicial Conduct Committee reversed Dambuza's recommendation, concluding that there was no need to investigate Goliath and that Hlophe should face an impeachment charges in respect of the allegations contained in Goliath's complaint. That process became moot when Hlophe was impeached on separate charges.

==== Alleged assassination plot ====
In mid-2020, at the peak of the dispute between Goliath and Hlophe, a whistleblower alleged that Hlophe had contracted hitmen to assassinate Goliath. Hlophe strongly denied the allegations, which his lawyer called "a corrupt attack on him and ultimately on judicial independence", and he called for a judicial commission of inquiry into the origin of the allegations.

== Political career: 2024–present ==
=== uMkhonto weSizwe Party ===
Hlophe was not on the uMkhonto weSizwe Party's (MKP) original list of candidates for the 2024 South African General Election. On 24 June 2024, Mkhonto weSizwe instructed over 100 members to withdraw from its reserve list of parliamentary candidates to allow 21 new people, including Hlophe, to represent the party in the National Assembly.

In June 2024, Hlophe was selected to represent the uMkhonto weSizwe Party as its chief whip in the National Assembly.

On 5 November 2025, Hlophe was suspended from his role in the party and as Leader of the Opposition following controversial leadership changes within the MK Party. Hlophe, in his capacity as house leader, had sacked the MK's Chief Whip Colleen Makhubele and replaced her with Des van Rooyen. This was following reports that Makhubele "had attempted to secure an MKP service-provider contract worth more than R180 000 per month for a company in which her husband is a director".

==== JSC nomination ====
In July 2024, the MKP nominated Hlophe as their candidate to stand on the Judicial Service Commission (JSC). His nomination was opposed by the Democratic Alliance (DA), Freedom Front Plus (FF+) and the African Christian Democratic Party (ACDP), citing his impeachment as a judge. He was appointed a week later. However a number of parties applied to the court to prevent him from taking his seat, with the court ruling against Hlophe. In October 2024, the MKP withdrew its nomination of Hlophe.

==== Replacement as Deputy President of the MKP ====
On 4 August 2026, it was announced that Jacob Zuma had decided to replace John Hlophe as the MKP's First Deputy President. Zuma appointed his son, Duduzane Zuma, to the role instead. It was however confirmed that Hlophe would continue as Leader of the Opposition. At the same time, Jacob Zuma removed longtime ally Nathi Nhleko from the role of MKP National Chair, appointing Mxolisi Phakathi to the position.

== Personal life ==
Hlophe was formerly married to Nompumelelo Hlophe (née Shongwe), with whom he had children. He was later married to Judge Gayaat Salie-Hlophe between 2015 and 2022; he converted to Islam ahead of the marriage. One of his children, Thuthuka Hlophe, pled guilty to fraud in 2012.

Commentators often teased Hlophe for his apparent penchant for luxury goods. This was partly the result of his infamous fondness for game hunting and winemaking; among his various business interests was a stake in a wine farm in Agter-Paarl and a company called Malebo Farmer's Wine, which he formed in 2005 with an eye to branding "Hlophe shiraz". It was also the result of reports that, in 2007, he wrote to the Department of Transport and Public Works with a request to upgrade his official vehicle, a Mercedes-Benz ML500, to a Porsche Cayenne. In June 2011, he was briefly arrested on the N1 near Kraaifontein for a traffic offence; he paid an admission of guilt fine for overloading his bakkie.

== See also ==
- Impeachment in South Africa
