= Nambitha Dambuza =

South African judge

The Honourable Nambitha Dambuza

Judge of the Constitutional Court
- Incumbent
- Assumed office May 2026
- Appointed by: Cyril Ramaphosa

Judge of the Supreme Court of Appeal
- In office June 2015 – April 2026
- Appointed by: Jacob Zuma

Judge of the High Court
- In office 2005 – June 2015 (Acting: 2003 – 2005)
- Appointed by: Thabo Mbeki
- Division: Eastern Cape

Personal details
- Born: 31 October 1964 (age 61) King Williams Town; Cape Province, South Africa
- Education: University of Natal (LLB); Tulane University (LLM)

Nambitha Dambuza (born 31 October 1964) is a South African judge of the Constitutional Court. A former attorney, she sat in the Eastern Cape High Court from 2005 to 2015, and in the Supreme Court of Appeal from 2015 until her appointment to the Constitutional Court in May 2026.

== Early life and career ==
Born on 31 October 1964 in King Williams Town, Dambuza matriculated at St John's College in Mthatha in the former Cape Province. She read law at the University of Natal, where she completed a BProc and an LLB in 1987 and 1989 respectively, and completed her articles at Nzimande and Mbuli, a law firm in Durban. After completing an LLM at Tulane University in New Orleans, she returned to South Africa in 1992 to begin work as a practicing attorney.

== Judicial career ==
=== Eastern Cape High Court: 2003–2015 ===
In April 2003, Dambuza was appointed as an acting judge in the Eastern Cape Division of the High Court of South Africa. After two years in an acting capacity, she was permanently appointed to the bench, where she served until 2015. At the same time, after a period as an acting justice of the Competition Appeal Court in 2009, she was appointed permanently to that court in 2010. In November 2013, when Chief Justice Mogoeng Mogoeng took long leave, Dambuza was appointed as an acting justice of the Constitutional Court. She held that position into 2014 and wrote a dissenting judgement in Malan v City of Cape Town in 2014. She was later an acting judge in the Supreme Court of Appeal from 2014 to 2015.

In April 2015, Dambuza was interviewed by the Judicial Service Commission as a candidate for permanent appointment to the Supreme Court of Appeal. The Mail & Guardian said that she was a popular candidate, regarded by her peers as "progressive and constitutionally minded". The Judicial Service Commission recommended her appointment, which President Jacob Zuma confirmed in June 2015.

=== Supreme Court of Appeal: 2015–2026 ===
While sitting in the Supreme Court of Appeal, Dambuza was appointed to chair an inquiry into the conduct of Western Cape High Court judge Gayaat Salie-Hlophe, following a complaint by Patricia Goliath against Salie-Hlophe and her husband, John Hlophe. Dambuza's inquiry did not find clear evidence of misconduct but recommended further investigation into an altercation at Hlophe's home, which Dambuza said "appears to be at the centre of the total collapse of the relationship" between Hlophe and Goliath.

In early 2020, Dambuza was shortlisted for appointment to the Constitutional Court, but the appointments were postponed because of the COVID-19 pandemic. When the process reopened the following year, Dambuza withdrew her candidature. She was acting Deputy President of the Supreme Court of Appeal between 1 September 2022 and 1 June 2023, while Deputy President Xola Petse acted in the place of former President Mandisa Maya.

=== Constitutional Court: 2026–present ===
In October 2025 Dambuza was again interviewed by the JSC for an appointment to the Constitutional Court, and her name was one of five forwarded to President Cyril Ramaphosa to fill two vacancies on the Court. On 10 April 2026, Ramaphosa announced that Dambuza and Kate Savage would be appointed to the court with effect from 1 May 2026.

== Academic appointments ==
Dambuza has lectured in law at several institutions, including the University of Fort Hare, and she was a visiting professor at Rhodes University in 2016. She is also a former chair of the council of Walter Sisulu University. In January 2023, during a symposium at Stellenbosch University, Dambuza called for a review of the mandatory sentencing regime established by the Criminal Law Amendment Act, No. 105 of 1997. She argued that harsh sentencing had not had the desired deterrent effect, given that the "main driving forces of criminal conduct" in South Africa were "desperate poverty and sheer greed and corruption".

== Personal life ==
Dambuza is a single mother to two daughters.
