= Harms Commission =

South African apartheid-era investigation into assassinations

The Harms Commission of Inquiry into Certain Alleged Murders
- Date: February 1990 to September 1990
- Duration: Six months
- Location: Pretoria, South Africa
- Also known as: Harms Commission
- Participants: Louis Harms (chairperson); Tim McNally (evidence leader); Hermanus du Plessis (investigator)
- Outcome: Controversially rejected claims of the existence of an assassination squad within the South African police and army; Found 'certain individuals' were guilty of breaking 'common law'

The Harms Commission of Inquiry into Certain Alleged Murders, known as the Harms Commission, was established by South African apartheid-era President F.W. de Klerk on 31 January 1990 as a public inquiry to investigate politically motivated assassinations of opponents of the apartheid regime by clandestine death squads within the South African police and the army.

Chaired by Judge Louis Harms, the hearings were held at the Dutch Reformed Church office building in downtown Pretoria between February and September 1990. By June 1990, the commission had heard testimonies from 250 witnesses - ordinary people, policemen and members of the South African army's Civil Cooperation Bureau, an undercover military unit accused of murdering political opponents of the apartheid government.

== Background ==
The commission was established after a public outcry following disturbing revelations made in October 1989 by Almond Nofomela, an askari who was based in Vlakplaas, of his membership in a police hits squad that targeted and killed activists of the African National Congress (ANC) and Pan Africanist Congress (PAC). Nofomela revealed that his previous commander at Vlakplaas was Dirk Coetzee. Coetzee confirmed Nofomela's claims. He gave details of this assassination squad to Vrye Weekblad, an anti-apartheid Afrikaans-language weekly - shocikg the whole world. Soon after these revelations, De Klerk as President was put under immense public pressure to act on the allegations; which resulted in the establishment of the Harms Commission.

== Findings ==
Its findings were described as a "whitewash" and "large-scale cover up",. It was released on 13 November 1990 and rejected the allegations that the police and army had a death unit that clandestinely murdered opponents of the apartheid government . Three former police officers - Dirk Coetzee, Almond Nofomela and David Tshikalanga - were called to come testify at the inquiry and all gave evidence of their involvement in the Vlakplaas counterinsurgent assassination unit but Judge Harms rejected their evidence as being not trustable. Thus the assassinations of Sizwe Kondile, Griffiths Mxenge, David Webster and Anton Lubowski remained a mystery; which forced De Klerk to establish another commission, the Goldstone Commission in 1991.
