= Henriques v Giles =

South African legal case

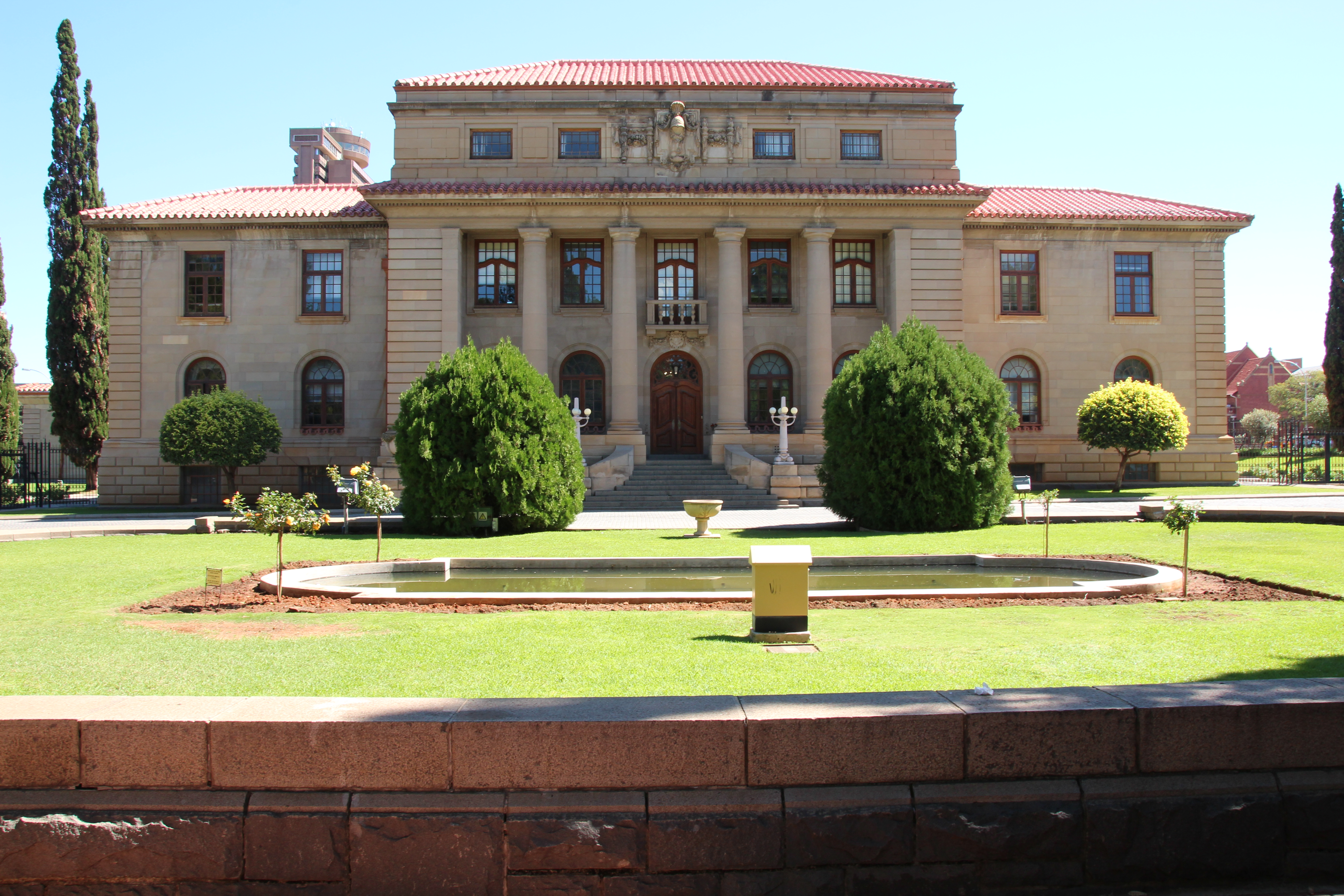
- Court: Supreme Court of Appeal (South Africa)
- Full case name: Henriques v Giles NO and Another; Henriques v Giles NO and Others
- Decided: 29 May 2009
- Docket nos.: 213/08
- Citations: [2009] ZASCA 64; 2010 (6) SA 51 (SCA); [2009] 4 All SA 116 (SCA)

Case history
- Appealed from: Giles NO and Another v Henriques and Others 2008 (4) SA 558 (C) in the High Court of South Africa, Cape of Good Hope Provincial Division

Court membership
- Judges sitting: Navsa JA, van Heerden JA, Mhlantla JA, Kroon AJA and Tshiqi AJA

Case opinions
- Decision by: Van Heerden JA (unanimous)

Keywords
- Rectification of wills; wills, cross-signed

Henriques v Giles NO and Another; Henriques v Giles NO and Others is an important case in the South African law of succession, decided in the Supreme Court of Appeal in May 2009. It concerned the rectification of cross-signed wills. The matter was an appeal from the High Court of South Africa, where it was heard in 2007 by Judge Patricia Goliath of the Cape Town High Court.

== Background ==
In 1999, a husband and wife instructed their accountant to prepare their respective wills. The content of the wills differed considerably. The husband accidentally signed his wife's will; his wife accidentally signed his will. The husband died in 2004, and his wife died the following year.

== Judgment ==
On 29 May 2009, Judge of Appeal Belinda van Heerden delivered judgment on behalf of a unanimous court. In response to a request to rectify both wills, the court held that the husband's will was capable of being rectified, but the wife's will was not: the court was not satisfied that she had the requisite capacity to execute a will due to her affliction with Alzheimer's disease.

== Reception ==
Some commentators regarded the decision and its reasoning as "confusing".
