= Athlone High School =

- Athlone Secondary School

Location
- 39 Calendula Rd, Silvertown; Cape Town, Western Cape; South Africa
- Coordinates: 33°57′43.0″S 18°31′18.9″E

Information
- Motto: Nihil sed Optimus
- Established: 1947; 79 years ago
- Grades: 8–12
- Gender: Co-educational
- Accreditation: Western Cape Education Department

Athlone High School is a public, co-educational high school in Silvertown, Athlone, Cape Town, Western Cape, South Africa.

== History ==
The school was founded in 1947 by the South African poet, author and educator, S. V. Petersen, who remained at the school for 28 years until his retirement in 1974.

== Notable alumni ==
- Patricia Goliath
- Yusuf Karaan
- Essa Moosa
- Denise Newman
- Dulcie September
