= Mineral Sands Resources v Reddell =

South African legal case

- Court: Constitutional Court of South Africa
- Full case name: Mineral Sands Resources Propriety Limited and Another v Christine Reddell and Others
- Decided: 14 November 2022
- Docket nos.: CCT 66/21
- Citations: [2022] ZACC 37; 2023 (2) SA 68 (CC); 2023 (7) BCLR 779 (CC)

Case history
- Prior actions: Mineral Sands Resources v Reddell; Mineral Commodities v Dlamini; Mineral Commodities Limited v Clarke [2021] ZAWCHC 22 in the High Court of South Africa, Western Cape Division
- Related action: Reddell v Mineral Sands Resources [2022] ZACC 38

Court membership
- Judges sitting: Kollapen J, Madlanga J, Majiedt J, Mathopo J, Mhlantla J, Theron J, Tshiqi J, Mlambo AJ, and Unterhalter AJ

Case opinions
- A SLAPP suit defence exists in South African law as a species of the common law doctrine of abuse of process.
- Decision by: Majiedt J (unanimous)

Keywords
- Abuse of process; consideration of the merits; defamation; SLAPP suit defence; ulterior purpose

Mineral Sands Resources (Pty) Ltd and Others v Reddell and Others is a decision of the Constitutional Court of South Africa which affirmed a common law defence against strategic litigation against public participation (SLAPP) lawsuits. It was heard on 17 February 2022 and decided on 14 November 2022 in a unanimous judgment written by Justice Steven Majiedt. The Constitutional Court ruled that it is proper to identify and dismiss SLAPP suits as an abuse of process, but that such a determination rests on the merits of the suit in question, as well as on its motives.

Mineral Sands Resources v Reddell is one of a pair of Constitutional Court judgements arising from a series of defamation suits laid by two mining companies against six environmental activists; the other, decided at the same time, is Reddell v Mineral Sands Resources.

== Background ==
The applicants were two mining companies, Mineral Commodities Limited and its South African subsidiary, Mineral Sands Resources, as well as two of the companies' directors. The respondents were six environmental activists and lawyers – Christine Reddell, Tracey Davies, Davine Cloete, Mzamo Dlamini, Cormac Cullinan, and John Clarke – whom, in three consolidated court actions, the respondents had sued for defamation. The allegedly defamatory statements were critical of the mining companies' controversial operations at the Xolobeni titanium mine on the Wild Coast and the Tormin sand mine on the West Coast.

== High Court action ==
The defamation suits were heard in the Western Cape High Court as Mineral Sands Resources (Pty) Ltd and Another v Reddell and Others; Mineral Commodities Limited and Another v Dlamini and Another; Mineral Commodities Limited and Another v Clarke [2021] ZAWCHC 22. Deputy Judge President Patricia Goliath heard the matter.

Seeking to quash the defamation suit, the activists (the respondents in the High Court action) raised two special pleas against in the High Court, both of which were met with exception from the mining companies; arguments on the exception were heard on 9 June 2020. The first special plea raised the so-called corporate defamation defence. The High Court upheld the mining companies' exception to this plea, finding that it was not competent. However, the High Court upheld the second special plea, finding that it disclosed a proper defence to a defamation claim. The substance of that plea was that the defamation suit was a strategic litigation against public participation (SLAPP) suit and that SLAPP suits, in turn, constituted abuse of process under South African law. It was the first time that such a legal strategy had been tested against SLAPP suits in South Africa.

The High Court dismissed the defamation suit on 9 February 2021 when it upheld the SLAPP suit special plea. Both parties appealed the High Court's order: the activists appealed the High Court's decision to dismiss the first plea, while the mining companies appealed the High Court's decision to uphold the second plea. The appeals were consolidated for the purposes of the Constitutional Court's hearing, but were dealt with in separate judgements: Reddell and Others v Mineral Sands Resources (Pty) Ltd and Others (CCT 67/21) concerns the corporate defamation plea, and Mineral Sands Resources v Reddell concerns the SLAPP suit plea.

== Judgment ==
In a unanimous judgement written by Justice Steven Majiedt, the Constitutional Court agreed with the respondent that a SLAPP suit defence was provided for in the existing common law doctrine of abuse of process. However, the court distinguished SLAPP suits from other forms of abuse of process, including frivolous and vexatious litigation and unlawful arrests. According to the court, identifying SLAPP suits requires considering a distinctive combination of the suit's merits, its motives, and its consequences. According to Majiedt:

A common feature of SLAPP suits is that the primary aim of the litigation is not to enforce a legitimate right. The objective is to silence or fluster the opponent, tie them up with paperwork or bankrupt them with legal costs. Therefore, the hallmark of a SLAPP suit is that it often (but not necessarily always) lacks merit, and that it is brought with the goals of obtaining an economic or other advantage over a party by increasing the cost of litigation to the point that the party’s case will be weakened or abandoned. They are primarily legal proceedings that are intended to silence critics by burdening them with the cost of litigation in the hope that their criticism or opposition will be abandoned or weakened. In a typical SLAPP suit, the plaintiff does not necessarily expect to win its case, but will have accomplished its objective if the defendant yields to the intimidation, mounting legal costs or exhaustion and abandons its defence and also, importantly, its criticism of and opposition to the project or development. It appears from this initial analysis that both merit and motive play a role in the test for a SLAPP suit and the one may inform the other.

In this respect, the court struck a middle ground between the positions of the disputants: while the applicants argued that SLAPP suits should be identified and disposed with solely on the basis of their merits, the respondents submitted that the only criterion should be the motives of the plaintiff (and specifically the presence or absence of an ulterior purpose). In this respect, the court disagreed with the High Court, which had sided with the activists in finding that the SLAPP suit defence to defamation requires no consideration whatsoever of the merits of the defamation claim.

Therefore, although SLAPP suits could be demonstrated to constitute abuse of process, the court found that the respondents had failed to demonstrate this in their special plea in the High Court, insofar as their argument focused narrowly on the ulterior purpose argument; such a plea, the court ruled, was insufficient to establish a defence to defamation. The court upheld the mining companies' appeal and set aside the High Court's order, though it afforded the activists 30 days to seek leave to amend the special plea.

== Subsequent action ==
The parties reached a partial settlement in the defamation action in November 2023.
