= Truter v Deysel =

South African legal case

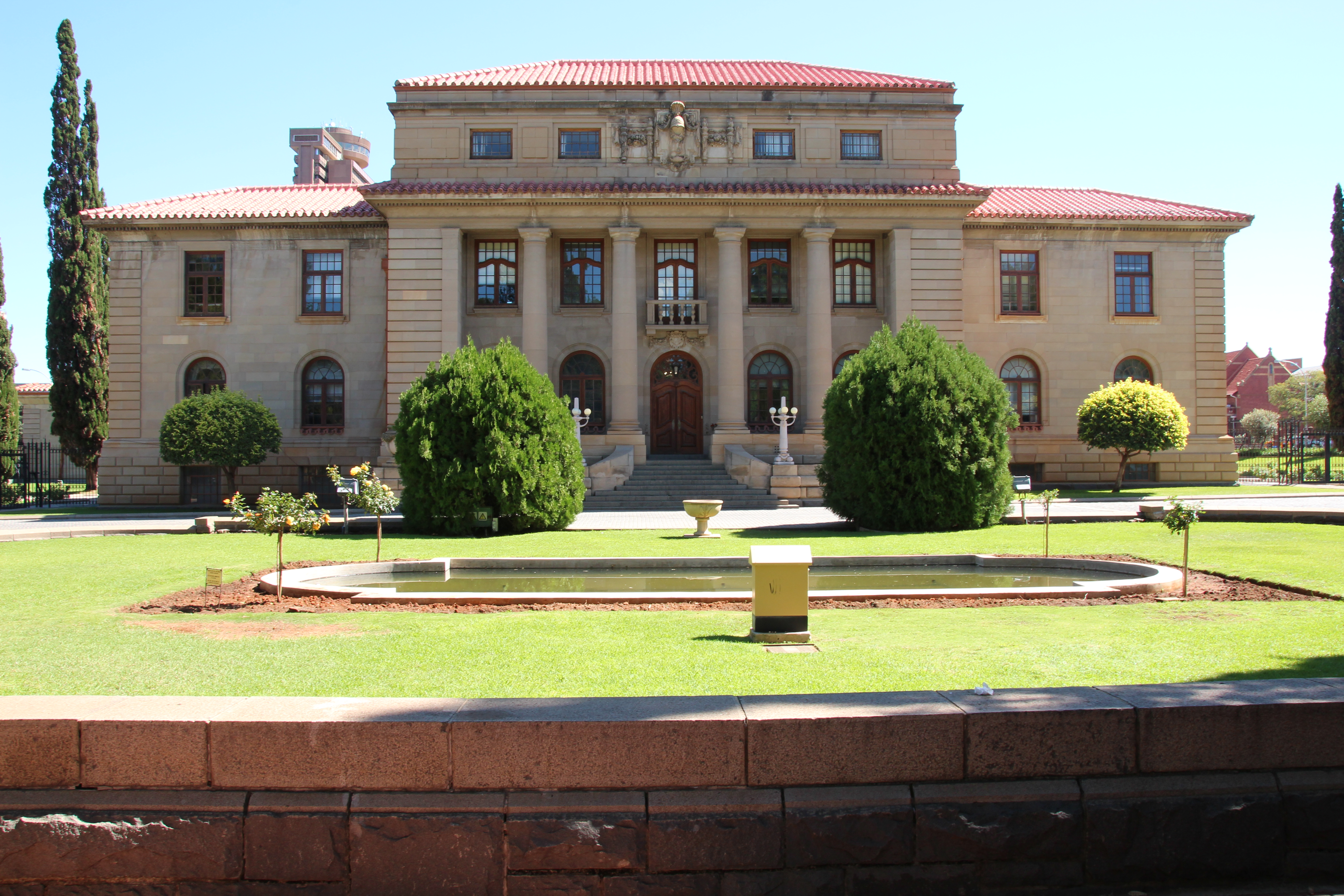
- Court: Supreme Court of Appeal (South Africa)
- Full case name: Truter and Another v Deysel
- Decided: 17 March 2006
- Docket nos.: 043/05
- Citations: [2006] ZASCA 16; 2006 (4) SA 168 (SCA)

Case history
- Appealed from: Deysel v Truter and Another 2005 (5) SA 598 (C) in the High Court of South Africa, Cape of Good Hope Provincial Division

Court membership
- Judges sitting: Harms JA, Zulman JA, Navsa JA, Mthiyane JA and van Heerden JA

Case opinions
- Decision by: Van Heerden JA (unanimous)

Keywords
- Cause of action; damages; medical negligence; period of prescription, commencement of

Truter and Another v Deysel is an important case in South African law, with particular resonance in civil procedure and medical malpractice. It is also frequently quoted or invoked for its definition of "cause of action". It was heard in the Supreme Court of Appeal on 24 February 2006; judgment was delivered by Judge of Appeal Belinda van Heerden on 17 March. The case was an appeal from a decision in the Cape Provincial Division of the High Court of South Africa.

The plaintiff's claim was based on delict for personal injury sustained seven years earlier. The case turned on the question of when exactly, in terms of the Prescription Act, 1969, the period of prescription commences. The court held that prescription begins to run when the creditor acquires knowledge, or is deemed to have acquired knowledge, of "the facts from which the debt arises": the creditor acquires a complete cause of action for the recovery of debt when he is in possession of the entire set of facts upon which he relies to prove his claim. The cause of action is therefore complete as soon as the creditor sustains some harm; knowledge of fault or unlawfulness is not required. In this case, therefore, prescription was not delayed by the plaintiff's delay in securing an expert opinion to the effect that the defendants' conduct was negligent; an expert opinion of that kind did not constitute a fact, but instead was evidence.

== Facts ==
The respondent (plaintiff a quo), Marthinus Albertus Deysel, instituted action in the High Court against the appellants (defendants a quo) for damages for personal injury allegedly sustained by him as a result of the negligence of the defendants in their performance on him of certain medical and surgical procedures. The defendants raised a special plea of prescription. It appeared that, although the procedures had been performed on the plaintiff in 1993, it was only in early 2000 that he managed to secure medical opinion to the effect that the defendants had conducted themselves negligently; for that reason, that summons was issued only in April 2000. Under section 11(d) of the Prescription Act, the plaintiff's claim was subject to a three-year extinctive period of prescription

The question which fell for determination by the High Court was the time at which the period of prescription in respect of the plaintiff's claim had commenced to run. The High Court dismissed the special plea, finding that the period of prescription had commenced running only when the plaintiff had managed to secure medical opinion to the effect that the defendants had been negligent.

== Judgment ==
In the Supreme Court of Appeal, Judge of Appeal van Heerden held on behalf of a unanimous bench that under section 12 of the Prescription Act, prescription of a debt (which included a delictual debt) began running when the debt became due. A debt became due, in turn, when the creditor acquired knowledge of the facts from which the debt arose; in other words, when the creditor acquired a complete cause of action for the recovery of the debt, or when the entire set of facts upon which he relied to prove his claim was in place.

The court found that, in a delictual claim, the requirements of fault and unlawfulness were not factual ingredients of the cause of action; they were, rather, legal conclusions to be drawn from the facts. For the purposes of prescription, "cause of action" meant every fact which it was necessary for the plaintiff to prove in order to succeed in his claim, although it did not comprise every piece of evidence which was necessary to prove those facts. An expert opinion, to the effect that certain conduct had been negligent, was not itself a fact, but, rather, evidence.

The plaintiff in the present case, to the mind of Van Heerden, had not lacked capacity to appreciate that a wrong had been done to him. The running of prescription could therefore not be delayed on that ground. In accordance with the "once and for all" rule, a plaintiff's cause of action is complete as soon as he sustains some damage, not only in respect of the damage actually sustained, but also in respect of any damage yet to be sustained. The court found that all of the facts and information in respect of the operations performed on the plaintiff by the defendants had been known, or had been readily accessible, to him and his legal representatives as early as 1994 or 1995. Accordingly, the Supreme Court of Appeal upheld the appeal and the special plea, reversing the decision of the Cape Provincial Division.
