= Nkola John Motata =

South African judge (born 1947)

The Honourable Nkola John Motata

Judge of the High Court
- Incumbent
- Assumed office 6 October 2009 – 2024
- Appointed by: Jacob Zuma
- Division: Eastern Cape

Personal details
- Born: Nkola John Motata; 2 June 1947 (age 79) Alexandra, Transvaal; Union of South Africa
- Education: University of Fort Hare; Witwatersrand University

Nkola John Motata (born 6 February 1947) is a South African-born disgraced high court judge. He made headlines in 2007 when he drove drunk into a property, knocking the wall and quarreling with the property owner using racial slurs.

== Early life ==
Nkola Motata was born in Alexandra, Johannesburg, South Africa. He went to Ithute Primary School in Alexandra and went on to matriculate at Orlando High School in 1966, in Soweto. Motata earned his undergraduate law degree, a BIuris in 1979 at the Fort Hare(1986) and an LLB. He also attended Wits. He did his Diploma in Trial Advocacy in 1992 at Colorado, USA.

== Legal career ==
Motata was admitted as an attorney in 1982 and practised until 1984. Between 1985 and 1986 he studied full-time at Wits University. He was a legal advisor between 1987 and 1988. Matata was admitted as an advocate in 1989 and participated in Johannesburg Bar activities. From 1996 to 1997 he was the chairman of the Black Advocates' Forum (1996–97 ) and was also a member and tutor of Black Lawyers Association as well as a member of the RC Committee on Amnesty. He started acting as an Acting judge in 1999.

== Drunk and diving incident ==
In 2007, Motata crashed his car against a wall in a Hurlingham residence in Sandton, north of Johannesburg. The crash was recorded on a cellphone video where Motata hurdle abuse at the property owner. In 2009 he was found guilty of drunk driving and fined R2000.

On 6 March 2024, President Ramaphosa removed Judge Motata from office. He became the second South African judge to be impeached since the end of apartheid, though the National Assembly voted to support the first impeachment—that of Judge John Hlophe.

== Personal life ==
Motata is married to Ramoraswi Jeannette Makoea and have two children together.
