= Thint v NDPP =

South African legal case

- Court: Constitutional Court of South Africa
- Full case name: Thint (Pty) Ltd v National Director of Public Prosecutions and Others; Zuma and Another v National Director of Public Prosecutions and Others
- Decided: 31 July 2008
- Docket nos.: CCT 89/07, CCT 91/07
- Citations: [2008] ZACC 13; 2008 (2) SACR 421 (CC); 2009 (1) SA 1 (CC); 2008 (12) BCLR 1197 (CC)

Case history
- Prior actions: In the Supreme Court of Appeal: Thint v NDPP [2008] 1 All SA 229 (SCA); NDPP v Zuma and Another [2008] 1 All SA 197 (SCA); In the High Court of South Africa: Zuma and Another v NDPP and Others [2006] ZAKZHC 5 in the Durban and Coast Local Division; Thint and Others v NDPP and Others (268/2006; 4 July 2006, unreported) in the Transvaal Provincial Division
- Related actions: Thint Holdings and Another v NDPP; Zuma v NDPP [2008] ZACC 14

Court membership
- Judges sitting: Langa DCJ, O’Regan ACDJ, Madala J, Mokgoro J, Nkabinde J, Ngcobo J, Skweyiya J, van der Westhuizen J, Yacoob J, Jafta AJ and Kroon AJ

Case opinions
- Decision by: Langa CJ (O'Regan, Jafta, Kroon, Madala, Mokgoro, Nkabinde, Skweyiya, van der Westhuizen and Yacoob concurring)
- Dissent: Ngcobo J

Thint v NDPP is a 2008 decision of the Constitutional Court of South Africa in the area of criminal procedure. It concerns the lawfulness of search and seizure warrants issued in terms of section 29 of the National Prosecuting Authority Act, 1998 in the course of an investigation into serious economic crime. The court implemented several tests for the lawfulness of such warrants and confirmed that the state was not required to provide notice to the subjects of such warrants.

The case was notable partly because of the identity of its plaintiffs: the warrants under scrutiny were issued during the Scorpions' investigation into the Arms Deal and related allegations of corruption by former Deputy President Jacob Zuma and Thales subsidiary Thint. A ten-member majority of the court upheld the warrants as lawful, with only Justice Sandile Ngcobo dissenting. In the interim, while the judgment was reserved, the Constitutional Court bench laid a complaint with the Judicial Service Commission alleging that Judge John Hlophe, claiming to act on behalf of Zuma, had attempted improperly to influence the opinions of Justices Bess Nkabinde and Chris Jafta.

== Background ==
The case comprised two conjoined applications against the National Director of Public Prosecutions, the director of the Scorpions, and other officials of the National Prosecuting Authority. The first application was brought by Thint, the South African subsidiary of arms company Thales, and the second was brought by former Deputy President Jacob Zuma and his attorney, Michael Hulley.

Thint and Zuma were suspected of crimes allegedly committed in connection with corruption in the 1999 Arms Deal. In the course of an investigation into them, the prosecution applied for and obtained 21 search and seizure warrants, issued in terms of section 29 of the National Prosecuting Authority Act, 1998. Only six of the warrants were challenged in the apex court. These were executed respectively at Thint's Pretoria offices, Hulley's Durban offices, Zuma's offices at the Union Buildings and in Durban, and Zuma's Killarney flat and Nkandla homestead. All were issued by Judge President Bernard Ngoepe of the Transvaal Provincial Division.

Most of the warrants were executed simultaneously on 18 August 2005; some 93,000 documents were seized from the applicants' premises. Soon thereafter, in November 2005, Zuma and Thint were indicted on corruption charges.

== Prior actions ==
Following the 2005 raids, both Thint and Zuma challenged certain of the warrants in the High Court of South Africa. Zuma and Hulley successfully obtained an order in the Durban High Court declaring certain of the warrants invalid in February 2006, while Thint was unsuccessful in the Pretoria High Court in a similar application in July 2006. Both High Court judgments were appealed to the Supreme Court of Appeal, which – by a slim three-to-two majority – found against the defendants: it overturned the favourable decision of the Durban High Court and upheld the unfavourable decision of the Pretoria High Court. Though the appellate court considered the applicants separately, it handed down both judgments on 8 November 2007.

The defendants appealed to the Constitutional Court of South Africa, which conjoined their appeals for hearing in March 2008. Thint was represented by Peter Hodes, Zuma by Kemp J. Kemp, and the prosecution by Wim Trengove.

== Majority judgment ==
Delivering judgment on 31 July 2008, Chief Justice Pius Langa dismissed the appeal on behalf of a ten-member majority. The majority was not convinced by any of the applicants' several arguments for the unlawfulness of the warrants. Citing Investigating Directorate: SEO v Hyundai, the court affirmed that the issuance of section 29 warrants must strike a balance between protecting the privacy interests of individuals and not interfering with the state's constitutionally mandated task of prosecuting crime.

In connection with the applicants' various procedural arguments, Langa held that there was no requirement that the prosecution should provide notice to the subjects of a search warrant before applying for such a warrant – indeed, that would be directly contrary to ordinary procedure, and might defeat the purpose of the warrant – and the prosecution had fulfilled its utmost good faith obligation to disclose all material facts during its ex parte application to Judge President Ngoepe. Most importantly, the state had successfully established that a search and seizure operation was reasonable in the circumstances, which was the test set out in section 29 of the National Prosecuting Authority Act; in this case, the operations were reasonable because there was "an appreciable risk, judged objectively, that the state will be unable to obtain the evidence sought by using other means, such as a subpoena".

A second family of objections concerned the substance and text of the warrants, but these too were dismissed. The applicants had argued that the warrants were vague and overbroad, effectively authorising an unbounded search of the relevant premises, contrary to the applicants' constitutional right to privacy. The majority, however, found that the warrants were neither overbroad nor unduly vague; a warrant was intelligible when its terms were reasonably capable of being understood by a reasonably well-informed person, and these warrants passed that test while remaining within the scope of the National Prosecuting Authority Act. Finally, the warrants and their execution had provided sufficient protection for the legal professional privilege of the applicants.

However, Langa did make one concession to the applicants in this regard. Each of the warrants contained what Langa called a "catch-all" paragraph, authorising the search for and seizure of any item that "might have a bearing" on the investigation. The majority found this unproblematic in all cases except for the warrant executed at Hulley's office: in the context of a law office, the catch-all paragraph posed too great a danger that state investigators would see privileged documents while executing the warrant. The court therefore severed that paragraph from the warrant in question, but in all other respects upheld the orders of the Supreme Court of Appeal.

== Minority judgment ==
Justice Sandile Ngcobo filed a dissenting judgment in which he held that the court should uphold the appeals and declare that the search and seizure operations were unlawful. First, he held that the prosecution had not fulfilled the duty of utmost good faith, because it had not disclosed to Judge Ngoepe two "potentially relevant" and therefore material facts: that Thint had cooperated with a previous summons, and that Alain Thétard, a Thint director, had moved to Mauritius. Second, he held that the prosecution had failed to establish that the warrants were reasonable and necessary; it had not demonstrated that other less intrusive measures, such as a subpoena, would not have been equally effective.

== Reception ==
Frank Snyckers criticised the majority's "permissive approach" towards warrants, which he said established

that a search warrant did not have to speak for itself: it did not have to define the offences in question with a degree of particularity that would enable the reasonable reader to identify the particular count and particular incidents at issue; and it did not have to indicate, without reference to the knowledge of the persons conducting the search, in what precise respects items it failed to identify could be said to be relevant to the offences in question. Accordingly, a warrant could specify the offence of, say, fraud, and then authorise the search and seizure of 'any document that might be relevant to the fraud', without indicating to the reader what precise act of fraud committed when by whom was at issue, and how anybody other than the investigating officer or prosecutor might know whether a document in the searched premises was relevant to that fraud. This effectively makes it impossible to take issue, at the search, with the extent to which a particular seizure is authorised by the warrant, as the warrant will be silent in the critical respects necessary to educate the ignorance of the subject being searched.

== Political controversies ==
In late June 2008, a month before delivering its judgment, the Constitutional Court bench jointly submitted a formal complaint to the Judicial Service Commission against John Hlophe, the Judge President of the Cape Provincial Division, alleging that he had attempted improperly to influence their decision in the matter. In the autumn of 2008, while the court's judgment was reserved, Hlophe had separately visited the chambers of Justices Chris Jafta and Bess Nkabinde, pleading for their assistance. He allegedly told Nkabinde that "he had a mandate" to lobby on Zuma's behalf. Langa mentioned the Judicial Service Commission complaint briefly in his majority judgment. This revelation launched a 15-year-long controversy and resulted in Hlophe's impeachment.

Additionally, Ngcobo's dissenting opinion, once handed down, was of interest to observers, particularly after Zuma was elected as President of South Africa and appointed Ngcobo to succeed Langa as Chief Justice. Commentator Pierre de Vos suggested that Ngcobo's dissent might have gained political notice, establishing him as a potential candidate for promotion, and the Mail & Guardian later said that this suspicion prevailed throughout Ngcobo's tenure as Chief Justice.
