= Reddell v Mineral Sands Resources =

South African legal case

- Court: Constitutional Court of South Africa
- Full case name: Christine Reddell and Others v Mineral Sands Resources Proprietary Limited and Others
- Decided: 14 November 2022
- Docket nos.: CCT 67/21
- Citations: [2022] ZACC 38; 2023 (2) SA 404 (CC); 2023 (7) BCLR 830 (CC)

Case history
- Prior actions: Mineral Sands Resources v Reddell; Mineral Commodities v Dlamini; Mineral Commodities Limited v Clarke [2021] ZAWCHC 22 in the High Court of South Africa, Western Cape Division
- Related action: Mineral Sands Resources v Reddell [2022] ZACC 37

Court membership
- Judges sitting: Kollapen J, Madlanga J, Majiedt J, Mathopo J, Mhlantla J, Theron J, Tshiqi J, Mlambo AJ, and Unterhalter AJ

Case opinions
- Save for where the speech forms part of public discourse on issues of public interest, and at the discretion of the court, trading corporations can claim general damages for defamation.
- Decision by: Majiedt J (Madlanga, Mathopo, Mhantla, Theron, Tshiqi, and Mlambo concurring)
- Dissent: Unterhalter AJ (Kollapen concurring)

Keywords
- Section 10 of the Constitution; section 16 of the Constitution; common law right to reputation; constitutionality of awarding damages to trading corporations; defamation; partly unconstitutional; public discourse on issues of public interest

Reddell and Others v Mineral Sands Resources (Pty) Ltd and Others is a 2022 decision of the Constitutional Court of South Africa concerning the right of trading corporations to claim for general damages in defamation suits. A majority of the court upheld that right but qualified that it does not apply to defamation suits arising from public discourse on matters of public importance. Moreover, the court located the right as grounded in a common law personality right rather than as grounded in the Bill of Rights; in that it diverged from the Supreme Court of Appeal's opinion in Media 24 Ltd and Others v SA Taxi Securitisation.

The case was heard on 17 February 2022 and decided on 14 November 2022. It is one of a pair of Constitutional Court judgements arising from a series of defamation suits laid by two mining companies against six environmental activists; the other, decided at the same time, is Mineral Sands Resources v Reddell.

== Background ==
The applicants were two mining companies, Mineral Commodities Limited and its South African subsidiary, Mineral Sands Resources, as well as two of the companies' directors. The respondents were six environmental activists and lawyers – Christine Reddell, Tracey Davies, Davine Cloete, Mzamo Dlamini, Cormac Cullinan, and John Clarke – whom, in three consolidated court actions, the respondents had sued for defamation. The allegedly defamatory statements were critical of the mining companies' controversial operations at the Xolobeni titanium mine on the Wild Coast and the Tormin sand mine on the West Coast.

== High Court action ==
The defamation suits were heard in 2021 by Deputy Judge President Patricia Goliath of the Western Cape High Court. They were consolidated as Mineral Sands Resources (Pty) Ltd and Another v Reddell and Others; Mineral Commodities Limited and Another v Dlamini and Another; Mineral Commodities Limited and Another v Clarke.

Seeking to quash the defamation suit, the activists (the respondents in the High Court action) raised two special pleas against in the High Court, both of which were met with exception from the mining companies; arguments on the exception were heard on 9 June 2020. The first special plea raised the so-called strategic litigation against public participation (SLAPP) suit, and the High Court upheld it as a proper defence and basis for dismissal. However, the second plea mounted the so-called corporate defamation defence, arguing that the mining companies were not entitled to sue for general damages. The High Court upheld the mining companies' exception to that plea, finding that it was not a competent defence.

The High Court dismissed the defamation suit on 9 February 2021 when it upheld the SLAPP suit special plea. Both parties appealed the High Court's order: while the mining companies appealed the High Court's decision to uphold the SLAPP suit plea, the activists appealed the High Court's decision to dismiss the first plea. The appeals were consolidated for the purposes of the Constitutional Court's hearing, but were dealt with in separate judgements: Mineral Sands Resources v Reddell concerns the SLAPP suit plea, and Reddell v Mineral Resources concerns the corporate defamation plea.

== Arguments ==
The applicants argued that trading corporations are not entitled to claim for general damages in defamation suits, because such claims impose unjustifiable restrictions on the constitutional right to freedom of expression. Such restrictions are justifiable when imposed to protect the constitutional right to dignity, but such a right is borne only by natural persons, not by trading corporations; moreover, corporations' interest in their reputations is purely financial, rather than personal, in nature. Therefore, in order to mitigate any restriction on freedom of expression, corporations which sue for general damages for defamation must be held to the same stringent requirements as when they sue for the delict of injurious falsehood. Specifically, they must allege and prove that the statements are false, were made wilfully, and caused patrimonial loss.

In making this argument, the applicants argued that a majority of the Supreme Court of Appeal had erred in Media 24 Ltd and Others v SA Taxi Securitisation, which affirmed that trading corporations can sue for general damages for defamation. The respondents, by contrast, defended the SA Taxi decision as constitutional and otherwise beneficial in such respects as deterring fake news.

== Judgments ==
In its majority judgement, penned by Justice Steven Majiedt, the Constitutional Court partly upheld the activists' appeal, making a declaratory order that "save for where the speech forms part of public discourse on issues of public interest, and at the discretion of the court, trading corporations can claim general damages for defamation." Majiedt agreed with the activists, and disagreed with the majority judgement in SA Taxi, that a purposive reading of section 10 of the Constitution excludes juristic persons from being the bearers of a right to dignity. Nonetheless, he affirmed the common law right of corporations to their "good name and reputation", which is enforceable through defamation claims and sometimes through claims for general damages. However, the protection of that common law personality right must be balanced against the chilling effect that general damages have on freedom of expression, and that limitation exercise is tipped in favour of speech – and against the availability of general damages – when "the nature of the speech is such that it is of public importance". Thus trading corporations are not entitled to claim for general damages "in cases of public discourse in public interest debates", as determined at a court's discretion; in such cases, claims for general damages pose unjustifiable limitations on freedom of expression.

Acting Justice David Unterhalter submitted a dissenting judgement, supported by Justice Jody Kollapen, in which he expressed "some doubt that the right conferred by section 10 of the Constitution cannot be enjoyed by a trading corporation".

== Subsequent action ==
The parties reached a partial monetary settlement in the defamation action in November 2023.
