= Gayaat Salie-Hlophe =

South African judge

The Honourable Gayaat Salie-Hlophe

Judge of the High Court
- Incumbent
- Assumed office 1 January 2015
- Appointed by: Jacob Zuma
- Division: Western Cape

Personal details
- Born: Gayaat Salie; 13 February 1974 (age 52) Cape Town, South Africa
- Spouse(s): Adrian Samuels (div. 2013) Mauro Nunes Mendes Da Silva (m. 2023)
- Education: Belgravia High School
- Alma mater: University of the Western Cape

Gayaat Salie Da Silva (née Salie; born 13 February 1974), formerly known as Gayaat Salie-Samuels, is a South African judge of the High Court of South Africa. She was appointed to the Western Cape Division in January 2015 after nearly 17 years as a practising attorney in Cape Town. She was an acting judge in the Supreme Court of Appeal in 2022.

== Early life and education ==
Salie Da silva was born on 13 February 1974 in Cape Town. She matriculated in 1991 at the Belgravia High School in Athlone and studied law at the University of the Western Cape, graduating with a BA in 1994 and an LLB in 1996. Between 1994 and 1996, she was employed as an academic tutor in the university's law faculty.

== Legal career ==
Between July 1997 and June 1998, Salie Da Silva served her articles of clerkship at the firm of E. Moosa, Waglay and Petersen Attorneys in Athlone. She was admitted as an attorney of the High Court of South Africa in July 1998. Thereafter she remained at the same firm until she launched her own practice in Wynberg in October 1999. She maintained her practice for the next 15 years, during which time she was an acting judge in the Western Cape Division of the High Court from July 2013 to December 2014.

== Western Cape High Court: 2015–present ==
In October 2014, the Judicial Service Commission shortlisted and interviewed Salie-Hlophe as a candidate for possible permanent appointment to one of two vacancies in the Western Cape High Court. After the interviews, the commission endorsed her candidacy, and on 11 December, President Jacob Zuma confirmed her appointment with effect from 1 January 2015.

Among other matters, Salie-Da Silva presided in the prominent trial of businessman Jason Rohde, whom she convicted of murdering his wife. On appeal, however, the Supreme Court of Appeal reduced the sentence that Salie-Hlophe had handed down for the crime. Rohde applied unsuccessfully to have Salie-Hlophe recuse herself from presiding over his bail hearing during the appeals process.

While serving in the High Court, Salie Da Silva was an acting judge in the Supreme Court of Appeal from April to November 2022.

== Dispute with Patricia Goliath ==
=== Initial complaint ===
On 15 January 2020, the Judicial Service Commission's Judicial Conduct Committee received a gross misconduct complaint against Salie-Hlophe and her husband, John Hlophe, who was the Judge President of the Western Cape Division. The complaint was lodged by Hlophe's deputy, Patricia Goliath, and included serious allegations of nepotism in the division. According to Goliath, Hlophe granted his wife "enormous power" in the court: she was "actively involved in the management of the court, the allocation of matters and, most disturbingly, the appointment of acting judges. Judges complained that she is receiving preferential treatment in terms of her workload. Counsel she worked with or other practitioners with whom she was associated were appointed acting judges." For one example, Goliath said that Hlophe had decided unilaterally to assign the Rohde murder trial to Salie Da Silva rather than to a more senior judge.

In her account, Goliath said that she had been sidelined after an incident in 2017, when Salie-Hlophe asked for her assistance after having been "injured during an altercation" at Hlophe's home. According to Goliath, Salie-Da Silva "disclosed certain information — which I elect not to set out herein... [and] asked me to take her to hospital and explained in graphic detail what had transpired at Hlophe JP's house". Commentators wondered whether this was an oblique reference to a domestic violence incident.

=== Response ===
After the complaint was lodged, Hlophe and Salie Da Silva responded through their lawyer, Barnabas Xulu, who dismissed Goliath's allegations as baseless rumour-mongering. However, a week later, Salie Da Silva published a lengthy and scathing response in which she accused Goliath of lying in order to undermine her and oust Hlophe. On the domestic incident in 2017, Salie Da Silva said that she was "keenly aware that Goliath has an unhealthy obsession with my marriage":

She had expressed to me that I should drop the 'Hlophe' [from] my double-barrel surname and that, should I not choose to exit the marriage, ‘others’ will wonder why I am married to ‘an old black man’. We raise a family together, we have brought our cultures and communities together and we enjoy a union of mutual respect, understanding and intend growing old together. I was shocked that she would encourage me to leave my husband, she would try to make me disillusioned in the marriage and that as his deputy and purported as my friend she could consider this appropriate.

She also implied that Goliath was racist, recounting that, "She would openly and comfortably state that during her life people treated her condescendingly but at least she is not a 'kaffirtjie'". In early February, Hlophe issued his own denial to support Salie-Hlophe's. He said that he had not assaulted Salie-Hlophe in 2017 but that she was "injured by cutting herself against a glass door", and that Goliath had thereafter intruded in their relationship, encouraging Salie-Hlophe to "file charges of a fake assault".

Goliath strongly denied these allegations; indeed, in June 2022, she lodged another complaint, this one directed at Salie-Hlophe alone, taking issue with the allegations that Salie-Hlophe made in her response statement. She also successfully sought permission from the judicial leadership to sue Salie-Hlophe for defamation in respect of those allegations.

=== Conduct findings ===
The Judicial Conduct Committee appointed Nambitha Dambuza, an appellate judge, to investigate Goliath's complaint against Salie-Hlophe. In March 2021, she reported to the committee that there was no evidence of misconduct by Salie-Hlophe, especially since "if it was true that Salie-Hlophe received preferential treatment, her enjoyment thereof could not constitute misconduct on her part". To many of the legal practitioners surprise, Dambuza and the committee also recommended that there should be further investigation of the 2017 domestic incident, this time widened to include the Hlophe couple's allegations of misconduct against Goliath.

That recommendation was reversed in November 2023: while considering unrelated misconduct allegations against Hlophe, the Judicial Conduct Committee said there was no need to investigate Goliath for racism or other misconduct; it also recommended that Hlophe should face an impeachment investigation in respect of the allegations contained in Goliath's original complaint.

== Personal life ==
Salie-Hlophe is Muslim. She has three children, three daughters from her first marriage to Advocate Adrian Samuels, whom she divorced in 2013. In March 2021, in the culmination of a long-running maintenance dispute, the Western Cape High Court convicted Samuels of contempt of court for his failure to settle child maintenance debt owed to Salie-Hlophe under the terms of their divorce; he was sentenced to three months' imprisonment. In the same week, the couple's eldest daughter, then estranged from Salie-Hlophe, told several media publications that she intended to sue her mother for maintenance in order to fund her studies at the University of Cape Town.

Salie-Hlophe remarried to John Hlophe, the Judge President of the Western Cape High Court, in April 2015, but they announced in January 2023 that they had recently divorced amicably. Salie-Hlophe married her third husband, Portuguese businessman Mauro Nunes Mendes Da Silva, on 3 December 2023 in a nikah held at the Casa Labia in Muizenberg. She said that she would retain the name Salie-Hlophe for professional purposes but would also be known as Gayaat Da Silva in personal contexts.
