= Hermanus du Plessis =

South African police colonel (1949 - 2023)

- Born: Hermanus Barend Du Plessis; 29 September 1944; Mossel Bay, Western Cape, South Africa
- Died: May 16, 2023 (aged 78)
- Other name: Boep
- Occupation: Police officer under apartheid South Africa
- Known for: Murder of: Cradock Four; Siphiwe Mthimkhulu; Sizwe Kondile; Pebco Three; Thobekile Madaka
- Conviction: Granted amnesty for crimes against humanity

Hermanus Barend du Plessis (29 September 1944 - 16 May 2023) was a South African policeman, torturer and assassin for the apartheid government.

Du Plessis joined the South African police after matriculation in the 1960s. In the 1980s, he was appointed the provincial commander of a unit of the Security Branch responsible for counterinsurgency in the Eastern Cape province's areas of black people. In 1990, he was appointed as chief investigator of the Harms Commission.

== Roles in assassinating anti-Apartheid activists ==
Du Plessis was the last living suspect with outstanding criminal liability for apartheid-era killings. His death in 2023 effectively closed the door on prosecutions for the Cradock Four case, leaving families without legal closure.

=== Background ===
After Nelson Mandela was elected the first democratic president of South Africa in 1994, his government established the Truth and Reconciliation Commission (TRC) to address crimes relating to human rights violations and the convicted du Plessis appeared before the commission to apply for amnesty.

He confessed being involved in the murders of the Cradock Four, kidnapping and murder of Sizwe Kondile in 1981, kidnapping and murder of Siphiwe Mthimkulu and Thobekile ‘Topsy’ Madaka in 1982; and ordering the abduction and murder of Sipho Charles Hashe, Qaqawuli Godolozi and Champion Galela (the so-called Pebco Three) in May 1985.

In December 1999, the inquiry denied him and five other policemen amnesty for the murders of the Cradock Four and the Pebco Three.

He was granted amnesty for kidnapping and murdering Kondile, Mthimkhulu and Madaka.

In his sworn affidavit at the inquiry, du Plessis stated in part:

I was convinced that as part of the white population group and that the only reason for survival and to guarantee their further existence, is to support the Government of the day. That would only be possible if every population group could exist separately while the white population group would fulfil the dominant rule. During my career in the South African Police I acted at all times in a bona fide manner as a member of the South African Police and as a supporter of the Government of the National Party. I saw my duty to protect the constitutional dispensation of the day and to prevent that the power basis of the National Party should [not] be overthrown.
