= Belinda van Heerden =

South African judge (born 1959)

The Honourable Belinda Jane van Heerden

Judge of the Supreme Court of Appeal
- In office 1 August 2004 – September 2013
- Appointed by: Thabo Mbeki

Judge of the High Court
- In office 1 January 2000 – 31 July 2004
- Appointed by: Thabo Mbeki
- Division: Western Cape

Personal details
- Born: 30 September 1959 (age 67) Ottawa, Canada
- Education: Stellenbosch University; University of Oxford

Belinda Jane van Heerden (born 30 September 1959) is a retired South African judge who served on the Supreme Court of Appeal between 2004 and 2013. Before that, she was a judge of the Western Cape High Court between 2000 and 2004. She also acted on the Constitutional Court in 2006.

Van Heerden began her legal career as an academic with research interests in child law and family law. She worked as a professor of law at the University of Cape Town before she gained appointment to the bench.

== Early life and academic career ==
Van Heerden was born on 30 September 1959 in Ottawa, Canada. She grew up in Somerset West in the Western Cape, where she attended Hottentots High School. Thereafter she attended Stellenbosch University from 1977 to 1981, completing a BA magna cum laude in 1979 and an LLB magna cum laude in 1981. After that, she attended Oxford University on a Rhodes Scholarship, completing a BA in jurisprudence in 1984. She spent the next five years as a lecturer in private law at Stellenbosch University and the University of Cape Town, until in 1989 she returned to Oxford to complete an MA.

In 1992, van Heerden was admitted as an attorney of the Supreme Court of South Africa. After two years' practice in a Cape Town law firm between 1992 and 1994, she rejoined the law faculty of the University of Cape Town in January 1995. She was promoted to associate professor in 1996 and to full professor in 1999. Her academic interests were in child law and family law, especially children's rights and gender equality issues, as well as contract law. Between 1997 and 1999, she was also the project leader of the South African Law Commission committee that reviewed the Child Care Act of 1983.

== Cape High Court: 2000–2004 ==
While still in academia, van Heerden was appointed as an acting judge in the Cape High Court. After a single term in an acting capacity, she joined the bench permanently in January 2000. Notable judgments written by van Heerden in the High Court include those reviewed by the Constitutional Court as Daniels v Campbell and Dawood v Minister of Home Affairs, both of which concerned the institution of marriage.

== Supreme Court of Appeal: 2004–2013 ==
Van Heerden was an acting judge in the Supreme Court of Appeal between 1 June 2003 and 1 August 2004. During that time, in July 2004, the Judicial Service Commission interviewed her as a candidate for permanent appointment to the Supreme Court of Appeal. The only other shortlisted candidate was John Motata, and she was recommended for appointment. President Thabo Mbeki confirmed her appointment later the same month. She was expected to bolster the court's progressive wing. Her notable judgments in the appellate court include Truter v Deysel and Henriques v Giles.

In 2006, van Heerden served a term as an acting judge on the Constitutional Court. Of the 17 judges who acted in the court between 1995 and 2011, she was the only woman. During her time as an acting justice, van Heerden wrote the Constitutional Court's unanimous judgment in Gory v Kolver, which ruled that the Intestate Succession Act of 1987 was unconstitutional to the extent that it did not grant same-sex partners the same rights of intestate succession that it conferred on heterosexual spouses.

When four vacancies emerged at the Constitutional Court in mid-2009, van Heerden was considered to be a frontrunner for permanent appointment to the court. Although she was shortlisted for the position by the Judicial Service Commission, she announced shortly afterwards that she had withdrawn her nomination, without providing her reasons for doing so. She retired from the bench in September 2013.

== Other positions ==
While on the bench, van Heerden was appointed as an honorary professor at the University of Cape Town in 2004, at the University of Stellenbosch in 2007, and at the University of Pretoria and University of the Free State in 2008. She was also the primary South African liaison to the International Hague Network of Judges from 2008 to 2014. She is a member of the International Society of Family Law, the International Association of Youth and Family Judges and Magistrates and the International Association of Women Judges.

== Personal life ==
She is married to William McMurray, who is an electrical engineer. She was a member of the Catholic Women's League.
