= Essa Moosa =

Former Supreme Court judge in South Africa

The Honourable Essa Moosa

Judge of the Western Cape Division of the High Court
- In office 1999–2011

Personal details
- Born: 8 February 1936 Cape Town, South Africa
- Died: 26 February 2017 (aged 81) Crawford, Cape Town, South Africa
- Education: University of Cape Town
- Profession: Attorney

Essa Moosa (8 February 1936 – 26 February 2017) was a judge in the Supreme Court of South Africa. During the apartheid era, he was active as a lawyer defending political detainees, and was a founding member of the anti-apartheid National Association of Democratic Lawyers (Nadel).

== Biography ==
Moosa was born in Cape Town and was educated at Athlone High School where he matriculated in 1954. He obtained a Diploma in Law at the University of Cape Town in 1960, after which he was admitted as an attorney in 1962. His career as a judge started in 1998 when he acted as a judge, first at the Free State Division and then the Western Cape Division. In 1997, he got involved supporting the Kurdish freedom movement and encouraged several politicians of the African National Congress (ANC) to take part in the Musa Anter peace train. He was permanently appointed to the Cape bench on 18 May 1999.

Moosa was actively involved in human rights issues and represented the United Democratic Front and the African National Congress in a number of cases. He was also a member of the ANC Constitutional Committee.

In 2004 he was awarded the Order of the Disa by the Western Cape Province. He died on February 26, 2017.
