= Life imprisonment in South Africa =

Life imprisonment in South Africa has an indeterminate length and may last for the remainder of the offender's life. It is a mandatory punishment for premeditated murder, gang rape, serial rape including rape where the rapist knew they were HIV positive or if the victim was under 16 and/or mentally disabled. In certain circumstances, robberies and hijackings (and aircraft hijacking) also carry a mandatory life sentence.

Section 51 of South Africa's Criminal Law Amendment Act of 1997 prescribes the minimum sentences for other types of murders, rapes and robberies to 25, 15 and 10 years respectively, so parole is almost always granted to prisoners serving life sentences after the minimum sentence for the lesser crime has been served. However, a prisoner must be given a parole hearing after having served 25 years.

New legislation came into effect in 2012 stating that any prisoner who received a life sentence before 2004 can apply for parole, but only after serving at least 13 years and four months of their sentence.

In special cases, life imprisonment without any possibility of parole or pardon for an extensively long period of time (such as 1,000 years) can be imposed, such as in the case of serial killer Moses Sithole.
