= De Lille v Speaker of the National Assembly =

South African legal case

De Lille and Another v Speaker of the National Assembly, an important case in South African constitutional law, was heard in the Cape Provincial Division from April 3 to 7, 1998, with judgment handed down on May 8. It was subsequently confirmed, on appeal, by the Supreme Court of Appeal.

The High Court dealt with the issue of the powers of Parliament and parliamentary privilege, and found that such powers and privilege, to the extent of their inconsistency or incompatibility with the Constitution, are invalid. Where the privilege breaches the provisions of the Constitution, the aggrieved party is entitled to seek redress from the courts, to which is entrusted the task of ensuring the supremacy of the Constitution.

The certificate issued by the Speaker in terms of section 5 of the Powers and Privileges of Parliament Act had the effect of undermining the independence of the courts and interfering with their functioning. Section 5, therefore, was unconstitutional to the extent that it purported to place parliamentary privilege beyond judicial scrutiny, and thus beyond the supreme Constitution, on the mere ipse dixit of the Speaker.

Nor, the court found, does Parliament have the power to act mala fide. The Constitution was not intended to authorise bias on the part of Parliament.

In particular, section 57(1)(a) of the Constitution does not embrace the power to suspend a Member of Parliament as punishment for contempt. Such suspension, the court found, was inconsistent with the requirements of representative democracy, because it penalised not only the Member or her party, but also the electorate which voted for that party. The punishment of suspension, therefore, was unreasonable and unjustifiable in an open and democratic society based on freedom and equality, and accordingly failed the limitations test set in section 36 of the Constitution. In this regard, the court found also that parliamentary privilege does not qualify as a law of general application for the purposes of section 36.

Finally, the High Court noted that section 58(1) of the Constitution, providing for freedom of speech in Parliament, was an absolute freedom, subject only to the rules and orders of the National Assembly, and that it was not a right subject to the limitations clause in section 36.

The Supreme Court of Appeal (SCA) dismissed an appeal against the ruling of the High Court, but on narrower grounds. It noted that no national legislation or Rules or orders of Parliament provided for the suspension of a Member where she was not obstructing or disrupting or unreasonably impeding the management of orderly business within the Assembly, but merely making a non-obstructive and non-disruptive speech. Such a suspension, accordingly, had no constitutional authority, and was therefore void.

== Facts ==
During an interpellation debate in the National Assembly, the first applicant, Patricia de Lille, named inter alia eight senior members of the majority party in the House, the African National Congress, as being accused of having been spies of the previous government. The respondent, the Speaker of the House, intervened and ruled that the reference to spies was unparliamentary. The first applicant unconditionally withdrew the statement she had made. Thereafter, and after having examined Hansard, the respondent found that the first applicant had made two further remarks which she considered to be unparliamentary. The first applicant also withdrew those allegations unconditionally.

Subsequently a motion, proposed by a member of the ANC, was adopted appointing an ad hoc committee to report to the House on the conduct of the first applicant in making serious allegations without substantiation against members of the House and to recommend what action, if any, the House should take in light of its report. Only the ANC supported the motion. The ad hoc committee met under the chairmanship of "D" and was constituted in proportion to the parties' representation in the House, with the ANC having eight members and the opposition parties seven. When the meeting of the committee commenced, the ANC members attempted to exclude the first applicant. The first applicant insisted on being present.

At the first meeting of the committee, "D" had announced that the ANC had a motion which he wanted to put. He then began reading an ANC proposal on the recommendation to be made to the House. An ANC member of the committee intervened to explain that the recommendation was merely being put to the first applicant and was in the nature of a charge rather than a conclusion. "D" refused to disclose the document from which he was reading when called upon to do so and even tore up some of his papers.

Prior to the committee's finalising its task, "C" took over as chairperson, in the absence of "D," who was apparently overseas. "C" had explained that the committee had been set up because he and his comrades had "been actually offended" by the first applicant's statement, and because she had flouted a rule of Parliament.

The first applicant had been formally charged with abusing her privilege of freedom of speech and, secondly, with contravening the Powers and Privileges of Parliament Act, in that she had wilfully failed to obey a National Assembly resolution to the effect that members should not impute improper conduct to others except by way of a separate substantial motion. She was never formally found guilty by the committee of the two charges against her. "C" had commented, when this was drawn to his attention, that "there is not anybody else who has said that [the first applicant] is actually innocent in her conduct."

The committee recommended to the House, inter alia, that she be suspended for fifteen parliamentary working days. These recommendations were adopted by the House.

== Arguments ==
The applicants applied to a Provincial Division for the resolution adopted by the House to be set aside. The first applicant contended that she had not had a fair hearing before the ad hoc committee, in that

1. the ANC members of the committee had tried to exclude her from its deliberations;
2. they had prejudged the issue; and
3. they had never seriously attempted to enquire into her conduct.

Accordingly there was actual bias, or, alternatively, a reasonable suspicion of bias, on the part of the ANC members of the ad hoc committee. She further averred that she had not understood the previous resolution of the House to be anything more than a ruling in a particular matter and did not understand it to create a new rule or convention in the House.

It was argued on behalf of the respondent that the ad hoc committee merely made recommendations to the National Assembly, which took the ultimate decision. Therefore it was not necessary for the committee to give the first respondent a hearing. The respondent further argued that the National Assembly was merely exercising its privilege when it passed the resolution; accordingly, it was not open to the Courts to enquire into or pronounce upon the exercise of any such privilege. In the alternative, it was argued that judicial review in such cases was limited to caprice or mala fides.

The respondent, in exercising her powers in terms of the Powers and Privileges of Parliament Act, issued a certificate stating that the present application concerned the privilege of the National Assembly and that the matter should be permanently stayed.

== High Court ==
The court held that the ad hoc committee's investigation and subsequent recommendations had led to a decision seriously affecting individual rights and interests. The committee could never have been sure that it was properly acquainted with all of the considerations relevant to its recommendations unless it had properly heard the views of everyone involved. The first applicant had not been given a hearing at all in the National Assembly, whereas the purported hearing before the ad hoc committee had violated the common-law rules of natural justice. De Lille had been entitled to be heard fairly by an unbiased committee and had been entitled to make representations regarding the proposed sanction against her. The common-law rules of natural justice applied unless the relevant statute had expressly or by necessary implication excluded them. These rules required that, when a statute empowered a public official or body to give a decision prejudicially affecting an individual's rights or interests or legitimate expectations, such an individual must be heard before the decision is taken or any serious recommendations prejudicially affecting such rights, interests or legitimate expectations are made by the body concerned.

There had also, the court found, been a breach of the nemo iudex in sua causa rule, which required that an affected party be heard by an impartial and unbiased tribunal. At no stage was the first applicant given a real and meaningful hearing. The ANC had been the complainant, and then the prosecutor and ultimately the judge in its own cause. This had violated the rules of natural justice. In the circumstances of the case the inference that the ad hoc committee was in fact biased was irresistible. The court held, further, that the ad hoc committee had acted mala fide, and that no-one had the power to act mala fide, Parliament included. The Constitution also did not intend to authorise bias.

The committee had never enquired into the wilfulness of the first applicant's conduct and, on the information before it, could not have concluded that she had deliberately disobeyed a rule or order or resolution which was to her knowledge binding upon her. Accordingly she could not have been guilty of any "wilful" disobedience. The Constitution is the supreme law of the Republic, and any law or conduct inconsistent with it is invalid. The Constitution also provides that the Bill of Rights applies to all law and binds the Legislature, the Executive, the Judiciary and all organs of State. Thus, the court held, any privilege inconsistent or incompatible with the Constitution is invalid. The extent of privilege is inextricably bound with the exercise thereof. The determination of the extent of privilege must relate to its exercise; otherwise, the court noted, Parliament would have a blank cheque to set the limits of its own powers.

On a proper interpretation of the Constitution, the power to determine and control the National Assembly's internal arrangements did not embrace the power to suspend a Member as punishment for contempt. The powers under section 57(1)(a) of the Constitution were meant to facilitate the proper exercise of powers and functions of the Assembly which the Constitution intended. Had Parliament intended otherwise, the Constitution would say so in as many words, particularly, the court held, because the principles of representative democracy lay at the heart of the Constitution. The suspension of a Member of the Assembly from Parliament for contempt was not consistent with the requirements of representative democracy. It would be a punishment calculated to have penalised not only the Member for contempt, but also his or her party and those of the electorate who voted for that party and who are entitled to be represented in the Assembly by their proportional number of representatives.

The Powers and Privileges of Parliament Act dealt with penalties for contempt, but it did not mention suspension from the National Assembly as one of them. Furthermore, Rule 85 of the Standing Rules of Parliament clearly did not envisage punitive suspension. It dealt with protective suspension, which may have been necessary in the event of a Member disrupting proceedings in Parliament. In casu this was clearly not the case. The first respondent had already withdrawn the offending statements she had made in Parliament. Therefore, the court determined, her suspension was punitive, not protective. The nature and exercise of Parliamentary privilege has to be consonant with the Constitution. The exercise of Parliamentary privilege, clearly a Constitutional power, is not immune from judicial review. If a Parliamentary privilege is exercised in breach of Constitutional Provisions, redress may be sought by an aggrieved party from the courts whose primary function is to protect the rights of individuals.

The court held, further, that the supremacy of the Constitution is recognised and vouchsafed, not only in the Constitution itself, but also by the pronouncements of the Constitutional Court in the interpretation and protection and enforcement of the Constitution, with particular reference to the Bill of Rights. The task of ensuring that the supremacy of the Constitution is recognised and enforced by all to whom it applies, including organs of state, such as Parliament, has been entrusted to the courts. This, the court stressed, is not an interference with the independence of Parliament and its right to control its own procedures and the discipline its members. The court did not seek to dictate to Parliament; it could not have done so. It recognised the separation of powers and its desirability, as well as that the proper exercise of parliamentary privilege was a matter for Parliament alone. Where, however, the court can and must interfere is where Parliament has improperly exercised that privilege and acted mala fide or capriciously and in defiance of the constitutionally inherent rights of a Member, such as the right to just administrative action.

The National Assembly had imposed a sentence of fifteen days' suspension without any prospect of the discharge contemplated in the rules of Parliament. The punishment imposed on the first applicant was for statements she had made in the Assembly in the exercise of her freedom of speech, protected by the Constitution. The punishment of suspension was not authorised by the rules of Parliament. The freedom of speech conferred by section 58(1) of the Constitution is an absolute freedom in the sense that it is subject only to the rules and orders of the Assembly. It is not subject to the limitations clause of the Constitution. Accordingly, the first applicant's suspension was unconstitutional and in violation of her freedom of speech.

To the extent that Rule 49(3) of the Standing Rules of Parliament excluded matters of privilege from the jurisdiction of the disciplinary committee of Parliament, it was incumbent on the National Assembly to create a disciplinary mechanism which was consonant with the Constitution. The ad hoc committee was not and could not have been an independent and impartial forum for the purposes of section 34 of the Constitution because, unlike the disciplinary committee envisaged in the rules of Parliament, it was dominated by the majority party. Its independence and impartiality was significantly compromised. The court held that the exercise of Parliamentary privilege which resulted in the suspension of the first applicant had clearly affected her constitutional rights.

The law of parliamentary privilege, according to the court, did not qualify as a law of general application for the purposes of section 36 of the Constitution:

It is not codified or capable of ascertainment. Nor is it based on a clear system of precedent. Therefore there is no guarantee of parity of treatment. It is essentially ad hoc jurisprudence which applies unequally to different parties.

Accordingly the law of parliamentary privilege failed the "law of general application" leg of the limitations test in section 36 of the Constitution. The punishment of suspension also failed the second leg of the limitations test. It was found not to be reasonable and justifiable in an open democratic society based on freedom and equality. The purpose served by an ex post facto punitive suspension for unparliamentary remarks about members which had already been withdrawn was not altogether clear. It was not designed to protect the proceedings of the Assembly from disruption, because it took place at a time when there was no threat of disruption, particularly after an unconditional withdrawal of the offending allegations by the first applicant. The court held that it could never be reasonable and justifiable in an open and democratic society, based on human dignity and equality and freedom, for such punitive power to be exercised in violation of the rules of natural justice:

It can never be reasonably justifiable in a democratic society to impose such suspension which will deprive innocent members of the electorate of their representation in Parliament when any such punitive purpose served by the suspension could equally be served by other punishments which do not compromise democratic representation.

Section 57(1)(a) of the Constitution permits the Assembly to determine and control its internal arrangements and proceedings and procedures. It does not, however, follow that the Assembly may do so in a manner inconsistent with the Constitution. The exercise of power conferred on the Assembly by section 57(1)(a) remains subject to the Constitution and subject to constitutional review by the Courts. Therefore, the court found, the contention that the mere issue of a certificate obliged the Court to stay proceedings, which should thereupon be deemed to be finalised, was untenable. To the extent that section 5 of the Powers and Privileges of Parliament Act purported to place issues of Parliamentary privilege beyond judicial scrutiny and thus beyond the supremacy of the Constitution on the mere ipse dixit of the Speaker, it was undoubtedly unconstitutional.

The court held section 5 of the Powers and Privileges of Parliament Act to be inconsistent with section 1(c) of the Constitution and the rule of law as founding values of the South African legal order. The rule of law does not countenance the administrative issue of a certificate to shield illegal and unconstitutional acts from judicial review. The section was also at variance with section 2 of the Constitution, which provides that law or conduct inconsistent with the Constitution is invalid. There were also many other provisions of the Constitution, the court found, which section 5 violated. Any certificate issued under section 5 undermined the independence of the courts and interfered with their functioning.

The court ruled, accordingly, that section 5 of the Act was unconstitutional and invalid, and that no certificate issued under its purported authority was of any effect. The resolution passed by the National Assembly purporting to suspend the first applicant for fifteen days was set aside.

== Supreme Court of Appeal ==
On appeal, the decision of the Cape High Court was confirmed on the narrower ground that there was no legal authority permitting the Assembly to punish a member for making a speech by suspending that member from the proceedings of the Assembly. The court noted that section 58(1) expressly guarantees freedom of speech in the National Assembly (subject to its Rules and orders). "It is," the court held, "a crucial guarantee." The threat that a Member of the Assembly may be suspended for something said in the assembly inhibited freedom of expression in the Assembly, and "must therefore adversely impact on that guarantee."

"It is clear," the court found,

that the respondent was not suspended because her behaviour was obstructing or disrupting or unreasonably impeding the management of orderly business within the Assembly, but as some kind of punishment for making a speech in the Assembly some days earlier which did not obstruct or disrupt the proceedings in the Assembly at the time.

"In the result," continued Mahomed CJ, "the appellant has failed to persuade me that the National Assembly had any constitutional authority to suspend the respondent from the National Assembly in the circumstances disclosed by the evidence adduced before the High Court." Accordingly, the suspension of a Member of the Assembly in those circumstances did not have constitutional authority and was void.

== See also ==
- National Assembly of South Africa
- Parliament of South Africa
- Patricia de Lille
