= Sizwe Kondile =

South African anti-apartheid activist (1957 - 1981)

- Born: Gcinisizwe Sylvester Khwezi Kondile; October 6, 1957; Port Elizabeth, Eastern Cape, South Africa
- Died: August 10, 1981 (aged 23); Komatipoort, Eastern Transvaal, South Africa
- Cause of death: Tortured, shot dead and then burnt to ashes by Apartheid police
- Resting place: Spiritually repatriated to Zwide Cemetery, Ibhayi, Eastern Cape in 2016
- Other name: Tshonyi
- Education: Bachelor of Laws
- Alma mater: Fort Hare University
- Occupation: Freedom fighter
- Organization: uMkhonto we Sizwe
- Political party: Congress of South African Students (Cosas), African National Congress (ANC)
- Children: Bantu Kondile
- Parents: Dumile Kondile (father); Charity Kondile (mother)
- Awards: Order of Mendi for Bravery (2021)

Gcinisizwe Sylvester Khwezi Kondile (6 October 1957 - 10 August 1981) was a South African anti-apartheid activist and a member of uMkhonto we Sizwe.

== Early life and political activism ==
He was born Gcinisizwe Sylvester Khwezi Kondile on 6 October 1957. His father, Dumile Kondile, who died at the age of 90 in February 2023, was a prominent lawyer, magistrate in Port Elizabeth, Eastern Cape and was later appointed as a judge for the Pietermaritzburg High Court, KwaZulu Natal (KZN).

The young Kondile matriculated in KZN, at the Amanzimtoti High School and his childhood friend was Vusi Pikoli, whom with he went to initiation school. The parents of Pikoli and Kondile's were friends and went to the same church. In his 2021 memoir, Pikoli speaks about how as kids Kondile always wished to work for the Ford Motor Company's assembly plant in Port Elizabeth and would joke also that he wanted to be president of South Africa.

While students at the Fort Hare University, Kondile and Pikoli were detained for planning a memorial lecture for Steve Biko, a murdered prominent anti-apartheid activist and intellectual, and soon after their release fled South Africa to Lesotho with two others - Phaki Ximiya and Thozi Majola - where they joined the African National Congress (ANC) and militarily trained with uMkhonto we Sizwe (MK) in the 1980s.

In Lesotho, Kondile was mentored by Chris Hani, a popular MK leader, and was considered Hani's confidante. Hani trusted Kondile with his personal belongings, such as allowing him to use his yellow Datsun Stanza SSS car frequently.

Other notable people that Kondile was exiled with in Lesotho include Tito Mboweni and Ngoako Ramatlhodi.

== Capture ==
On 26 June 1981, Kondile used Chris Hani's Datsun Stanza SSS to go phone his girlfriend. When he battled to find a telephone booth in Maseru, he drove to Van Rooyen Border Gate to try make a call and was arrested by a team of Security Branch led by Colonel Hermanus du Plessis and Hani's car was also taken by the police.

He was initially detained in Bloemfontein, Free State province and then on 10 July 1981 he was transported to Humansdorp police station in the Eastern Cape where he was subjected to torture while being interrogated for two weeks. On 24 July 1981, Kondile was moved to the Jeffrey's Bay police station where the torture continued - plastic bags placed on his face to suffocate him and also tortured with an electrical machine.

== Death ==
Testifying at the Truth and Reconciliation Commission for his amnesty application, Colonel Hermanus du Plessis, the man who led a team of policemen that arrested Kondile on 26 June 1981, said after being tortured Kondile sounded like someone who was agreeing to work with the police and become an askari against the ANC and MK, especially help the police capture their most wanted enemy, Chris Hani, whom Kondile was considered a confidante. Later Kondile backtracked on the agreement to sell out his ANC comrades after Du Plessis had given him names of other ANC comrades who were police informers in Lesotho. A decision on 10 August 1981 was taken to kill him to protect the identity of those informers, according to Du Plessis.

He was murdered in Komatipoort by Du Pless, Dirk Coetzee and three other policemen.

The police dumped Hani's car near Barberton and proceeded with Kondile to the bushes in Komatipoort on that night of 10 August 1981 where Sergeant Roy Otto took out his service pistol and shot Kondile dead. His body was then put on wood and burnt the whole night into ashes. His ashes and remains were thrown into the Komati River, making it difficult to be recover and led to him being spiritually repatriated in 2016

His disappearance remained a mystery to his family in Port Elizabeth and comrades in Lesotho until nine years later when the New Nation newspaper broke the story on 9 February 1990 about a "youth" who was shot dead and burnt. Afterwards Coetzee confessed to his murder and exposed the Security Branch as being behind it
