= Jeanette Traverso =

South African judge

The Honourable Jeanette Traverso

Deputy Judge President of the Western Cape High Court
- In office 2001–2016
- Preceded by: John Hlophe
- Succeeded by: Patricia Goliath

Judge of the High Court of South Africa
- In office 1994–2000

Personal details
- Born: Jeanette Helena Margaretha Coetzee; 28 May 1946 (age 80) Johannesburg, South Africa
- Education: University of Stellenbosch

Jeanette Helena Margaretha Traverso (née Coetzee; born 28 May 1946) is a former judge of the High Court of South Africa. She is the second female appointed as a judge in South Africa and the first woman to be appointed as a Deputy Judge President of a Division of the High Court of South Africa.

== Early life and education ==
Traverso is the daughter of Barzillai (Blaar) Coetzee and Jacoba Rossouw (Twinkle) Coetzee (née Hanekom). Her father was a businessman, politician, the minister of Public Works and Community Development in the late 1960s and the South African Ambassador to Rome. Her mother, who was an actress, died shortly before Traverso's thirteenth birthday. Traverso matriculated in 1963 at Afrikaanse Hoër Meisieskool in Pretoria, whereafter she enrolled at the University of Stellenbosch, obtaining a BA degree in 1966 and a LLB in 1968.

== Career ==
Traverso was admitted as an advocate on 4 June 1969 and worked as a prosecutor in the Magistrate's Court for six months, after which she went to the Attorney - General's office until 1972. After spending a few years raising a family, she was admitted to the Cape Bar in 1975. She was however not the first woman to be admitted to the Cape Bar. (That honour goes to Cissy Gool who was admitted to the Cape Bar in 1967). 8 May 1991 she became a Senior counsel. After serving as an acting judge in 1993, she was permanently appointed to the bench of the Western Cape High Court in early 1994, making her only the second woman to serve as a judge in South Africa.

In February 2001, Judge Traverso was appointed the Deputy Judge President of the Western Cape High Court, the first woman to hold the position at a High Court in South Africa. During 2014, she was the presiding judge in the trial of Shrien Dewani for the murder of his wife, Anni Dewani.

== Other interests ==
Traverso was a keen runner and completed the Comrades Marathon a number of times.
