= Criminal Law Amendment Act, 1997 =

Parliament of South Africa
- Long title: Act to make provision for the setting aside of all sentences of death in accordance with law and their substitution by lawful punishments; to amend certain laws so as to repeal provisions relating to capital punishment; to provide for minimum sentences for certain serious offences; and to provide for matters connected therewith.
- Citation: Act No. 105 of 1997
- Territorial extent: Republic of South Africa
- Enacted by: Parliament of South Africa
- Assented to: 27 November 1997
- Commenced: 13 November 1998 (§1–50); 1 May 1998 (§51–53)

Legislative history
- Bill title: Criminal Law Amendment Bill
- Bill citation: B46—1997
- Introduced by: Dullah Omar, Minister of Justice

Summary
- Establishes procedure for replacing death sentences with other sentences; repeals provisions related to capital punishment; sets minimum sentences for certain offences.

Keywords
- capital punishment, mandatory sentencing
- Status: In force

The Criminal Law Amendment Act, 1997 (Act No. 105 of 1997) is an act of the Parliament of South Africa which dealt with the consequences of the Constitutional Court's ruling in S v Makwanyane in which capital punishment was declared to be unconstitutional. The act repealed the laws allowing for the death penalty and amended various other laws referring to death sentences or capital offences. It also established a procedure by which existing death sentences could be converted to prison sentences, and fixed minimum sentences for certain serious crimes. The act came into force on 13 November 1998, except for the minimum sentencing provisions, which came into force on 1 May 1998.

== Background ==
The Interim Constitution of South Africa, which came into force on 27 April 1994, created for the first time in South Africa a justiciable bill of rights; section nine of that bill of rights stated that, "Every person shall have the right to life." The Constitutional Court was also created by the Interim Constitution; the first case on which it heard argument was S v Makwanyane and Another, a test case to determine the constitutionality of the death penalty. On 6 June 1995 the court handed down its judgment, ruling that the death penalty violated the right to life, the right to dignity, and the protection against cruel and inhuman punishment. The judgment invalidated the provisions in the Criminal Procedure Act that allowed for capital punishment, and any similar provision in any other law in force. The court also ruled that prisoners already sentenced to death could not be executed, and that they should remain in prison until their sentences were set aside and replaced according to law.

== Provisions ==
=== Replacement of sentences ===
Section 1 of the act established the procedure for replacing death sentences. For people sentenced to death and whose appeals were exhausted, the Minister of Justice was required to refer each case back to the court which had imposed the death sentence, to be heard by the judge who had imposed the sentence, if possible, or by another judge of that court. The judge would then receive written argument from the prosecuting authority and from the convict, and determine an appropriate sentence. The President would then exercise the power of commutation to set aside the death sentence and replace it by the sentence determined by the court. In cases where an appeal to the Supreme Court of Appeal was pending, and that appeal was against the sentence only, the case was to be referred back to the original court for a new sentence to be imposed. In cases where an appeal against the conviction was pending, the Supreme Court of Appeal was required to impose a new sentence when it ruled on the appeal.

=== Repeal of laws ===
The act repealed sections 276(1)(a), 277, 278 and 279 of the Criminal Procedure Act (CPA), which made the death sentence a valid sentence for certain offences and established the procedure for carrying it out. It also amended other sections of the CPA and various other acts which referred to the death sentence or to capital offences. It made similar amendments to the Defence Act to abolish capital punishment in the military justice system. A schedule to the act contained similar amendments to laws of the formerly independent bantustans, which remained in force for their territories.

=== Minimum sentences ===
Sections 51 to 53 of the act provided for certain minimum sentences to be required for certain serious crimes. These mandatory sentencing provisions were initially to have effect only for two years, subject to extension by Presidential proclamation. Such extensions were repeatedly made to keep the provisions in force until 2007, when the Criminal Law (Sentencing) Amendment Act, 2007 made them permanent. The act prescribes life imprisonment for certain convictions of murder or rape; subsequent amendments added certain terrorism-related crimes, genocide and crimes against humanity under the Rome Statute of the International Criminal Court, and human trafficking. Various lesser minimum sentences are prescribed for other crimes, including 15 years for a first conviction of murder, 20 years for a second conviction, and 25 years for any third or subsequent conviction.

== See also ==
- Life imprisonment in South Africa
