= Impeachment in South Africa =

Legislative charges against a public official

Impeachment in South Africa is the process by which the legislative body of the Republic of South Africa addresses legal charges against a government official.

== Union and republic ==
When the Union of South Africa was established in 1910, the only officials who could be impeached (though the term itself was not used) were the chief justice and judges of the Supreme Court of South Africa. The scope was broadened when the country became a republic in 1961, to include the state president. It was further broadened in 1981 to include the new office of vice state president; and in 1994 to include the executive deputy presidents, provincial premiers, the Public Protector and the Auditor-General. Since 1997, members of certain commissions established by the Constitution can also be impeached. The grounds for impeachment, and the procedures to be followed, have changed several times over the years.

Impeachment proceedings were first invoked in the 2010s :

- An attempt was made in April 2016 to impeach president Jacob Zuma for violating the Constitution, but his party, which had the majority in the National Assembly, voted against it.
- An attempt was made in December 2022 to impeach president Cyril Ramaphosa for misconduct, but here too his party, which still had the majority in the National Assembly, voted against it.
- Public Protector Busisiwe Mkhwebane was impeached and dismissed for misconduct and incompetence in September 2023, making her the first public office-bearer in the country's history to be removed from office by this process.
- Proceedings against Judge President John Hlophe of Western Cape Court was equally instituted by Parliament. This resulted in him being the first judge to be impeached and removed from office.

=== Chief Justice and Judges ===
1910-1994 : the governor-general-in-council (until 1961) or state president (from 1961) could remove a judge from office for "misbehaviour or incapacity" if both the Senate and the House of Assembly submitted addresses to him, during the same session of parliament, asking him to do so.

1994-1997 : the president could remove a judge from office for "misbehaviour, incapacity or incompetence", if both the National Assembly and the Senate requested him to do so, after considering a report from the Judicial Service Commission.

1997-date : the president may remove a judge from office if (a) the Judicial Service Commission finds that the judge "suffers from an incapacity, is grossly incompetent or is guilty of gross misconduct", and (b) the National Assembly resolves, by a two-thirds majority, that the judge be removed. In 2022, two High Court judges, retired Judge Nkola Motata and Judge President John Hlophe of the Western Cape division, Cape Town were recommended for removal by the National Assembly by its Portfolio Committee on Justice and Correctional Services.

=== State President / President ===
1961-1980 : the Senate and House of Assembly could remove the State President from office for "misconduct or inability to perform efficiently the duties of his office". The procedure required (a) at least thirty members of the House to petition the Speaker to appoint a joint committee; (b) the House to resolve to appoint the committee; (c) the Senate to concur with the resolution, (d) the committee to submit a report; and (e) each House to resolve, in the same session of parliament, to remove the State President from office.

1981-1984 : following the abolition of the Senate, the power to impeach the State President was vested in the House of Assembly alone. The same procedure applied to the removal of the Vice State President.

1984-1994 : an electoral college, consisting of delegates from the House of Assembly and the new House of Representatives and House of Delegates, could remove the State President from office for "misconduct or inability to perform efficiently the duties of his office". The procedure required (a) at least half the members of each of the three houses to petition the Speaker of Parliament to appoint a committee; (b) each house to resolve to appoint the committee; (c) the committee to submit a report; and (d) the electoral college to resolve to adopt the report and declare the State President removed from office.

1994-1997 : the National Assembly and the Senate, sitting jointly, could remove the President from office by impeaching him or her for "a serious violation of this Constitution or the other laws of the Republic, or of misconduct or inability rendering him or her unfit to exercise and perform his or her powers and functions". A two-thirds majority was required. A similar procedure applied to the removal of any of the Executive Deputy Presidents.

1997-date : the National Assembly (alone) may remove the President, for "a serious violation of the Constitution or the law", "serious misconduct" or "inability to perform the functions of office". A two-thirds majority is required. A president who is removed may not receive any benefits of that office, and may not serve in any public office.

President Jacob Zuma came close to facing an impeachment vote in 2016 over the abuse of taxpayer funds to build his personal home at Nkandla, but his party used their parliamentary majority to prevent the vote. The Constitutional Court subsequently found that parliament had failed to hold Zuma to account and ordered parliament to establish rules for the impeachment process.

In August 2022 opposition parties initiated a preliminary section 89 inquiry, which concluded that Cyril Ramaphosa had a case to answer by November 2022. This was after former intelligence officer Arthur Fraiser laid a criminal charge against Ramaphosa for covering up and unlawful handling of the Phalaphala burglary. In August 2026 Ramaphosa was accused by opposition parties of delaying the processes after he indicated in writing that he was not happy with the appointed evidence leader.

=== Premiers of provinces ===
1994-1997: a provincial legislature could remove the province's premier from office by impeaching him or her for "a serious violation of this Constitution or the other laws of the Republic or the province", or for misconduct or inability rendering him or her unfit to exercise and perform his or her powers and functions. A two-thirds majority was required.

1997-date: a provincial legislature may remove the province's premier from office for "a serious violation of the Constitution or the law", "serious misconduct" or "inability to perform the functions of office". A two-thirds majority is required. A premier who is removed may not receive any benefits of that office, and may not serve in any public office.

=== Public Protector ===
1994-1997: the president could remove the Public Protector from office for "misbehaviour, incapacity or incompetence", if both the Assembly and the Senate requested him to do so, after considering a report from a joint committee.

1997-date: the president must remove the public protector if a committee of the National Assembly finds him or her guilty of "misconduct, incapacity or incompetence", and the Assembly resolves that he or she be removed. A two-thirds majority is required. In 2023, Public Protector Busisiwe Mkhwebane became the first head of a Chapter 9 institution to be impeached.

=== Auditor-General ===
1994-1997: the procedure was the same as that for removing the Public Protector.

1997-date: the procedure is the same as that for removing the Public Protector.

=== Members of Commissions ===
1997-date: the president must remove a member of the South African Human Rights Commission, the Commission for the Promotion and Protection of the Rights of Cultural, Religious and Linguistic Communities, the Commission for Gender Equality or the Electoral Commission from office if a committee of the National Assembly finds him or her guilty of "misconduct, incapacity or incompetence", and the Assembly resolves that he or she be removed. A simple majority is required.

== Pre-Union states ==
=== Orange Free State ===
The Constitution of the Orange Free State republic provided that the Volksraad (legislature) could impeach the state president and other public officers for "treason, bribery, and other high misdemeanours." A three-quarters majority vote was required. The Volksraad's sanction was limited to dismissing the incumbent from office and declaring him unfit to hold any office under the government, but the dismissed president or official remained liable to be prosecuted according to law.

=== South African Republic ===
The Constitution of the South African Republic provided that the Volksraad could discharge or dismiss the president from office on conviction for misconduct, embezzlement of state property, treason or other serious crimes. He was liable to be prosecuted for such offences.
