= Louis Harms (judge) =

South African judge (born 1941)

The Honourable Louis Harms

Deputy President of the Supreme Court of Appeal of South Africa
- In office 2008–2011
- Preceded by: Lex Mpati
- Succeeded by: Kenneth Mthiyane

Judge of the Supreme Court of Appeal of South Africa
- In office 1993–2008

Judge of the Transvaal Provincial Division of the Supreme Court of South Africa
- In office 1986–1993

Personal details
- Born: Louis Theodor Christian Harms; 11 October 1941 (age 84)
- Spouse: Advocate Irene Harms (daughter of former Chief Justice Frans Rumpff)
- Children: 3
- Education: University of Pretoria
- Profession: Advocate

Louis Theodor Christian Harms (born 11 October 1941) is a South African judge who served as deputy president of the Supreme Court of Appeal and Professor Extraordinary for Intellectual Property Law at the University of Pretoria.

== Education ==
Harms graduated from the University of Pretoria with a BA LL.B. (cum laude) in 1965 and the Hugo Grotius medal for best final year student. He was awarded a LLD (hon causa) from the University of the Free State and the University of Pretoria in 2013.

== Biography ==
An advocate at the Pretoria Bar from 1966 to 1986, Harms was awarded senior advocate status in 1981 and appointed as a judge in 1986. He served as a Judge of Appeal in the Supreme Court of Appeal from 1993 to his appointment as Deputy President of the Supreme Court of Appeal in 2008, a position he held until his retirement in 2011. He is infamous as the author of the Harms Report. Asked by President F.W.DeKlerk to investigate the State controlled death squads and political murders he set up what is known as the Harms Commission of Inquiry (Feb-Sept 1990). Suspected collusion with the apartheid state was implied after the release of the final report which denied the existence of death squads contradicted later by the mountains of evidence to the contrary uncovered by the Truth and Reconciliation Commission (TRC). The records at WITS University concluded: "The Harms Commission report, which was released in September 1990, failed to name any special units of the army or police, let alone any individual officers, as participants in the death squads. The report was denounced by opposition groups as a whitewash.

He is the author of three legal books, including The Enforcement of Intellectual Property Rights: A Case Book, which has been translated into Arabic, Chinese and Russian.

== Memberships and service ==
Harms served as vice chairman of the Council of the University of Pretoria from 1994 to 1996. Among his other Board roles was serving as a board member on the University of Western Australia Law Journal and for the Intellectual Property Journal, Osgood Hall Law School in Toronto. Harms was project leader on six criminal procedure issues from 1999 to 2003, and the chairman and sole member of four judicial commissions of inquiry in South Africa (1988 to 1990) – three dealing with corruption and related matters, and the other with political murders and other violent acts.

Harms is an Honorary Fellow of the Arbitration Foundation of Southern Africa, the Arbitration Association (Southern Africa), an Honorary Bencher of the Middle Temple, UK and also a member of the 4-5 Gray's Inn Square barristers' chambers in London.
