= Glenn Goosen (judge) =

South African judge

The Honourable Glenn Goosen

Judge of the Supreme Court of Appeal
- Incumbent
- Assumed office 1 December 2022
- Appointed by: Cyril Ramaphosa

Judge of the High Court
- In office 1 January 2012 – 30 November 2022
- Appointed by: Jacob Zuma
- Division: Eastern Cape

Personal details
- Born: Glenn Graham Goosen; 12 April 1962 (age 64) Port Elizabeth, South Africa
- Education: University of Cape Town

Glenn Graham Goosen (born 12 April 1962) is a South African judge of the Supreme Court of Appeal. He was formerly a judge of the Eastern Cape High Court from January 2012 until December 2022, when he was appointed to the Supreme Court of Appeal.

Before joining the bench, Goosen practised as an advocate in Port Elizabeth, gaining silk status in 2004. He was also a prominent student activist in the anti-apartheid movement and served briefly as director of investigations for the Truth and Reconciliation Commission.

== Early life and education ==
Goosen was born on 12 April 1962 in Port Elizabeth (later renamed Gqeberha) in the Eastern Cape. He matriculated at St Patrick's Marist Brothers College in Port Elizabeth and went on to the University of Cape Town (UCT), where he completed a BA in 1984 and an LLB in 1988. He was a researcher at UCT's Centre for African Studies in 1987.

While at UCT, he became involved in the student anti-apartheid movement, gaining election as the president of the UCT student representative council in 1985 and serving on the national executive of the National Union of South African Students. He also joined the End Conscription Campaign in 1986.

== Legal practice ==
In 1989, Goosen served his articles of clerkship at Brereton & Co, a firm focused on human rights law and public interest law. The head of the firm, Vanessa Brereton, later confessed to having spied on anti-apartheid activists, including Goosen, on behalf of the South African Police. At the time, Goosen remained active in the anti-apartheid movement, sitting on the executive of the United Democratic Front from 1989 and becoming active in the African National Congress when it was unbanned by the apartheid government in 1990.

Goosen was admitted as an advocate in 1990 and he practised at the Port Elizabeth Bar for the next two decades. During that time, he took a brief hiatus from practice between 1996 and 1997 while he served as national director of the investigations unit of the post-apartheid Truth and Reconciliation Commission (TRC). He had originally interviewed, unsuccessfully, for the more junior post of national legal officer for the TRC, which was ultimately filled by Hanif Vally. He resigned from the TRC in 1997 amid rumours of "personal differences" between him and TRC commissioner Dumisa Ntsebeza.

Upon returning to the bar in 1998, Goosen became active in the governance and mentorship programmes of the Port Elizabeth Bar, Eastern Cape Bar, and General Council of the Bar. He was awarded silk status in 2004, and he served as an acting judge on several occasions between 2005 and 2011, sitting in the Eastern Cape Division of the High Court of South Africa. In April 2010, he was one of nine candidates shortlisted and interviewed for permanent appointment to one of five vacancies in the Eastern Cape High Court. However, during Goosen's interview, Dumisa Ntsebeza – who by then was a member of the Judicial Service Commission – repeatedly pointed to the existing preponderance of white males in the court, and the Judicial Service Commission did not recommend Goosen for appointment.

== Eastern Cape High Court: 2011–2022 ==
In October 2011, the Judicial Service Commission interviewed Goosen for a new vacancy in the Eastern Cape High Court, and on that occasion it recommended him for appointment. President Jacob Zuma confirmed his appointment with effect from 1 January 2012. In the High Court, his best-known judgement was Madzodzo v Minister of Basic Education, sometimes known as "the furniture case", which was handed down in February 2014 and which concerned the content of the right to basic education as enshrined in Section 29(1) of the Constitution. Goosen ruled that the Department of Basic Education had violated the right to basic education by failing to provide furniture to rural schools in the former Transkei. He agreed with the Legal Resources Centre that the right to education required the provision of "a range of educational resources", including school furniture, and that the government's budgetary constraints did not nullify learners' entitlement to effective relief.

Goosen later served lengthy stints as an acting judge in the Supreme Court of Appeal, first for a year between June 2020 and May 2021 and then for one term between June and September 2022. In addition to dissenting judgements, he wrote the court's majority judgements in Martrade Shipping v United Enterprises, a shipping law matter, and in National Union of Metalworkers v Dunlop, in which the court ruled in favour of the National Union of Metalworkers in finding that the Labour Relations Act protected unions from civil liability for damages incurred in the course of industrial action.

In the fall of 2019, Goosen was selected to receive mediator training in the U.S. as part of South Africa's efforts to improve mediation opportunities via court-annexed processes. His cohort of judges included Audrey Ledwaba, Thoba Poyo-Dlwati, Nolwazi Mabindla-Boqwana, Raylene Keightley, Norman Davis, and Phineas Mojapelo (ret.). He and his U.S. trained judge colleagues were involved in the leadership of a national summit and mediation training for S.A. judges in Cape Town in July 2022. Court-annexed mediation was the focus of the meetings. The South African Judicial Education Institute (SAJEI) and several additional judges were prominent in that effort, including former Chief Justice Raymond Zondo and Francis Legodi (ret.), as well as faculty members and mediators from the U.S.--Judge Ben H. Hadfield (ret.), Nathan D. Alder, Velvet Rodriquez, and Stephen D. Kelson. C.J. Zondo expressed full support of court-based mediation stating that he would "like it to take off as soon as possible."

== Supreme Court of Appeal: 2022–present ==
In October 2022, Goosen was one of 11 candidates interviewed by the Judicial Service Commission for possible appointment to one of five permanent vacancies at the Supreme Court of Appeal. Although the National Association of Democratic Lawyers suggested that his elevation would result in an "over-representation of white men" on the Supreme Court, the Eastern Cape branch of Lawyers for Transformation pointed to his "impeccable credentials" in the anti-apartheid movement, as did former Supreme Court President Lex Mpati, who supported his nomination. In addition, both Deputy Chief Justice Mandisa Maya and Gauteng Judge President Dunstan Mlambo praised Goosen for having assisted the judiciary in transitioning to virtual hearings, of which Goosen had been an early adopter during the COVID-19 pandemic.

During his interview, when asked about his Madzodzo judgement, Goosen expressed his belief that transformative justice was a constitutional imperative and must inform all judicial interpretation, including interpretation of the Bill of Rights. The Judicial Service Commission selected him as one of five candidates suitable for appointment, and he joined the bench on 1 December 2022.

== Academic activities ==
Goosen has several academic publications and since 2008 has been an adjunct professor in public law at the Nelson Mandela University.

== Personal life ==
He is married to Therese Boulle and has three children.
