= Alan Dodson =

South African lawyer

Alan Dodson SC

Judge of the Land Claims Court
- In office 1995–2000
- Appointed by: Nelson Mandela

Personal details
- Born: Alan Christopher Dodson; 10 July 1960 (age 65) Manzini, Swaziland
- Citizenship: South Africa
- Spouse: Raylene Keightley
- Education: Clifton Preparatory School; St Alban's College
- Alma mater: University of Natal; University of Cambridge

Alan Christopher Dodson SC (born 10 July 1960) is a South African lawyer who was a judge of the Land Claims Court from 1995 to 2000. He was also the chairperson of the United Nations's Housing and Property Claims Commission in Kosovo from 2000 to 2007. A member of the Johannesburg Bar since 2001 and Senior Counsel since 2011, he formerly practised as an attorney between 1987 and 1995.

Dodson was an acting judge in the Constitutional Court in 2023. In 2022, he was unsuccessfully nominated for permanent appointment to that court.

== Early life and education ==
Dodson was born on 10 July 1960 in Manzini, Swaziland. After attending primary school in Malkerns, Swaziland, he went on to Clifton Preparatory School in South Africa's Natal Province and matriculated at St Alban's College in 1977.

He attended the University of Natal's Pietermaritzburg campus, where he completed a BComm in 1982 and LLB cum laude in 1984. Thereafter he attended the University of Cambridge, receiving an LLM in 1988. He also holds a postgraduate diploma in tax law from the University of Cape Town, completed in 1992 while he was in legal practice. During the 1980s, Dodson was conscripted to the apartheid-era South African Defence Force, and he was court-martialled for refusing to participate in patrols of black townships.

== Legal career ==
In 1985, after graduating from the University of Natal, Dodson joined the firm Mallinicks Inc. in Cape Town as a candidate attorney. After he was admitted as an attorney in 1987, he remained at Mallinicks, ultimately becoming the head of the firm's public interest law department in 1988 and a director and partner of the firm in 1992. In 1995, he left practice to accept appointment as a judge in the Land Claims Court, serving a five-year term which ended in 2000.

In 2001, Dodson joined the Johannesburg Bar as an advocate, and he took silk in 2011. He is particularly well known for his practice in administrative law and public law and is reputed as an expert on land reform and restitution. Among other prominent matters, Dodson and Geoff Budlender represented the applicants in Land Access Movement of South Africa and Others v Chairperson of the National Council of Provinces, which was heard in the Constitutional Court of South Africa and which led to the invalidation of the Restitution of Land Rights Amendment Act. He also represented pretenders to the head of the Venda royal family and Zulu royal family.

Alongside his own practice at the bar, Dodson was the chairperson of the United Nations's Housing and Property Claims Commission in Kosovo between 2000 and 2007, and he was director of litigation at the Legal Resources Centre between 2004 and 2006. He later became a prominent figure in the disciplinary committee of the South African Independent Regulatory Board for Auditors, serving as the committee's vice-chairperson from 2006 to 2011 and as its chairperson from 2011 to 2021. In 2019, the Minister of Justice appointed him to the ministerial Reference Group on Land Justice.

In addition to his permanent stint in the Land Claims Court from 1995 to 2000, Dodson was an acting judge in the Johannesburg High Court on several occasions between 2012 and 2018, as well as in the Labour Court in 2012 and in the Land Claims Court in 2017. He wrote several reported judgements in those courts. Through November 2023, he was an acting judge in the Constitutional Court, appointed by President Cyril Ramaphosa.

== Judicial nominations ==
=== 2021 Constitutional Court shortlists ===
In February 2021, the Judicial Service Commission announced that Dodson was one of ten candidates who had been shortlisted for possible appointment to one of two permanent vacancies in the Constitutional Court. During the interviews, held in April in Sandton, Dodson was asked at length about land reform in South Africa, particularly by commissioner Dali Mpofu and Justice Minister Ronald Lamola, and he expressed his view that the Constitution licensed land expropriation without compensation. Asked directly by commissioner Julius Malema why he should be considered for appointment, as a white male, Dodson argued that the transformation of the judiciary was not only about racial and gender demographics but also encompassed the style of the court's adjudication and the broader "range of perspectives" represented on the court.

Although his interview proceeded smoothly, Dodson was among the three candidates whom the Judicial Service Commission did not recommend for appointment, the others being Dhaya Pillay and David Unterhalter. The non-profit Council for the Advancement of the South African Constitution lodged a legal challenge to the Judicial Service Commission's process, during which it obtained access to transcripts of confidential deliberations showing that Chief Justice Mogoeng Mogoeng had argued against Dodson's candidacy; according to the transcripts, Mogoeng was concerned that Dodson had "been out of judicial action" for a long time and only had experience as a permanent judge in the specialised Land Claims Court.

As a result of the legal challenge, the Judicial Service Commission agreed to re-run its interview process anew in October 2021. That interview traversed many of the same topics, including Dodson's sparse judicial record and his race, which Mpofu referred to as "the elephant in the room". On his race, Dodson responded

There's not much I can do about the fact that I'm white. There's not much I can do about the fact that I'm male. But to use words that are not mine: I am an African. I've lived in three different countries in Africa, but South Africa is my home... To the extent that I have a white skin I haven't taken advantage of it and I've done the best to use the privileges that still come with it. I don't deny there are privileges that have been attached to my white skin, but I try to use the resources and the privileges that I've had educationally for the betterment of the country and to represent the disadvantaged in South Africa.

Dodson also told the panel that, amid the COVID-19 pandemic, he believed that South Africa needed dedicated legislation for managing future pandemics.

At the conclusion of the October 2021 interviews, Dodson was again excluded from the Judicial Service Commission's list of suitable candidates. His exclusion, and that of Unterhalter, led to widespread public debate about affirmative action in the judiciary, with many commentators presuming that, given their legal experience and reputations, Dodson and Ulterhalter had been overlooked because they were white men. In respect of Dodson's judicial experience, his supporters pointed out that many Constitutional Court justices, including sitting justice Mbuyiseli Madlanga, had joined the apex court directly from the bar.

=== 2022 Constitutional Court shortlist ===
In March 2022, Dodson was again shortlisted for Constitutional Court appointment, this time as one of five candidates vying for two vacancies. He was interviewed the following month. As in former rounds of interviews, he was asked about affirmative action and land reform; he repeated his view that his appointment would advance judicial transformation insofar as he had "always accepted and adopted the transformational ethos of the constitution", as well as his view that land expropriation without compensation was constitutional. Asked whether he would engage in judicial activism, Dodson replied that, "[W]e have an activist constitution. As long as the judge comes to the case with the recognition that it's a transformative constitution, I don't think you need to be an activist to do justice." He also responded to concern about his relative paucity of judgements in commercial law, pointing to his extensive commercial experience at the Independent Regulatory Board for Auditors.

After the interviews, the Judicial Service Commission recommended Dodson and three other candidates – Fayeeza Kathree-Setiloane, Owen Rogers, and Mahube Molemela – as suitable for appointment. Because only four candidates were submitted for presidential consideration, only one of the two vacancies could be filled, and, in June 2022, President Ramaphosa announced that he had elected to appoint Rogers.

== Personal life ==
He is married to Raylene Keightley, a lawyer and Supreme Court of Appeal judge, with whom he has three sons. He was a member of the African National Congress in the early 1990s before he joined the bench.
