= Shane Kgoele =

South African judge (born 1964)

The Honourable Shane Kgoele

Judge of the Supreme Court of Appeal
- Incumbent
- Assumed office 1 December 2023
- Appointed by: Cyril Ramaphosa

Judge of the High Court
- In office 1 October 2019 – 30 November 2023
- Appointed by: Cyril Ramaphosa
- Division: Mpumalanga
- In office 25 November 2009 – 30 September 2019
- Appointed by: Jacob Zuma
- Division: North West

Personal details
- Born: 18 June 1964 (age 62) Johannesburg, Transvaal; South Africa
- Education: University of the North (BProc); University of South Africa (LLB, LLM)

Anna Maleshane Kgoele (born 18 June 1964), also spelled Annah Malefsane Kgoele, is a South African judge of the Supreme Court of Appeal. She joined the appellate court in December 2023 after 14 years in the High Court of South Africa. From 2014 to 2018, she was the president of the South African chapter of the International Association of Women Judges.

Born in Johannesburg, Kgoele began her career as a prosecutor in Taung, North West and served as a magistrate between 1991 and 2009. Thereafter she joined the bench, serving in the North West High Court from November 2009 to October 2019 and then in the Mpumalanga High Court from October 2019 to December 2023. President Cyril Ramaphosa appointed her to the Supreme Court of Appeal with effect from 1 December 2023.

== Early life and education ==
Kgoele was born on 18 June 1964 in Johannesburg. She matriculated at Alfred Maubane High School in Hammanskraal and went on to the University of the North, where she completed a BProc in 1987. Later, while serving as a magistrate, she enrolled at the University of South Africa, completing an LLB in 2005 and an LLM in 2008.

== Career in the magistrate's court ==
In 1988, after her graduation from the University of the North, Kgoele joined the Magistrate's Court in Taung as a prosecutor. After three years in that position, she was appointed as a magistrate in the court in 1991. Over the next 17 years, she rose through the ranks of the magistracy, becoming a senior magistrate in Upington in 1999 and regional magistrate in Pretoria–Mamelodi in 2007.

During this period, Kgoele was involved in the training of junior magistrates, serving as a lecturer in the national Justice College from 2001 to 2007, during which time she helped develop several training manuals. She was also a member of the Judicial Officers Association of South Africa between 2001 and 2009. In 2008, she served as an acting judge for the first time, sitting in the North West Division of the High Court of South Africa in Mahikeng, North West Province.

== North West High Court: 2009–2019 ==
In November 2009, President Jacob Zuma announced that, on the advice of the Judicial Service Commission, Kgoele would join the bench permanently as a judge of the North West High Court, with immediate effect. She served in the Mahikeng High Court for close to a decade during the Judge Presidency of Monica Leeuw.

In April 2017, Kgoele was one of two candidates whom the Judicial Service Commission shortlisted and interviewed for possible appointment as North West Deputy Judge President, Leeuw's deputy. However, during the interviews, Leeuw accused Kgoele of being uncooperative and denied Kgoele's claim that the pair had a good working relationship, saying, "It is not true that we have a good relationship. She has on and off days." Chief Justice Mogoeng Mogoeng intervened, comparing Leeuw's questioning to cross-examination, and another commissioner observed that Kgoele was apparently regarded as the "problem child" of Leeuw's division. Observers described Kgoele as having "appeared ill-prepared and under-qualified — often ponderous in her responses", and Mogoeng commented that he "thought that in preparation for this interview you would do more [research]".

The Judicial Service Commission declined to approve either Kgoele or her competitor, judge Rodney Hendricks, for appointment to the Deputy Judge President position. However, she served as acting Deputy Judge President between 30 July and 21 September 2018.

== Mpumalanga High Court: 2019–2023 ==
In October 2019, Kgoele was transferred to the bench of the High Court's newly established Mpumalanga Division, where she served for the next four years.

=== 2021 Deputy Judge Presidency shortlist ===
In February 2021, the Judicial Service Commission announced that Kgoele was one of two candidates who had been shortlisted for possible appointment as Deputy Judge President of the Mpumalanga Division. She was interviewed in April, with the Judicial Service Commission asking her about her altercation with Leeuw at the North West Division and about a submission from a private law firm, which objected to Kgoele's candidacy on the grounds that she had "arrogant disregard" for others and lacked "composure and understanding of the law". After the interviews, the Judicial Service Commission recommended that the other candidate, Segopotje Mphahlele, should be appointed. However, Kgoele stood in for Mphahlele as acting Deputy Judge President for four months in 2020, first between January and March and then between October and November.

=== 2022 Supreme Court of Appeal shortlist ===
Between December 2020 and September 2022, Kgoele served lengthy terms as an acting judge in the Supreme Court of Appeal, from December 2020 to November 2021 and then from June 2022 to September 2022. During that time, she wrote for the majority of the court in several important judgements, including Brightwater Props v Eastern Cape Development Corporation, a case in procurement law.

While Kgoele was acting in the court in July 2022, the Judicial Service Commission announced that she was one of five candidates who had been shortlisted for possible appointment to five permanent vacancies in the Supreme Court of Appeal. She was interviewed for two full hours in Melrose in October, but the Judicial Service Commission declined to recommend her for appointment.

== Supreme Court of Appeal: 2023–present ==
In October 2023, the Judicial Service Commission interviewed Kgoele again, this time for four new vacancies at the Supreme Court of Appeal. During the interview, Xola Petse, the Deputy President of the Supreme Court of Appeal, told Kgoele that senior members of the Supreme Court of Appeal had criticised her writing skills as "not concise and underpinned by linear reasoning, focusing on material facts only". Kgoele took issue with this criticism, saying that it was too generalised to be constructive, but other commissioners pointed out that Kgoele had only submitted co-authored judgements with her application, making it difficult for the panel to evaluate her writing ability. Petse also said that, in Kgoele's 2022 interview, he had advised her that, "you are not ready to ascend to the Bench of the [Supreme Court] and that more acting stints would help you perfect your judgment writing skills" – but that Kgoele had subsequently declined an invitation to spend more time as an acting judge in the Supreme Court.

Nonetheless, after the interviews, the Judicial Service Commission recommended Kgoele and Fayeeza Kathree-Setiloane for appointment, declining to fill the other two vacancies. The recommendation was controversial: although Kathree-Setiloane had been viewed as a frontrunner, several commentators said that it was "puzzling" that Kgoele had been selected when other equally or better-qualified candidates, such as David Unterhalter, had not. In the subsequent media furore, the Judicial Service Commission released an explanation of its decision process, saying in respect of Kgoele that some commissioners were "not convinced" by Kgoele's performance and grasp of the law, but that she had nonetheless received the requisite 12 of 23 votes from commissioners. In November, President Cyril Ramaphosa confirmed Kgoele and Kathree-Setiloane's appointment with effect from 1 December 2023.

== International Association of Women Judges ==
In 2004, Kgoele was a founding member of the South African chapter of the International Association of Women Judges. She served as the North West provincial coordinator of the chapter from 2010 to 2014 and then served two terms as its national president from 2014 to 2018; for part of the latter period, between 2015 and 2017, she was president of the association's African region. She remains a trustee of the South African chapter.

== Personal life ==
Kgoele is unmarried.
