= Thoba Poyo-Dlwati =

South African judge

The Honourable Thoba Poyo-Dlwati

Judge President of the KwaZulu-Natal High Court
- Incumbent
- Assumed office 16 January 2023
- Appointed by: Cyril Ramaphosa
- Deputy: Isaac Madondo
- Preceded by: Achmat Jappie

Judge of the High Court
- Incumbent
- Assumed office 1 June 2014
- Appointed by: Jacob Zuma
- Division: KwaZulu-Natal

Personal details
- Born: Thoba Portia Poyo; 15 September 1975 (age 51) Nkwenkwana, Engcobo; Cape Province, South Africa
- Spouse: Mahlubonke Dlwati
- Education: University of Transkei

Thoba Portia Poyo-Dlwati (born 15 September 1975) is a South African judge who is currently serving as the Judge President of the KwaZulu-Natal High Court. She joined the court as a puisne judge in June 2014 and was elevated to the judge presidency in January 2023, appointed by President Cyril Ramaphosa as the division's first female judge president.

Born in the Eastern Cape, Poyo-Dlwati entered legal practice in 1999 in Pietermaritzburg, where she was an attorney and conveyancer. She was the president of the KwaZulu-Natal Law Society in 2008 and the co-chairperson of the Law Society of South Africa from 2009 to 2010. In August 2023, she was elected as president of the South African chapter of the International Association of Women Judges.

== Early life and education ==
Poyo-Dlwati was born on 15 September 1975 in Nkwenkwana, a rural area outside Engcobo in the former Cape Province. She matriculated at the Mount Arthur Girls High School in nearby Lady Frere and went on to the University of Transkei, where she completed a BProc in 1995.

After her graduation, she moved from the Cape Province to Pietermaritzburg, KwaZulu-Natal, where she served brief stints as a part-time high school teacher and as a casual worker at Truworths. In 1997, she completed a postgraduate diploma in tax at the University of KwaZulu-Natal.

== Legal career ==
Between 1997 and 1999, Poyo-Dlwati completed her articles of clerkship in Pietermaritzburg, first at Jenny Budree & Associates and then at Hoskins & Ngcobo Attorneys. She was admitted as an attorney and conveyancer of the High Court of South Africa on 12 February 1999. Thereafter, she remained at Hoskins & Ngcobo Attorneys, which became Ngcobo, Poyo & Diedricks Attorneys in August 2000 when she became a partner and director at the firm. She held that management role until she joined the bench in May 2014, and in her own practice, she specialised in property law and administrative law.

At the same time, Poyo-Dlwati held a number of leadership positions in law-related civil society organisations. She had been a member of the Pietemaritzburg branch of the Black Lawyers' Association since 1997, and she went on to serve as the branch's chairperson from 2003 to 2005. She was a founding member of the KwaZulu-Natal chapter of the South African Women Lawyers Association in 2007 and served as the chapter's secretary from 2007 to 2009; she was the president of the KwaZulu-Natal Law Society in 2008; and she was co-chairperson of the Law Society of South Africa from 2009 to 2010. She also represented South Africa in the SADC Lawyers' Association and was the association's vice-president from 2008 to 2010 and its president from 2010 to 2012.

In the public sector, Poyo-Dlwati was a member of the Deeds Registries Regulation Board from 2003 to 2014, a member of the KwaZulu-Natal Bid Appeals Tribunal from 2005 to 2014, and a member of the Rules Board of Courts from 2012 to 2014. On various occasions between 2003 and 2011, she served as an assessor in the Pietermaritzburg High Court. She sat as an acting judge in that court for the first time in October 2012 and several times thereafter.

== KwaZulu-Natal High Court: 2014–present ==
In May 2014, President Jacob Zuma announced that Poyo-Dlwati would join the bench as a permanent member of the KwaZulu-Natal Division of the High Court. She took office on 1 June 2014.

While in the High Court, she served as an acting judge in the Supreme Court of Appeal for a full year between June 2020 and May 2021. During that time, she wrote the court's unanimous judgement in Discovery Life v Hogan, which concerned the validity of a life insurance contract. She has also acted in the Competition Appeal Court. Between April and September 2022, she served as acting Deputy Judge President in the KwaZulu-Natal Division; she was appointed to that position by Deputy Judge President Isaac Madondo, who was filling in for retired Judge President Achmat Jappie.

In late 2019, Poyo-Dlwati was selected to receive mediator training in the U.S. as part of South Africa's efforts to improve mediation opportunities via court-annexed processes. Her cohort of judges included Aubrey Ledwaba, Nolwazi Mabindla-Boqwana, Glenn Goosen (judge), Raylene Keightley, Norman Davis, and Phineas Mojapelo (ret.). She and her U.S.-trained judge colleagues were involved in the leadership of a national summit and mediation training for S.A. judges in Cape Town in July 2022. Court-annexed mediation was the focus of the meetings. The South African Judicial Education Institute (SAJEI) and several additional judges were prominent in that effort, including former Chief Justice Raymond Zondo, former JPs Dunstan Mlambo and Francis Legodi (ret.), as well as faculty members and mediators from the U.S.--Judge Ben H. Hadfield (ret.), Nathan D. Alder, Velvet Rodriquez, and Stephen D. Kelson. C.J. Zondo expressed full support of court-based mediation stating that he would "like it to take off as soon as possible."

=== Judge Presidency ===
In October 2022, Poyo-Dlwati was one of three candidates whom the Judicial Service Commission shortlisted and interviewed as candidates to replace Jappie as Judge President. The other candidates were acting Judge President Madondo and judge Esther Steyn, both of whom were senior to Poyo-Dlwati in the KwaZulu-Natal division; indeed, Madondo repeatedly urged the Judicial Service Commission not to "kick out an experienced driver and put in a learner" by elevating Steyn or Poyo-Dlwati over him. However, in her interview, Poyo-Dlwati dismissed concerns about her age and relative inexperience as the result of "undercurrents of patriarchy". She said that she had been "blessed with the ability to lead" and had "the support of the majority of judges" in the province. She also presented the panel with a series of objectives for the KwaZulu-Natal Division, including reopening circuit courts to improve access to justice, promoting mediation over litigation, and introducing judicial mentorship programmes.

After the interview, the Judicial Service Commission recommended Poyo-Dlwati for appointment to the position. Two months later, President Cyril Ramaphosa confirmed her appointment with effect from 16 January 2023. She was the first woman to serve as Judge President in KwaZulu-Natal and, at the time of her appointment, she was the only woman judge president in the country, making her the second-most senior woman in judicial leadership, behind Deputy Chief Justice Mandisa Maya.

== International Association of Women Judges ==
Poyo-Dlwati joined the South African chapter of the International Association of Women Judges in 2018, and in 2021 she was elected as deputy president of the chapter, under Deputy Chief Justice Maya. In August 2023, she was elected to succeed Maya as president, with Mpumalanga Judge President Segopotje Mphahlele as her deputy.

== Personal life ==
She is married to Mahlubonke Dlwati, a medical doctor, and has two children. She is a member of the Maritzburg Christian Church in Pietermaritzburg and she has been a trustee of the Victoria and Griffiths Mxenge Memorial Trust since 2009.
