= Phineas Mojapelo =

South African judge

Deputy Judge President of the Gauteng High Court
- In office 1 January 2005 – 14 June 2020
- Appointed by: Thabo Mbeki
- President: Bernard Ngoepe; Dunstan Mlambo
- Division: North Gauteng
- Succeeded by: Roland Sutherland

Judge of the High Court
- In office 27 January 2003 – 14 June 2020
- Appointed by: Thabo Mbeki
- Division: Gauteng

Personal details
- Born: Phineas Mathale Deon Mojapelo; 11 June 1951 (age 75) Polokwane, Transvaal; Union of South Africa
- Education: University of the North

Phineas Mathale Deon Mojapelo (born 11 June 1951) is a South African retired judge of the High Court of South Africa. He was the Deputy Judge President of the South Gauteng Division from January 2005 to June 2020, and he joined the bench in January 2003 as a puisne judge of the North Gauteng Division. He was also an acting judge in the Constitutional Court of South Africa in 2017. He is a professional mediator (trained in the U.S.), and the current director of mediation services, especially training new mediators, at the Arbitration Foundation of Southern Africa (AFSA) in Sandton, South Africa.

Born in Polokwane, Limpopo, Mojapelo began his legal career as an attorney in Nelspruit, Mpumalanga, where he ran a prominent law firm with Mathews Phosa and Ephraim Makgoba. He was national president of the Black Lawyers Association from 1991 to 1995, and he is also a former member of the Judicial Service Commission and South African Law Reform Commission.

== Early life and education ==
Mojapelo was born on 11 June 1951 in Polokwane in the former Northern Transvaal. His mother was a teacher and he grew up in a large household with his maternal family. He matriculated at Tshebela High School on the rural outskirts of Polokwane and studied law at the University of the North, where he completed a BProc and an LLB. His university class also included Monica Leeuw, Cyril Ramaphosa, and Mathews Phosa, and his time in Turfloop coincided with the height of the Black Consciousness Movement; he was a member of the South African Students' Organisation.

== Legal career ==
After his graduation, Mojapelo remained at the University of the North for a year as a lecturer in private law and African customary law. Thereafter, from January 1978 to December 1979, he completed his articles of clerkship at Webber Wentzel, a prominent White firm then based at the Standard Bank Centre in Johannesburg. Although Mojapelo had been a vacation clerk at the firm as an undergraduate, he was only the second or third Black student to become an articled clerk there.

In January 1980, Mojapelo was admitted as an attorney of the Supreme Court of South Africa. He moved to Nelspruit in the Eastern Transvaal, where he opened a law firm with Mathews Phosa (his former classmate) and Ephraim Makgoba (a former student). Theirs was the first ever Black-run law firm in the region. Mojapelo later said that most of the firm's early cases were "cases involving friction between the races, whether in the commercial sphere or in the criminal sphere"; their clients included trade union formations and Enos Mabuza, the Chief Minister of the nearby bantustan of KaNgwane.

Mojapelo also joined the Black Lawyers Association in 1980 and served as its secretary from 1985 to 1991 and then as its national president from 1991 to 1995. In the public sphere, he was a member of the Judicial Service Commission from 1994 to 2002, a member of the South African Law Reform Commission from 1996 to 2001, and an acting judge in the Pretoria High Court in 1999 and 2001.

== Gauteng High Court: 2003–2020 ==
In November 2002, President Thabo Mbeki announced that, on the advice of the Judicial Service Commission, Mojapelo would join the bench permanently as a judge of the Transvaal Provincial Division (later the North Gauteng Division) of the High Court of South Africa. He took office on 27 January 2003.

Less than two years later, President Mbeki announced that Mojapelo would be transferred to the High Court's Witwatersrand Local Division (South Gauteng Division), where he would become Deputy Judge President of the division. He took office on 1 January 2005.

Thereafter he served in the High Court until his retirement in June 2020. During his tenure, he was an acting judge in the Constitutional Court in early 2017, and he was an acting judge in the Supreme Court of Appeal from December 2019 to March 2020.

=== Notable judgments ===
During his second year on the bench, in Christian Lawyers' Association v Minister of Health, Mojapelo dismissed a challenge to the constitutionality of the Choice on Termination of Pregnancy Act, 1996, finding that the Constitution licensed its provision for girls under the age of 18 to have abortions without parental consent. In May 2016, Mojapelo certified South Africa's largest-ever class action suit, brought by mineworkers in Nkala v Harmony Gold; and in February 2017, in Democratic Alliance v Minister of International Relations and Cooperation, he blocked the state's attempt to withdraw from the Rome Statute.

In 2019, sitting in the Equality Court, Mojapelo presided in Nelson Mandela Foundation Trust v Afriforum, in which he found that gratuitous displays of the apartheid-era South African flag amounted to hate speech under the Promotion of Equality and Prevention of Unfair Discrimination Act, 2000. The ruling was politically sensitive and developed judicial precedent insofar as it found that the Equality Act's definition of hate speech extended to gestures, as well as words. His judgment was largely upheld by the Supreme Court of Appeal in 2023.

Other politically sensitive matters heard by Mojapelo included several involving prominent political figures. In 2008, he led a full bench in adjudicating Western Cape Judge President John Hlophe's lawsuit against the Constitutional Court and its justices, and in 2014, he set aside Zwelinzima Vavi's suspension as the general secretary of the Congress of South African Trade Unions. He was also scheduled to preside in the rape trial of former Deputy President Jacob Zuma, but he did not avail himself for personal reasons, with media reporting that he had known Zuma personally during apartheid.

=== Nomination to judge presidency ===
In early 2012, as Bernard Ngoepe approached retirement, Mojapelo emerged as a frontrunner to succeed Ngoepe as Judge President of the Gauteng Division. His primary competitor was perceived to be Dunstan Mlambo; according to the Mail & Guardian, Mojapelo's candidacy was supported by the National Association of Democratic Lawyers but opposed by elements of the Black Lawyers' Association which viewed him as a participant in "the liberal agenda of fighting the ANC-led government through the courts". However, the Black Lawyers' Association ultimately endorsed Mojapelo too.

In March 2012, the Judicial Service Commission announced Mojapelo, Mlambo, and Francis Legodi as the three shortlisted candidates for the judge presidency, and they were interviewed in Cape Town the following month. Mojapelo's lengthy interview was consumed with unfriendly questioning about an op-ed he had published the previous year. In the op-ed, published in the Sunday Times, Mojapelo argued that the Judicial Service Commission had departed from proper procedure in appointing Sandile Ngcobo as Chief Justice of South Africa in 2009. During the interview, he was pressed on his argument by panellists Nomvula Mokonyane and, especially, Jeff Radebe, then the Minister of Justice. In the aftermath, the Judicial Service Commission announced Mlambo as its preferred candidate for the judge presidency. The Mail & Guardian said that the decision, while unsurprising, was "likely to send ripples through the legal fraternity".

== Retirement ==
In March 2021, Mojapelo wrote on behalf of the Judicial Conduct Committee of the Judicial Service Commission in adjudicating a series of complaints against Chief Justice Mogoeng Mogoeng. Mogoeng was ordered to retract and apologise for certain controversial remarks he had made about South African policy toward the state of Israel. In an appeal, Mogoeng said that Mojapelo's "reasoning is flawed and disturbingly superficial".

In May 2023, President Cyril Ramaphosa (another of Mojapelo's contemporaries at university) appointed Mojapelo to chair an independent panel tasked with investigating the Lady R incident. The other members of the panel were Enver Surty and Advocate Leah Gcabashe. The Democratic Alliance later challenged Mojapelo's appointment to the panel, arguing that it undermined judicial independence.

Mojapelo is an active commercial mediator and arbitrator, and is deeply involved in the expansion of mediation opportunities in South Africa and other southern African nations. Following his training in 2019 (in the U.S.), he has consistently advocated for more access to mediation for the people of his country. He is among the most prominent mediators—and mediation trainers—in South Africa.

Mojapelo is credited, along with others, for the rapid expansion of mediation opportunities in South Africa. In October and November 2019 he traveled to the United States with six other S.A. judges to receive mediator training, but with specific instructions to return with plans for how to develop court-annexed mediation. The seven judges have been engaged in that effort since that time. In July 2022, Mojapelo helped arrange for a national mediation summit in Cape Town where a large number of judges from various levels of court were trained in mediation practices; court-annexed mediation was the focus of their attention. The South African Judicial Education Institute (SAJEI) and several judges were prominent in that effort, including his six colleagues from the U.S.-mediation-training group -- Audrey Ledwaba, Thoba Poyo-Dlwati, Nolwazi Mabindla-Boqwana, Glenn Goosen (judge), Raylene Keightley, and Norman Davis. Additionally, Dunstan Mlambo and Francis Legodi were leaders at the conference; faculty members and mediators from the U.S. included Judge Ben H. Hadfield (ret.), Nathan D. Alder, Velvet Rodriquez and Stephen D. Kelson. Chief Justice Raymond Zondo attended the meetings and expressed full support for court-based mediation, stating that he would "like it to take off as soon as possible."

== Personal life ==
Mojapelo is married to Setlola Phoshoko-Mojapelo and was formerly married to Mamokete Bellinah Mojapelo (née Koopa). He has four children.
