= Nolwazi =

Nolwazi is a feminine given name. Notable people with the name include:

- Nkosazana Daughter (Nkosazana Nolwazi Kimberly Nzama; born 2000), South African singer and songwriter
- Nolwazi Mabindla-Boqwana (born 1973), South African judge
- Nolwazi Hlabangane (born 1995), South African rugby player
