= Raylene Keightley =

South African judge

The Honourable Raylene Keightley

Judge of the Supreme Court of Appeal
- Incumbent
- Assumed office 1 July 2024
- Appointed by: Cyril Ramaphosa

Judge of the High Court
- In office 1 January 2016 – 30 June 2024
- Appointed by: Jacob Zuma
- Division: Gauteng

Personal details
- Born: Raylene May Keightley; 19 November 1961 (age 64) Kokstad, Cape Province; South Africa
- Spouse: Alan Dodson
- Education: University of Natal (BA, LLB); University of Cambridge (LLM)

Raylene May Keightley (born 19 November 1961) is a South African judge of the Supreme Court of Appeal. She was appointed to the bench in the Gauteng High Court in January 2016 after a career as a legal academic and practising lawyer. She was admitted as an attorney in 1986 and as an advocate in 2006.

Born in the Eastern Cape, Keightley began her career at the University of Cape Town and University of the Witwatersrand, where she taught law between 1988 and 1999. Thereafter she spent seven years at the Asset Forfeiture Unit of the National Prosecuting Authority. From 2006 to 2015, she practised law at the Johannesburg Bar, with a stint as the director of the Centre for Applied Legal Studies between 2008 and 2011. She was appointed to the bench by President Jacob Zuma in 2016 and was elevated to the Supreme Court by President Cyril Ramaphosa in 2024.

== Early life and education ==
Keightley was born on 19 November 1961 in Kokstad in the former Cape Province. She matriculated at Umtata High School in Mthatha and would complete a BA and LLB (1984) at the University of Natal. She completed an LLM at the University of Cambridge in 1988, winning Gonville and Caius College's Sir William McNair Prize for best LLM student.

== Legal and academic career ==
From 1985 to 1986, between her LLB and her LLM, Keightley was a candidate attorney at the firm of Balsillie, Watermeyer and Cawood in Cape Town; she was admitted as an attorney in 1986. Upon her return to South Africa from Cambridge in 1988, she joined the law faculty at the University of Cape Town, where she taught until 1995, first as a lecturer and then, from 1991, as a senior lecturer. In 1996, she moved to Johannesburg, becoming a senior lecturer at the University of the Witwatersrand's School of Law. She was promoted to professor in 1999 and also served as an assistant dean in that year.

Thereafter, however, Keightley returned to legal practice. Between 1999 and 2001, she was senior state advocate in the Asset Forfeiture Unit of the National Prosecuting Authority. In 2001, she was admitted as an advocate of the High Court of South Africa and was promoted to the position of deputy director of Public Prosecutions in the Asset Forfeiture Unit. She left that job in 2003 to become the unit's regional head in Johannesburg.

In July 2006, Keightley left the National Prosecuting Authority to serve her pupillage at the Johannesburg Bar. Between 2006 and 2015, she was a practising advocate at the bar, first at the Island Group of Advocates and then at Thulamela Chambers. At the same time, from 2008 to 2011, she returned to the University of the Witwatersrand to serve as the director of the university's Centre for Applied Legal Studies. She also served on several occasions as an acting judge in the Gauteng Division of the High Court; she served on the bench, both in Johannesburg and in Pretoria, for four periods between October 2013 and August 2015.

== Gauteng High Court: 2015–2024 ==
In October 2015, the Judicial Service Commission shortlisted and interviewed Keightley for one of six permanent vacancies in the Gauteng High Court. The commission recommended her for appointment after the interviews were held, and in December, President Jacob Zuma confirmed her appointment with effect from 1 January 2016.

The following year, in October 2017, Keightley handed down a landmark ruling on the unconstitutionality of corporal punishment by parents, finding that neither religious defences nor the common-law defence of "reasonable chastisement" sufficed to overrule the best interests of the child and justify corporal punishment. Her ruling was upheld by the Constitutional Court in September 2019 in Freedom of Religion South Africa v Minister of Justice and Constitutional Development. Other notable rulings by Keightley include a July 2019 ruling which prohibited the application of set-off to credit agreements under the National Credit Act, as well as an October 2022 ruling which reinstated Mpho Phalatse as the Mayor of Johannesburg following an unconstitutional vote of no confidence.

In the fall of 2019, Keightley was selected to receive mediator training in the U.S. as part of South Africa's efforts to improve mediation opportunities via court-annexed processes. Her cohort of judges included Aubrey Ledwaba, Nolwazi Mabindla-Boqwana, Thoba Poyo-Dlwati, Glenn Goosen (judge), Norman Davis, and Phineas Mojapelo (ret.). She and her U.S.-trained judge colleagues were involved planning a national summit (mediation training) for S.A. judges in Cape Town in July 2022. Court-annexed mediation was their focus. The South African Judicial Education Institute (SAJEI) and several additional judges were prominent in that effort, including former Chief Justice Raymond Zondo, and former JPs Dunstan Mlambo and Francis Legodi (ret.), as well as faculty members and mediators from the U.S. -- Judge Ben H. Hadfield (ret.), Nathan D. Alder, Velvet Rodriquez, and Stephen D. Kelson. C.J. Zondo expressed full support of court-based mediation stating that he would "like it to take off as soon as possible."

Keightley was an acting judge in the Supreme Court of Appeal for two terms between July 2023 and March 2024. During that time, the court heard an appeal of an Equality Court decision which found that it was not hate speech for the Economic Freedom Fighters to sing 'Dubul' ibhunu’ (“Kill the Boer”). Ahead of the appeal, the appellant, political lobby group AfriForum, lodged a formal request that Keightley should recuse herself from the matter. According to AfriForum, Keightley had "demonstrated bias" against it in 2018, when Keightley, presiding in a previous unrelated High Court dispute, said that AfriForum was “barking up the wrong tree” and even suggested to counsel that “next time you in front of me with [AfriForum] you might to wish to apply for my recusal”. The application for recusal was refused.

== Supreme Court of Appeal: 2024–present ==
In May 2024, the Judicial Service Commission recommended Keightley for permanent elevation to the Supreme Court of Appeal. After her appointment was confirmed by President Cyril Ramaphosa, she joined the bench on 1 July 2024.

== Personal life ==
Keightley is married to prominent advocate and former acting justice of the Constitutional Court, Alan Dodson SC, with whom she has three sons.
