= Segopotje Mphahlele =

South African judge (born 1968)

The Honourable Segopotje Mphahlele

Judge President of the Mpumalanga High Court
- Incumbent
- Assumed office 2023
- Appointed by: Cyril Ramaphosa
- Preceded by: Frans Legodi

Deputy Judge President of the Mpumalanga High Court
- In office 2021–2023
- Appointed by: Cyril Ramaphosa
- President: Frans Legodi
- Preceded by: Division established

Judge of the High Court
- Incumbent
- Assumed office 2019
- Appointed by: Cyril Ramaphosa
- Division: Mpumalanga
- In office 2013–2019
- Appointed by: Jacob Zuma
- Division: Gauteng

Personal details
- Born: August 1968 (age 58) Mamelodi, Pretoria; Transvaal, South Africa
- Education: University of the North

Segopotje Sheila Mphahlele (born August 1968) is a South African judge who is currently serving as the Judge President of the Mpumalanga High Court. Formerly an attorney and insolvency practitioner, she has been a judge of the High Court of South Africa since December 2013.

Born in Pretoria, Mphahlele was appointed to the Gauteng Division of the High Court in 2013, but she transferred to the Mpumalanga Division when it was established in 2019. She was appointed as the division's inaugural Deputy Judge President in 2021 and became its first female Judge President in 2023, in both cases at the appointment of President Cyril Ramaphosa.

== Early life and education ==
Mphahlele was born in August 1968 in Mamelodi outside Pretoria. She attended the University of the North, where she completed a BProc in 1991 and an LLB in 1993.

== Legal career ==
She began her legal career in 1994 as a claims handler at the Road Accident Fund, and between 1995 and 1996, she served her articles of clerkship at Routledges in Johannesburg and Lephoko & Ledwaba Attorneys in Pretoria. She was admitted as an attorney in June 1998, and in September 1999 she established her own legal practice, Mphahlele Attorneys, which she ran until 2013. Her practice was generalist, traversing property law, employment law, commercial law, and estates, and it included litigation in the magistrates' courts and High Court of South Africa.

During the same period, between 2000 and 2013, she was an insolvency practitioner, managing the insolvency practice at the Merithing Trust. She also served on various regulatory bodies, including the Financial Services Board licensing committee, the Companies Tribunal, the Broadcasting Complaints Commission appeals tribunal, the Compensation Commission, and the Magistrates Commission. She was Pretoria branch chairperson for the National Association of Democratic Lawyers, the deputy president of the Northern Provinces Law Society, and, from 2005, the first female chairperson of the Gauteng Law Council.

== Gauteng High Court: 2013–2019 ==
In October 2013, Mphahlele was one of six candidates whom the Judicial Service Commission shortlisted and interviewed for possible appointment to four judicial vacancies in the Gauteng Division of the High Court. After her interview in Cape Town, the Judicial Service Commission recommended Mphahlele for appointment, which President Jacob Zuma confirmed with effect from 2 December 2013.

Sitting in Middelburg, Mpumalanga in 2017, Mphahlele presided in the coffin case, concerning an assault on a black man which received international coverage. She convicted the two assailants of attempted murder, among other charges, and, in a scathing ruling, sentenced both to lengthy prison sentences. The sentences were welcomed by the South African government, but they were cut short in 2019 when the Supreme Court of Appeal overturned the attempted murder convictions in Oosthuizen v State.

== Mpumalanga High Court: 2019–present ==
During her later years in the Gauteng High Court, Mphahlele was centrally involved in strengthening the High Court's circuit in Mpumalanga Province, and she transferred to the Mpumalanga Division when it was established in 2019; indeed, she served as acting Deputy Judge President in early 2019. Later the same year, in Middelburg, she presided in the highly publicised murder trial of Zinhle Maditla, who was sentenced to life imprisonment for poisoning her four children.

=== Deputy Judge Presidency ===
In February 2021, Mphahlele and one other candidate, judge Shane Kgoele, were shortlisted for the position of Deputy Judge President of the Mpumalanga Division, a position which had not been filled permanently since the court's inauguration. During the interviews, held in April, Mphahlele was asked about the court's administrative challenges, as well as about her judgement in the coffin case, which was the only of her judgements which had been overturned on appeal. Although Judge President Frans Legodi praised her temperament, the panel also pointed to a submission from the Mpumalanga Society of Advocates which complained about her treatment of counsel. Mphahlele responded that, "Their complaint was that I called them to order in court and not in private", which she did not to embarrass the counsel but to improve the efficiency of the court.

Following the interviews, the Judicial Service Commission recommended Mphahlele for appointment, and President Cyril Ramaphosa confirmed her appointment with effect from 1 July 2021.

=== Judge Presidency ===
In April 2023, as the retirement of Judge President Legodi approached, Mphahlele and judge Brian Mashile were shortlisted as possible successors. When the Judicial Service Commission interviewed Mphahlele that month, Legodi said that he had "started offloading" his leadership responsibilities onto her as "kind of a hand-over". Much of the rest of the interview was consumed by discussion of challenges facing the division, including loadshedding and case backlogs; Mphahlele also proposed that mobile courts should be established to improve access to justice, and she openly urged Justice Minister Ronald Lamola to augment the division's financial resources. One commissioner raised concern that Mphahlele had no reported judgements, given that judge presidents should provide "intellectual leadership" as well as administrative leadership. Nonetheless, the commission recommended Mphahlele for appointment.

In August 2023, she was elected as vice-president of the South African chapter of the International Association of Women Judges; in that capacity, she deputises KwaZulu-Natal Judge President Thoba Poyo-Dlwati.
