= Aubrey Ledwaba =

South African judge (born 1962)

The Honourable Aubrey Ledwaba

Deputy Judge President of the Gauteng High Court
- Incumbent
- Assumed office 1 July 2013
- Appointed by: Jacob Zuma
- Judge President: Dunstan Mlambo

Judge of the High Court
- Incumbent
- Assumed office 1 November 2005
- Appointed by: Thabo Mbeki
- Division: Gauteng

Personal details
- Born: Aubrey Phago Ledwaba; 9 October 1962 (age 63) Pretoria, Transvaal; South Africa
- Spouse: Nomalanga Ledwaba
- Education: Mamelodi High School
- Alma mater: University of the North

Aubrey Phago Ledwaba (born 9 October 1962) is a South African judge who is currently serving as the Judge President (JP) of the Gauteng Division of the High Court of South Africa. He previously served as Deputy Judge President (DJP) of the Gauteng Division. Formerly a practising attorney in Gauteng, he joined the bench as a puisne judge in November 2005 and was elevated to his DJP leadership position in July 2013 and as JP in 2026. He was an acting judge in the Constitutional Court in 2019 and an acting judge in the Supreme Court of Appeal between 2020 and 2021.

== Early life and education ==
Ledwaba was born on 9 October 1962 in Pretoria in the former Transvaal Province. He matriculated at Mamelodi High School in Pretoria in 1979 and went on to the University of the North, where he completed a BProc in 1983.

== Legal career ==
Ledwaba began his legal career as a public prosecutor between 1983 and 1984. Thereafter he served his articles of clerkship until he was admitted as an attorney of the Supreme Court of South Africa in 1986. For the next two decades, he practised as an attorney in the Transvaal (renamed Gauteng after the end of apartheid), running his own legal firm. Between 2003 and 2005, he was also a commissioner of the Small Claims Court and a member of the Magistrates Commission.

== Gauteng High Court: 2005–present ==
On 1 November 2005, Ledwaba joined the bench as a judge of the Transvaal Division (later renamed the Gauteng Division) of the High Court of South Africa. He has served in the court since then. In May 2013, President Jacob Zuma announced that Ledwaba would be promoted to become Deputy Judge President of the Gauteng Division with effect from 1 July 2013. His appointment, which followed interviews with the Judicial Service Commission the previous month, attracted some controversy about affirmative action, given that he had been selected over two strong female candidates.

During his service in the High Court, Ledwaba also held positions of responsibility elsewhere in the judiciary. He was a member of the Office of the Chief Justice's Judiciary Case Flow Management Committee and chaired its Court Interpreters Capacitation Committee between 2014 and 2016, and he was the vice chairperson of the National Council for Correctional Services from 2010 to 2013. He was appointed to the South African Law Reform Commission's Alternative Dispute Resolution Advisory Committee in 2018, and he was appointed as the chairperson of the Magistrates Commission on 1 April 2019.

=== Matters involving Jacob Zuma ===
In April 2016, Ledwaba wrote the Gauteng High Court's decision in a politically sensitive matter concerning the Arms Deal-related corruption charges against sitting President Jacob Zuma. Those charges had been dropped in April 2009 amid the spy tapes scandal, but Ledwaba set aside head prosecutor Mokotedi Mpshe's decision to drop the charges, ruling that the decision had been irrational. In a related decision, in December 2018, Ledwaba ruled that the state was not liable for the legal costs incurred by Zuma in his defence against the reinstated corruption charges. Both decisions were upheld on appeal by the Supreme Court of Appeal, and, in the latter case, Zuma was served with punitive costs for having publicly implied that Ledwaba's ruling was biased.

=== Deputy Judge Presidency ===
In August 2019, President Cyril Ramaphosa successfully petitioned Ledwaba, in his capacity as Deputy Judge President, to seal elements of the evidentiary record (including Ramaphosa's bank statements) related to an unfavourable report by the Public Protector on Ramaphosa's CR17 political campaign. The Public Protector, Busisiwe Mkhwebane, objected to Ledwaba's decision to seal the record, and the opposition Economic Freedom Fighters (EFF) subsequently launched a formal legal challenge to the decision, seeking to have the record unsealed. However, in July 2021, the Pretoria High Court dismissed the EFF's application; the EFF was also denied leave to appeal.

In 2023, acting as Judge President in the absence of Judge President Dunstan Mlambo, Ledwaba oversaw the management of the high-profile Senzo Meyiwa murder trial.

=== Judge Presidency ===
President Cyril Ramaphosa appointed Ledwaba to be Judge President (JP) of the Gauteng Division of the High Court effective May 15, 2026.

=== Higher courts ===
Between January and June 2019, Ledwaba served as an acting judge in the Constitutional Court of South Africa. During that time, he wrote the Constitutional Court's unanimous judgement in Moyo v Minister of Police; Sonti v Minister of Police, which struck down provisions of the apartheid-era Intimidation Act, finding them unconstitutional. He also served for a year as an acting judge in the Supreme Court of Appeal between April 2020 and May 2021, during which time he wrote judgements in high-profile matters concerning the murders of Ahmed Timol and Matlhomola Moshoeu, among others.

In February 2021, the Judicial Service Commission announced that Ledwaba had been shortlisted both for a vacancy on the Constitutional Court and for one of five vacancies at the Supreme Court of Appeal. He later withdrew his candidacy for the Constitutional Court position, but in April 2021 he was one of the eleven candidates who was interviewed for the Supreme Court vacancies. During the interview, the Judicial Service Commission panel discussed various attacks on Ledwaba's integrity, emanating from his decision to seal the CR17 bank records at President Ramaphosa's request. Ledwaba was given the opportunity to explain and defend his decision, with Supreme Court President Mandisa Maya asking him directly whether he was "a corrupt judge". Julius Malema, the leader of the EFF and a political appointee to the commission, argued that Ledwaba should have considered Ramaphosa's petition in open court instead of in a closed meeting. After the interviews, the Judicial Service Commission did not nominate Ledwaba for elevation to the Supreme Court.

In late 2019, Ledwaba was selected to receive mediator training in the U.S. as part of South Africa's efforts to improve mediation opportunities via court-annexed processes. His cohort of judges included Nolwazi Mabindla-Boqwana, Thoba Poyo-Dlwati, Glenn Goosen (judge), Raylene Keightley, Norman Davis, and Phineas Mojapelo (ret.). He and his U.S.-trained judge colleagues were involved in the leadership of a national summit and mediation training for S.A. judges in Cape Town in July 2022. Court-annexed mediation was the focus of the meetings. The South African Judicial Education Institute (SAJEI) and several additional judges were prominent in that effort, including former Chief Justice Raymond Zondo and former JPs Dunstan Mlambo and Francis Legodi (ret.), as well as faculty members and mediators from the U.S. -- Judge Ben H. Hadfield (ret.), Nathan D. Alder, Velvet Rodriquez, and Stephen D. Kelson. C.J. Zondo expressed full support of court-based mediation stating that he would "like it to take off as soon as possible."

== Personal life ==
He is married to Nomalanga Rosina Ledwaba and has three children. He is a member of the Adonai Church in Soshanguve.
