= Dunstan Mlambo =

South African judge

The Honourable Dunstan Mlambo

9th Deputy Chief Justice of South Africa
- Incumbent
- Assumed office 1 August 2025
- Nominated by: Judicial Service Commission
- Appointed by: President Cyril Ramaphosa
- Preceded by: Mandisa Maya

Judge President of the Gauteng Division of the High Court of South Africa
- In office 1 November 2012 – 1 August 2025
- Nominated by: Judicial Service Commission
- Appointed by: President Jacob Zuma
- Preceded by: Bernard Ngoepe

Personal details
- Born: September 1959 (age 67) Bushbuckridge, Mpumalanga, South Africa
- Spouse: Cynthia Ramashela
- Children: 4: Nhlanhla, Thulani, Thato, Khutso
- Education: University of the North
- Occupation: Judge
- Profession: Jurist

Dunstan Mlambo (born September 1959) is a South African judge serving as Deputy Chief Justice of South Africa. Formerly Judge President of the Gauteng Division of the High Court of South Africa. Since 2002 he has also served as the chairperson of Legal Aid South Africa which provides legal aid to those who cannot afford it, and is a trustee of the Legal Resources Centre public interest law clinic.

== Early life and education ==
Mlambo was born in Bushbuckridge and grew up in Barberton in Mpumalanga. His father was an apolitical civil servant and his uncle Johnson Mlambo was a political prisoner on Robben Island. After matriculating from Thembeka High School in the KaNyamazane township of Nelspruit in 1979, he studied law at the University of the North where he completed his B.Proc. degree in 1983. In 1987 he was admitted to the fellowship programme of the Legal Resources Centre in Johannesburg, targeted at black law graduates, and in 1990 he was admitted as an attorney.

== Judicial career ==
Mlambo was appointed as an acting judge in the Labour Court and a judge in the Labour Appeal Court in 1997. He subsequently served as a judge in the South Gauteng High Court and the Supreme Court of Appeal. Prior to his appointment as High Court Judge President, he was Judge President of the Labour Court and Labour Appeal Court. During his term of office as Judge President of the Labour Court, he was critical of the practice of labour brokering which deprives employees of labour law protection.

Mlambo was appointed Judge President of the Gauteng Division of the High Court by President Jacob Zuma effective from 1 November 2012, succeeding Bernard Ngoepe. He stated in his CV that he had "devoted his practice of law towards the upliftment and protection of people on the ground as a public interest lawyer and trade union lawyer". During a speech made shortly after he took office, he said he would ensure that "access to justice becomes what it should be". Mlambo was appointed Deputy Chief Justice of the Constitutional Court of South Africa by President Cyril Ramaphosa effective from 1 August 2025, taking over from the acting Deputy Chief Justice Mbuyiseli Madlanga.

Mlambo is credited, along with others, during his court leadership, for the rapid expansion of mediation opportunities via court processes in South Africa. In 2019 he directed that seven judges travel to the United States to receive mediator training, and return with plans for how to develop court-annexed mediation. In July 2022, he and others helped arrange for a mediation summit in Cape Town where a large number of judges from various levels of court were trained in mediation practices, and court-annexed mediation was the focus of attention. The South African Judicial Education Institute (SAJEI) and several judges were prominent in that effort, including former Chief Justice Raymond Zondo, Phineas Mojapelo (ret.), Audrey Ledwaba, Norman Davis, Thoba Poyo-Dlwati, Nolwazi Mabindla-Boqwana, Glenn Goosen, Raylene Keightley, and Francis Legodi (ret.); faculty members and mediators from the U.S. included Judge Ben H. Hadfield (ret.), Nathan D. Alder, Velvet Rodriquez, and Stephen D. Kelson. C.J. Zondo expressed full support of court-based mediation, stating that he would "like it to take off as soon as possible."

== Notable judgements ==
In Multichoice (Proprietary) Limited and Others v National Prosecuting Authority and Another, an application made by eNCA, MultiChoice and Eyewitness News (Primedia) to the High Court in Pretoria to broadcast the proceedings of the Oscar Pistorius murder trial to be held in the court from 3 to 20 March 2014 was opposed by the defence team. On 25 February 2014, Mlambo ruled that the entire trial proceedings may be broadcast live via audio and that parts of the trial may be broadcast live via television, subject to various restrictions to minimise any impact on the trial proceedings. The parts that he permitted to be broadcast audiovisually were the opening and closing arguments, the testimony of consenting state witnesses, the judgement, and the sentencing if applicable. His ruling took into account the right to freedom of expression and the defendant's right to a fair trial. His reasons for allowing live broadcasting of the trial included dispelling perceptions that the rich and famous receive preferential treatment from the justice system, enabling public access to an unedited firsthand account of the trial, and educating the public about criminal proceedings in general. The ruling was welcomed by members of the South African media, who described it as a groundbreaking decision supporting freedom of expression, freedom of the media, open justice and democracy. In a cartoon by Zapiro published in The Times on 27 February 2014, Pistorius is depicted walking a tightrope between the justice system representing the right to a fair trial and the media representing the public's right to know.

In his judgement Mlambo granted ultimate discretion regarding what may be broadcast to the presiding judge in the trial, namely Thokozile Masipa. The trial was interrupted on the second day after it transpired that eNCA was showing a still photograph of a non-consenting state witness onscreen while broadcasting her audio testimony. Masipa subsequently instructed the court that no photographs of any non-consenting witnesses may be used in the media, regardless of the source of the photographs. On 10 March 2014, Masipa ruled that the forensic pathologist's post mortem evidence may not be broadcast live, including verbatim tweeting and blogging, but reversed her ban on live tweeting and blogging the following day.

A state witness was harassed telephonically after his cellphone number was read out in court during cross-examination by the defence team on the second day of the trial.

In his Business Day column published on 13 March 2014, Caxton Professor of Journalism at Wits University Anton Harber stated that the trial represents a turning point for local newspapers unable to compete with "the speed and conversational nature of electronic media". He also notes that the fact that the presiding judge has "her finger on the off button for live broadcast" is restraining the behaviour of the media.
