= Seventeenth Amendment of the Constitution of South Africa =

2012 judicial reforms in South Africa

Constitution Seventeenth Amendment Act of 2012

Parliament of South Africa
- Long title: Act to amend the Constitution of the Republic of South Africa, 1996, so as to further define the role of the Chief Justice as the head of the judiciary; to provide for a single High Court of South Africa; to provide that the Constitutional Court is the highest court in all matters; to further regulate the jurisdiction of the Constitutional Court and the Supreme Court of Appeal; to provide for the appointment of an Acting Deputy Chief Justice; and to provide for matters connected therewith.
- Passed by: National Assembly
- Passed: 20 November 2012
- Assented to: 1 February 2013
- Commenced: 23 August 2013

Legislative history
- Bill title: Constitution Seventeenth Amendment Bill
- Bill citation: B6—2011
- Introduced by: Jeff Radebe, Minister of Justice and Constitutional Development
- Introduced: 2 June 2011

Amends
- Constitution of the Republic of South Africa, 1996

Related legislation
- Superior Courts Act, 2013
- Status: In force

The Seventeenth Amendment of the Constitution of South Africa (formally the Constitution Seventeenth Amendment Act of 2012) made a number of changes to the structure of the South African judiciary. The bill for the amendment was passed by the National Assembly on 20 November 2012 with the required two-thirds majority; because it is a constitutional amendment not affecting the provinces it was not required to be voted on by the National Council of Provinces. The act was signed by President Jacob Zuma on 1 February 2013, and a presidential proclamation brought it into force on 23 August 2013. The amendment came into force simultaneously with the Superior Courts Act, 2013, which implemented a major rationalisation and restructuring of the judicial system.

== Provisions ==
The amendment declares that the Chief Justice is the head of the judiciary and is responsible for administrative oversight of the courts. It allows the appointment of a Constitutional Court judge as acting Deputy Chief Justice (DCJ) if the position is vacant or the DCJ is absent. It expands the jurisdiction of the Constitutional Court so that, as well as constitutional matters, the court will also have jurisdiction over other matters of general public importance that it chooses to hear. It also removes the jurisdiction of the Supreme Court of Appeal over appeals from the Labour Appeal Court and the Competition Appeal Court. It alters references to the High Courts so that they are regarded as divisions of a single High Court of South Africa rather than separate courts.
