= Frikkie =

Frikkie is a given name. Notable people with the name include:

- Frikkie Eloff (1925–2017), South African judge
- Frikkie Spies (born 1985), South African rugby union player
- Frikkie Welsh (born 1978), South African rugby union player
