= Raymond Louw =

South African journalist (1926–2019)

- Born: Raymond Louw; 13 October 1926; Cape Town, South Africa
- Died: 5 June 2019 (aged 92); South Africa
- Occupations: Journalist and editor
- Employer: Rand Daily Mail
- Known for: editorship Rand Daily Mail during the 1960s and 80s
- Spouse: Jean Ramsay Byres
- Children: Fiona, Derek, Alistair

Raymond Louw (13 October 1926 – 5 June 2019) was a South African journalist, editor, and media commentator in South Africa. He was an editor of the influential Rand Daily Mail and received numerous awards and accolades for his services to journalism and media freedom in South Africa. In 2011, he was named a World Press Freedom Hero by the Vienna-based International Press Institute. The award cited his "commitment to press freedom and his outspoken defence of journalists’ rights".

== Early life ==
Born in Cape Town, Union of South Africa, on 13 October 1926, Louw attended Parktown Boys' High School in Johannesburg. After completing his matric, he sat a railway exam and was accepted for an apprenticeship as a mechanical engineer but instead took a job as a copy holder at the Rand Daily Mail. He would apply several time to be a reporter but he claimed was turned down due to his Afrikaner sounding surname even though he was English, so it took two years to become a junior reporter in 1946.

== Career ==
To improve his journalism experience, he left with his wife for six years of work experience in England. There he worked as a reporter on the Worthing Gazette and Barrow Evening News. After he returned to South Africa in 1957, he became the night news editor of the Rand Daily Mail and in 1959, became the news editor of the Sunday Times until 1960 rejoining the Mail. He replaced Laurence Gandar as editor of the Rand Daily Mail in 1965 and was seen an apolitical candidate than the former editor, less likely to offend the government.

In 1974 the board of the Mail attempted to remove him by asking him to chair a committee to implement an electronic editing project but refused. By 1975 he assisted in preventing the South African Associated Newspapers (SAAN) being purchased by government backed buyers which is successful, changed the editorial content of the group. In October 1976 he was fired as editor of the Mail and the board reluctantly appointed as the General Manager of SAAN in 1977. Though given no work for five months, he held the position until 1982 when his position ended during company wide restructuring.

== Later life ==
After his retrenchment in 1982, he continued to maintain an interest in journalism. In 1983, he and his wife started a weekly newsletter, the Southern African Report, a publication they maintained until 2010 when they sold it. On the demise of the Rand Daily Mail in 1985, he attempted to rescue it by seeking new backers and attempting to get the owners to reverse their decision. In 1989, he met the ANC in Lusaka with other journalists and businessmen as part of the Five Freedoms Forum. He headed the Media Defence Trust, an organisation created to assist journalists censored or imprisoned. In 1996, he campaigned for the release of jailed journalists around the world and helped in the release of Pius Njawé and Ali Lmrabet. He was vice president of the South African branch of PEN International. As chair of the New Era Schools Trust, it helped establish non-racial schools. And he helped found the University of Witwatersrand's Media Business Training Foundation which assisted to improve the training of Black business journalists.

== Marriage ==
He met his wife Jean Ramsay Byres, a sister of a colleague at the Rand Daily Mail and they married in 1949.

== Honours ==
He received an honorary doctorate of literature from Rhodes University in 2012 and the same honour from the University of Witwatersrand in 2015. Awards included the Pringle Medal for services to journalism from the SA Society of Journalists. In 2005, received the Media Freedom Award from Media Institute of Southern Africa. In 2007, he received the Mondi-Shanduka Newspaper Lifetime Achiever Award. Louw was awarded the International Press Institute award for Press Freedom Campaigning in 2011, jointly with Daniel Pearl. In 2021, he was bestowed in the Gold Order of Ikhamanga posthumously "For his enormous contribution to the field of journalism, and using the pen as his weapon to expose lies and shine the light on the atrocities of apartheid."

== Death ==
He died on 5 June 2019 at the age of 92 of a heart attack after recovering from an operation for a kidney infection. His wife Jean died the day before, following an operation after breaking her hip in a fall a week earlier. He is survived by daughter Fiona Ramsay and son Derek Louw.
