= Superior Courts Act, 2013 =

South African law on the structure of the judicial system

Parliament of South Africa
- Long title: Act to rationalise, consolidate and amend the laws relating to the Constitutional Court, the Supreme Court of Appeal and the High Court of South Africa; to make provision for the administration of the judicial functions of all courts; to make provision for administrative and budgetary matters relating to the Superior Courts; and to provide for matters incidental thereto.
- Citation: Act No. 10 of 2013
- Territorial extent: Republic of South Africa
- Passed by: National Assembly
- Passed: 22 November 2012
- Passed by: National Council of Provinces
- Passed: 14 May 2013
- Assented to: 12 August 2013
- Commenced: 23 August 2013
- Administered by: Department of Justice and Constitutional Development

Legislative history

First chamber: National Assembly
- Bill title: Superior Courts Bill
- Bill citation: B7—2011
- Introduced by: Jeff Radebe, Minister of Justice and Constitutional Development
- Introduced: 2 June 2011

Related legislation
- Constitution Seventeenth Amendment Act of 2012
- Status: In force

The Superior Courts Act, 2013 (Act No. 10 of 2013) is an act of the Parliament of South Africa that restructured the court system. It reorganised the various High Courts into a single High Court of South Africa, with a division situated in each province, including two new divisions to serve Limpopo and Mpumalanga. It rationalised and consolidated the laws governing the superior courts (the Constitutional Court, the Supreme Court of Appeal and the High Court), and altered the administration and financial management of the courts. The act was signed into law on 12 August 2013, and came into force on 23 August. It is associated with the Constitution Seventeenth Amendment Act of 2012, which makes corresponding necessary changes to the Constitution.

== History ==
Transitional provisions in the 1996 Constitution require that the court system be rationalised to suit the new constitution "as soon as practical". The Superior Courts Bill was first introduced in 2003, but it was opposed by members of the judiciary and the legal profession, as well as by opposition politicians, because they claimed that it weakened the independence of the judiciary by putting the administration of the courts under the control of the Minister of Justice. The bill was ultimately allowed to lapse in 2009. In the meantime, the "Interim Rationalisation of Jurisdiction of High Courts Act" and the "Renaming of High Courts Act" were passed to allow the High Courts to be renamed and their areas of jurisdiction to be altered.

The Superior Courts Bill was reintroduced in 2010, but this new version made the Chief Justice, rather than the Minister of Justice, responsible for the administration of the courts, allaying the fears about judicial independence. The new version of the bill was supported by the official opposition Democratic Alliance. The bill did encounter substantial opposition from interested parties in Grahamstown, because it originally proposed that the main seat of the Eastern Cape Division should be moved to Bhisho; this change was ultimately reversed and the main seat will remain at Grahamstown.

The bill was passed by the National Assembly on 22 November 2012 and by the National Council of Provinces on 14 May 2013. It was signed into law by President Jacob Zuma on 12 August 2013, and brought into force by presidential proclamation on 23 August.

== Provisions ==
The act restructured the High Courts into Divisions of a single High Court as described in the following table. In each division, if there was more than one existing court, one became the main seat with jurisdiction over the whole province, and the others became local seats with jurisdiction over a restricted area.

Previous court	New division
Eastern Cape High Court, Bhisho	Eastern Cape Division (main seat at Grahamstown)
Eastern Cape High Court, Grahamstown	Eastern Cape Division (main seat at Grahamstown)
Eastern Cape High Court, Mthatha	Eastern Cape Division (main seat at Grahamstown)
Eastern Cape High Court, Port Elizabeth	Eastern Cape Division (main seat at Grahamstown)
Free State High Court, Bloemfontein	Free State Division
North Gauteng High Court, Pretoria	Gauteng Division (main seat at Pretoria)
South Gauteng High Court, Johannesburg	Gauteng Division (main seat at Pretoria)
KwaZulu-Natal High Court, Durban	KwaZulu-Natal Division (main seat at Pietermaritzburg)
KwaZulu-Natal High Court, Pietermaritzburg	KwaZulu-Natal Division (main seat at Pietermaritzburg)
New court to be created at Polokwane	Limpopo Division (main seat at Polokwane)
Limpopo High Court, Thohoyandou	Limpopo Division (main seat at Polokwane)
New court to be created at Mbombela	Mpumalanga Division
Northern Cape High Court, Kimberley	Northern Cape Division
North West High Court, Mahikeng	North West Division
Western Cape High Court, Cape Town	Western Cape Division

The Gauteng Division at Pretoria was to also serve as the Limpopo and Mpumalanga Divisions until the new courts are opened at Polokwane and Mbombela (Nelspruit). The Limpopo Division at Polokwane was opened on 25 January 2016, and the Mpumalanga Division at Mbombela was established on 13 May 2019.
