= Nolwazi Mabindla-Boqwana =

South African judge (born 1973)

The Honourable Nolwazi Mabindla-Boqwana

Judge of the Supreme Court of Appeal
- Incumbent
- Assumed office 1 July 2021
- Appointed by: Cyril Ramaphosa

Judge of the Competition Appeal Court
- Incumbent
- Assumed office 20 January 2017

Judge of the High Court
- In office 2 December 2013 – 30 June 2021
- Appointed by: Jacob Zuma
- Division: Western Cape

Personal details
- Born: 13 January 1973 (age 53) Humansdorp, Eastern Cape, South Africa
- Education: University of the Witwatersrand

Nolwazi Penelope Mabindla-Boqwana (born 13 January 1973) is a South African judge of the Supreme Court of Appeal. Before she joined the Supreme Court in July 2021, she was a judge in the Western Cape High Court between 2013 and 2021. She has additionally served on the Competition Appeal Court since January 2017. Before entering the judiciary, she practiced as an attorney in Johannesburg with a specialty in labour law.

== Early life and education ==
Mabindla-Boqwana was born on 13 January 1973 in Humansdorp in the Eastern Cape. She matriculated at Khwezi Lomso Comprehensive School in Port Elizabeth and attended the University of the Witwatersrand, where she completed a BProc in 1996 and an LLB in 1998. Later, in 2002, she completed a management development programme at the Gordon Institute of Business Science in Johannesburg.

== Career as an attorney ==
After completing her articles of clerkship at Deneys Reitz in Johannesburg, Mabindla-Boqwana was admitted as an attorney of the High Court of South Africa in September 1998. She went on to a brief stint as an attorney at Sampson Okes Higgins in Sandton between 1998 and 1999 before, in 2000, she began a five-year stint as internal counsel for labour law at AngloGold Ashanti; in the latter capacity, she also represented AngloGold Ashanti at the Chamber of Mines.

Between 2005 and 2007, Mabindla-Boqwana took a hiatus from legal practice to run two businesses, Nolwazi Investment Holdings (trading as Lwazi Consulting) and Hluma Business and Labour Services. She returned to law in 2008 as a director at Thipa Incorporated Attorneys, where she worked for the next five years, still focusing on labour law. In her later years at Thipa, she accepted acting positions in the judiciary: she was an acting judge in the Labour Court on three occasions between October 2011 and December 2012, and after that she was an acting judge in the Western Cape High Court on four occasions throughout 2013.

== Western Cape High Court: 2013–2021 ==
In October 2013, Mabindla-Boqwana was one of four candidates shortlisted and interviewed for a single permanent position on the Western Cape High Court. After the interviews, the Judicial Service Commission recommended Mabindla-Boqwana for appointment, and President Jacob Zuma appointed her to the position with effect from 2 December 2013. Among other influential decisions, Mabindla-Boqwana wrote the court's majority opinion in a judgment which ordered the government to recognise and regulate Islamic marriages; the decision was upheld by the Supreme Court of Appeal and ultimately by the Constitutional Court in Women's Legal Centre Trust v President. Also largely affirmed by the Constitutional Court was Mabindla-Boqwana's decision in Sonke Gender Justice v President, which declared that certain provisions of the Correctional Services Act were unconstitutional insofar as they failed to provide for the independence of the Judicial Inspectorate for Correctional Services.

During the same period, Mabindla-Boqwana served as an acting judge in the Competition Appeal Court between 2015 and 2016. After a brief but successful interview in October 2016, she was permanently appointed as a judge of the Competition Appeal Court in January 2017. In addition, she served as an acting judge in the Supreme Court of Appeal on four occasions between April 2020 and June 2021. In that capacity, she wrote the unanimous judgement (written in both Xhosa and English) in which the Supreme Court dismissed politician Andile Lungisa's appeal against his sentencing for assault.

In the fall of 2019, Mabindla-Boqwana was selected to receive mediator training in the U.S. as part of South Africa's efforts to improve mediation opportunities via court-annexed processes. Her cohort of judges included Audrey Ledwaba, Thoba Poyo-Dlwati, Glenn Goosen (judge), Raylene Keightley, Norman Davis, and Phineas Mojapelo (ret.). She and her U.S. trained judge colleagues were involved in the leadership of a national summit and mediation training for S.A. judges in Cape Town in July 2022. Court-annexed mediation was the focus of the meetings. The South African Judicial Education Institute (SAJEI) and several additional judges were prominent in that effort, including former Chief Justice Raymond Zondo and Francis Legodi (ret.), as well as faculty members and mediators from the U.S.--Judge Ben H. Hadfield (ret.), Nathan D. Alder, Velvet Rodriquez, and Stephen D. Kelson. C.J. Zondo expressed full support of court-based mediation stating that he would "like it to take off as soon as possible."

== Supreme Court of Appeal: 2021–present ==
In February 2021, Mabindla-Boqwana was shortlisted for permanent promotion to one of five vacancies in the Supreme Court of Appeal. After she was interviewed in April, the Judicial Service Commission recommended her appointment, and she joined the Supreme Court bench on 1 July 2021.

In June 2022, the Office of the Chief Justice warned the public that somebody impersonating Mabindla-Boqwana had contacted several people and entities to request private and sensitive information.
