= Laurence Gandar =

South African journalist (1915–1998)

Laurence Owen Vine Gandar
- Born: 28 January 1915; Durban, South Africa
- Died: 15 November 1998 (aged 83); Pietermaritzburg, South Africa
- Education: Bachelor of Arts; University of Natal
- Occupations: Journalist and editor
- Employer: Rand Daily Mail
- Known for: editorship Rand Daily Mail during the 1950s and 60s
- Spouse: Isobel Blanche Carnegie Ballance
- Children: Son
- Relatives: Owen Vine Gandar; Sally Gandar

Laurence Owen Vine Gandar (28 January 1915 – 15 November 1998) was a South African journalist and newspaper editor. He is best known as an editor of South African newspaper The Rand Daily Mail.

== Early life ==
Laurence Gandar was born on 28 January 1915 in Durban, Natal, South Africa. After high school, he attended the University of Natal and obtained a Bachelor of Arts. He would represent the province of Natal in hurdles and long jump. After university, he started work as a journalist on a local paper. When war broke out in 1939, he enlisted in the Union Defence Force and rose from the rank of corporal to captain, becoming the Brigade Intelligence Officer in the 6th South African Armoured Division in Italy. He would marry his wife Isobel Ballance in 1944.

== Career ==
After the war he returned to journalism in Durban with the Argus Newspaper group and would eventually become an assistant editor. He would leave the newspaper in 1953, describing it as 'spineless', and joined the Anglo American Corporation in their public relations department working as an editor for their publication, the Optima.

In October 1957, he was offered the role of editor of the Rand Daily Mail, one of many English South African newspapers owned by Anglo American. He would change the editorial style of the newspaper to a liberal tone, which was in opposition to the views most white people, and would inform South Africans about the racial and human rights abuses of apartheid and challenged the ruling Afrikaner National Party government. He would also challenge the white opposition parties for their lack of firm opposition to Apartheid. His change in editorial style would have a negative effect on circulation in the mid-60s, falling to 112,000 from 125,000 readers and would continue until the papers demise in 1985. In 1959, it was instrumental in persuading liberals to break away from the white opposition United Party and form the Progressive Party and would later assist the new party's only MP, Helen Suzman to be elected in 1961. In a 1963 editorial he would write the following concerning the future South Africa had,

'There are two choices and only two. There is racial separation, with massive economic sacrifices - or there is economic integration, with far-reaching political concessions. There is no middle course. At present we are trying to get the best of both worlds, and it is killing us.'

During June and July 1965, he and journalist Benjamin Pogrund wrote a series of articles on conditions in South African prisons for black South Africans in Port Elizabeth, Pretoria and the Cinderella Prison in Boksburg based on interviews with prison officials and prisoners. The articles cited assaults on prisoners, sodomy and unhygienic conditions in these prisons. The Prison Act, 1959 forbade newspapers from discussing conditions in prisons, forbidding interviews with prisoners, ex-prisoners, and administrators of the facilities, with a possible prison sentence of one year for breaching the act if in defense one could not prove the allegations in court.

During this period the newspaper was subjected to around the clock surveillance, Security Branch raids, the eavesdropping of the editor, journalists and the newsroom as well as infiltration by police informants and the intimidations and prosecution of informants. The attacks against the newspaper were also taken up by the government controlled South African Broadcasting Corporation (SABC) and the Afrikaner newspapers and silence from the English newspapers. On 22 August 1965, he was visited at home and had his passport confiscated and the same would happen to Pogrund. The government would instead of investigating the claims through the means of a judicial inquiry, prosecute two prisoners and two wardens sentencing one to three years in jail, 'confessing' to making up the charges and being a paid informant of the paper, a claim that the Rand Daily Mail was not allowed to challenge at his trial.

They would be charged with contravening South Africa's Prisons Act and would eventually appear in court in November 1968, before Justice P. M. Cillié, in a trial that last 88 days. The prosecution would successfully argue that 17 allegations in the articles were false and the judge agreed finding the two guilty on two charges of publishing false allegations and not 'verifying' the facts. Gandar was fined R100 on both charges or three months imprisonment and Pogrund received two three-month sentences suspended for three years and subject to him not contravening the Prison Act.

In 1965 he was fired as editor of the Rand Daily Mail by it board of directors because of poor circulation figures but after a threatened walk-out by the senior journalists, Gandar was appointed as editor-in-chief and Raymond Louw appointed as the new editor. Gander would remain in his new role until 1969. Gandar was appointed the first director of the Minority Rights Group in Britain which investigated and publicized the treatment of the worlds minorities, a position that lasted three years and afterwards returned to South Africa.

== Honours ==
Gandar won a Kemsley Empire Journalist Scholarship and would spend a year in Britain. In 1974, Gandar was awarded an honorary doctorate by the University of the Witwatersrand and in 1990 he was awarded an honorary doctorate by the University of Natal. In 2010, he was honoured with a posthumous award as a World Press Freedom Hero from the International Press Institute. Other awards include a gold medal award by the British Institute of Journalists and a World Press Achievement Award in 1966 for his newspaper from the American Newspaper Publishers Association.

== Death ==
He retired to the south coast of Natal and played golf and invested in the stock-market. His wife Isobel died in 1989. His son Mark died in 1998, and is survived by his wife Jenny, his step daughters, Collette and Sally, and his son Owen. Laurence Gandar died in Pietermaritzburg, KwaZulu-Natal South Africa on 15 November 1998 shortly after the death of his son, and after several years of illness, from Parkinson's disease.
