= P. M. Cillié =

South African judge

The Honourable P. M. Cillié QC

Judge of the Appellate Division
- In office 1980–1985

Judge President of the Transvaal Provincial Division of the Supreme Court of South Africa
- In office 1969–1979
- Preceded by: Quartus de Wet
- Succeeded by: W. G. Boshoff

Judge of the Transvaal Provincial Division of the Supreme Court of South Africa
- In office 1955–1969

Personal details
- Born: Petrus Malan Cillié; 20 August 1915 Brandfort, Orange Free State, Union of South Africa
- Died: 20 October 1996 (aged 81) Randburg, Gauteng, South Africa
- Citizenship: South African citizenship
- Education: University of the Witwatersrand; Cambridge University
- Profession: Advocate

Petrus Malan Cillié QC (20 August 1915 – 20 October 1996) was a South African jurist, Judge President of the Transvaal Provincial Division of the Supreme Court of South Africa and Judge of Appeal.

== Early life and education ==
Cillié was born in Brandfort, in the Orange Free State province. He spent his childhood in Johannesburg and matriculated from Helpmekaar High School in Johannesburg. He enrolled for a BA degree in Law at the University of the Witwatersrand in 1932. After completing his LLB at University of the Witwatersrand, he went to England and completed his LLM degree in Law at Cambridge University. He passed his Tripos exam with a second-class average.

== Career ==
Cillié joined the Johannesburg bar in 1938, but did not immediately start practising as an advocate. He first worked as a broadcaster at the South African Broadcasting Corporation for a time, having gained experience with the SABC's British counterpart.

He first started practising as an advocate in 1942 and in the same year, he was part of the legal team that defended Robey Leibbrandt in his trial on charges of high treason. Cillié became Queen's Counsel in 1955 and was also appointed judge in 1955. On 10 March 1969 he succeeded Judge Quartus de Wet as judge president in the Transvaal Provincial Division of the Supreme Court of South Africa. In 1980 he was elevated to judge op the Appellate Division.

Cillié was also regularly appointed chair of commissions of inquiry. He first led a commission in 1956, investigating the state of hospitals in the Transvaal province. He then was part of commissions dealing with border demarcation issues. In 1976, he chaired the commission of inquiry into the Soweto uprising and in 1990, he chaired the commission of inquiry into the high infant mortality rate in Ga-Rankuwa's hospitals.

== Notable cases ==
In 1975, Cillié was the presiding judge in the high treason trial of the Afrikaans poet Breyten Breytenbach. Breytenbach was convicted and sent to prison for nine years. Cillié was also the judge in the case against Gonville ffrench-Beytagh, dean of the Anglican church in Johannesburg, who was charged with assistance he provided to the ANC.

Cases against the press were also handled by Cillié. He is remembered for the case against The Rand Daily Mail editor Laurence Gandar and senior reporter Benjamin Pogrund about false publications on the state of South African prisons. Both accused were convicted on two charges of publishing false allegations and not 'verifying' the facts. Gandar was fined R100 on both charges and Pogrund received two three-month suspended sentences.

== Other involvement ==
He was appointed as the State President's elected candidate on the board of the University of the Witwatersrand from 1959 to 1973. He was also a member of the Faculty of Law at the University of the Witwatersrand. During the same period, until before his death in 1996, he served on the Transvaal Rugby Union's disciplinary committee.

== See also ==
- List of Judges President of the Gauteng Division of the High Court of South Africa
