= H. H. Moll =

South African judge

The Honourable H. H. Moll

Judge President of the Transvaal Provincial Division of the Supreme Court of South Africa
- In office 1985–1991
- Preceded by: W. G. Boshoff
- Succeeded by: Frikkie Eloff

Judge of the Transvaal Provincial Division of the Supreme Court of South Africa
- In office 1971–1985

Personal details
- Born: Henry Harris Moll; 19 March 1921 Pretoria, Union of South African
- Died: 16 May 2003 (aged 82) Pretoria, South Africa
- Profession: Advocate

Henry Harris Moll (19 March 1921 – 16 May 2003) was a South African judge who served as Judge President of the Transvaal Provincial Division of the Supreme Court of South Africa from 1985 until 1991.

== See also ==
- List of Judges President of the Gauteng Division of the High Court of South Africa
