= W. G. Boshoff =

South African judge

The Honourable W. G. Boshoff QC

Judge of the Appellate Division
- In office 1985–1986

Judge President of the Transvaal Provincial Division of the Supreme Court of South Africa
- In office 1976–1985
- Preceded by: P. M. Cillié
- Succeeded by: H. H. Moll

Judge of the Transvaal Provincial Division of the Supreme Court of South Africa
- In office 1957–1976

Personal details
- Born: Wessel Groenewald Boshoff; 15 May 1916 Amersfoort, Transvaal, Union of South Africa
- Died: 22 March 1989 (aged 72) Pretoria, Transvaal South Africa
- Citizenship: South African citizenship
- Education: University of Pretoria
- Profession: Advocate

Wessel Groenewald Boshoff QC (15 May 1916 – 22 March 1989) was a South African judge, Judge President of the Transvaal Provincial Division of the Supreme Court of South Africa and Judge of Appeal.

== Early life and education ==
Boshoff was born in Amersfoort in the Transvaal Province of the Union of South Africa. He received his schooling at Pretoria Boys High School and at Selborne College in East London. After school he studied law at the University of Pretoria, where he obtained the degrees BA and LLB.

== Career ==
Boshoff practised at the Pretoria Bar from 1940 until 1957. In 1957, he became a puisne judge of the Transvaal Provincial Division of the Supreme Court of South Africa, and in 1976, was appointed Judge President of the Transvaal Division. In 1985, he was elevated to the Supreme Court of South Africa, where he served as appeal judge until his retirement.

== Notable cases ==
Boshoff was the presiding judge in the so-called Little Rivonia Trial, in which several members of the armed resistance organization Umkhonto we Sizwe faced charges of sabotage. In 1985, Boshoff ordered the South African Medical and Dental Council to hold an inquiry into the conduct of the two doctors who treated Steve Biko during the five days before he died, as he found that there was prima facie evidence of misconduct by the doctors.

== See also ==
- List of Judges President of the Gauteng Division of the High Court of South Africa
