= Kosovo Property Agency =

Administrative agency in Kosovo

The Kosovo Property Agency (KPA) was established on 4 March 2006 under United Nations Interim Administration Mission in Kosovo (UNMIK) Regulation 2006/10, as an administrative agency functioning independently pursuant to Chapter 11.2 of the Constitutional Framework of Kosovo. It is mandated under UNMIK Regulation 2006/50 to resolve the resolution of claims resulting from the armed conflict that occurred between 27 February 1998 and 20 June 1999 in respect of private immovable property, including agricultural and commercial property - and has three main functions; (a) receive, register and resolve specific claims on private immovable property; (b) enforcement of legally final decisions; and (c) administration of abandoned properties. The KPA has, subject to appeal to the Supreme Court of Kosovo, exclusive jurisdiction to resolve the claims for private immovable property resulting from the conflict period specified above.

Under the Regulation, the staff and assets of the Housing and Property Directorate is subsumed into the KPA. The KPA therefore assumes responsibility for the implementation of all residential property claims that were pending with the HPD on 4 March 2006 and it will ensure their resolution in an effective and expeditious manner. Further, the Housing and Property Claims Commission (HPCC) will continue to decide the limited number of remaining residential claims that are currently pending before it.

The Housing and Property Directorate (HPD) and its Housing and Property Claims Commission (HPCC) were originally established by UNMIK regulation 1999/23 on 15 November 1999 to regularize all individual conflict-related housing and property claims.

== See also ==
- UNMIK

== Sources and external links ==
- A. Dodson, V. Heiskanen, Housing and Property Restitution in Kosovo, in: S. Leckie, Returning Home: Housing and Property Rights of Refugees and Displaced Persons, 2003, S. 225 ff. ISBN 1-57105-241-0
- K. Hassine, Housing and Property Directorate/Claims Commission in Kosovo, Eine Studie zur Modellwirkung von HPD/CC für den internationalen Eigentumsschutz Privater – Mit einem Vorwort von Dr. Veijo Heiskanen, Studienreihe des Ludwig Boltzmann Instituts für Menschenrechte, Band 21, Neuer Wissenschaftlicher Verlag 2009. ISBN 978-3-7083-0620-9
- K. Hassine, Regularizing Property Rights in Kosovo & Elsewhere – COHRE's impact as non-State actor for the international protection of housing, land and property rights, Annex: Proposals for Claims Commissions, February 2010. ISBN 978-3-86553-340-1
