= Independent Regulatory Board for Auditors =

Statutory body

The Independent Regulatory Board for Auditors (IRBA), formerly known as Public Accountants and Auditors Board (PAAB), is a statutory body controlling public accountancy in the Republic of South Africa.

The designation conferred by IRBA is Registered Auditor (RA). Following qualification, accountants entering into public practice are required to register with IRBA and are governed by its regulations.

IRBA functions under the Auditing Profession Act, 2005 (Act 26 of 2005). Its members are appointed by the Minister of Finance. The Board consists of not less than six but not more than 10 members and, disregarding any vacancy in its membership, not more than 40% of the members of the Board may be registered auditors.
