= David Unterhalter =

South African judge

The Honourable David Unterhalter

Judge of the Supreme Court of Appeal
- Incumbent
- Assumed office 1 July 2024
- Appointed by: Cyril Ramaphosa

Judge of the High Court
- In office 1 January 2018 – 30 June 2024
- Appointed by: Jacob Zuma
- Division: Gauteng

Personal details
- Born: 18 November 1958 (age 67) Johannesburg, Transvaal; Union of South Africa
- Parent: Jack Unterhalter
- Education: Trinity College, Cambridge; University of the Witwatersrand; University College, Oxford

David Unterhalter (born 18 November 1958) is a South African jurist and judge of the Supreme Court of Appeal of South Africa. He is also professor of law at the University of Cape Town. Before he was appointed to the bench of the Gauteng High Court in January 2018, Unterhalter was a prominent advocate, specialising in public law, competition law, and trade law. He was called to the Johannesburg Bar in 1990 and took silk in 2002.

== Early life and education ==
Unterhalter was born on 18 November 1958 in Johannesburg. His father was Jack Unterhalter, a lawyer who attained public prominence representing political prisoners during apartheid. Unterhalter attended Trinity College, Cambridge, where he completed a BA in 1980, converted to an MA in 1987. He went on to an LLB at the University of the Witwatersrand in 1984 and a BCL at University College, Oxford in 1985.

== Legal practice ==
Unterhalter was admitted as an advocate of the Supreme Court of South Africa in 1990. He practised as an advocate at the Johannesburg Bar for the next 27 years, taking silk in 2002. He argued several high-profile cases in the Supreme Court of Appeal and Constitutional Court, including Democratic Alliance v President, on Menzi Simelane's appointment to the National Prosecuting Authority; Eisenberg v Minister of Home Affairs, on the constitutionality of immigration regulations; S v Jordan, on the criminalisation of prostitution; Glenister v President, on the disbanding of the Scorpions; Islamic Unity Convention v Minister of Telecommunications, a hate speech case; and My Vote Counts v Speaker, on political party funding. He also represented Deputy President Cyril Ramaphosa during Ian Farlam's commission of inquiry into the Marikana massacre. In 2010, when the senate of the University of Johannesburg considered a motion to sever its ties to Ben Gurion University as part of an academic boycott of Israel, Unterhalter appeared pro bono for Ben Gurion University.

While remaining a member of the Johannesburg Bar, Unterhalter was called to the English Bar in 2009 and joined Monckton Chambers at Gray's Inn. He was a member of the Appellate Body of the World Trade Organization between 2007 and 2013, serving as its chairperson from 2010 to 2011; and, on several occasions from 2003 onwards, he served as an acting judge in the Gauteng Division of the High Court of South Africa.

== Gauteng High Court: 2018–2024 ==
In October 2017, the Judicial Service Commission interviewed Unterhalter and recommended him as suitable for permanent appointment to the Gauteng High Court. The following month, President Jacob Zuma confirmed his appointment, which took effect on 1 January 2018. Later that year, he was seconded as an acting judge to the Competition Appeal Court, where he served between June 2018 and December 2021. In addition, he has served several stints as an acting judge in higher courts: in the Constitutional Court for two terms in 2022, and in the Supreme Court of Appeal on nine occasions between 2020 and 2024.

On several occasions, Unterhalter was shortlisted for appointment to higher courts. He interviewed unsuccessfully for vacancies at the Constitutional Court in April 2021, October 2021, and April 2022; and he interviewed unsuccessfully for a vacancy at the Supreme Court of Appeal in October 2023. In the 2021 rounds, members of the Judicial Service Commission argued with Unterhalter over his association with the South African Jewish Board of Deputies, a conservative and generally pro-Zionist organisation; he had been appointed to the board's executive committee in 2020. In the 2022 and 2023 rounds, his interviews were diverted by rigorous debate with commissioners over his failure to recuse himself from the Constitutional Court quorum in Ken Lindeque v Eskom Holdings v Mogale City Local Municipality, a matter which he had heard earlier while acting in the Supreme Court of Appeal. In addition, he was questioned on several occasions about the strength of his record in leading black female junior counsel while at the bar. The Judicial Service Commission's repeated omission to recommend Unterhalter for elevation was often controversial and was criticised by Freedom Under Law, by the Council for the Advancement of the South African Constitution, by the Jewish Board of Deputies, and by various commentators.

== Supreme Court of Appeal: 2024–present ==
In May 2024, following another interview, the Judicial Service Commission recommended Unterhalter for elevation to the Supreme Court of Appeal. After his appointment was confirmed by President Cyril Ramaphosa, he joined the bench on 1 July 2024.

== Academic appointments ==
Between 2007 and 2013, Unterhalter was a professor of law at the University of the Witwatersrand, where he formerly led the Centre for Applied Legal Studies. Since 2014, he has been a professor of law at the University of Cape Town. He has published in public law, trade law, and competition law.

== Personal life ==
Unterhalter is Jewish, and he was a member of the Democratic Party between 1989 and 1994. He was a member of the Helen Suzman Foundation before he joined the bench.
