= Nolwazi Hlabangane =

South African rugby player (born 1995)

- Born: 7 June 1995 (age 31)
- Height: 1.6 m (5 ft 3 in)
- Weight: 60 kg (132 lb)

Rugby union career
National sevens team
Years	Team	Comps
	South Africa	6

Nolwazi Hlabangane (born 7 June 1995) is a South African rugby sevens player. She competed for South Africa at the 2022 Rugby World Cup Sevens in Cape Town.
