= Bernard Ngoepe =

South African academic administrator

The Honourable Bernard Ngoepe SC
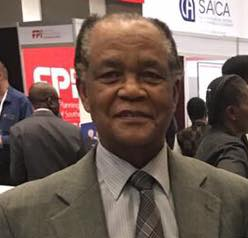
- Ngoepe in 2017

Judge President of the North Gauteng High Court
- In office 1998–2012
- Preceded by: Frikkie Eloff
- Succeeded by: Dunstan Mlambo

Chancellor of the University of South Africa
- In office 18 September 2011 – 8 December 2016
- Preceded by: Christoph Friedrich Garbers
- Succeeded by: Thabo Mbeki

Tax Ombudsman of South Africa
- Incumbent
- Assumed office 2013
- Preceded by: None

Judge of the Transvaal Provincial Division of the Supreme Court of South Africa
- In office 1995–1998

Personal details
- Born: Bernard Makgabo Ngoepe; 22 October 1947 (age 78) Pietersburg, Union of South Afrika
- Education: University of the North; University of South Africa
- Occupation: Judge
- Profession: Lawyer

Judge Bernard Makgabo Ngoepe SC (born 22 October 1947) is a South African Judge serving as Tax Ombudsman of South Africa since 2013. He was the Chancellor of the University of South Africa from 2011 to 2016.

== Early life and education ==
Ngoepe was born in Pietersburg and matriculated at Hebron Institute in Pretoria North in 1967. After school he obtained a BIuris from the University of the North in 1972 and an LL.B. degree from Unisa.

== Career ==
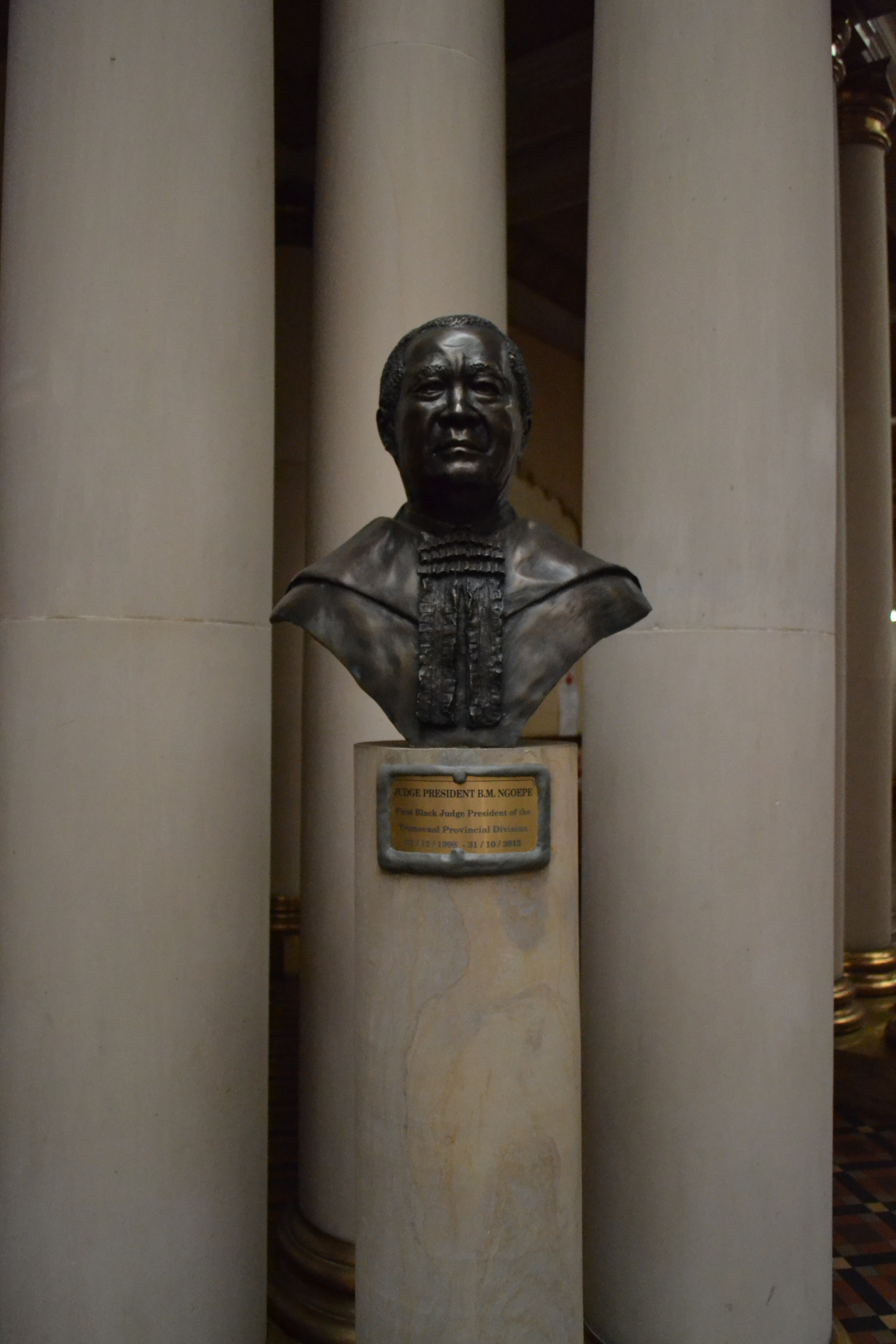
Bust of Judge Ngoepe at the Palace of Justice

Ngoepe was admitted as an attorney and practised as such for seven years before being admitted as an advocate in 1983. In 1984 he joined the Pretoria Bar and in November 1994, he took silk. He received his first acting position as Judge of the Transvaal Provincial Division for the period February 1995 to June 1995. He was permanently appointed to the Bench in the Transvaal Provincial Division in July 1995.

Ngoepe served as an Acting judge of the Constitutional Court of South Africa from 15 August 1995 to the end of September 1995. He was also the Chancellor of the University of South Africa (Unisa) until December 2016

In 2013, Ngoepe was appointed as the first Tax Ombudsman of South Africa. In September 2016, the South African Treasury extended Judge Ngoepe's term of office as the Tax Ombudsman for a further three years.

== Other Positions Held ==
- Tax Ombud of South Africa (first term 2013 to 2016) (extended for a second three year term in 2016)
- Judge of the African Union's African Court on Human and Peoples' Rights from 2006 to 2014
- Chancellor, University of South Africa
- Chairperson, Magistrates’ Commission
- Member, United Nations Environment Programme Global Alliance of Judges on Environmental Law and participant in the United Nations Environment Programme Global Judges Programme Initiatives
- Member, Court of Military Appeals
- Chairperson, Military Legal Services Division Review Council
- Military Appeals. Judge President, Transvaal Provincial Division of the High Court of South Africa
- Acting Judge, Supreme Court of Appeal in Bloemfontein
- Member, Truth and Reconciliation Commission Amnesty Committee
- Acting Judge, Constitutional Court of South Africa (1995)
- Judge, Transvaal Provincial Division of the High Court of South Africa
- Member, Technical Committee on Constitutional Issues (the Committee drafted the Constitution)
- Senior Counsel, High Court of South Africa
- Advocate, High Court of South Africa
- Founding Member, Black Lawyers Association
- Private Practice (1976–1983)

== Publications and writings ==
- Final report: Commission of Inquiry into the Ellis Park Stadium Soccer Disaster of 11 April 2001.(2002)

== Awards ==
South African Human Rights Award
