= Frikkie Eloff =

South African judge

The Honourable Frikkie Eloff SC

Judge President of the Transvaal Provincial Division of the Supreme Court of South Africa
- In office 1991–1998
- Preceded by: H. H. Moll
- Succeeded by: Bernard Ngoepe

Deputy Judge President of the Transvaal Provincial Division of the Supreme Court of South Africa
- In office 1985–1991
- Preceded by: New position
- Succeeded by: D. J. Curlewis

Judge of the Transvaal Provincial Division of the Supreme Court of South Africa
- In office 1973–1985

Personal details
- Born: Christoffel Frederik Eloff; 31 January 1925 Pretoria, Transvaal, Union of South Africa
- Died: 10 December 2017 (aged 92) Pretoria, Gauteng, South Africa
- Education: University of Pretoria
- Profession: Advocate

Christoffel Frederik "Frikkie" Eloff SC (31 January 1925 – 10 December 2017) was a South African judge who served as Judge President of the Transvaal Provincial Division of the Supreme Court of South Africa from 1991 until 1998.

== Early life and education ==
Eloff, was born in Pretoria in 1925 and was taken to England at a young age, where he attended boarding school in Bexhill. He returned to South Africa and matriculated in Pretoria in 1941. After school he started studying part-time at the University of Pretoria and obtained his BA and LLB degrees.

== Career ==
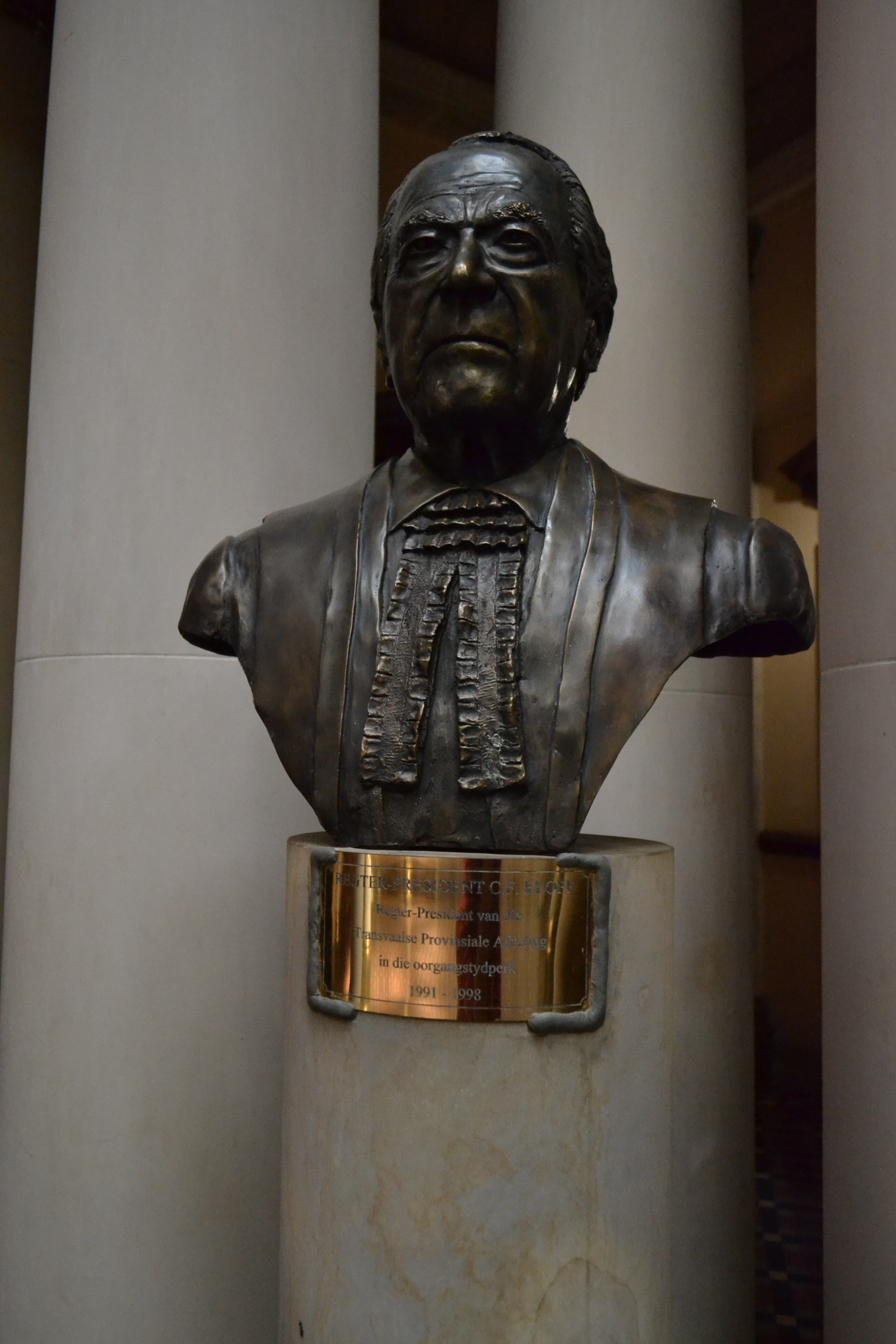
Bust of Judge Eloff at the Palace of Justice

Eloff was admitted as an advocate and called to the Pretoria Bar at the age of 22 in 1947. He took silk as a Senior Counsel in 1965 and was first appointed as an acting judge in 1967. In 1973, he became a permanent judge at Transvaal Provincial Division of the Supreme Court of South Africa. He served as an acting judge of appeal during 1984 and in 1985, he became Deputy Judge President of the Transvaal Provincial Division. In 1991 he was appointed the Judge President of the Transvaal Division, a post he had held until 1998.

== Notable cases ==
In 1996, Eloff was the presiding judge in the divorce trial of Nelson Mandela and Winnie Madikizela-Mandela. A few years earlier he was the judge in the Chris Hani murder trial. He sentenced both Janusz Waluś and Clive Derby-Lewis to death, the sentences were later commuted to a life in prison.

== Honours and awards ==
The University of Pretoria conferred an honorary LLD upon Eloff in 1996 and in the same year, he was appointed as the President of the Convocation of the university. In 2007, Eloff was honoured with a statue at the Palace of Justice in Pretoria.

== See also ==
- List of Judges President of the Gauteng Division of the High Court of South Africa
