= Frans Legodi =

South African judge (born 1954)

Judge President of the Mpumalanga High Court
- In office 1 August 2017 – 21 August 2023
- Appointed by: Jacob Zuma
- Deputy: Segopotje Mphahlele
- Preceded by: Division established
- Succeeded by: Segopotje Mphahlele

Judge of the High Court
- In office 1 October 2004 – 31 July 2017
- Appointed by: Thabo Mbeki
- Division: Gauteng

Personal details
- Born: Malesela Francis Legodi; 9 July 1954 (age 72) Ga-Maphoto, Transvaal; Union of South Africa
- Education: University of the North

Malesela Francis Legodi (born 9 July 1954) is a South African retired judge of the High Court of South Africa. He was the first Judge President of the Mpumalanga Division of the High Court from August 2017 to August 2023. He joined the bench in October 2004 as a puisne judge of the Gauteng Division. Before that, he was a practising attorney in Mpumalanga.

== Early life and education ==
Legodi was born on 9 July 1954 on a farm near Ga-Maphoto in the former Northern Transvaal. He was the seventh of eight siblings and grew up in the nearby township of Ga-Maja outside Polokwane. He matriculated in 1975 at Mokomene High School in Soekmekaar and went on to the University of the North the following year. Initially registered for a BCom degree, he soon transferred to a BProc and, after a brief hiatus from 1978 to 1979 due to a lack of funds, he graduated in 1981.

== Legal career ==
After his graduation, Legodi spent a year working at the magistrate's court in Lebowakgomo, where he was an interpreter, clerk, and prosecutor. In 1982, he began his articles of clerkship at the firm of Ngoepe and Machaka, Bernard Ngoepe's firm of attorneys. He moved to Mbombela, Eastern Transvaal in 1984 in order to join the firm of Phosa, Mojapele & Partners, led by Phineas Mojapelo and Mathews Phosa; he was a legal assistant there until October 1986, when he was admitted as an attorney.

In February 1987, Legodi partnered with A. K. Khoza to launch Legodi, Khoza & Partners, a firm of attorneys in Bushbuckridge. The firm specialized in human rights cases, and Legodi was a senior partner until 1996, when he opened his own solo practice, Francis Legodi & Associates. He ran his solo practice until he joined the bench in 2004. During that time, he was the chairperson of the Mpumalanga Parks Board from 1996 to 1998 and an acting judge in the Pretoria High Court on several occasions from 2000 onwards.

== Gauteng High Court: 2004–2017 ==
In July 2004, President Thabo Mbeki announced that, on the advice of the Judicial Service Commission, he would appoint Legodi as a permanent judge in the Gauteng Division of the High Court of South Africa. Legodi took office on 1 October 2004 and sat in the Pretoria High Court. Among other prominent matters, Legodi presided in the General Council of the Bar's application to have prosecutors Nomgcobo Jiba and Lawrence Mrwebi struck from the roll of advocates due to deficient conduct. Legodi granted the bar's application, but his order was overturned by the Supreme Court of Appeal.

In addition to his service in the High Court, Legodi was appointed as the chairperson of the Military Appeal Court in 2007 and as the chairperson of the Magistrates Commission in 2010. He was also an acting judge in the Supreme Court of Appeal in 2013 and 2014.

=== Seriti Commission ===
In October 2011, President Jacob Zuma appointed Legodi to the three-member Seriti Commission, the commission of inquiry into alleged corruption in the 1999 Arms Deal. However, Legodi resigned from that position in July 2013, shortly before the commission's hearings began; although the Presidency said that he had retired for confidential personal reasons, the Mail & Guardian reported that he had been sidelined by the commission's chairperson, Willie Seriti.

=== Judicial Service Commission nominations ===
During his 13 years in the Gauteng High Court, Legodi was unsuccessfully shortlisted for promotion on four occasions. He was one of 24 candidates interviewed for four vacancies in the Constitutional Court in September 2009; one of three candidates interviewed for the position of Judge President of the Gauteng High Court in April 2012 (a position awarded to Dunstan Mlambo); one of seven candidates interviewed for the position of Judge President of the Limpopo High Court in April 2015 (a position awarded to Ephraim Makgoba); and one of seven candidates shortlisted for two vacancies in the Supreme Court of Appeal in March 2016, though, in that case, he withdrew his candidacy before the interviews were held.

== Mpumalanga High Court: 2017–2023 ==
In 2016, when the Gauteng High Court established a civil circuit court in Mpumalanga Province, Legodi began spending a large amount of time in the province ahead of the establishment of a free-standing Mpumalanga Division of the High Court. In April 2017, he was the sole candidate interviewed by the Judicial Service Commission for the position of Judge President of the Mpumalanga Division. The Judicial Service Commission recommended him for appointment, and President Zuma confirmed his appointment with effect from 1 August 2017. The Mpumalanga Division held its first sitting in Mbombela in May 2019, with Legodi presiding over two criminal matters, and President Cyril Ramaphosa officially opened the new court in November 2019.

Legodi retired from the judiciary on 21 August 2023. He is commemorated by a statue in the Mbombela High Court building.

== Personal life ==
He is married to M. M. Legodi, with whom he has three adult children.
