= North West High Court =

North West Division of the High Court of South Africa
- Interactive map of North West Division of the High Court of South Africa
- 25.831°S 25.611°E
- Established: 1977
- Jurisdiction: North West, South Africa
- Location: Mahikeng
- Coordinates: 25.831°S 25.611°E
- Composition method: Presidential appointment on the advice of the Judicial Service Commission
- Authorised by: Chp. 8 of the Constitution; Superior Courts Act, 2013
- Appeals to: Supreme Court of Appeal; Constitutional Court
- Number of positions: 7

Judge President
- Currently: Ronald Deon Hendricks

The North West High Court (in full the North West Division of the High Court of South Africa) is a superior court of law with general jurisdiction over the North West province of South Africa. The court sits at Mahikeng and consists of seven judges.

== History ==
In November 1977 a High Court was established at Mmabatho (now a suburb of Mahikeng) to take over the jurisdiction of the provincial divisions of the Supreme Court of South Africa in the bantustan of Bophuthatswana. A month later Bophuthatswana achieved nominal independence from South Africa and the High Court became the Supreme Court of Bophuthatswana. At first its decisions could be appealed to the Appellate Division of the Supreme Court of South Africa, but in 1982 a separate Appellate Division was established within the Bophuthatswana court.

When Bophuthatswana was reincorporated in South Africa on 27 April 1994, the court remained in existence, but three months later the Appellate Division was abolished and its jurisdiction transferred to the South African Appellate Division. When the final Constitution came into force in 1997 the remaining General Division of the Supreme Court of Bophuthatswana became one of the High Courts of South Africa. In 2001 the magisterial districts of Vryburg, Lichtenburg, Coligny, Zeerust, Groot Marico, Swartruggens, Koster, Rustenburg and Delareyville were added to its jurisdiction. It was known as the Bophuthatswana Division until 2009, when it was renamed the North West High Court by the Renaming of High Courts Act. In 2013, in the restructuring brought about by the Superior Courts Act, it became the North West Division of the High Court of South Africa.

In 2018 the jurisdiction of the division was extended to the whole of the North West province except for Madibeng (Brits) which remained under the Gauteng Division. A further change in 2026 brought Madibeng into the division so that the North West Division now has jurisdiction over the whole province.
