= Mpumalanga High Court =

Mpumalanga Division of the High Court of South Africa
- Interactive map of Mpumalanga Division of the High Court of South Africa
- 25.4734°S 30.9616°E
- Jurisdiction: Mpumalanga, South Africa
- Location: Mbombela (main seat), Middelburg (local seat)
- Coordinates: 25.4734°S 30.9616°E
- Composition method: Presidential appointment on the advice of the Judicial Service Commission
- Authorised by: Chp. 8 of the Constitution; Superior Courts Act, 2013
- Appeals to: Supreme Court of Appeal or Constitutional Court
- Number of positions: 9

Judge President
- Currently: Segopotje Mphahlele
- Since: 2023

The Mpumalanga High Court (in full the Mpumalanga Division of the High Court of South Africa) is a superior court of law with general jurisdiction over the Mpumalanga province of South Africa. The main seat of the court in Mbombela (Nelspruit) opened on 13 May 2019. The court also has a local seat at Middelburg. Before the opening of the division, the Gauteng High Court at Pretoria had jurisdiction over Mpumalanga and circuit courts of that division sat at Mbombela and Middelburg. The division consists of nine judges, with six (including the judge president and deputy judge president) at Mbombela, and three at Middelburg.

== Seats ==
Map of the areas of jurisdiction of the seats of the division

Following the 2023 report of a committee on rationalising the jurisdiction of High Court divisions,, the areas of jurisdiction of the seats of the Mpumalanga division were reorganised with effect from 1 July 2026.

City	Coordinates	Jurisdiction
Mbombela (main seat)	25.4733°S 30.9617°E	Exclusive jurisdiction over Ehlanzeni District Municipality and Albert Luthuli Local Municipality; Concurrent appeal jurisdiction over the whole Mpumalanga province
Middelburg	25.7621°S 29.4578°E	Nkangala District Municipality and Gert Sibande District Municipality excluding Albert Luthuli Local Municipality

== List of Judges President ==
- 2017–2023: Frans Legodi
- 2023–present: Segopotje Mphahlele
