= Gauteng High Court =

Superior court of law in Gauteng, South Africa

Gauteng Division of the High Court of South Africa
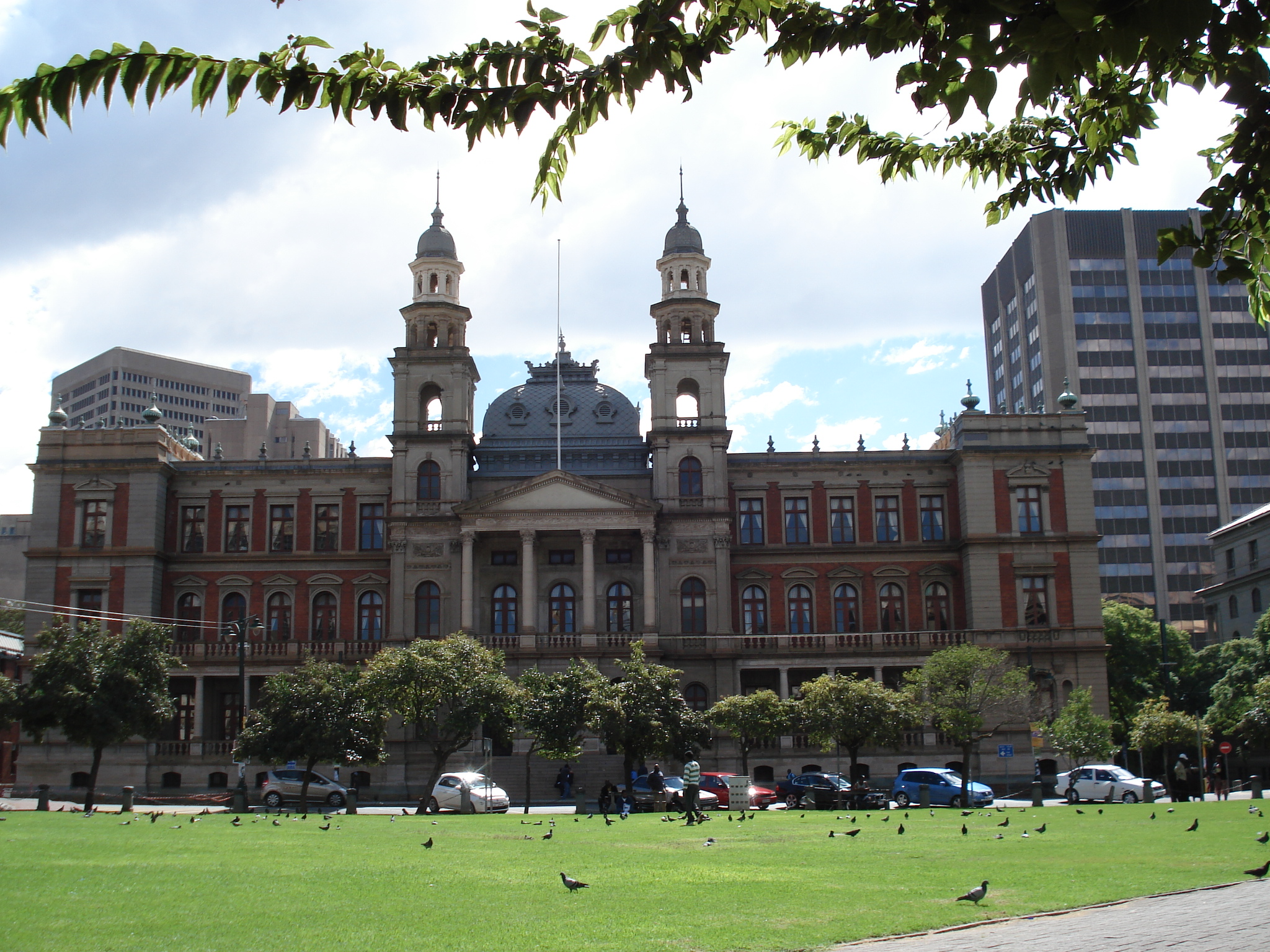
- The Palace of Justice in Pretoria
- Interactive map of Gauteng Division of the High Court of South Africa
- 25.7446°S 28.1874°E
- Established: 1877 (High Court of the ZAR)
- Jurisdiction: Gauteng, South Africa
- Location: Pretoria (main seat), Johannesburg (local seat)
- Coordinates: 25.7446°S 28.1874°E
- Composition method: Presidential appointment on the advice of the Judicial Service Commission
- Authorised by: Chp. 8 of the Constitution; Superior Courts Act, 2013
- Appeals to: Supreme Court of Appeal; Constitutional Court
- Number of positions: 86

Judge President
- Currently: Audrey Ledwaba (acting)
- Since: August 2025

The Gauteng High Court (in full the Gauteng Division of the High Court of South Africa) is a superior court of law which has general jurisdiction over the South African province of Gauteng. The main seat of the division is at Pretoria, while a local seat at Johannesburg has concurrent jurisdiction over the southern parts of Gauteng.

Audrey Ledwaba has been the Acting Judge President of the division since appointment of Dunstan Mlambo as Deputy Chief Justice of South Africa. As of February 2024 the division has positions for 86 active judges, made up of 46 in Pretoria and 40 in Johannesburg.

== History ==
A High Court was established for the South African Republic (the Transvaal Republic) in 1877, while the Witwatersrand gold fields were visited by a circuit court subordinate to the High Court. Both courts ceased to exist as a result of the British victory in the Second Anglo-Boer War. In 1902, two superior courts were established for the new Transvaal Colony: the Supreme Court of the Transvaal in Pretoria, and subordinate to it the High Court of Witwatersrand in Johannesburg. On the creation of the Union of South Africa these courts became the Transvaal Provincial Division and the Witwatersrand Local Division, respectively, of the Supreme Court of South Africa.

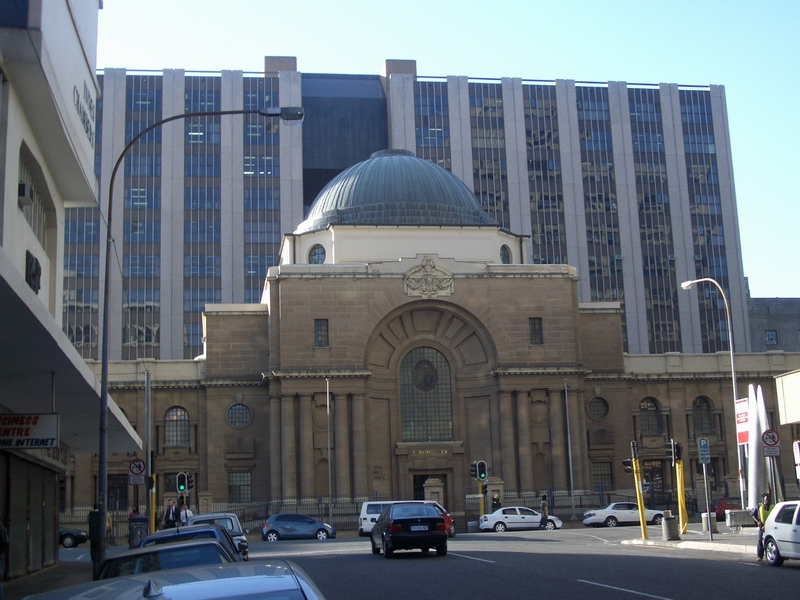
The court building in Johannesburg

The Transvaal Provincial Division's area of jurisdiction was reduced in 1977 and 1979 when Bophuthatswana and Venda became nominally independent and established their own supreme courts. When the current Constitution of South Africa came into force in 1997 the Transvaal and Witwatersrand Divisions of the Supreme Court of South Africa and the Supreme Courts of Bophuthatswana and Venda all became High Courts. In 2001 some districts in North West were removed from the jurisdiction of the Transvaal Division and placed under the Bophuthatswana Division in Mafikeng. In 2009 the Transvaal and Witwatersrand divisions were renamed the North Gauteng and South Gauteng High Courts, respectively. In 2013, in the restructuring brought about by the Superior Courts Act, the courts became two seats of a single Gauteng Division of the High Court of South Africa.

The Limpopo and Mpumalanga Divisions were established in 2016 and 2019 respectively, removing those provinces from the jurisdiction of the Gauteng Division. In 2018 jurisdiction over the remaining parts of the North West province, except for Madibeng (Brits) was transferred to the North West Division. A further change in 2026 moved Madibeng to the North West Division, so the jurisdiction of the Gauteng Division no longer extends beyond Gauteng province. The 2026 notice also redefined the jurisdictional areas of the two seats of the Gauteng Division.

== Seats ==
Map of the areas of jurisdiction of the seats of the division

City	Coordinates	Jurisdiction	Former names
Pretoria (main seat)	25.7446°S 28.1874°E	Exclusive jurisdiction over the City of Tshwane Metropolitan Municipality; concurrent appeal jurisdiction over the whole province of Gauteng	High Court of the South African Republic; Supreme Court of the Transvaal; Transvaal Provincial Division; North Gauteng High Court
Johannesburg	26.2023°S 28.0453°E	City of Johannesburg Metropolitan Municipality, City of Ekurhuleni Metropolitan Municipality, West Rand District Municipality, Sedibeng District Municipality	High Court of Witwatersrand; Witwatersrand Local Division; South Gauteng High Court

== List of Judges President ==
Judges President
№	Incumbent	Tenure	Notes
1.	Jacob de Villiers (1868–1932)	1910 – 1920	Subsequently Chief Justice of South Africa
2.	Sir John Wessels (1862–1936)	1920 – 1923	Subsequently Chief Justice of South Africa
3.	Sir Arthur Weir Mason (1860–1924)	1923 – 1924	Died in Office
4.	John Stephen Curlewis (1863–1940)	1924 – 1927	Subsequently Chief Justice of South Africa
5.	Daniël de Waal (1873–1938)	1927 – 1937	
6.	Benjamin Tindall (1879–1963)	1937 – 1938	Judge of Appeal from 1938
7.	Leopold Greenberg (1885–1964)	1938 – 1942	Judge of Appeal from 1943
8.	Charles Barry (1877–1956)	1943 – 1947	
9.	Gerrie Maritz (1889–1964)	1947 – 1959	
10.	Frans Rumpff (1912–1992)	1959 – 1961	Subsequently Chief Justice of South Africa
11.	Quartus de Wet (1899–1980)	1961 – 1969	
12.	P. M. Cillié (1915–1996)	1969 – 1979	Judge of Appeal from 1980
13.	W. G. Boshoff (1916–1989)	1980 – 1985	Judge of Appeal from 1985
14.	H. H. Moll (1921–2003)	1985 – 1991	
15.	Frikkie Eloff (1925–2017)	1991 – 1998	
16.	Bernard Ngoepe (1947– )	1998 – 2012	
17.	Dunstan Mlambo (c. 1960– )	2012 – 2025	Subsequently Deputy Chief Justice of South Africa

== Notable judges ==
As of January 2023, the permanent judges of the Gauteng Division included:

- Dunstan Mlambo (Judge President)
- Aubrey Ledwaba (Deputy Judge President)
- Roland Sutherland (Deputy Judge President)
- Annali Basson
- Selby Baqwa
- Fayeeza Kathree-Setiloane
- Bashier Vally
- Raylene Keightley
- David Unterhalter
- Gcina Malindi

== See also ==
- Category:Judges of the Gauteng High Court
