= High Court of South Africa =

Superior court of law in South Africa

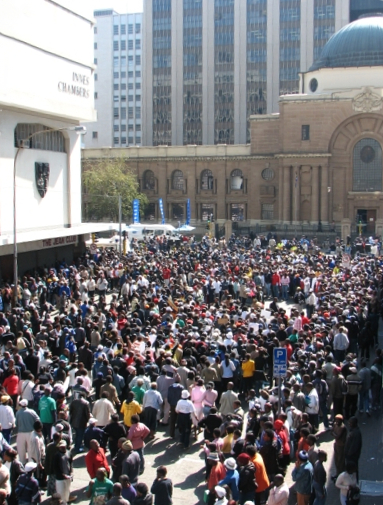
A crowd outside the Johannesburg High Court during the Jacob Zuma rape trial.

The High Court of South Africa is a superior court of law in South Africa. It is divided into nine provincial divisions, some of which sit in more than one location. Each High Court division has general jurisdiction over a defined geographical area in which it is situated. The decisions of a division are binding on magistrates' courts within its area of jurisdiction. The High Court has jurisdiction over all matters, but it usually only hears civil matters involving more than 400,000 rand, and serious criminal cases. It also hears appeals or reviews from magistrates' courts and other lower courts.

The court and its divisions are constituted in their current form by the Superior Courts Act, 2013. They replaced the previous separate High Courts, which had in 1997 replaced the provincial and local divisions of the former Supreme Court of South Africa and the supreme courts of the TBVC states ("Bantustans" created by the apartheid government in the 1950s).

== Structure and jurisdiction ==
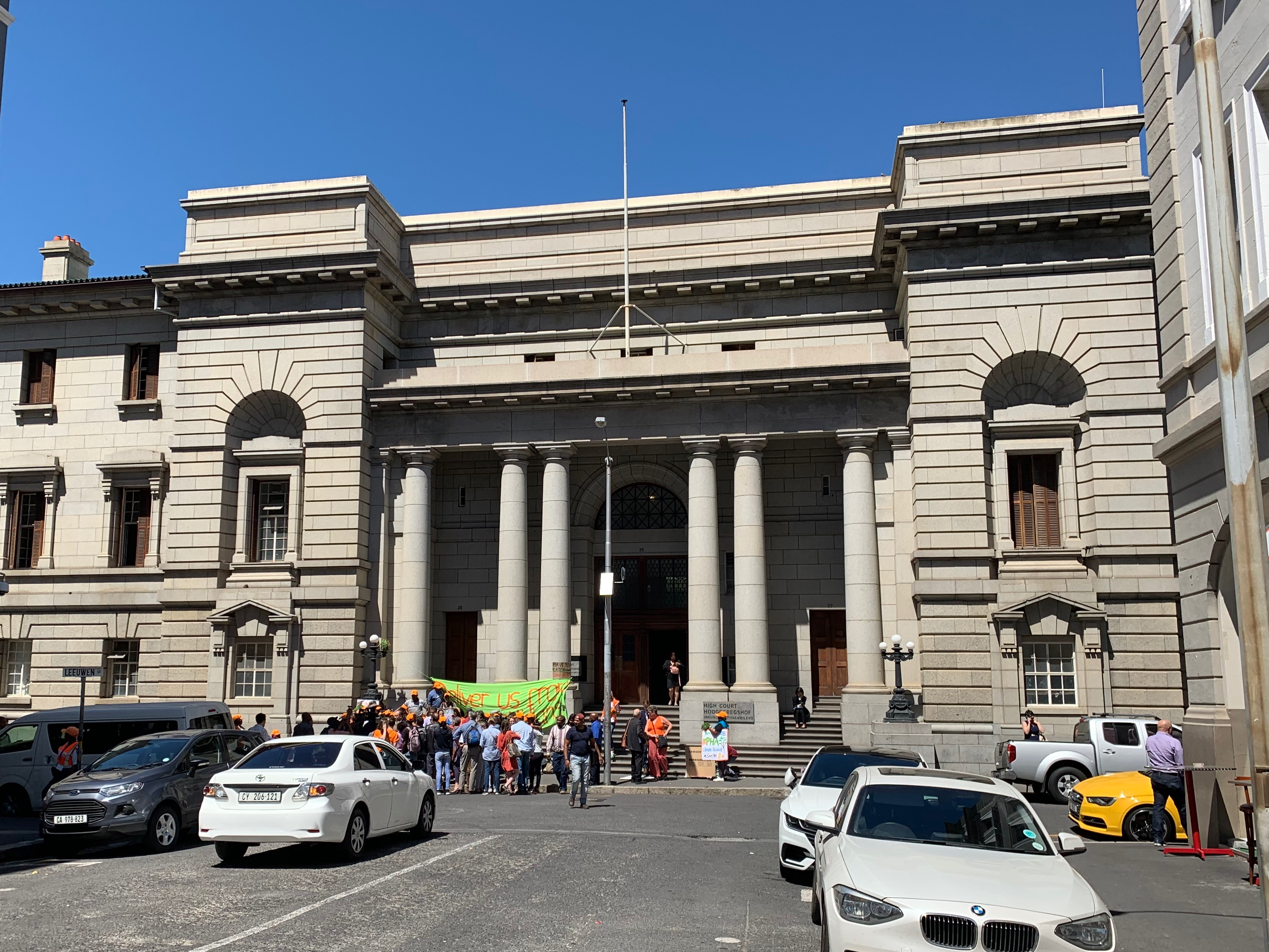
The Western Cape High Court in Cape Town

Each division of the High Court consists of a judge president, one or more deputy judges president, and other judges. The size of a division's bench varies from 7 judges in the Northern Cape and North West divisions to 86 judges in the Gauteng division. All judges are appointed by the President on the advice of the Judicial Service Commission. High Court judges generally hold office until age 70, although provisions exist for earlier or later retirement depending on the judge's length of service.

Each High Court division has jurisdiction over a defined area of the country as determined by the Minister of Justice. The division's area of jurisdiction does not necessarily correspond to the boundary of the province; for example in the past the Gauteng Division has also had jurisdiction over parts of North West, Limpopo and Mpumalanga provinces. Since July 2026, however, the jurisdiction of divisions has been aligned with the provincial boundaries.

Some divisions have multiple seats in different cities; each seat has jurisdiction over a defined area of the division. One seat is designated the main seat and holds concurrent jurisdiction to hear appeals for the entire division. The judge president can also establish circuit courts, in which a judge of the division travels to hear cases in areas remote from the seat of the court. Each circuit court must be held at least twice a year.

A High Court division has jurisdiction over all cases, civil or criminal, arising within its area of jurisdiction, except for those assigned by law to another court (for example labour cases heard by the Labour Court or election cases heard by the Electoral Court). It also has jurisdiction over appeals from magistrate's courts located within its area of jurisdiction.

== Important officers in a High Court division ==
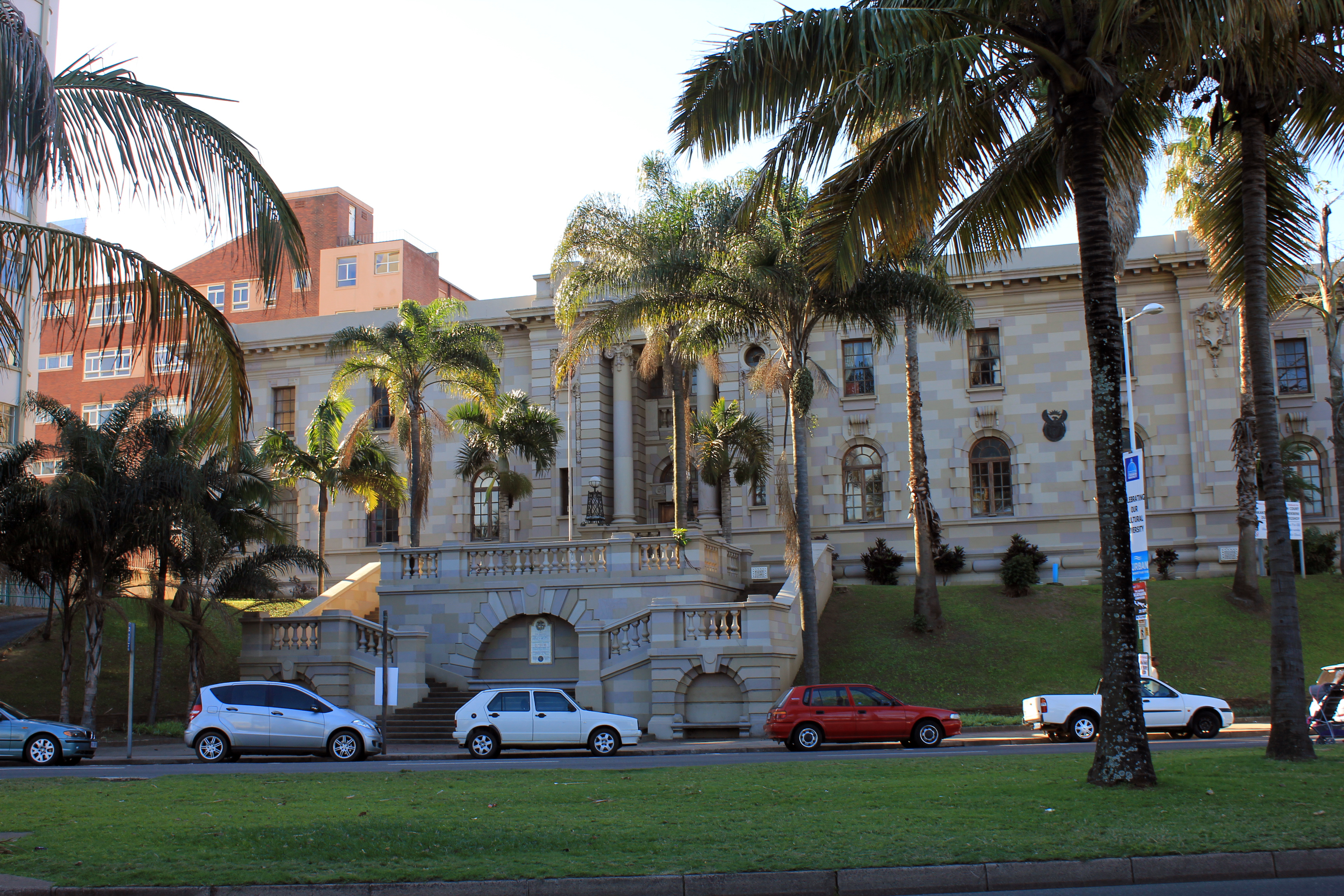
The Durban courthouse of the KwaZulu-Natal High Court

Each division is headed by a Judge President and Deputy Judge President. The registrar keeps all the official court documents. The family advocate must be consulted on all matters involving children, as the High Court is the "upper guardian" of all children in South Africa. The Master of the High Court keeps all the records relating to people's estates (whether they are deceased or insolvent). The Sheriff delivers certain documents to the parties in a civil case, and also attaches property when a warrant is issued. The Director of Public Prosecutions, who used to be called the Attorney-General, is responsible for criminal prosecutions by the state. The State Attorney is the lawyer who represents the state in civil actions (where the state is suing or being sued).

== Divisions ==
Map of the areas of jurisdiction of High Court divisions and seats

The Superior Courts Act, 2013, divides the High Court into nine divisions, one for each province. Some divisions have multiple seats of the court; the main seat has jurisdiction over the whole province, while the local seats have concurrent jurisdiction over some part of the province. The divisions and seats are listed in the following table.

| Division | Seat | No. of judges |
|---|---|---|
| Eastern Cape High Court | Makhanda (main) | 11 |
| Eastern Cape High Court | Bhisho | 4 |
| Eastern Cape High Court | Mthatha | 8 |
| Eastern Cape High Court | Gqeberha | 8 |
| Free State High Court | Bloemfontein | 16 |
| Gauteng High Court | Pretoria (main) | 46 |
| Gauteng High Court | Johannesburg | 40 |
| KwaZulu-Natal High Court | Pietermaritzburg (main) | 15 |
| KwaZulu-Natal High Court | Durban | 15 |
| Limpopo High Court | Polokwane (main) | 6 |
| Limpopo High Court | Thohoyandou | 3 |
| Mpumalanga High Court | Mbombela (main) | 6 |
| Mpumalanga High Court | Middelburg | 3 |
| North West High Court | Mahikeng | 7 |
| Northern Cape High Court | Kimberley | 7 |
| Western Cape High Court | Cape Town | 33 |

The 2025 report of the "Committee on the Rationalisation of Areas under the Jurisdiction of the Divisions of the High Court of South Africa and Judicial Establishments" led by former deputy chief justice Dikgang Moseneke proposed the creation of new local seats at Welkom in the Free State, Palm Ridge (Katlehong) in Gauteng, Rustenburg in the North West, Upington in the Northern Cape, and Thembalethu (George) in the Western Cape.
