= Beric John Croome =

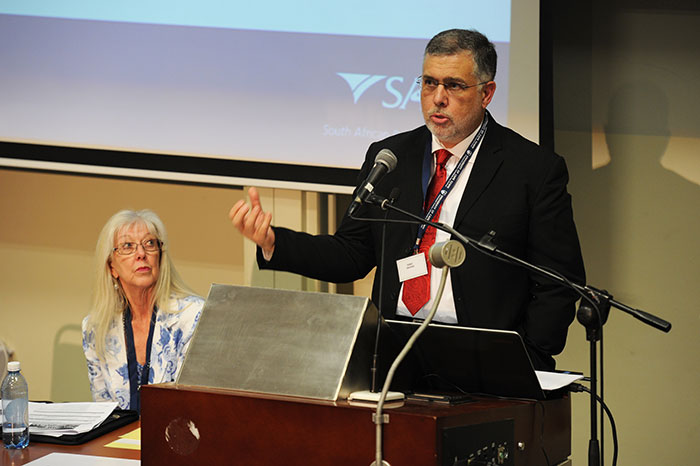
Croome addressing the "100 years of Taxation in South Africa" conference at University of Cape Town in 2014. Professor Roeleveld of UCT looks on.

Beric John Croome (23 May 1960 – 22 April 2019) was a chartered accountant, Advocate of the High Court of South Africa and one of South Africa's tax law scholars.

== Research interests ==
Croome's doctoral thesis dealt with issues relating to constitutional law, taxpayers' rights and the powers of the South African Revenue Services. This thesis won the doctoral category of the Deneys Reitz Tax Thesis Competition 2009. In 2009, the South African Institute of Tax Practitioners recognised this thesis as "a significant contribution to South African tax Jurisprudence". In November 2014, Croome presented a paper entitled "The Shift to a Constitutional Democracy in 1994 and the impact thereof on tax law in South Africa" at the University of Cape Town's conference "Income Tax in South Africa: The First 100 Years".

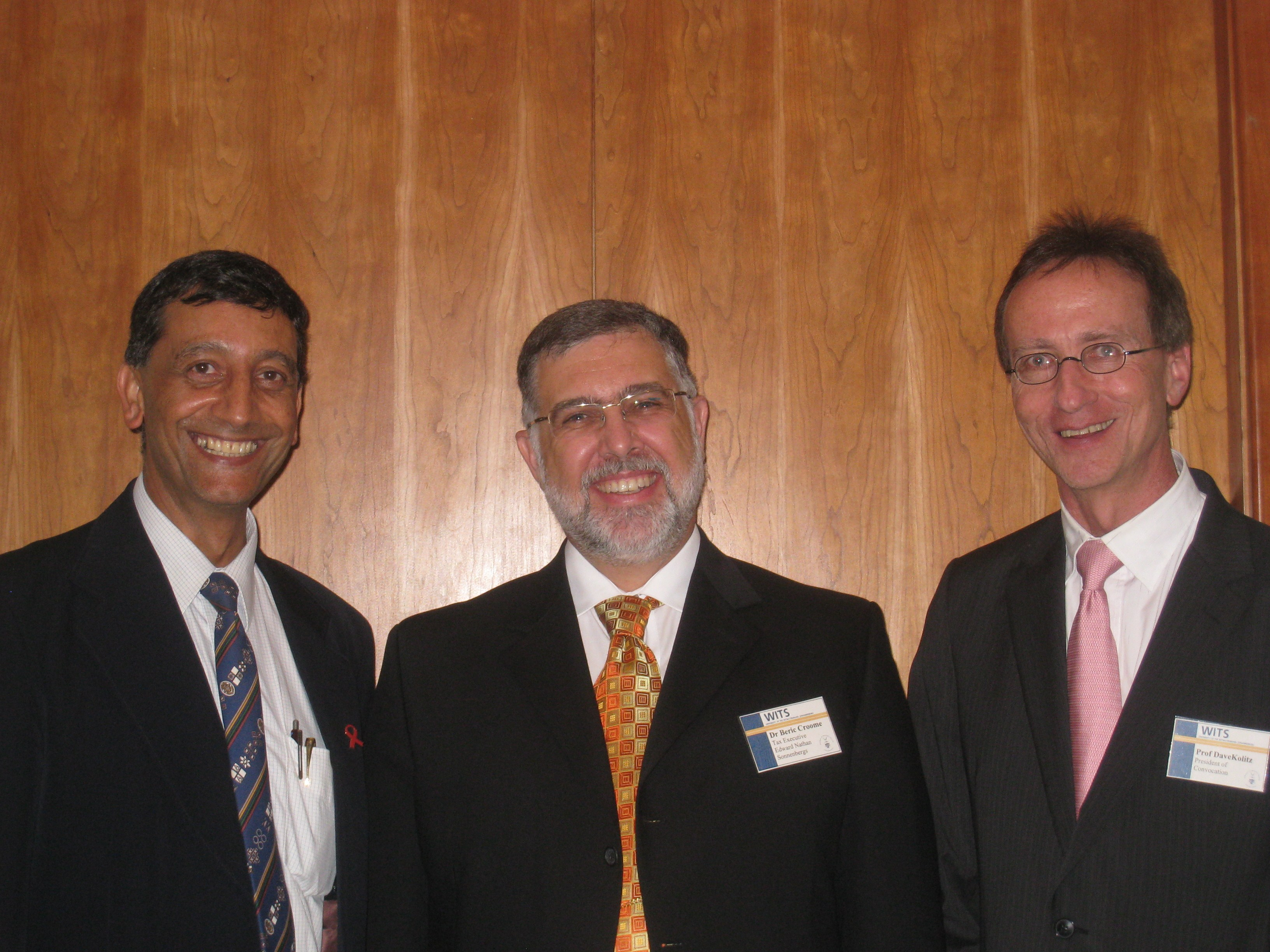
4 May 2009: Dr Beric Croome is keynote speaker for the University of the Witwatersrand (Wits) graduation ceremony for all the graduating students of the Faculty of Commerce, Law and Management. Photograph shows from left to right: Acting Vice-Chancellor, Professor Y Ballim, Dr Beric Croome and Professor David Kolitz, President of the Convocation of the University of the Witwatersrand

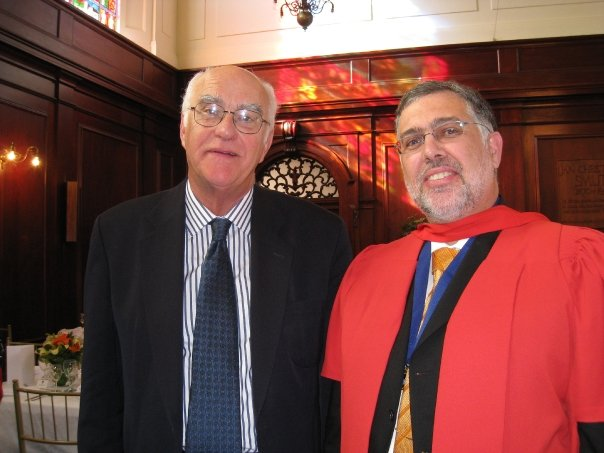
13 June 2008: Dr Beric Croome (right) at University of Cape Town in discussion with Retired Judge Ian Gordon Farlem, Chairman of the Judicial Commission of Inquiry into the 2012 Marikana Massacre

== Awards and honours ==
Croome was recognised as a leading/recommended lawyer by Chambers and Partners Global Guide to the World's Leading Lawyers 2017, 2016, 2015, 2014 – Tax (South Africa); The Legal 500 Guide to Outstanding Lawyers 2016 – Tax (South Africa); Who’s Who Legal 2016, 2015 – Corporate Tax: Advisory (South Africa); Who’s Who Legal 2016 – Corporate Tax: Controversy (South Africa); Best Lawyers® 2017, 2016, 2015, 2014 – Tax (South Africa) and Tax Directors Handbook TDG250 2016, 2014 – Tax (South Africa). International law directory, Chambers & Partners, ranked Croome as a "key individual who was a hard-working and very knowledgeable practitioner". In 2010, the editors of Best Lawyers International and Business Day Tax & Law Review awarded Croome "Lawyer of the Year 2010 – South Africa (Tax)". In 2002, Croome was a nominee for the University of the Witwatersrand Convocation Honour Award for his contribution to commerce and industry.

== The Dr Beric Croome Post-Graduate Scholarship in Tax Law ==
In 2020, the University of Cape Town Faculty of Law established the "Dr Beric Croome Post-Graduate Tax Law Scholarship". from which an annual scholarship will be awarded to a student undertaking postgraduate tax law studies.

== Works ==
In 2017, Croome co-authored Street Smart Taxpayers: A Practical Guide to your Rights in South Africa (Juta Law, 2017) with his wife, South African poet and author Judy Croome.

Croome was the managing editor of and a contributing author to Tax Law: An Introduction (Juta and Company, 2013.) In the Canadian textbook Tax Litigation (edited by David W. Chodikoff and published by The European Lawyer, a division of Thomson Reuters (UK), 2013), he was the co-contributor of the chapter on South African tax. He was also the author of Taxpayers' Rights in South Africa (Juta and Company, 2010), a textbook examining taxation-related entrenched clauses in the 1996 constitution, and a co-author with Lynette Olivier of Tax Administration (1st edition, Juta and Company, 2010) and Tax Administration (2nd edition, Juta and Company, 2015).

He was the author of the "Tax Bites" column in Business Day (2008 to 2018) and the "Dear SARS" column in Accountancy SA (2006 to 2008) and appeared on South African television and radio.

Croome's paper entitled "The Shift to a Constitutional Democracy in 1994 and the impact thereof on tax law in South Africa" presented at the University of Cape Town's conference "Income Tax in South Africa: The First 100 Years" was published in 2016.

Croome had published tax articles in international journals (European Tax Service, published by Bloomberg BNA, October 2016, volume 18, issue 10, (STEP, UK, 2013), (Mondaq, International, 2008 to 2014)(Lexology, UK/Hong Kong,2010 to 2014)and was the South African Branch reporter for the International Fiscal Association (1999) and, at the International Fiscal Association 69th Annual Congress in Basel 2015, Croome was both the South African Branch Reporter and a panellist on "Subject 2 The Practical Protection of Taxpayer Rights". Croome also authored a report on Taxpayers' Rights for the University of Cape Town's law journal, Acta Juridica (2002).

== Personal life ==
Croome was a Tax Executive at Edward Nathan Sonnenbergs, one of the "Big Five" South African law firms. He was married to South African author and poet, Judy Croome (née Judy Ann Heinemann).

== Death ==
Croome died on 22 April 2019 after a long battle with cancer
