= Fayeeza Kathree-Setiloane =

South African judge

The Honourable Fayeeza Kathree-Setiloane

Judge of the Supreme Court of Appeal
- Incumbent
- Assumed office 1 December 2023
- Appointed by: Cyril Ramaphosa

Judge of the High Court
- In office 31 October 2010 – 30 November 2023
- Appointed by: Jacob Zuma
- Division: Gauteng

Personal details
- Born: 19 August 1965 (age 61) Durban, Natal Province; South Africa
- Spouse: Thero Setiloane
- Education: University of Natal (BA, LLB); Georgetown University Law Center (LLM)

Fayeeza Kathree-Setiloane (born 19 August 1965) is a South African judge of the Supreme Court of Appeal. She joined the appellate court in December 2023 after 13 years in the Gauteng High Court. Before her appointment to the bench in October 2010, she practiced as an advocate of the High Court in Johannesburg; she was involved in constitutional litigation, including through the Legal Resources Centre, and also served a stint in corporate advisory at Werksmans.

The Judicial Service Commission has twice nominated Kathree-Setiloane for appointment to the Constitutional Court of South Africa, where she was an acting justice in 2017 and where she clerked for Justice Yvonne Mokgoro in 1995.

== Early life and education ==
Kathree-Setiloane was born on 19 August 1965 in Durban in the former Natal Province. She attended the University of Natal, where she completed a Bachelor of Arts in 1988 and a Bachelor of Laws in 1991; while a student, she was a research assistant at the university's Centre for Socio-Legal Studies. She was a fellow at the Legal Resources Centre in Durban between 1991 and 1992, during which time she was also involved in Agenda, a prominent feminist journal – she was a member of its editorial board and wrote a regular column on "Judges and Gender". She left Durban to attend the Georgetown University Law Center on a Fulbright Scholarship, and she completed a Master of Laws there in 1993.

== Legal practice ==
Upon her return to South Africa, in the months ahead of the first post-apartheid general election, Kathree-Setiloane worked briefly as an elections administrator for the Independent Electoral Commission in the Northern Cape. Thereafter she joined the public law department at the University of the Western Cape, where she lectured in international human rights law between 1994 and 1995. During the same period, she was a senior research fellow in the gender project of the university's Community Law Centre. When the post-apartheid Constitutional Court of South Africa began sitting in 1995, she became a member of its first cohort of law clerks, clerking for Justice Yvonne Mokgoro.

In 1996, Kathree-Setiloane completed her pupillage under Gilbert Marcus and gained admittance to the Johannesburg Bar as an advocate. She practiced in the constitutional litigation unit of the Legal Resources Centre in Johannesburg for a year and then continued in private practice as an advocate for almost a decade. She was a member of the executive committee of the Group One Chambers between 2003 and 2004 and then of the Duma Nokwe Group between 2005 and 2006. In 2005, she acted for the Lesbian and Gay Equality Project and 18 other applicants in the matters of Minister of Home Affairs v Fourie and Lesbian and Gay Equality Project v Minister of Home Affairs; the Constitutional Court's landmark ruling in that matter affirmed a constitutional right for same-sex couples to marry, leading to the passage of the Civil Union Act of 2006 the following year. She was also a member of the editorial board of the South African Journal of Human Rights between 1997 and 2006.

In October 2006, Kathree-Setiloane left the bar to join Werksmans Advisory Services, where she served as a director and in-house counsel; she was also a member of the executive committee of its parent company, Werksmans Attorneys, from 2008 to 2010. She returned to practice at the Bar at the beginning of 2010, but within a month was appointed as an acting judge of the South Gauteng High Court.

== Gauteng High Court: 2010–2023 ==
Kathree-Setiloane acted in the Gauteng High Court between 1 February and 30 October 2010, and at the end of that stint, President Jacob Zuma appointed her permanently to the High Court of South Africa. She joined the Gauteng High Court bench permanently on 31 October. During her 13 years on the bench, over 40 of her judgements were reported, and several were confirmed on appeal by the Constitutional Court or Supreme Court of Appeal.

One of her rulings upheld by the Constitutional Court was that in McBride v Minister of Police, concerning the suspension of Robert McBride from the head of the Independent Police Investigative Directorate. Other prominent matters heard by Kathree-Setiloane included Export Development Canada's challenge to the use by the controversial Gupta family of a private jet leased from StoneRiver; a dispute between South African Airways and SA Airlink about debts owed by a company in business rescue; a case on the status and contents of the national mining charter; and the case which resulted in Supra Mahumapelo's reinstatement to his leadership position in the African National Congress (ANC). She was also scheduled to hear the ANC's case against the Goodman Gallery and City Press in the Spear matter, until the Deputy Judge President ordered a hearing in front of the full bench.

=== Secondments ===
While serving on the High Court bench, Kathree-Setiloane acted in higher courts on several occasions. Her stints as an acting judge of the Labour Appeal Court, for various periods between 2014 and 2022, generated 20 reported judgements. She acted in the Competition Appeal Court for various periods between 2018 and 2022, and in the Supreme Court of Appeal for a cumulative four terms: between December 2015 and May 2016, and then continuously between December 2022 and December 2023.

Between June and December 2017, Kathree-Setiloane was an acting justice in South Africa's highest court, the Constitutional Court; she was appointed by President Zuma to stand in during the vacation leave of Justice Sisi Khampepe. During that period, she wrote the Constitutional Court's unanimous judgement in S.O.S Support Public Broadcasting Coalition v South African Broadcasting Corporation, which concerned the Competition Commission's powers to investigate to a deal that gave MultiChoice exclusive rights to air content from the SABC's archive.

=== Misconduct complaint ===
While Kathree-Setiloane was acting on the Constitutional Court in 2017, two of her law clerks lodged a complaint against her, alleging that she had mistreated them. One of the aggrieved clerks was Wela Mlokoti, the daughter of Supreme Court President Mandisa Maya. Asked about the complaint in 2019, Kathree-Setiloane said that "a lot of it was lies, and mostly untrue and an absolute exaggeration; and petty and trivial". The Judicial Conduct Committee of the Judicial Service Commission referred the complaint to Gauteng Judge President Dunstan Mlambo, who dismissed it. However, Mlokoti appealed his decision, and, in July 2022, the Judicial Conduct Appeal Committee upheld one of her four grounds of complaint, finding that Kathree-Setiloane had falsely impugned Mlokoti's behaviour in an email that was distributed internally. The other three grounds of complaint were dismissed. The Judicial Conduct Committee noted that Kathree-Setiloane had already apologised privately to Mlokoti, but nonetheless ordered her to issue a written apology to Mlokoti and to all staff of the Constitutional Court.

=== Constitutional Court interviews ===
==== 2019 shortlisting ====
In April 2019, the Judicial Service Commission shortlisted and interviewed Kathree-Setiloane for one of two vacancies arising on the Constitutional Court. Although she was considered to be one of the favourites among the six candidates, her interview was contentious. Chief Justice Mogoeng Mogoeng raised concerns about Kathree-Setiloane's attitude and professional courtesy, highlighting two separate instances where her conduct in the Constitutional Court had been the subject of complaints. The first was the clerks' complaint, which at the time had not been heard by the Judicial Conduct Committee; Mandisa Maya had recused herself from Kathree-Setiloane's interview because of a possible conflict of interest in that regard. According to Mogoeng, the second complaint, also arising from Kathree-Setiloane's acting stint in the Constitutional Court, came from the court's manager, who had reported that Kathree-Setiloane had "occupied chambers, and demanded records and... demanded a parking bay" even before her acting appointment was made official. Justice Minister Michael Masutha also told Kathree-Setiloane that she came across as "overbearing" in her "tenor of voice" and "manner of speech".

During the interview, Kathree-Setiloane described herself as "assertive" but denied that she had been demanding or aggressive. She also pointed out that while one of the aggrieved clerks had been transferred to another judge, the other had continued to work well with her until the end of her acting stint. At the end of the interviews, she was the only of the six candidates interviewed who was not nominated to the president as suitable for appointment.

==== 2021 nomination ====
In early 2021, Kathree-Setiloane was one of ten candidates shortlisted for two new vacancies at the Constitutional Court. During her interview in April 2021, members of the Judicial Service Commission were again critical of her personal temperament, with Julius Malema accusing her of being "condescending" towards her junior colleagues; and commentators described her interview answers as "long, meandering and nervous". The Judicial Service Commission nonetheless recommended her as one of five candidates suitable to fill the two vacancies. However, the non-profit Council for the Advancement of the South African Constitution (CASAC) laid a formal complaint against the Judicial Service Commission, accusing it of running an inappropriate interview process in respect of several of the candidates; among other things, CASAC said that Kathree-Setiloane had been "ambushed, required to answer false allegations and wilfully misinterpreted and thereafter unfairly attacked" during her interview, with "'temperament' and 'collegiality'... used with a peculiar and unique vehemence against Kathree-Setiloane".

As a result of CASAC's complaint, the Judicial Service Commission nullified its recommendations and re-interviewed all the candidates in October 2021. The fresh round of interviews had the same outcome, and Kathree-Setiloane was again one of five candidates recommended for appointment to the two vacancies. However, in December 2021, President Cyril Ramaphosa announced that he had selected Jody Kollapen and Rammaka Mathopo for the positions; Kathree-Setiloane was among the three nominees who were not appointed.

==== 2022 nomination ====
In 2022, Kathree-Setiloane was once again interviewed for two vacancies at the Constitutional Court, this time on a shortlist of only five candidates. Her interview was cordial and she said that she had become more "tempered" and "calmer" since the last round of interviews. She and three other candidates were nominated for appointment by the Judicial Service Commission, but President Ramaphosa again declined to appoint her, selecting Owen Rogers instead.

== Supreme Court of Appeal: 2023 ==
In October 2023, Kathree-Setiloane appeared before the Judicial Service Commission again, this time to interview for one of four vacancies on the Supreme Court of Appeal. At that time, she was the most senior woman judge at the Johannesburg High Court and was serving her third consecutive term as an acting judge in the Supreme Court. Describing herself as a "veteran" of the Judicial Service Commission interviews, Kathree-Setiloane told the panel that the Supreme Court's deputy president, Xola Petse, had personally invited her to interview for the position, and that her ambition to serve on the Constitutional Court would not undermine her commitment to the Supreme Court. Observers viewed her as the frontrunner among the 10 candidates interviewed, and the Judicial Service Commission recommended her and Shane Kgoele for appointment. On 7 November, President Ramaphosa confirmed her permanent appointment to the Supreme Court of Appeal, with effect from 1 December 2023.

== Personal life ==
She is married to businessman Thero Setiloane; they do not have children. Their holiday house in Parys was featured in an edition of House and Leisure magazine.
