= Theart v Minnaar =

South African legal case

- Court: Supreme Court of Appeal
- Full case name: Theart and Another v Minnaar NO; Senekal v Winskor 174 (Pty) Ltd
- Decided: 3 December 2009
- Docket nos.: 483/08; 007/09
- Citations: [2009] ZASCA 173; 2010 (2) All SA 275 (SCA); 2010 (3) SA 327 (SCA)

Case history
- Appealed from: Theart and Another v Minnaar NO [2008] ZAWCHC 43; 2009 (3) SA 503 (C) in the High Court of South Africa, Cape Provincial Division; Senekal v Winskor 174 (Pty) Ltd (appeal no. 007/09) in the High Court of South Africa, Cape Provincial Division

Court membership
- Judges sitting: Mpati P, Brand JA, Snyders JA, Malan JA and Bosielo JA

Case opinions
- Decision by: Bosielo JA (unanimous)

Keywords
- Eviction procedure; magistrates' courts; section 4 of the Prevention of Illegal Eviction from and Unlawful Occupation of Land Act, 1998; section 26(3) of the Constitution

Theart and Another v Minnaar NO; Senekal v Winskor 174 (Pty) Ltd is an important case in South African property law and civil procedure, as well as in the area of legal interpretation. It was heard in the Supreme Court of Appeal on 5 November 2009, with judgment handed down on 3 December. The central issue was the proper interpretation and application of section 4 of the Prevention of Illegal Eviction from and Unlawful Occupation of Land Act 19 of 1998 (PIE) in the magistrates' courts.

In two cases of unlawful occupation of land and actions for statutory eviction from such land, both appealed from the Cape Town High Court, the notice requirements of the Magistrates' Courts came under scrutiny. The Magistrates' Courts Rules compel a procedure differing from that in the High Court of South Africa. However, in a judgment written by Judge of Appeal Ronnie Bosielo, the Supreme Court found that, as long as the notice achieves the general purpose contemplated by the PIE and the Magistrates' Courts Rules, the fact that the notice does not strictly comply with such provisions is not necessarily fatal; thus two notices in two separate documents are not required.

== Facts ==
In the High Court, eviction procedure under PIE is determined by section 4 of that legislation, as well as by the Uniform Rules of the High Court. The combined effect of these statutory provisions is explained in Cape Killarney Property Investments v Mahamba.

The procedure in the magistrates' courts is different from that in the High Court, because the provisions of Rule 55 of the Magistrates' Courts Rules differ from those of Rule 6 of the Uniform Rules of the High Court.

In the magistrates' courts, two notices contained in two separate documents are not required. One will suffice as long as:

1. the content of the document and the manner of service are approved by the magistrate's court with jurisdiction, as envisaged by section 4(2) of PIE, pursuant to a preceding ex parte application;
2. the contents of the document comply with the provisions of section 4(5) of PIE, with Rule 55 of the Magistrates' Courts Rules and the court order under (1); and
3. the document is served on the respondent and the municipality concerned in accordance with section 4(2) of PIE, the Magistrates' Courts Rules pertaining to service and the court order under (1).

== Judgment ==
In the Supreme Court, Judge of Appeal Bosielo handed down judgment on behalf of a unanimous bench (Judge President Lex Mpati and Judges of Appeal Fritz Brand, Suretta Snyders and Frans Malan concurring). Bosielo held that when considering the order to be granted in terms the procedure above, the court is obliged to ensure that the notice will be "effective" in the circumstances of the case, having regard to the intent and import of PIE and section 26(3) of the Constitution.

The fact that the notice served on the respondent is in some respect deficient of section 4(2) or Rule 55 (as it was in both cases here) will not necessarily be fatal if the notice achieved the purpose contemplated by these statutory provisions. Whether that purpose had been achieved cannot be considered in the abstract, but will depend on the facts of each case.

== Counsel ==
Counsel for the appellants was BC Wharton; CHJ Maree appeared for the respondent in case No. 483/08 and M. Verster for the respondent in case No. 007/09. The appellants' attorneys were RP Totos, Cape Town, and Symington & De Kok, Bloemfontein. The respondent's attorneys in case No. 483/08 were Van der Spuy & Vennote, Cape Town, and Phatshoane Henney Ing, Bloemfontein. The respondent's attorneys in case No. 007/09 were JC Van der Berg Attorneys, George, and Hill, McHardy & Herbst Ing, Bloemfontein.
