= Ronnie Bosielo =

South African judge (1956–2018)

The Honourable Ronnie Bosielo

Judge of the Supreme Court of Appeal
- In office 1 October 2009 – 15 May 2018
- Appointed by: Jacob Zuma

Judge of the High Court
- In office 29 January 2001 – 30 September 2009
- Appointed by: Thabo Mbeki
- Division: Gauteng

Personal details
- Born: Lebotsang Orphan Bosielo; 19 August 1957 Johannesburg, Transvaal; Union of South Africa
- Died: 15 May 2018 (aged 60) Johannesburg, Gauteng; Republic of South Africa
- Spouse: Shirley Bosielo
- Education: University of the North; University of Johannesburg

Lebotsang Orphan "Ronnie" Bosielo (19 August 1957 – 15 May 2018) was a South African judge of the Supreme Court of Appeal. Formerly a judge of the High Court of South Africa, he served in the appellate court from October 2009 until his death in May 2018. He was an acting judge in the Constitutional Court in 2012 and 2016, and he was thrice nominated unsuccessfully for permanent appointment to the apex court.

Born in Johannesburg, Bosielo grew up in the North West Province, where he practised as an attorney between 1986 and 1998. Thereafter he practised briefly as an advocate in Johannesburg before he was appointed to the Gauteng Division of the High Court in January 2001.

== Early life and education ==
Bosielo was born on 19 August 1957 in Sophiatown in Johannesburg. He grew up in the present-day North West Province, matriculating at the Lerothodi High School in Bethanie in 1977. Thereafter he went on to the University of the North, where he completed a BJurius in 1981 and an LLB in 1983.

Later in his career, while a practising attorney, he pursued postgraduate education at the University of Johannesburg, graduating with an LLM in 1992 and a diploma in advanced corporate law in 1996.

== Legal career ==
After graduating with his LLB, Bosielo served his articles of clerkship at Enver Surty's firm in Zinniaville; he was a candidate attorney there from 1984 to 1986, when he was admitted as an attorney. Thereafter, in 1987, he became a partner in the firm of Bosielo, Motlanthe & Lekabe in Rustenburg, and in 1992, he set up his own firm, Ronnie Bosielo Attorneys. He ran that firm for the next six years, during which time he was the chairperson of the North West branch of the Black Lawyers Association from 1992 to 1996 and the president of the Law Society of Bophuthatswana from 1996 to 1998. He was also a member of the North West Magistrates Commission from 1997 to 1998.

In 1998, Bosielo was admitted as an advocate of the High Court of South Africa. Leaving practice as an attorney, he joined the bar in Johannesburg the following year, and he was a practising advocate for the next three years.

== Gauteng High Court: 2001–2009 ==
On 29 January 2001, Bosielo joined the bench of the Gauteng Division of the High Court (then still called the Transvaal Provincial Division). He sat in the North Gauteng High Court, where his notable judgements included S v Shilubane, an important judgement on restorative justice in criminal sentencing.

Later in 2001, Bosielo was appointed for the first time as an acting judge in the High Court of Namibia. During a subsequent acting stint in that court, he controversially acquitted Pio Teek, a judge of the Namibian Supreme Court, on various criminal charges, including kidnapping two minor girls. The Namibian Supreme Court overturned the acquittal, raising several issues with Bosielo's treatment of the evidence, and the trial resumed under Bosielo under he acquitted Teek for a second time in 2010; the second acquittal was upheld in the Namibian Supreme Court.

Bosielo also served as acting Judge President of the Northern Cape High Court from 2007 to 2008 and as an acting judge in the Supreme Court of Appeal in 2009. In September 2009, near the end of his service in the High Court, he was appointed as the chairperson of the Interim National Defence Force Service Commission, which was appointed by Lindiwe Sisulu, the Minister of Defence, to investigate conditions of service in the South African National Defence Force. The commission submitted its report in November 2010.

== Supreme Court of Appeal: 2009–2018 ==
In mid-2009, Bosielo was one of four candidates who was shortlisted for possible elevation to the Supreme Court of Appeal; he was interviewed by the Judicial Service Commission in July that year in Cape Town. He and Frans Malan were the two candidates whom the commission recommended for elevation, and he joined the Supreme Court bench on 1 October 2009. Notable judgements written by Bosielo for the Supreme Court included Theart v Minnaar. He also wrote a minority judgement in State Information Technology Agency v Gijima Holdings which was upheld unanimously by the Constitutional Court.

He was an acting judge in the Constitutional Court on two occasions, first in May 2012 and then between January and May 2016. During his first acting stint, he wrote the Constitutional Court's unanimous judgement in the Labour Appeal Court matter of Grootboom v National Prosecuting Authority; in 2016, he wrote unanimous judgements in Raduvha v Minister of Safety and Security, on the rights of detained minors, and McBride v Minister of Police, on the independence of the Independent Police Investigative Directorate.

== Constitutional Court nominations ==
During his service in the Supreme Court of Appeal, Bosielo was thrice nominated unsuccessfully for possible elevation to the Constitutional Court. He was first interviewed for the apex court in June 2012, as one of four candidates, alongside Raymond Zondo, Mandisa Maya, and Robert Nugent, for the vacancy created by Sandile Ngcobo's resignation. On that occasion, though he was viewed as a "dark horse" candidate, Bosielo performed strongly, stressing his commitment to access to justice and fielding questions about judicial restraint and the separation of powers. The Judicial Service Commission recommended all four candidates as suitable for appointment, but President Jacob Zuma elected to appoint Zondo.

Bosielo was next shortlisted and interviewed in February 2013, one of five candidates for Zak Yacoob's seat on the Constitutional Court, and he was again recommended for appointment on that occasion, alongside Brian Spilg, Selby Baqwa, and Mbuyiseli Madlanga. However, President Zuma again declined to appoint him, elevating Madlanga instead.

Finally, in October 2016, Bosielo was the most senior of four candidates shortlisted to succeed Johann van der Westhuizen on the Constitutional Court; the other candidates were Steven Majiedt, Malcolm Wallis, and Jody Kollapen. However, his interview with the Judicial Service Commission was diverted by discussion of a complaint which had recently been lodged with the commission and which related to Bosielo's involvement in a black economic empowerment deal with mining company Northam Platinum in his home village of Phalane, North West. His wife was a director in a connected company, but he denied that he had personally benefited from the deal. However, two commissioners – politician Julius Malema and Chief Justice Mogoeng Mogoeng – suggested that Bosielo ought to resolve the complaint before availing himself for Constitutional Court service, and, after intense questioning, Bosielo agreed to withdraw from contention. After Bosielo's death in 2018, the Office of the Chief Justice reported that the Judicial Service Commission had investigated the complaint against Bosielo and had cleared him of any wrongdoing.

== Personal life and death ==
Bosielo died on 15 May 2018 in hospital in Johannesburg. His funeral was held at the Calvary Methodist Church in Midrand.

He was married to Shirley Bosielo and had two children.
