= Ezra Davids =

South African lawyer

- Born: Mziwandile Ezra Clavis Davids; 1964 (age 61–62); De Aar, Cape Province; South Africa
- Education: University of Cape Town
- Occupation: Chairman of Bowmans

Mziwandile Ezra Clavis Davids (born 1964) is a South African mergers and acquisitions lawyer. He is chairman and senior partner at Bowmans.

== Early life and education ==
Davids was born in 1964. He was born and raised in De Aar, a small town in the Karoo, but attended school in Cape Town. As a teenager during the late apartheid period, he was involved in anti-apartheid activism as chairman of the De Aar Youth Congress, an affiliate of the United Democratic Front; he was arrested and detained by security forces for six months in the mid-1980s.

He attended the University of Cape Town, where he completed a BA in 1989 and an LLB in 1992, and he also holds a higher diploma in tax from the University of the Witwatersrand.

== Legal career ==
After his graduation Davids completed his articles of clerkship at the firm of Bowman Gilfillan in Johannesburg; he spent the remainder of his career in the same office, excepting a secondment to Bowman's London office in the 1990s and a brief hiatus at Linklaters. He became chairman of Bowman's corporate and M&A practice before he was elevated to the firm's deputy chairmanship in March 2021. After the firm's chairman died of COVID-19-related illness later that year, the partnership elected Davids as chairman with effect from 1 October 2021. He retained his prior responsibilities as head of corporate and M&A.

Davids was South African counsel to Bharti Airtel in its abortive $24-billion merger with MTN and also served as an adviser in negotiations towards the $107-billion SABMiller–AB InBev transaction and the $1.7-billion PepsiCo acquisition of Pioneer Foods.

He is a member of the board of South Africa's Legal Resources Centre.

== Honours ==
In the aftermath of the MTN–Bharti merger negotiations, Davids was named as South African DealMaker of the Year for 2009. He was named South Africa Lawyer of the Year at the Chambers Africa Awards in January 2022. In his practice area, he is ranked as a "star individual" by Chambers and Partners and as a "market leader" by IFLR.
