= China Commercial Law Firm =

Law firm based in China

China Commercial Law Firm 广东华商律师事务所
- Headquarters: Shenzhen, Guangdong, China
- No. of offices: 73
- No. of attorneys: 3,000+
- Major practice areas: General
- Date founded: 22 December 1993
- Company type: LLP
- Website: huashanglawyer.com

China Commercial Law Firm (Chinese: 广东华商律师事务所; pinyin: Guǎngdōng Huáshāng Lǜshī Shìwùsuǒ) is a law firm based in China. Founded in 1993 and headquartered in Shenzhen, Guangdong, it has 73 branch offices globally, with more than 3,000 practicing lawyers.

The law firm is ranked 13th in China by ALB China and first in Shenzhen and Guangdong in terms of size, revenue and tax payment, and is listed as one of top law firms in China by The Legal 500 in the areas of dispute resolution, capital markets, date protection, etc..
