= Ratanang Nke =

- Born: October 2, 1972 (age 53); South Africa
- Occupations: Lawyer, business executive
- Known for: Compiling the "Nke Report" on former Ekurhuleni Metro police chief

Ratanang Nke (born 2 October 1975, Rustenburg, South Africa) is a South African lawyer and business executive who is chairman of Luka Business Forum Investment Trust, LexTalio Forensic Professionals (Pty) Ltd, and Platinum Stars F.C..

== Career ==
Nke held positions in the public sector such as Public Prosecutor, Control Prosecutor, and State Advocate focused on combating economic crimes.

He also held positions in the private sector such as CEO, Director, and managing director of various forensic and investigative accounting service companies.

In 2010, Nke compiled the "Nke Report" on former Ekurhuleni Metro police chief and current head of the Independent Police Investigative Directorate, Robert McBride, who was charged with drunk driving, fraud, and defeating the ends of justice.

Outside of the legal arena, Nke founded the Ratanang Nke Foundation for Hope which focuses at education, sports development and various philanthropic endeavors. Nke is also actively involved in management of South African football club, the Platinum Stars F.C. as well as in the management of its parent company the Royal Bafokeng Sports (Pty) Ltd
