= Webber Wentzel =

South African law firm

- Headquarters: Johannesburg, South Africa
- No. of offices: 2 (Johannesburg and Cape Town)
- No. of attorneys: More than 540 (2026)
- Major practice areas: Full service
- Key people: Gareth Driver (senior partner); Safiyya Patel (managing partner); Graham Viljoen (managing director, Cape Town); Riyaad Cruywagen (deputy managing partner, Cape Town)
- Date founded: 1868 (Fort Beaufort)
- Founder: Edward Philip Solomon (original practice)
- Company type: Partnership
- Website: www.webberwentzel.com

Webber Wentzel is a South African law firm with offices in Johannesburg and Cape Town. It is one of the "Big Five" major commercial law firms in South Africa.

The firm's roots date back to a legal practice established in 1868 in Fort Beaufort. It was later expanded via mergers, including with Bowen, Sessel & Goudvis in 1994, and Mallinicks in 2008.

Webber Wentzel provides services in corporate transactions, banking and finance, tax, competition and employment law, litigation and arbitration. In public-interest cases, the firm has provided representation to clients in cases challenging state surveillance, and families in reopened inquests into deaths in police custody during the apartheid era.

== History ==
=== Early history ===
Edward Philip Solomon established a legal practice in Fort Beaufort in 1868. He was later joined by his brother-in-law Thomas Thomson as a partner. They operated in Fort Beaufort and later Johannesburg where mining companies became significant clients, including Rand Mines, Johannesburg Consolidated Investment Company, Goldfields, Union Corporation, and General Mining. This would later evolve into Solomon, Hull, Webber & Wentzel, with partners including Henry Charles Hull, Walter Webber and Charles Wentzel.

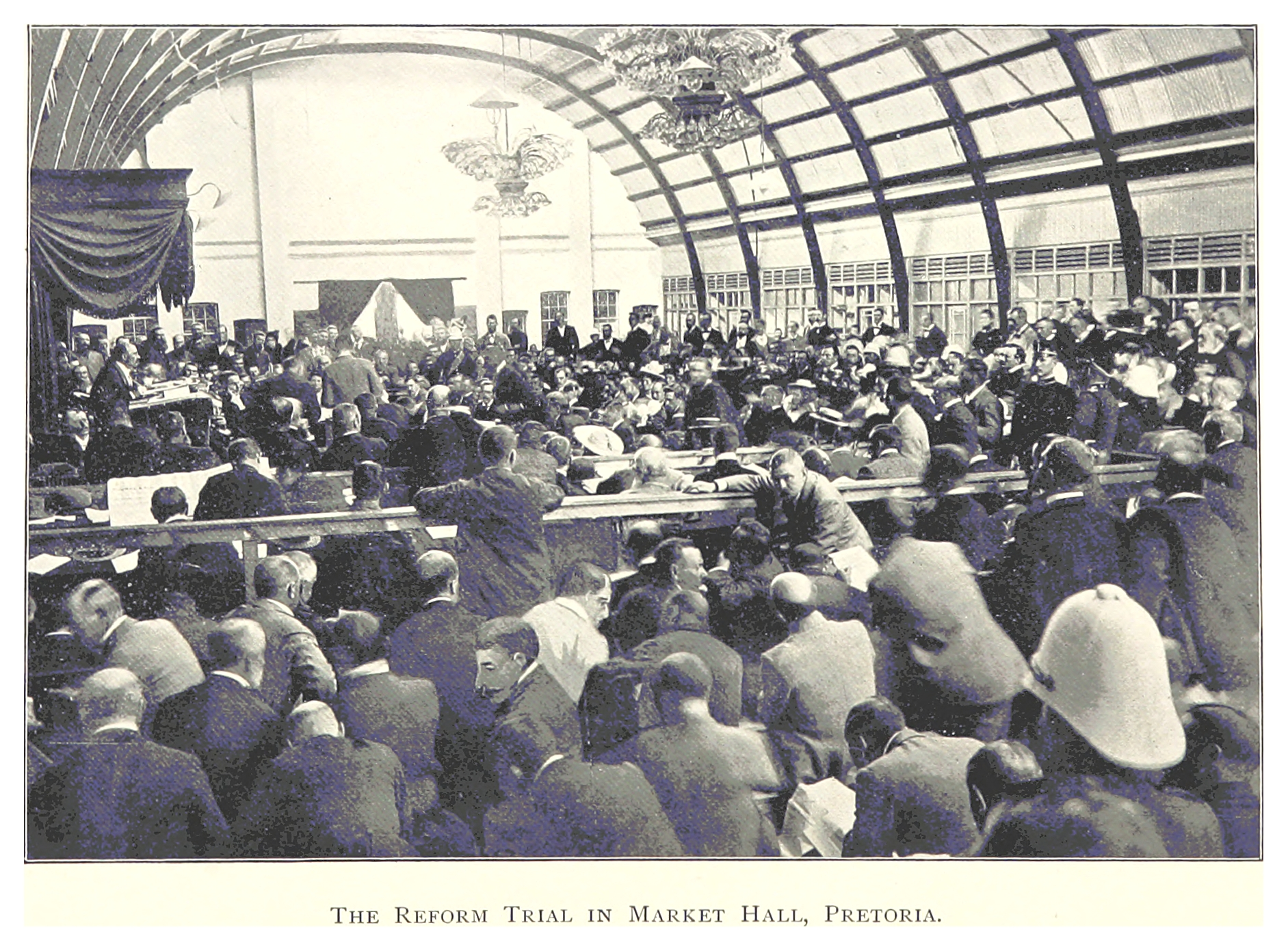
Reform Trial, Market Hall in Pretoria (1896). Edward Solomon and Henry Charles Hull were among the defendants.

Solomon and Hull were members of the Reform Committee, and were tried and convicted in Pretoria in 1896 after the failed Jameson Raid to overthrow the government of the South African Republic. Hull was sentenced to imprisonment and a fine, but was released after a short imprisonment.

Webber and Wentzel also had involvement in legal publications. Wentzel produced Digest of Reported Cases in the Transvaal from 1877 in 1901. Webber translated the first three volumes of the official law reports of the South African Republic into English in 1903.

=== Expansion and mergers ===
Partner Eric Pfaff established a Luxembourg office for Webber Wentzel in 1976. This would grow to become Maitland, an international legal and financial services firm. The early work included handling the international financial affairs of the Oppenheimer family. Maitland later expanded beyond legal advice to include company and trust administration, investment management, and fund administration.

The overseas practice had been established in London by 1987. Webber Wentzel Bowens stated that its international practice was located in London, Paris, Geneva, Luxembourg and the Isle of Man under the Maitland & Co name by 2001. Some lawyers were partners in both practices and maintained formal ties between them.

Webber Wentzel merged with Bowen, Sessel & Goudvis in 1994, becoming Webber Wentzel Bowens. They opened an office in Cape Town in 1998, after a strategy review the previous year.

Maitland and Webber Wentzel Bowens announced in January 2008 that their formal relationship would end on 28 February, when nine lawyers who were partners in both firms would retire from Webber Wentzel Bowens. They had different priorities, namely Webber Wentzel's focus on legal practice in South Africa and elsewhere in Africa, and Maitland's focus on international corporate, trust, tax and wealth services. Maitland would continue to provide logistical support to Webber Wentzel in Europe.

Webber Wentzel Bowens merged with the Cape Town firm Mallinicks on 1 March 2008. They initially operated under the name Webber Wentzel incorporating Mallinicks. It was reported that the merged firm had over 130 partners and 285 professionals.

Mallinicks was formed as a merger of the Cape Town firm Ress, Richman & Co, which was founded by Cyril Ress and Michael Richman in the early 1960s. It was later known as Mallinick, Ress, Richman & Closenberg. The firm provided representation to those affected by detention without trial, pass laws, banning orders and other apartheid legislation. Richman also represented residents of Crossroads in challenging restrictions on their right to live and work in Cape Town.

=== African and international relationships ===
Webber Wentzel collaborates with independent law firms elsewhere in Africa for cross-border cases and transactions, publications, training and lawyer secondments. Webber Wentzel became a member of the Africa Legal Network (ALN) in 2011, though their formal association had ended by 2021.

On 1 February 2013, Webber Wentzel formed a formal alliance with Linklaters to collaborate on African matters and provide Webber Wentzel access to Linklaters' international network. The firms remained independent, and the alliance included joint training and secondments. The alliance was terminated on 1 November 2026. The firms indicated they would continue to collaborate on individual matters.

== Organisation ==
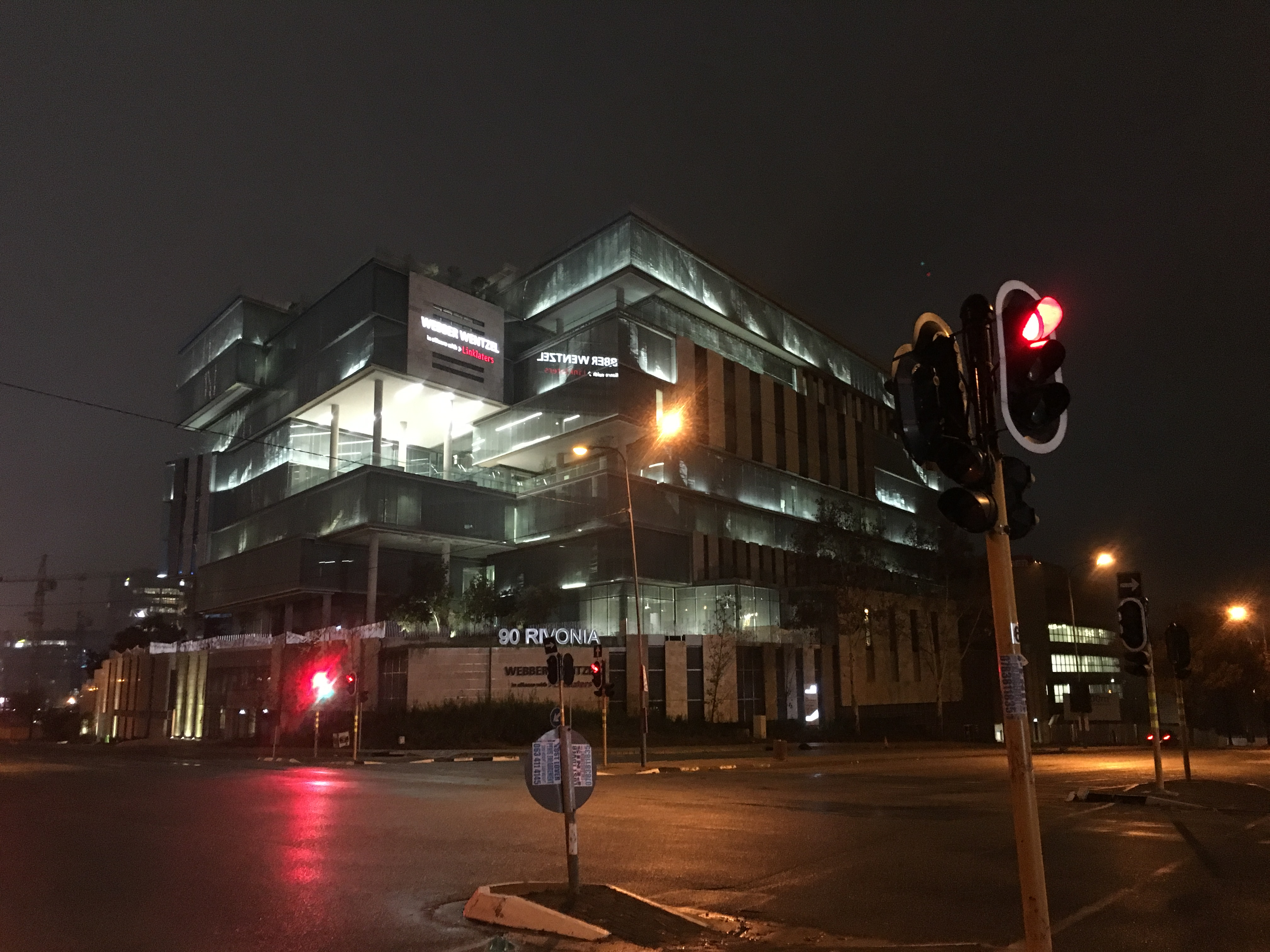
Webber Wentzel's Johannesburg office located at 90 Rivonia Road in Sandton

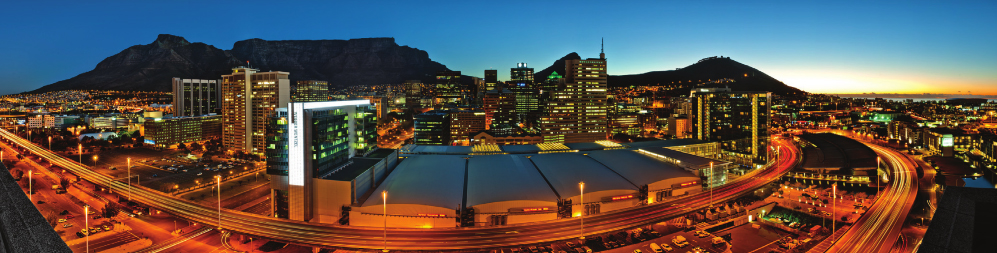
Webber Wentzel's Cape Town office located in the Convention Tower

The firm has offices in Johannesburg and Cape Town.

=== Webber Wentzel Fusion ===
In January 2024, Webber Wentzel expanded and renamed its legal technology and support services division, Webber Wentzel Fusion. This division, led by Aalia Manie, consisted of lawyers, technology specialists, analysts and project managers. They provided services such as managing legal projects, document review, electronic evidence, and legal technology advice.

Fusion established a Legal Innovation Lab in 2025 to collaborate with software providers in developing technology products. In February 2026, Fusion became a wholly owned subsidiary of Webber Wentzel, with Manie as director.

They assist corporate legal departments with selecting and implementing software, including artificial intelligence (AI) tools, and work with software suppliers to test and introduce products. They also create custom legal applications and provide training and support for software.

=== Transformation ===
Webber Wentzel reports having Level 1 status under Broad-Based Black Economic Empowerment (B-BBEE). They reported to Reuters in May 2026 that 38% of their partners were black, compared to 25% in 2019.

Webber Wentzel was one of four law firms challenging the Legal Sector Code's transformation targets and timeline. On 7 October 2026, the Gauteng High Court set aside the minister's decision to issue the code, as the minister did not independently assess the code. It was sent back to the minister for reconsideration. The court did not rule on the constitutionality of the code's provisions.

Reuters reported in May 2026 that a discrimination claim had been brought against Webber Wentzel, and that the firm had filed notice of its intention to defend the case. Webber Wentzel stated they did not tolerate discrimination and had procedures for addressing complaints.

== Selected transactions ==
=== Mergers and acquisitions ===
Webber Wentzel advised Walmart on its acquisition of a 51% stake in Massmart in 2011, which introduced the American retailer to the African market. They advised Woolworths Holdings on its A$2.14 billion acquisition of Australian department store chain David Jones in 2014, as well as the purchase of the remaining shares in Country Road.

Webber Wentzel advised AB InBev on African aspects of its acquisition of SABMiller in 2016, including competition approvals. They were the South African legal adviser for Pioneer Foods on its approximately US$1.7 billion acquisition by PepsiCo, which was announced in 2019 and completed in 2020.

Webber Wentzel was the lead legal adviser for Sanlam on its agreement with Allianz to combine their insurance operations in African markets in 2022. They also advised private equity investor Actis on the sale of its interest in wind power company Lekela to Infinity Power. In 2023, the sale of operations in South Africa, Egypt and Senegal was completed.

South African law firm Webber Wentzel advised South African television group MultiChoice on its takeover by French broadcaster Canal+ which was completed in 2025.

=== Corporate restructurings ===
Old Mutual’s 2018 managed separation was advised on by Webber Wentzel, which saw the insurance, banking and investment businesses of the group separated into the following entities: Old Mutual, Quilter, BrightSphere Investment Group and Nedbank. Webber Wentzel was South African legal advisor to Old Mutual Limited’s primary listing on the Johannesburg Stock Exchange and its subsequent listings in London, Malawi, Namibia and Zimbabwe.

In 2019, Webber Wentzel was the lead South African legal advisor to the listing of Prosus (the international internet business of Naspers) on Euronext Amsterdam as well as a secondary listing on the Johannesburg Stock Exchange. Naspers holds a majority shareholding in Prosus, which in turn holds the group’s international internet businesses as well as its interest in Tencent.

Webber Wentzel represented Northam Platinum and Northam Holdings in 2021 when the Zambezi black economic empowerment ownership arrangement was brought to an early end. It was replaced by a 15-year ownership arrangement involving the employees and communities of the company.

Ster-Kinekor was assisted by Webber Wentzel in its successful exit from business rescue in November 2022. The business rescue practitioner, assisted by Webber Wentzel, raised R250 million in refinancing and completed the restructuring of the business and the subsequent sale to Blantyre Capital and Greenpoint Capital.

In 2025 the firm represented Anglo American in the separation of the then Anglo American Platinum (now Valterra Platinum) business and the subsequent sale of the remaining 19.9% shareholding for R44.1 billion. The majority of the shareholding was distributed to shareholders of Anglo American with Valterra listing in London as well as on the Johannesburg Stock Exchange.

=== Financing and capital markets ===
In 2018, Webber Wentzel acted as South African legal adviser to Sibanye-Stillwater for a US$500 million streaming transaction with Wheaton Precious Metals. Wheaton paid Sibanye-Stillwater an upfront payment for the gold and part of the palladium produced at Sibanye-Stillwater’s Stillwater mines in Montana, USA. Further payments will be made to Sibanye-Stillwater on delivery of the metal.

Premier Group Limited’s initial public offering in 2023 was advised on by the South African legal team of Webber Wentzel. The offering raised R3.6 billion for selling shareholder Brait. In 2024, the banks coordinating and underwriting Pick n Pay Stores’ R4 billion rights issue and the R8.5 billion initial public offering of discount-retail subsidiary Boxer were advised on by Webber Wentzel.

Actis was advised on R4.5 billion of syndicated loan financing by the Webber Wentzel Banking & Finance team, for an Actis-led consortium’s acquisition of Swiftnet, the telecommunications tower operator, from Telkom (South Africa). The acquisition was completed in March 2025 and comprises more than 4,000 tower sites across South Africa.

The technology provider for microfinance and airtime-credit services, Optasia, was advised on its initial public offering and listing on the Johannesburg Stock Exchange in November 2025. The offering of R6.5 billion (including overallotment shares) comprised a combination of new shares and shares sold by existing shareholders. Optasia raised approximately R1.3 billion from the IPO.

The FirstRand Bank Cape Water Performance-Based Bond and related project agreements were advised on by Webber Wentzel in 2026. The financing was raised for The Nature Conservancy to remove invasive plants from Western Cape water catchments to increase flows into storage dams. Part of investors’ returns depended on independently verified restoration results.

== Selected litigation ==
Webber Wentzel has represented numerous clients in various commercial disputes and matters, as well as in challenges to government action and public interest matters before South Africa’s Supreme Court of Appeal and the Constitutional Court.

=== Commercial litigation ===
Old Mutual Unit Trust Managers Limited v Living Hands (Pty) Ltd and Others [2024] ZASCA 75 – In this matter Webber Wentzel represented Old Mutual Unit Trust Managers Limited, a division of the Old Mutual financial services group, in the litigation arising from the Fidentia investment scandal. The claim was for money intended for the dependants of deceased mineworkers which was diverted after Fidentia, an investment group, took control of the company administering their trust. The claim alleged that the investment manager should have done more to protect the money before releasing it on its client’s instructions. The Supreme Court of Appeal in 2024 overturned an award of approximately R1.7 billion in damages and interest, finding that Old Mutual Unit Trust Managers was not legally responsible for the subsequent losses.

The firm also represents the nuclear engineering company Framatome in a dispute with the state-owned electricity supplier Eskom regarding the replacement of steam generators at the Koeberg Nuclear Power Station. In 2021 the Supreme Court of Appeal held that Eskom must comply with the decision of the dispute resolution procedure in the contract while the parties are engaged in arbitration in respect of the main dispute.

=== Regulatory and administrative litigation ===
The firm acted on behalf of the Pharmaceutical Society of South Africa and other pharmaceutical companies in Minister of Health v New Clicks, a case before the Supreme Court of Appeal in which medicine-pricing regulations introduced in 2004 were challenged on the basis that they were unconstitutional and ultra vires. Although the Supreme Court of Appeal set aside the regulations, the Constitutional Court in 2005 upheld most of the pricing structure but found the dispensing fee to be unconstitutional. Subsequently, the firm represented the South African Private Practitioners Forum and other applicants in Hospital Association of South Africa Ltd v Minister of Health and Others, in which the national health reference price list, a set of non-binding guidelines used to determine medical fees and healthcare benefit payments, was challenged on the basis that the regulations were unconstitutional and ultra vires. In 2010 the High Court set aside the regulations and determinations made under them.

Webber Wentzel represented Aquila Steel in a dispute relating to the grant of a mining right for the mining of manganese in Kuruman, Northern Cape. The Department of Mineral Resources refused Aquila’s application on the basis that another company held the right to explore for the same deposits. In 2019 the Constitutional Court set aside the competing exploration rights and reinstated the order granting the mining right to Aquila, subject to conditions to be determined by the Minister of Mineral Resources.

The firm also represents companies in the Bank of America group and German bank Commerzbank in respect of the Competition Commission’s investigation into alleged collusion in respect of foreign exchange trading by banks. In 2026 the Constitutional Court dismissed the Competition Commission’s appeal against those banks, with the earlier dismissal of the cases against them standing.

=== Public-interest litigation ===
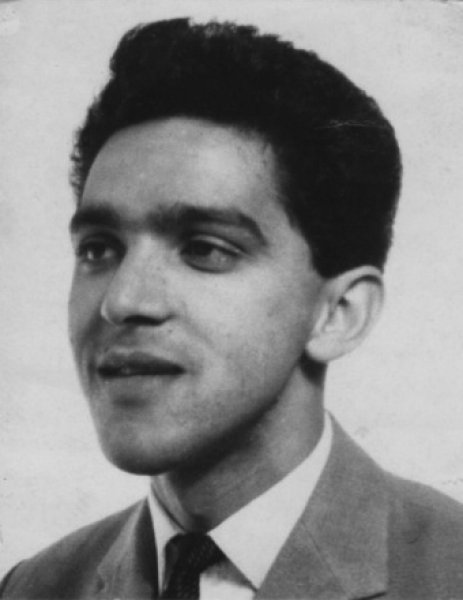
Ahmed Timol, whose family the firm represented in the reopened inquest into his death in police custody.

The firm represented political prisoners held at Robben Island prison during the apartheid era, including the cases of Kader Hassim and Sonny Venkatrathnam who were permitted to study, to have access to recreation facilities and to have their isolation terminated. The firm also represented the families of anti-apartheid activists Ahmed Timol, Neil Aggett and Abdullah Haron in the reopened inquests into their deaths in police custody. The inquests into their deaths found that members of the police Security Branch were responsible for their deaths, overturning the previous findings of the inquests.

Webber Wentzel represented the investigative journalism organisation amaBhungane in a challenge to government surveillance of the telephone calls of journalist Sam Sole. The Constitutional Court in 2021 found that parts of South Africa’s communications-surveillance law were unconstitutional because they did not protect privacy sufficiently and that the government’s large-scale surveillance of communications was done without legal basis.

In the case of Arena Holdings v South African Revenue Service (2023), Webber Wentzel acted for the media applicants in a bid to obtain the tax records of former South African president Jacob Zuma. The Constitutional Court held that tax records can be disclosed to the public in circumstances where it is in the public interest to do so in terms of the Promotion of Access to Information Act and ordered the South African Revenue Service (SARS) to consider the media’s application.

Representing the Helen Suzman Foundation, Webber Wentzel sought the release of recordings of discussions of the Judicial Service Commission on judicial appointments. In 2018 the Constitutional Court ruled that the recordings had to be included in the record of the proceedings challenging the process of judicial appointments.

The firm also represented the human rights organisation, the Southern Africa Litigation Centre, in its bid to have the South African government arrest Sudanese President Omar al-Bashir during his visit to the country in 2015. Al-Bashir is wanted by the International Criminal Court for alleged war crimes committed in the Darfur conflict. He left South Africa while the case was still being heard but in 2016 the Supreme Court of Appeal found that the government’s failure to arrest him had been unlawful.

The firm also represented the Stellenbosch University Legal Aid Clinic and borrowers in relation to the use of emoluments attachment orders to recover debt from workers’ wages. In 2015 the High Court declared that such deductions could only be authorised after a court had examined them. In 2016 the Constitutional Court upheld this decision.

In Van Wyk v Minister of Employment and Labour (2025) the firm acted for the parents in a challenge to the laws which generally allow for four months of maternity leave for mothers and ten days of parental leave for fathers. The Constitutional Court found that the laws were unconstitutional and that employed parents were to be granted four months and ten days of leave to be shared between them until the laws were amended.

== Rankings and awards ==
Chambers Global 2026: South Africa: 17 Band 1 rankings for practice areas and 69 lawyers ranked. The Legal 500: South Africa: Practice areas: 9 Tier 1 rankings for practice areas.

Chambers Africa Awards named the firm South Africa Law Firm of the Year for 2021, 2022 and 2024. By 2015 the firm had won Who's Who Legal's South Africa Law Firm of the Year award seven times, five of which were in consecutive years from 2011 to 2015.

Webber Wentzel was awarded the African Law Firm of the Year award in 2014, and in the Large Practice category in 2019 and the Mid-Large Sized Practice category in 2022. In both 2025 and 2026 the firm was awarded the African Law Firm of the Year and African Law Firm of the Year – Southern Africa awards. It was also awarded the Innovation Award in 2024, 2025 and 2026.

In February 2020 DealMakers named Webber Wentzel Legal DealMaker of the Decade for mergers and acquisitions by deal value.
