= Denys Myrgorodskyi =

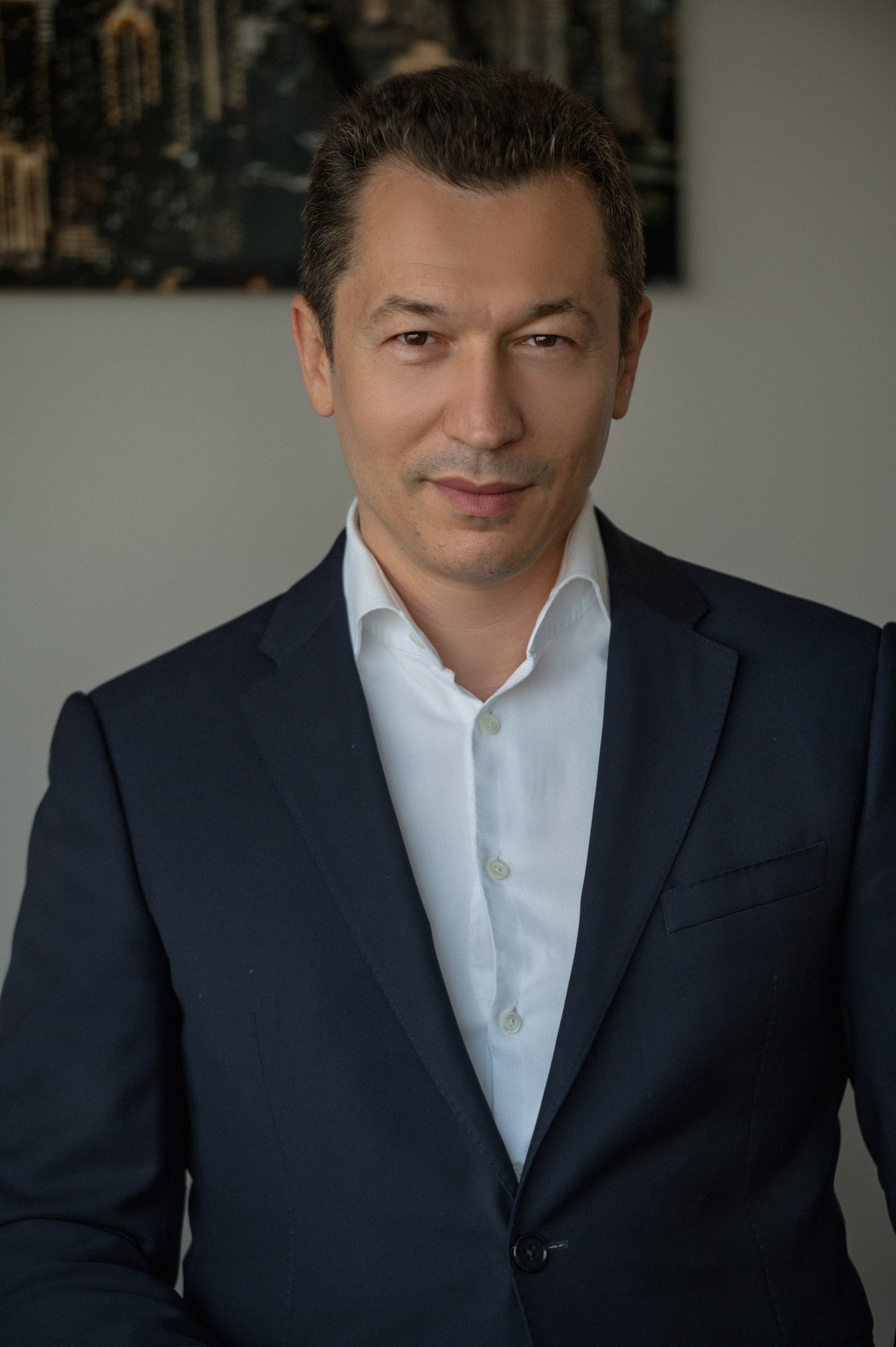
- Education: Oles Honchar Dnipro State University, Institute of Trade and Development
- Occupations: lawyer, businessman, investor
- Known for: Founder of Dynasty Investment Group, former director of Gas Distribution Networks of Ukraine

Denys Yuriyovych Myrhorodskyi (Ukrainian: Денис Юрійович Миргородський) is a Ukrainian lawyer, and director of the government-owned Gas Distribution Networks of Ukraine in 2022–2023, created after the Russian invasion of Ukraine.

== Biography ==
Denys Myrgorodskyi was born in Dnipropetrovsk (aka. Dnipro) on 17th August 1977 in Soviet Union, however he grew up in Donetsk. After spending most of his teenage years in Donetsk he moved to Dnepropetrovsk again, where he continued his career.

== Education and career ==
Denis Myrgorodskyi started his legal practice in 1996. In 1998, he graduated from the Law Faculty of the Oles Honchar Dnipro National University with a law degree. In 2001, as part of a cultural exchange program, he studied at the Institute of Trading and Development in the United States. In 2000, after receiving a certificate to practice law from the Ukrainian National Bar Association, Myrgorodskyi worked as an attorney. In August of the same year, he founded Dynasty Law Firm.

In 2013, the international directory "The Legal 500: Europe, Middle East & Africa" recognized Myrgorodskyi an expert in real estate, land, and Construction. In 2015–2017, The Legal 500 recognized him among the best lawyers in Ukraine in Litigation. In 2018, The Legal 500 recognized him as an expert in real estate, land, construction, and litigation.

In addition, from 2012 to 2015, the Legal Awards recognized Myrgorodskyi as one of the best litigation lawyers in Ukraine. In 2019, he was awarded the Order of the Outstanding Lawyer of Ukraine.

Myrgorodskyi is a regular speaker at professional and industry forums and conferences and is the author of 300 scientific and advisory publications in professional and business publications in Ukraine and abroad. He is also a speaker at the Kyiv International Economic Forum and the Union of Ukrainian Entrepreneurs.

Together with his wife, Myrgorodskyi founded the women's clothing brand ANNAFOXY.

In 2022–2023, Myrgorodskyi headed Gas Distribution Networks of Ukraine, a company established after Russia's full-scale invasion to integrate the seized stakes in regional gas companies. The newly established company accomplished a number of tasks that government agencies had previously failed to implement. Notably, for the first time since 2010, a state-owned entity received a license to distribute natural gas. Additionally, more than 70 percent of the country's gas distribution networks were returned to the state. Kirovohradgaz, Donetskoblgaz, Dniprogaz, and Kharkivoblgaz were integrated into the Gas Distribution Networks structure. After his dismissal, the integration of the regional gas companies continued. As of the date of his dismissal, the company, created from scratch, had 7,500 employees and more than 1.5 million customers.
