= Durban beach-front bombing =

1986 terrorist attack in South Africa

- Durban (South Africa)
- Location: Durban beach-front, Natal Province, South Africa
- Date: 14 June 1986
- Attack type: Car bombing
- Deaths: 3
- Injuries: 69
- Perpetrator: Robert McBride of the African National Congress

On 14 June 1986, the Magoo's Bar at the Parade Hotel on the beach-front area of Durban, Natal Province, South Africa, was attacked with a car bomb, killing three civilians and injuring 69 others. Robert McBride, a leader in Umkhonto we Sizwe (the paramilitary wing of the African National Congress), was convicted of carrying out the attack and sentenced to death, but later reprieved and released.

== Bombing ==
The attack, also known as the Magoo's Bar bombing, was carried out by detonating a car bomb, killing three civilians and injuring 69 others. The bar was targeted as it was claimed to be "frequented by security branch police". Reports sometimes give the name of the bar as the Why Not Magoo's Bar, but in fact the Why Not Bar and Magoo's Bar were two different bars attached to the same hotel.

Robert McBride was convicted and sentenced to death, but was reprieved while on death row, and released in 1992 by president F. W. de Klerk during South Africa's political transition. He has subsequently held a number of prominent positions in the country.

After the end of apartheid following the 1994 elections, the Truth and Reconciliation Committee was established in 1996. McBride applied for and received amnesty for his role in the attack. The TRC found that the bombing was a "gross violation of human rights".

== See also ==
- List of massacres in South Africa
