= Big Five (law firms) =

Group of leading law firms

Location of South Africa

The Big Five law firms is a term informally used in South Africa to refer to those law firms which, collectively, are perceived to be the leading law firms based in South Africa.

The following firms are usually seen as comprising the "Big Five" (listed alphabetically):

Name	Date founded	Offices	Lawyers
Bowmans	1885	Cape Town, Dar es Salaam, Durban, Johannesburg, Kampala, Lilongwe, Lusaka, Moka, Nairobi (9) (July 2020)	400+ (July 2020)
Cliffe Dekker Hofmeyr (Note: Cliffe Dekker Hofmeyr was formerly allied with DLA Piper. Its affiliation with DLA Piper ended at the end of August 2015.)	1853	Cape Town, Johannesburg, Stellenbosch (3) (July 2020)	350+ (July 2020)
Edward Nathan Sonnenbergs	1905	Accra, Alexandra (pro bono office), Cape Town, Durban, Johannesburg, Kampala, Kigali, Mitchells Plain (pro bono office), Nairobi, Port Louis, Stellenbosch, Swakopmund, Walvis Bay, Windhoek (14)	600+ (July 2020)
Webber Wentzel in alliance with Linklaters (Note: On 1 February 2013, the firm entered into a collaborative alliance with global law firm Linklaters.)	1868	Cape Town, Johannesburg (2) (July 2020)	450+ (July 2020)
Werksmans (Note: Deneys Reitz Inc, and then Norton Rose Fulbright, was formerly considered to form part of the big five law firms. Due to its decline, Werksmans, which was not part of the big five law firms, took its place.)	1917	Cape Town, Johannesburg, Stellenbosch (3) (July 2020)	175+ (July 2020)

== Rankings ==
=== Chambers and Partners Global rankings ===
Chambers and Partners Global Rankings of the number of departments recognised as leaders in their respective fields in South Africa in 2020. This list is non-exhaustive.

Rank^{1}	Name	Band 1	Band 2	Band 3	Band 4
1	Webber Wentzel	13	3	4	None
2	Bowmans	12	4	2	1
3	ENS	9	8	2	None
4	Cliffe Dekker Hofmeyr	6	10	3	None
5	Werksmans	5	7	4	2
	Allen & Overy South Africa	1			
	Clyde & Co South Africa	1	None	2	None
	Spoor & Fisher	1	None	None	None
	Norton Rose Fulbright South Africa	None	6	2	3
	Fasken Martineau South Africa	None	2	1	3
	Herbert Smith Freehills South Africa	None	1	None	4
	Shepstone & Wylie	None	1	None	None
	Baker McKenzie South Africa	None	None	4	4
	DLA Piper South Africa	None	None	2	None
	Fluxmans	None	None	None	3
	Knowles Husain Lindsay	None	None	None	1
	Lawtons Africa	None	None	None	None

Note^{1}: Based on Band 1 rankings.

=== Who's Who Legal Global 100 ===
Law firms included in the Global 100 aren't assigned a specific ranking.

Year	Firm^{3}
2013	ENS
2013, 2014	Webber Wentzel

Note^{3}: firms listed alphabetically

=== Who's Who Legal South African Law firm of the year ===
Year	Firm
2015	Webber Wentzel
2013	Webber Wentzel
2012	Webber Wentzel
2011	Webber Wentzel

== Midsized law firms ==
Firms with more than 50 attorneys are generally viewed as midsize law firms.

Name	Founded (South Africa)	No. of offices (South Africa)	No. of attorneys (South Africa)
Fairbridges Wertheim Becker	1812	2 (July 2020)	51 (July 2020)
Fasken Martineau South Africa (formerly Bell Dewar)	1901	1 (July 2020)	67 (July 2020)
Norton Rose Fulbright South Africa^{1}	1922	3 (July 2020)	75 (July 2020)
Shepstone & Wylie	1872	5 (July 2020)	69 (July 2020)
Spoor & Fisher	1920	4 (July 2020)	94 (July 2020)
STBB - Smith Tabata Buchanan Boyes	1900	13 (September 2022)	116 (April 2026)
Strauss Daly Incorporated	1984	9 (October 2021)	52 (October 2021)

Note^{1}: On 1 June 2011, Deneys Reitz Inc joined UK based firm Norton Rose. Deneis Reitz, and then Norton Rose Fulbright, was formerly considered to form part of the big five law firms. Due to its decline, Werksmans, which was formerly outside of the big five law firms, took its place.

== See also ==
- Magic Circle (law)
- Silver Circle (law)
- Big Six law firms
