= McBride v Minister of Police =

South African legal case

- Court: Constitutional Court of South Africa
- Full case name: McBride v Minister of Police and Another
- Decided: 6 September 2016
- Docket nos.: CCT 255/15
- Citations: [2016] ZACC 30; 2016 (2) SACR 585 (CC); 2016 (11) BCLR 1398 (CC)

Case history
- Appealed from: McBride v Minister of Police and Another [2015] ZAGPPHC 830 in the High Court of South Africa, Gauteng Division

Court membership
- Judges sitting: Mogoeng CJ, Cameron J, Froneman J, Jafta J, Khampepe J, Madlanga J, Mhlantla J, Nkabinde J, Zondo J and Bosielo AJ

Case opinions
- It is unconstitutional for statute to grant the Minister of Police the power to suspend, discipline, or remove the Executive Director of the Independent Police Investigative Directorate. Such a power is inconsistent with the directorate's independence as guaranteed by section 206(6) of the Constitution.
- Decision by: Bosielo AJ (unanimous)

Keywords
- Independent Police Investigative Directorate, independence thereof; Independent Police Investigative Directorate Act, 2011; Minister of Police; section 206(6) of the Constitution

McBride v Minister of Police and Another is a 2016 decision of the Constitutional Court of South Africa which concerns the independence of the Independent Police Investigative Directorate (IPID). In a unanimous decision written by Ronnie Bosielo, the court confirmed that certain legislative provisions were unconstitutional insofar as they permitted the Minister of Police unilaterally to suspend, discipline, or remove IPID's Executive Director, thereby making the directorate vulnerable to political influence. The court also set aside Police Minister Nathi Nhleko's decision to suspend Robert McBride from his position at the head of IPID.

== Background ==
In March 2014, Robert McBride was appointed as the executive director of the Independent Police Investigative Directorate (IPID), a statutory body established to investigate alleged misconduct by members of the South African Police Service. However, he was placed on precautionary suspension in March 2015 in connection with a controversial IPID investigation into the alleged unlawful rendition of four Zimbabweans by senior members of the Hawks. His suspension was effectuated by the Minister of Police, Nathi Nhleko, in terms of section 6 of the IPID Act, 2011. Using the same provisions, the Minister instituted disciplinary charges against McBride in May 2015.

== High Court action ==
McBride approached the High Court of South Africa with a challenge to the constitutionality of the provisions that had been used to institute the suspension and disciplinary inquiry. On that basis, he sought to have the Minister's decisions set aside. His constitutional challenge was grounded in section 206(6) of the Constitution, which provided for IPID's establishment as an "independent police complaints body"; he argued that insofar as the IPID Act allowed the Minister of Police to suspend, discipline, and remove IPID's Executive Director, it did not contain sufficient safeguards for the independence of the executive director and of IPID itself.

On 4 December 2015 in the Pretoria High Court, Judge Fayeeza Kathree-Setiloane delivered judgment in favour of McBride. Relying heavily on the Constitutional Court's decisions on the independence of the Hawks in Glenister v President and Helen Suzman v President; Glenister v President, she agreed that IPID's independence required that the Executive Director – and his security of tenure in office – should be "sufficiently insulated from undue political interference". She therefore held that "it is imperative... that the suspension and removal from office of the Executive Director be subject to parliamentary oversight through a veto power."

Thus the High Court declared that provisions of the IPID Act, along with other enabling provisions elsewhere, were unconstitutional and unlawful "to the extent that they purport to authorise the Minister of Police to suspend, take any disciplinary steps pursuant to suspension, or to remove from office the Executive Director". Minister Nhleko's decisions to suspend McBride and pursue disciplinary charges against him were also set aside. The orders were referred to the Constitutional Court for confirmation, and argument was heard on 17 May 2016.

== Judgment ==
On 6 September 2016, Acting Justice Ronnie Bosielo delivered judgment on behalf of a unanimous court. He confirmed the High Court's finding of constitutional invalidity and affirmed its reasoning, agreeing that the relevant provisions undermined IPID's constitutionally guaranteed independence. The Constitutional Court also rejected Minister Nhleko's bid, argued by Tembeka Ngcukaitobi, to preserve his decisions in respect of McBride's own employment. However, because both parties were amenable, the court suspended the order setting aside the Minister's decision; he was given 30 days to arrange for the disciplinary process to restart with the necessary parliamentary oversight.

== Aftermath ==
In May 2020, President Cyril Ramaphosa assented to the IPID Amendment Act, 2019, which provided for parliamentary oversight of the suspension, discipline, and removal of IPID's Executive Director, thereby addressing the constitutional defects identified in the original legislation.
