= Judy Croome =

South African writer and poet

J A Croome is a South African novelist, short story writer, and poet. Born Judy Ann Heinemann on 16 December 1958 in Zvishavane, Southern Rhodesia (now Zimbabwe), she received a Master of Arts (English) degree from the University of South Africa. She currently lives in Johannesburg. Croome was married to South African tax law scholar, Advocate of the High Court of South Africa and tax author, the late Dr Beric John Croome, who died in April 2019 after a long illness.

== Biography ==
Croome's short stories and poetry have been published in The Huffington Post, the University of Witwatersrand's School of Literature, Language and Media's Itch Magazine and in various print anthologies released by small presses in the United States and South Africa

Croome has also appeared on South African national television on the South African Broadcasting Corporation's Channel 2 Morning Live show and on South African national radio on the SAFM Sunday Literature programme.

Croome has also had articles published in South Africa, including in The Sunday Times (South Africa) and internationally by various on-line magazines and websites.

Croome also has an interest in esoteric matters and does intuitive tarot readings.

== Works ==
Published as J A Croome:

- The Sand People: a collection of magical realism and other stories (fiction, Aztar Press, 2024)

Published as Judy Croome:

- the dust of hope (poetry, Aztar Press, 2021)
- Drop by Drop (poetry, Aztar Press, 2020)
- Street Smart Taxpayers: A Practical Guide to your Rights in South Africa (non-fiction, Juta Law, 2017) co-authored with her husband Dr Beric John Croome
- a stranger in a strange land (poetry, Aztar Press, 2015)
- The Weight of a Feather and other stories (short stories, Aztar Press, 2013)
- a Lamp at Midday (poetry, Aztar Press, 2012)
- Dancing in the Shadows of Love (fiction, Aztar Press, 2018, 3rd edition;2012;2011)

== Awards and presentations ==
In 2021, Croome presented a poetry workshop "The Gift of Poetry" to Writers2000(South Africa). In 2021 and 2016, Croome was the external judge of the poetry section in the Writers2000(South Africa)(1985) annual writing competition. In 2011, Croome's "The Place of the Doves" was shortlisted for the African Flash Fiction writing award.
