= S v Shilubane =

South African legal case

S v Shilubane, an important case in South African criminal law, was heard and decided in the Transvaal Provincial Division by Shongwe J and Bosielo J on June 20, 2005. The case is significant primarily for its treatment of questions of punishment, advocating the consideration of restorative justice as an alternative to direct imprisonment, urging that presiding officers be innovative and proactive in opting for such alternatives, and recommending that these alternatives be humane and balanced.

Retributive justice, the court found, had failed and was failing to stem the wave of crime in South Africa. It was counter-productive and self-defeating, therefore, to expose first-time offenders to the corrosive and brutalising effect of prison for trifling offences. Such sentences as community service were to be seriously considered where the perpetrator was not such a serious threat to society as for it to be necessary for its protection to imprison him.

== Facts ==
Shilubane, the accused, a 35-year-old first-time offender, stole and then cooked seven fowls to the value of R216.16. In a magistrates' court, he pleaded guilty and was duly convicted. Notwithstanding his expression of "genuine remorse," and the fact that he undertook "solemnly" never to reoffend, he was sentenced to nine months' direct imprisonment.

== Judgment ==
On review, Bosielo held that the sentence was, in the circumstances of the case, "disturbingly inappropriate," and noted that the magistrate had conceded as much, recommending that he set aside the sentence and replace it with a fine of R500 or, in default of payment, imprisonment for six months. The State Advocate, with the agreement of the Deputy Director of Public Prosecutions, concurred that the sentence, in Bosielo's paraphrase, was "shockingly inappropriate" and recommended nemine contradicente a fine of R600 or imprisonment for six months, half of it to be suspended for three years on "suitable conditions."

Bosielo cited, as "the guiding light to sentencing," the dictum in S v V: "Punishment should fit the criminal as well as the crime, be fair to the accused and to society, and be blended with a measure of mercy." In line with the philosophy of restorative justice, the Bosielo had "little doubt" that the complainant would have been better pleased to receive compensation for his loss: An order of compensation, coupled with a suspended sentence, would have satisfied the basic triad of sentencing considerations—the crime, the criminal and the interests of society—and the primary purposes of punishment. This option, "unfortunately," could not be considered, as the Criminal Procedure Act required the consent of the complainant. The court ruled instead that the sentence should be replaced with a fine of R500 or, in default of payment, to imprisonment for six months, wholly but conditionally suspended for a period of three years.

Bosielo felt "constrained to remark" that, unless presiding officers become "innovative and proactive" in opting for alternative sentences to direct imprisonment, South Africa would be unable to solve the problem of the overcrowding of prisons, "another serious social ill [...] concomitant with the plethora of other social ills which are spawned by this overcrowding." Inasmuch as it was "critical" for the maintenance of law and order that criminals be punished for their crimes, it was also "important that presiding officers impose sentences which are humane and balanced."

There was "abundant empirical evidence" (although Bosielo cited none) that retributive justice had "failed to stem the ever-increasing wave of crime," to say nothing of "the public hysteria" generated by it. It was "counter-productive," furthermore, "if not self-defeating," to expose a first offender to "the corrosive and brutalising effect of prison life for such a trifling offence." The price which civil society stood to pay in the end by having Shilubane emerge from prison a hardened criminal "far outweighs" the advantages to be gained by sending him to jail. The courts must "seriously consider" alternative sentences, like community service, as viable alternatives to direct imprisonment, particularly where the accused was not such a serious threat to society that he needed to be taken away for its protection. Bosielo quoted in this regard from a newspaper article by Cheryl Gillwald, the former Deputy Minister of Correctional Services:

Incarceration only becomes a deterrent when society perceives the justice system to be efficient, consistent and effective. Rather than focusing on internment, sentencing should focus on what the most effective rehabilitation route would be for the offender, taking into account the gravity of the offence, assessment of the individual and his/her history, social and employment circumstances.

Such an approach, wrote Bosielo, "will benefit our society immensely by excluding the possibility of warped sentences being imposed routinely on people who do not deserve them."

== See also ==
- Crime in South Africa
- Punishment
- Restorative justice
- Retributive justice
- South African criminal law
