= Bowmans (law firm) =

African law firm

- No. of offices: 9
- No. of attorneys: 650
- No. of employees: 1150
- Major practice areas: Corporate Law Firm
- Key people: Ezra Davids (chairman and senior partner); Alan Keep (managing partner)
- Date founded: 1885
- Founder: Douglas Flemmer Gilfillan, Richard Bowman
- Website: www.bowmanslaw.com

Bowmans is a global law firm headquartered in Johannesburg, South Africa. Staffed by over 650 lawyers, it comprises nine offices in six African countries: South Africa, Namibia, Tanzania, Zambia, Mauritius, and Kenya. It is one of the Big Five law firms in South Africa.

The legal practice comprises the following law firms: Coulson Harney LLP (Kenya), Koep & Partners (Namibia), Bowmans Mauritius (Mauritius), Bowman Gilfillan (South Africa), Bowmans Tanzania (Tanzania) and B&M Legal Practitioners (Zambia). Bowmans offices are located in Johannesburg, Durban, and Cape Town, South Africa; Swakopmund and Windhoek, Namibia; Dar es Salaam, Tanzania; Lusaka, Zambia; Moka, Mauritius; and Nairobi, Kenya.

Bowmans has signed alliance agreements with Aman & Partners LLP in Ethiopia and Udo Udoma & Belo-Osagie in Nigeria and has a non-exclusive co-operation agreement with French international law firm Gide Loyrette Nouel.

It is a representative of Lex Mundi, a global association of independent law firms in more than 125 countries.

== History ==
Bowman Gilfillan was formed through the merger in 1998 of three law firms – Bowman Gilfillan Hayman Godfrey (established 1902), Findlay & Tait (established 1885) and John & Kernick (established 1923).

In January 2025, 57 former members of A&O Shearman, including 14 partners, joined Bowmans. This was after A&O Shearman announced that they would shut down their South African operations.

== Major deals ==
In 2009, the firm advised Bharti Airtel, India's largest cellular services provider in their proposed acquisition of the MTN Group, the largest announced but uncompleted merger in South Africa's history with a value of $23 billion.
