= Cliffe Dekker Hofmeyr =

Multinational law firm

Cliffe Dekker Hofmeyr Inc.
- No. of offices: 4
- No. of attorneys: 260 (2025)
- Major practice areas: General practice Corporate Law
- Date founded: 1853
- Website: Homepage

Cliffe Dekker Hofmeyr (CDH) is a large law firm in South Africa, headquartered in Sandton, Johannesburg, with offices in Cape Town, Stellenbosch and Nairobi. It is one of the "Big Five" law firms in South Africa. The firm traces its roots from 1853 and has since evolved through a series of mergers.

CDH was formerly allied with DLA Piper. Its affiliation with DLA Piper ended at the end of August 2015. In 2021, CDH made its first expansion outside South Africa through when it launched its Nairobi office.
