= Frans Malan =

South African judge

Judge of the Supreme Court of Appeal
- In office 1 September 2009 – 2014
- Appointed by: Jacob Zuma

Judge of the High Court
- In office 1 July 1997 – 31 August 2009
- Appointed by: Nelson Mandela
- Division: Transvaal

Personal details
- Born: Francois Retief Malan; 15 January 1944 (age 82) Bethlehem, Orange Free State; Union of South Africa
- Education: Helpmekaar Kollege
- Alma mater: University of Pretoria

Francois Retief Malan (born 15 January 1944) is a South African retired judge who served in the Supreme Court of Appeal from 2009 to 2014. Before his elevation to the appellate court, he was a judge of the Gauteng High Court from 1997 to 2009, and he also served as a judge of the Competition Appeal Court. He was formerly a legal academic at the Rand Afrikaans University, where he was an expert on banking law.

== Early life and academic career ==
Malan was born on 15 January 1944 in Bethlehem in the Orange Free State. He matriculated at Helpmekaar Boys School in Johannesburg, where he was Dux Scholar, and went on to the University of Pretoria, completing a BA in law cum laude in 1965 and an LLB cum laude in 1967. After his graduation, he completed an apprenticeship and briefly taught commercial law at the University of South Africa. Thereafter he was practised as an advocate at the Johannesburg Bar between 1968 and 1971.

In 1971, however, Malan joined the faculty of the Rand Afrikaans University; as a senior lecturer in law, his responsibilities included presenting graduate-level coursework in banking law. He was promoted to professor of law in 1973. At the same time, he studied towards his LLD at the University of Pretoria, which he completed in 1975. He remained at the Rand Afrikaans University thereafter, with stints for research abroad, and he served as the dean of the university's law faculty in 1982 and again in 1987. From 1987 to 1997, he was the director of the university's Centre for Banking Law, and he was appointed as a part-time consultant to the South African Futures Exchange in 1994.

== Judicial career ==
On 1 July 1997, Malan joined the bench as a judge of the Gauteng Division (then the Transvaal Division) of the High Court of South Africa. During his 12 years in that court, sitting in the Johannesburg High Court, he also served lengthy periods in the Competition Appeal Court between 2001 and 2009; he was an acting judge there until 2007, when President Thabo Mbeki appointed him permanently as a judge of the Competition Appeal Court.

In July 2009, he was among the candidates whom the Judicial Service Commission shortlisted and interviewed for possible elevation to the Supreme Court of Appeal. The Judicial Service Commission recommended him and Ronnie Bosielo for appointment; his candidacy was reportedly strongly supported by the president of the Supreme Court of Appeal, Lex Mpati, who admired his banking law expertise. President Jacob Zuma confirmed his appointment to the Supreme Court of Appeal with effect from 1 September 2009, and he served in the appellate court until his retirement in 2014.

== Personal life ==
He is married to Susanna Wilhelmina Cillie, a mathematician, with whom he has three children.
