= Emoluments attachment orders in South Africa =

An emoluments attachment order in South African law is a court order whereby the judgment creditor is able to attach part of the salary or wages of the judgment debtor. Once an emoluments attachment order has been granted, the employer of the judgment debtor (who is referred to as the garnishee) is obliged (on a continuing basis, and until such time as the judgment debt has been paid in full) to pay a certain portion of the judgment debtor's salary or wages to the judgment creditor.

The employer is known as the emoluments attachment debtor or garnishee. It is important to distinguish between the employer as an emoluments attachment order debtor, or garnishee, and the actual judgment debtor. Emoluments attachment orders are signed by the judgment creditor, or by a nominated attorney, as well as by the clerk, and are served by the sheriff on the emoluments attachment debtor or garnishee. An emoluments attachment order may be executed against the emoluments attachment debtor or garnishee as if it were a judgment of the court. The order is always subject to the rights of the judgment debtor, emoluments attachment debtor or any interested party to dispute the validity or correctness of the order.

The emoluments attachment order “is a good way of proceeding against a judgment debtor who does not possess sufficient attachable assets to pay off a significant portion of the debt.” Because the money goes directly from the employer to the judgment creditor, the latter's attorney does not have to worry about the judgment debtor spending it before it can be attached. The judgment debtor also has an interest in retaining his job. As long as he does so, the debt will continue to be paid.

== When to apply ==
Application for an emoluments attachment order may be made when

- the court has suspended the execution of an order or warrant for the imprisonment of a judgment debtor in terms of section 65F(2), pending the payment by the judgment debtor of the judgment debt and costs in specific instalments as determined in the suspension order; or
- the court has ordered a judgment debtor to pay the judgment debt and costs in specified instalments, as determined in the order; or
- the judgment debt remains unpaid despite the fact that the judgment debtor has served the term of his or her imprisonment or periodical imprisonment by the court due to a failure to comply with the order; or
- the judgment debtor consented thereto in writing; or
- a court has authorised it.

== Jurisdiction ==
Application for an emoluments attachment order may be made from the court of the district wherein the employer (that is, the garnishee) resides, carries on business or is employed; or alternatively, where the judgment debtor is employed by the State, the court of the district wherein the judgment debtor is so employed by the State.

== Requirements ==
In terms of section 65J(2)(a) and (b), an emoluments attachment order will not be issued

- unless the judgment debtor has consented thereto in writing, or the court has so authorised and does not suspend the authorisation;
- unless the judgment creditor or an appointed attorney has
  - sent a registered letter to the judgment debtor at his or her last known address informing the judgment debtor of the amount of the judgment debt and the costs which remain unpaid, and also warning that an emoluments attachment order will be issued if the mentioned amount is not paid within seven days after the date on which that registered letter has been posted; and
  - filed with the clerk an affidavit or affirmation wherein is indicated
    - the amount of the judgment debt on the date of the order laying down the specific instalments;
    - the costs, if any, incurred since that date; and
    - the balance owing; and
  - it is declared that the provision above, requiring the sending of the registered letter, have been complied with on the date specified therein.

Once the emoluments attachment order has been issued and served on the emoluments attachment debtor or garnishee, a certain amount will be deducted from the judgment debtor's salary by the garnishee at the end of every month, and paid over to the judgment creditor. The garnishee is entitled to deduct a five per cent commission for this service.

The court may on good cause suspend, amend or rescind the order, especially where the judgment debtor can show that, after the deduction, there are insufficient means available to support the judgment debtor and any dependants. Where the judgment debtor leaves the employment of the garnishee, the judgment debtor must advise the judgment creditor of the name and address of the new employer. The judgment creditor may then serve a certified copy of the order, together with a certificate of the balance of the debt owed, on the new employer. The new employer, as the new garnishee, is then bound by the order.

== Difference between emoluments attachment order and garnishee order ==
In terms of the procedure adopted in the Magistrates’ Courts, there is a distinction between emoluments attachment orders (which relate to the attachment of the salary or wages owing or accruing to the judgment debtor by a third party), and garnishee orders (which relate to the attachment of all the other kinds of debts which may be owed to the judgment debtor by a third party).

In essence, an emoluments attachment order is a procedure whereby a debt may be collected from a judgment debtor. The order is served on the debtor's employer (the garnishee), who is instructed to make regular weekly or monthly deductions from the debtor's salary and to pay these deductions over to the judgment creditor.

A garnishee order, on the other hand, allows a judgment creditor to attach a money debt owed to the judgment debtor by a third party. The order is served on the third party and attaches money owed by the third party (who is also known as a garnishee) to the judgment debtor. The third party or garnishee is then obliged to hand over to the judgment creditor directly as much of the attached money debt as is necessary to satisfy the judgment debt and costs.

== See also ==
- Civil procedure in South Africa
