= Suretta Snyders =

South African judge (1959–2014)

The Honourable Suretta Snyders

Judge of the Supreme Court of Appeal
- In office 1 December 2008 – 29 August 2014
- Appointed by: Kgalema Motlanthe

Judge of the High Court
- In office 1 February 1997 – 30 November 2008
- Appointed by: Nelson Mandela
- Division: Transvaal

Personal details
- Born: 18 August 1959 Prieska, Cape Province; Union of South Africa
- Died: 29 August 2014 (aged 55)
- Spouse: Robert Blake (died 2001)
- Domestic partner: Carolyn Dempster
- Education: Stellenbosch University

Suretta Snyders (18 August 1959 – 29 August 2014) was a South African judge who served in the Supreme Court of Appeal from December 2008 until her death in August 2014. Formerly an advocate and Senior Counsel in Johannesburg, she was appointed to the bench in February 1997 as a judge of the Transvaal Provincial Division of the High Court (later the Gauteng High Court).

== Early life and education ==
Snyders was born on 18 August 1959 in Prieska in the present-day Northern Cape. Her adolescent interest in law was inspired by the career of Leonora van den Heever, who was a judge in nearby Kimberley. She matriculated at Prieska High School in 1977 and attended Stellenbosch University, where she completed a BCom in law in 1980 and an LLB in 1982.

== Legal career ==
From 1982 to 1984, Snyders worked in the legal department of the Department of Transport, which had funded her education with a bursary. After completing her pupillage, she was admitted as an advocate of the Johannesburg Bar in late 1984 and she took silk in November 1996. Also in 1996, she was an acting judge in the Johannesburg High Court.

== High Court: 1997–2008 ==
On 1 February 1997, Snyders joined the bench of the High Court of South Africa as a judge of the Transvaal Provincial Division (later the Gauteng Division). She sat in the Johannesburg High Court until 2008, and she was also an acting judge in the Supreme Court of Appeal for six months in 2007 and 2008.

During that time, she heard a prominent dispute between the Mail & Guardian and MTN managing director Maanda Manyatshe, who sought to interdict the newspaper from publishing allegations that he had participated in fraud and corruption during his time at the head of the South African Post Office. Snyders dismissed Manyatshe's application.

== Supreme Court of Appeal: 2008–2014 ==
In August 2008, Snyders was one of several candidates whom the Judicial Service Commission shortlisted for possible appointment to two vacancies in the Supreme Court of Appeal. After interviews were held in Cape Town in October, she was appointed to one of the vacancies with effect from 1 December 2008.

She died in office on 29 August 2014.

== Personal life ==
She had one son with Robert Blake, to whom she was married until his death in 2001. At the time of her death, her partner was Carolyn Dempster.
