= StoneRiver =

StoneRiver, Inc. - A SAPIENS Company
- Company type: Private
- Industry: Insurance technology
- Founded: 2008
- Headquarters: Denver, Colorado, United States
- Area served: North America
- Number of employees: 600
- Parent: Sapiens International Corporation
- Website: stoneriver.com

StoneRiver, Inc., now Sapiens, is a vendor and service provider in the insurance technology marketplace, providing Life/Annuity, Property & Casualty (P&C)/Workers’ Compensation, reinsurance, financial and compliance software. The company is wholly owned by Sapiens International Corporation, (NASDAQ and TASE: SPNS), a provider of software for the insurance industry, with a growing presence in the financial services sector.

StoneRiver, now Sapiens, sells products for policy administration, claims, billing, reinsurance administration, agency management, client management, Life automated underwriting, e-applications, and illustrations. The company's financial and compliance offerings encompass software for annual statement preparation, general ledger, financial reporting and payments. Headquartered in Denver, CO, Sapiens has locations throughout U.S. including California, Colorado, Florida, and Ohio.

== History ==
In 2017, Sapiens International Corporation acquired StoneRiver from Stone Point Capital and Fiserv. Prior to July 2008, the business units that comprise StoneRiver were part of Fiserv Incorporated, which was founded in 1984.

== Corporate structure ==
=== StoneRiver, Inc ===
StoneRiver, Inc provides software products and services in the following areas:

1. P&C Policy administration
2. P&C Claim management
3. P&C Reinsurance Administration
4. Life insurance, Life annuity, and Long-term care policy administration
5. Life, Annuity and Long-Term Care sales illustrations
6. Life, Annuity and Long-Term care automated underwriting
7. Financial & Compliance: annual statement preparation, general ledger, financial reporting and payments
