= Robert McBride (police officer) =

South African Umkhonto we Sizwe member and police chief

Robert McBride MMS, CLS
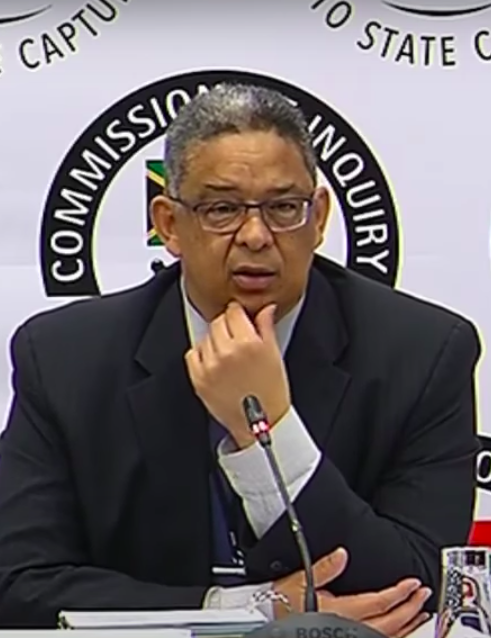
- McBride in 2019

Personal details
- Born: 6 July 1963 (age 63) Durban, South Africa
- Awards: Merit Medal MMS Conspicuous Leadership Star CLS

Robert McBride MMS CLS (born 6 July 1963) is the former chief of the metropolitan police for Ekurhuleni Metropolitan Municipality. During the apartheid era he was a member of Umkhonto we Sizwe, the paramilitary wing of the African National Congress. For his actions against the apartheid regime, he was convicted of terrorism after he carried out a bombing operation against Magoos Bar, a busy Durban night club frequented by apartheid security forces, in an attack that killed three people. This conviction was "for all purposes...deemed not to have taken place" under the Promotion of National Unity and Reconciliation Act, which recognized that resistance against apartheid was legitimate.

In February 2014 McBride was appointed as executive director of the Independent Police Investigative Directorate. In March 2015 he was suspended from this position by the Minister of Police. The decision was set aside by the Constitutional Court of South Africa in September 2016 in McBride v Minister of Police. He has been appointed as head of the Foreign Branch of the State Security Agency from 1 July 2020.

== Biography ==
=== During apartheid ===
McBride was born in Addington Hospital to Derrick McBride and grew up in Wentworth, a racially segregated suburb about 11 km from Durban, where his parents were schoolteachers. He attended Fairvale High School in Wentworth and participated in extramural activities like rugby, karate, boxing, chess, hockey and soccer. After he was beaten by an older boy in the neighbourhood, his father taught him martial arts.

He developed political views at an early age due to influence of his father. He was particularly influenced by two books: A.J. Venter's Coloured: A Profile of 2 Million South Africans, which describes the efforts of coloured political activists such as James April, Don Mattera, Jakes Gerwel, Basil February, and his uncle, Rev. Clive McBride; and Soledad Brothers: The Prison Letters of George Jackson, written by a founding member of the American Black Guerrilla Family.

McBride was best known for his leadership of the cell that bombed the "Why Not" Restaurant and Magoo's Bar in Durban on 14 June 1986, an attack in which three white women were killed and 69 people injured. He was captured and convicted for the Durban bombing, and sentenced to death, but later reprieved while on death row. In 1992, he was released after his actions were classified as politically motivated. He was later granted amnesty at the Truth and Reconciliation Commission (TRC), which provided for amnesty in return for complete disclosure of acts of politically motivated violence after the ANC changed its early denials of involvement to a claim that they ordered the bombing. The South African government, at the time of the bombing, had portrayed the attack as being targeted at innocent civilians.

The Truth and Reconciliation Commission (South Africa) report stated, "It seems that not many, if any, of the victims in this incident were members of the South African Police. Furthermore, the criticisms directed at the quality of reconnaissance of the "Why Not Bar" might very well be valid. It may be, as was argued, that he ought to have ensured at the relevant time that the primary targets of the attack were present and therefore the concept of the proportionality of the attack and its results must be considered." McBride and others were granted amnesty for the attack, although the commission did find the bombing to be a "gross violation of human rights", as well for other convictions under the apartheid regime including those arising from the escape of Gordon Webster, in which ANC freedom fighters broke the wounded fighter out from police guard, only killing four apartheid police officers. In 2006, McBride received the Merit Medal in Silver and the Conspicuous Leadership Star from the South African National Defence Force (Note: The medal was awarded under the auspices of the SANDF, but was in fact a retrospective award by MK for his service in and to MK) for his service and combat leadership in Umkhonto We Sizwe.

- Merit Medal (Silver) (MMS) (South Africa)
- Conspicuous Leadership Star (CLS) (South Africa)

After release from prison in September 1992, McBride was assigned by the ANC's Peace Desk as its representative on the Witswaterand during the ongoing violence between supporters of the ANC and those of the Zulu-based Inkatha Freedom Party. However his main role was to coordinate ANC-aligned Self Defence Units or SDUs, particularly in the townships of Thokoza and Katlehong, where McBride later remarked that 'instead of being the Peace Desk, as it were, I became the defence desk or as they often joked, the war desk'. His activities, along with Duma Nkosi included organising a command structure for the SDUs and providing weapons and training for them, often from former guerrilla fighters from MK. When asked what kind of training was provided, he replied, 'military training, training to kill the enemy'. However he was sometimes frustrated that the ANC limited the quantity and quality of weapons into the townships and noted that he often had to buy them from contacts in Mozambique. McBride reported that he used the vehicles assigned to the Peace Desk to smuggle weapons into the townships. The fractured nature of the SDUs also meant that some of McBride's work was involved with negotiating and attempting to impose discipline on SDU fighters, some of whom were involved in crime and internecine disputes. McBride claimed to have got the upper hand over the Inkatha supporters, who largely lived in migrant worker hostels, by 1994. He asserted 'we put the hostels under siege... they couldn't go in, they couldn't go out. We shot their water tanks out, we sabotaged their sewage system'.

In October 1999, McBride testified about his activities during the township war with Inkatha to the Truth and Reconciliation Commission in Durban, in return for which he received an amnesty. He stated 'When I was released from prison in September 1992, I was instructed to work on the ANC's Peace Desk for the Gauteng Province. I dealt with violence and violence monitoring and the training of paralegals who would monitor violence and take note. It was at the stage where the apartheid State had used its surrogates to massacre township residents. At that stage, I had witnessed the terror being visited upon the communities by people from the hostels, who identified themselves as Inkatha. Inkatha members had also said they want to take over the East Rand, the area I was active in and make it their base. The result was that people were killed every day. I could not stand by and allow this to happen.'

=== After apartheid ===
On 9 March 1998, McBride, then a high-ranking official in the South African Department of Foreign Affairs, was arrested by the Mozambican police in Ressano Garcia on charges of arms trafficking from Mozambique to South Africa, despite an attempt to run for the border. He was about to receive 50 AK-47 rifles and 100 Makarov pistols. He maintained he was investigating arms trafficking while working for the South African National Intelligence Agency (NIA). After a period in detention, all charges were dropped. Inkatha Freedom Party (IFP) head Mangosuthu Buthelezi has alleged, however, that the weapons were meant for ANC death squads to use against IFP leaders.

In 1999, McBride faced an assault charge after he, underworld figure Cyril Beeka, and another man with whom they were visiting an escort agency, allegedly assaulted an agency employee.

McBride was held up by IRA/Sinn Féin leader Martin McGuinness as an example of a former combatant who moved up into a leadership role following the political changes in South Africa.

In 2003, McBride was appointed Chief of the Metropolitan Police of Ekurhuleni Municipality (formerly East Rand).

On 21 December 2006, after a Christmas party McBride was involved in a single car collision near Centurion. According to witnesses, McBride was under the influence of alcohol. Officers of the Ekurhuleni Metropolitan Police Department arrived quickly even though the scene was more than 40 km out of their jurisdiction. According to witnesses the Ekurhuleni metro police assaulted witnesses and threatened to shoot anyone who telephoned the South African Police Service (SAPS). McBride was quickly removed from the scene by the Ekurhuleni metro police. It was unclear whether in accordance with standard police procedure blood samples were taken by the Ekurhuleni metro police, or by a medical facility, to determine his blood-alcohol level.

Three of the Ekurhuleni metro police involved in removing McBride from the accident scene, Patrick Johnston, Stanley Segathevan and Ithumeleng Koko initially supported McBride, but subsequently gave "damning statements" to the South African Police. Thereafter, it was reported that on 4 July 2007 McBride and a number of cars of Ekurhuleni metro police detained and intimidated Patrick Johnston at a petrol station, on the pretext that he was driving a car with tinted windows which is against South African traffic law. Segathevan joined Johnston, and members of the Boksburg SAPS Task Force arrived at the scene. McBride is alleged to have abused the SAPS members.

Johnston and Segathevan were arrested by the Ekurhuleni metro police, but Henk Strydom, Boksburg's senior public prosecutor, declined to prosecute due to "insufficient evidence and a case totally without merit", and Johnston and Segathevan obtained a court interdict to protect them from McBride and the Ekurhuleni Metro Police Department, as they claimed McBride had made death threats against them, which McBride denied. McBride was charged with drunken driving, fraud and defeating the ends of justice following the car accident. In his defence he produced a medical certificate stating that he was suffering from hypoglycaemia (low blood sugar). The doctor who gave him the certificate is facing charges of fraud and defeating the ends of justice with regard to the certificate.

In 2011 the Constitutional Court found in The Citizen 1978 Pty (Ltd) and others v Mcbride 2011 (4) SA 191 (CC) that McBride, due to his role in the night club bombing, may legally be called a murderer.

In July 2021, McBride was suspended from his position as head of the foreign branch of the State Security Agency. The SAA would not reveal if his dismissal was related to a failed SSA operation earlier in 2021, where four South African spies were caught and left stranded in Maputo, Mozambique. The spies were returned to South Africa after the intervention of state security minister Ayanda Dlodlo.

== Biographies ==
Two authors have written biographies on the life of Robert McBride:

- Rostron, Bryan (1991). Till Babylon Falls. Coronet. ISBN 978-0-340-54061-9.
- Mokae, Gomolemo (2004). Robert McBride: a coloured life. South African History Online in association with Vista University. ISBN 978-0-620-32181-5.
