= Werksmans =

South African law firm

Werksmans Attorneys
- Headquarters: Johannesburg, South Africa
- No. of offices: 3
- No. of lawyers: Over 200
- No. of employees: 410
- Major practice areas: Corporate law Commercial law
- Key people: David Hertz (Chairman); Jeremy Botha (CEO)
- Date founded: 1917
- Founder: Nathan Werksman
- Company type: Legal Practice
- Website: werksmans.com

Werksmans Attorneys is a South African law firm with offices in Johannesburg, Cape Town and Stellenbosch. It was established in 1917. In 1993, Werksmans was one of the founding members of LEX Africa, currently the oldest and largest African network.

The firm has recently been considered as the latest a member of the "Big Five law firms" of leading South African law firms.

== History ==
Werksmans was founded in Johannesburg in 1917 by Nathan Werksman, a Jewish South African lawyer.Werksman opened his practice, initially known as N. Werksman, on 21 April 1917, his 21st birthday, at Melahske's Building on the corner of Market and Harrison Streets in Johannesburg. The practice expanded through partnerships and mergers. By the end of the 1940s it was known as N Werksman and Partners, and in the 1960s and early 1970s its name became N Werksman, Hyman, Barnett and Partners. In 1976, the firm adopted the name Werksmans Attorneys, becoming one of the first South African law firms to abandon the practice of incorporating partners' names into its name. Nathan Werksman remained associated with the firm until his death on 15 December 1987, aged 91.

== Pro bono and public-interest work ==
Werksmans provides pro bono legal services to people who cannot afford legal representation and to non-profit, public-benefit and civil-society organisations. Its pro bono activities include staffing legal clinics, providing legal advice and representation, assisting organisations with advocacy initiatives, and undertaking strategic and public-interest litigation.

In 2012, Werksmans established a law clinic in Diepsloot, Johannesburg. The clinic provides pro bono legal assistance to people in the area, including advice and representation concerning consumer law, child maintenance, property disputes and labour-related matters. Trialogue reported that the clinic was established with community partner Afrika Tikkun, which had identified the need for access to pro bono legal services in the area.

The firm has also undertaken pro bono representation in individual cases reported by South African media. In 2013, Werksmans represented Comrades Marathon winner Ludwick Mamabolo on a pro bono basis in proceedings arising from a doping allegation; Mamabolo was subsequently cleared. In 2017, Werksmans senior associate Jyoti Narshi represented District Six resident Yusuf Williams pro bono in proceedings concerning his threatened eviction.

== Practice areas ==
With a focus on corporate and commercial law, the firm's practice areas include banking and finance; business recovery, insolvency, and restructuring; competition law; labour law; environmental law; health, pharmaceutical, and life sciences; and mining, energy, and natural resources. It also provides legal advisory services for intellectual property, litigation and dispute resolution (and alternative dispute resolution in the form of mediation and arbitration), media and communications, mergers and acquisitions, property transactions, sports and entertainment, tax, and information technology.

== In the news ==
In November 2019, the firm was representing celebrity Boity Thulo in her legal attempt to terminate her contract with her management agency.

After an apparent issue with non-payment of fees, Werksmans severed ties with its client the Passenger Rail Agency of South Africa in February 2020.
