= ENSafrica =

Law firm in Africa

Edward Nathan Sonnenbergs Inc.
- Headquarters: Sandton, South Africa
- No. of offices: 15 (including two pro bono offices)
- No. of attorneys: 600+ (2025)
- No. of employees: 1,020+ (2014)
- Major practice areas: Law, Tax, Forensics and IP
- Key people: Michael Katz (Chairman); Mzi Mgudlwa (CEO)
- Date founded: 1905; 121 years ago
- Company type: Private
- Website: ensafrica.com

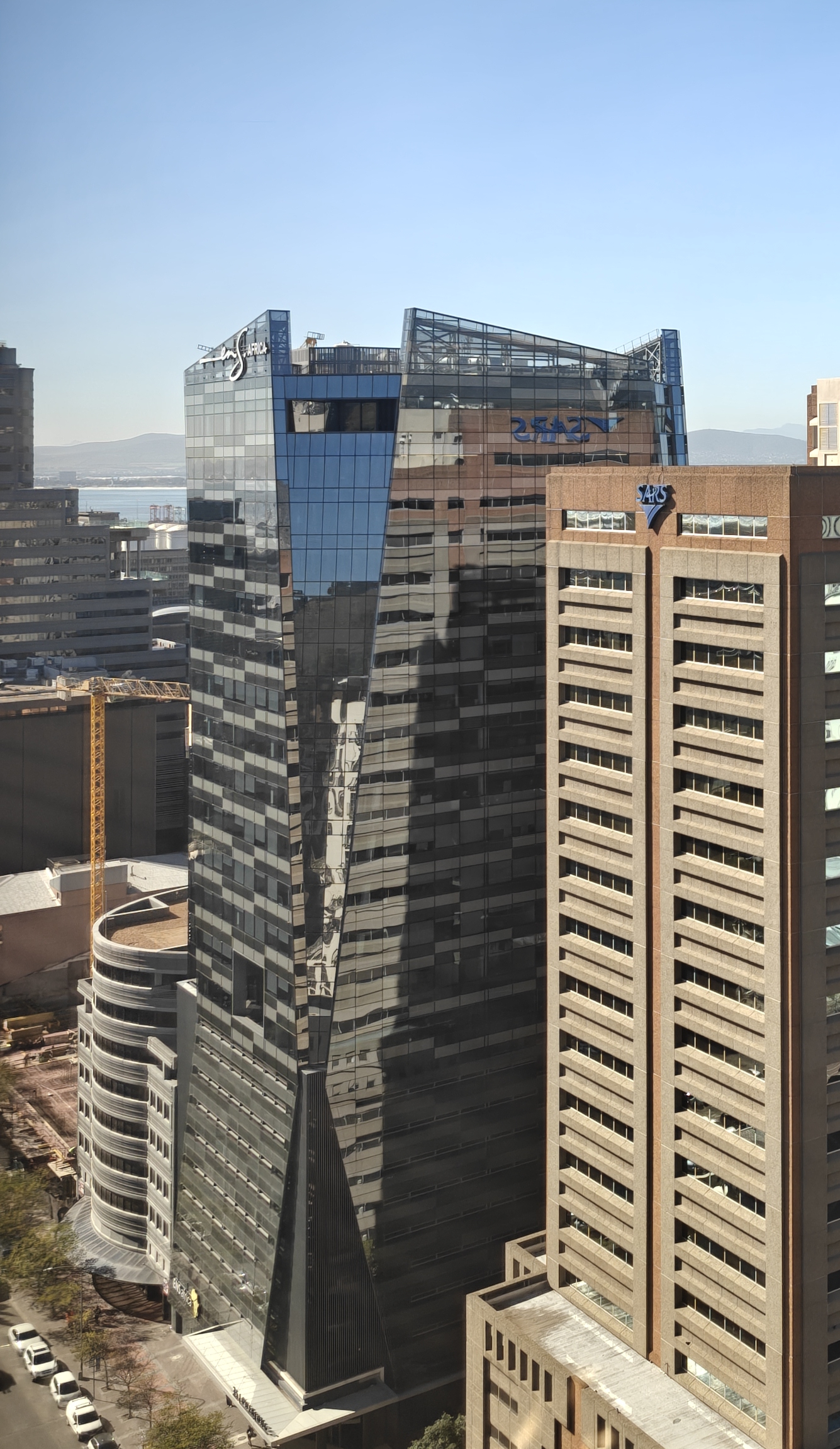
ENS's building in Cape Town's CBD

ENS (officially Edward Nathan Sonnenbergs Inc.) is Africa's largest law firm. Headquartered in Sandton, South Africa, ENS has over 600 practitioners. The firm specialises in all commercial areas of law, tax, forensics, and intellectual property.

The firm is a Level 1 Broad-Based Black Economic Empowerment (BBBEE) contributor. ENS is one of the traditional "Big Five" law firms in South Africa.

== History ==
=== Edward Nathan and Friedland ===
Edward Nathan & Friedland was formed in 1905. In 1999, Edward Nathan & Friedland was bought by Nedbank for R40 million. After an exodus of clients and lawyers, as well as deeming the investment non-core, in 2004, Nedbank sold Edward Nathan & Friedland back to 47 directors for R50 million.

In addition to the purchase price, R33 million in available cash in Edward Nathan & Friedland was transferred to Nedbank. In total, Nedbank suffered a loss of R20 million on the sale.

=== Sonnenberg Hoffmann and Galombik ===
Sonnenberg Hoffmann & Galombik was formed in 1936.

=== Edward Nathan Sonnenbergs ===
The firm was formed after a 2006 merger between Cape Town-based law firm Sonnenberg Hoffmann Galombik (SHG) and the Johannesburg-based law firm Edward Nathan & Friedland.

== Divisions ==
Its specialist divisions include Africa regulatory and business intelligence, Asia-Africa trade (including China, India, and Japan), and structuring of investments through Mauritius.

== Offices ==
In August 2012, ENS became the first African headquartered law firm with integrated offices across different African jurisdictions, with the opening of offices in Rwanda and Burundi, which office was closed in 2015.

This was shortly followed by another office opening in the Ugandan capital of Kampala in December 2012. In December 2013, ENS announced a merger with Mauritius' largest and oldest firm, De Comarmond & Koenig.

On 1 November 2014, the firm announced the opening of two offices in the Namibian capital Windhoek and Swakopmund respectively, with a third Namibian office, in Walvis Bay, opening soon thereafter. This was done through a merger with local Namibian law firm Lorentz Angula.

Former CEO, Piet Faber, is quoted (31 March 2014) as saying that ENS will open offices in at least six other African jurisdictions over the next two years.

On 1 May 2015, the firm announced the opening of its 13th office on the African continent, following a merger with local Tanzanian law firm, Rex Attorneys.

In 2015, ENS closed its Burundi office.

The most recent office to be opened was formed through a merger with local Ghanaian firm Oxford & Beaumont Solicitors, and formally opened as ENS Ghana on 1 December 2015. Oxford & Beaumont Solicitors was the first Ghanaian firm to open representative offices in London.

The company has offices in several countries and cities:

- Ghana: Accra
- Kenya: Nairobi
- Mauritius: Port Louis
- Namibia: Windhoek, Swakopmund, Walvis Bay
- Rwanda: Kigali
- South Africa: Alexandra (Pro Bono Office), Cape Town, Durban, Johannesburg, Mitchells Plain (Pro Bono Office), Stellenbosch
- Uganda: Kampala

== Controversies ==
=== Julius Malema ===
In 2010 and 2011, ENS acted for Julius Malema in a court case brought against him by Afriforum in relation to his singing of the song "shoot the boer" (shoot the farmer / white person). The firm subsequently withdrew from the case, resulting in Malema accusing the firm of racism. Ultimately, on 12 September 2011, Malema was convicted of hate speech.

=== Tax Evasion ===
In a court action brought in the Western Cape High Court in 2018, the South African Revenue Service claimed that ENS created a R3.5 billion tax evasion scheme involving Christo Wiese and Tullow Oil. In addition to pursuing Christo Wiese and Tullow Oil, the South African Revenue Service is also pursuing a former ENS executive.
