= Zinniaville =

Place in North West, South Africa

Zinniaville ZZ
- Location within North West (South African province) Location within South Africa
- Coordinates: 25.648°S 27.241°E
- Country: South Africa
- Province: North West
- District: Bojanala Platinum
- Municipality: Rustenburg Local Municipality
- Main Place: Zinniaville Jaame masjid

Government
  - Type: Category B municipality with an Executive Mayor and Ward Committees
  - Councillor: (ANC)

Area
  - Total: 1.50 km^{2} (0.58 sq mi)

Population (2011)
  - Total: 3,225
  - Density: 2,150/km^{2} (5,570/sq mi)

Racial makeup (2011)
  - Black African: 25.5%
  - Coloured: 2.4%
  - Indian/Asian: 80.0%
  - White: 1.1%
  - Other: 20.1%

First languages (2011)
  - English: 75.9%
  - Afrikaans: 6.5%
  - Tswana: 3.8%
  - Southern Ndebele: 1.0%
  - Other: 12.8%
- Time zone: UTC+2 (SAST)
- Postal code (street): 0302
- PO box: 0302
- Area code: 0302
- Website: www.zinniaville.co.za

Zinniaville is a small suburb in the city of Rustenburg, in the North West Province of South Africa.

Zinniaville is close to the world's two biggest platinum mines. It lies close to the old border of Bophuthatswana. It has a majority Muslim-Indian population. Zinniaville has the biggest mosque in Rustenburg called Zinniaville Jaame masjid, where at least 1 000 people come to pray on Fridays. It also has a Hindu temple.

Zinniaville has a soccer pitch with flood lights and two schools, Nur Ul Imaan Muslim School and Zinnaville Secondary School. Zinniaville Secondary School was initially an all Indian school in the apartheid era and was a popular school amongst people from Botswana.

== Trade ==
Zinniaville shopping complex is one of the busiest in the area. Ranging from wholesale to retail. Zinniaville shopping complex has many supermarkets and cold drink suppliers which attract consumers from surrounding under developed areas.

Zinniaville industrial area consists of factories of Chicken farms, plastic factories and wood suppliers and much more.
