= Deneys Reitz Inc =

Defunct South African law firm

- Headquarters: Johannesburg, South Africa
- No. of offices: 3
- No. of attorneys: 230+ (2011)
- No. of employees: 500+ (2009)
- Major practice areas: General practice
- Key people: Michael Hart, Chairman
- Date founded: 1922
- Founder: Deneys Reitz
- Company type: Personal liability company
- Dissolved: 1 June 2011
- Website: www.deneysreitz.co.za

Deneys Reitz was a large South African law firm based in Sandton, Johannesburg with offices in Cape Town and Durban. It was one of the "Big Five" law firms in South Africa.

On 1 June 2011 Deneys Reitz Inc joined the Norton Rose Group, simultaneously rebranding as Norton Rose South Africa. At the time of the merger the enlarged Norton Rose Group had 2600 lawyers in 39 offices and was a top 10 global legal practice by number of lawyers.
