= Legalease Ltd. =

British legal research firm

Legalease Ltd. is a global legal research and publishing company founded in the UK in 1987. The company assesses global law firms and lawyers for its publications, annual lists and guides, including Legal Business, GC Magazine and The Legal 500 series.

== Overview ==
Legalease Ltd. is a legal data, research, rankings and analytics company based in the United Kingdom.

The company was founded by its first editor-in-chief, John M. Pritchard. Since 2015, the managing director is David Goulthorpe, with David Burgess as publishing director. The company is a London living wage employer.

Publications include Legal Business Magazine. Its GC Powerlist, (formerly the "Corporate Counsel 100"), publishes annually, which includes its 100 top-rated in-house lawyers in various regions of the world. Legal Business magazine temporarily ceased publishing and shuttered operations in April 2020 due to COVID-19 but resumed normal service in October 2020.

== The Legal 500 ==
The Legal 500 series is the largest legal referral guide in the world, with 5.6 million users globally, in 2016, compared with Chambers & Partners' 3.5 million. Publications include editorials, various "yearbook" industry reports, fivehundred and GC Magazine for general counsel practitioners, offering resources for in-house lawyers, such as client insight reports.it also hosts live events and roundtables; and aggregates legal news.

Rankings in The Legal 500 are reported as merit-based, relying on both publicly available information and law firm self-reported information, and are published on the company's website. The company also issues several annual awards, such as The Legal 500 Awards, and recognizes lawyers with various accolades, including its "GC Powerlist" designations.

Amidst the #MeToo movement's unveiling of "sexual harassment scandals within several of the world’s leading law firms", "The ugly side of law firm research", published in the December 2018 – January 2019 issue of fivehundred, stated that "The Legal 500 were shocked to discover... inappropriate or unprofessional conduct initiated by lawyers during the research process for our various guides" in which "certain partners... are displaying the same bullying and harassing behaviour".

== See also ==
- Chambers and Partners
