= Independent Police Investigative Directorate =

South African policing oversight body

Department overview
- Formed: 1997; 28 years ago
- Jurisdiction: Government of South Africa
- Headquarters: Benstra Building, 473B Stanza Bopape Street, Arcadia, Pretoria
- Annual budget: R 353 778 million (2021/22)
- Ministers responsible: Senzo Mchunu, Minister of Police; Cassel Charlie Mathale
- Department executive: Jennifer Ntlatseng, Executive Director
- Parent department: Department of Police
- Key document: Independent Police Investigative Directorate Act, 2011
- Website: https://www.ipid.gov.za/

The Independent Police Investigative Directorate (IPID), formerly the Independent Complaints Directorate (ICD), is a department of the South African government responsible for investigating complaints against the South African Police Service and municipal police services.

The IPID was created in April 1997 as part of the post-apartheid reform of the South African Police. It investigates deaths in custody, crimes allegedly committed by police officers, violations of SAPS policy, and dissatisfaction with the service provided by the police.

== See also ==
- McBride v Minister of Police – Constitutional Court decision on IPID's independence
