= Chambers and Partners =

UK-based legal research firm

- Industry: Rankings
- Founded: 1989; 37 years ago
- Parent: Orbach and Chambers Publishing Limited

Chambers and Partners (often noted elsewhere as Chambers & Partners) is a research firm headquartered in London, United Kingdom, that produces international rankings for the legal industry.

== Orbach and Chambers ==
Orbach and Chambers Publishing Limited was founded 19 December 1969, in London, by friends Laurence Francis Orbach, a university professor, and lawyer Michael Ernest David Chambers.

Chambers, whose father was a filmmaker, retired and sold the business in 2018, going on to establish The Garden Cinema, an independent cinema created in Art Deco style by the architects in the old office building in Parker Street, Covent Garden.

== Chambers and Partners ==
Chambers and Partners was founded in 1989 as a division of Orbach & Chambers Publishing Limited (later, Orbach & Chambers Holdings Limited), book publishers. by Laurence Francis Orbach, who, in 1976, also co-founded The Quarto Group. and attorney Michael Ernest David Chambers.

During the 21st century, the firm became widely recognized as an authority on global legal rankings, and was referenced, in 2018, by The National Law Review as "one of the legal industry’s most prestigious rankings — and also the most notoriously difficult to crack."

In March 2018, Michael Chambers sold the company to investment fund, Inflexion Private Equity, with former managing director Mark Wyatt re-joining Chambers and Partners as CEO. The sale was represented by Slaughter and May.

In 2020, the company was criticized, alongside its competitor The Legal 500, for taking advantage of the U.K. government furlough scheme to help alleviate economic hardship resulting from the COVID-19 pandemic in the United Kingdom, despite strong sales, while claiming a reduction in income which did not appear supported in practice.

== Operations ==
The company employs over 200 editors in London who conduct research and interviews in more than 20 languages, and provides ranking on over 80,000 lawyers in more than 185 jurisdictions.

The Times of London reported the company's revenues as £20 million for 2018.

In June 2019, The Wall Street Journal reported that Chambers and Partners most recent annual guide to lawyers based solely in the U.S. totaled 3,239 pages.

=== Chambers Guides ===
Aside from its ranking activities; since 1990, the company has published "Chambers Global Practice Guides", for law practice areas in a range of global jurisdictions. Chambers Guides, and its sections, are authored and edited by vetted legal professionals from firms such as DLA Piper, Eversheds Sutherland, Baker McKenzie, Cravath, Swaine and Moore, and Morgan, Lewis & Bockius.

Chambers and Partners publishes its law school guide, "Chambers Student" online.

== Rankings ==
Firms with the most rankings in 2025:

Firms with the Most Rankings
Firm	Total "Band 1" Lawyers	Total "Band 1" Departments	Total "Band 1" Rankings (Departments and Lawyers)	Total Ranked Lawyers	Total Ranked Departments
A&O Shearman	68	113	181	326	293
Clifford Chance	61	123	184	341	286
Latham & Watkins	56	72	128	268	209
White & Case	60	63	123	275	254
Freshfields	49	55	104	223	170
Baker McKenzie	40	55	95	359	307
Kirkland & Ellis	29	24	53	142	82
DLA Piper	36	23	59	245	113
Dentons	18	21	39	161	134
Skadden	20	18	38	104	102
Sidley Austin	20	18	38	110	107
Simpson Thacher	16	17	33	81	68
Gibson Dunn	64	36	100	212	105

== See also ==
- The Legal 500
