= University of Cape Town Faculty of Law =

Law school of the University of Cape Town

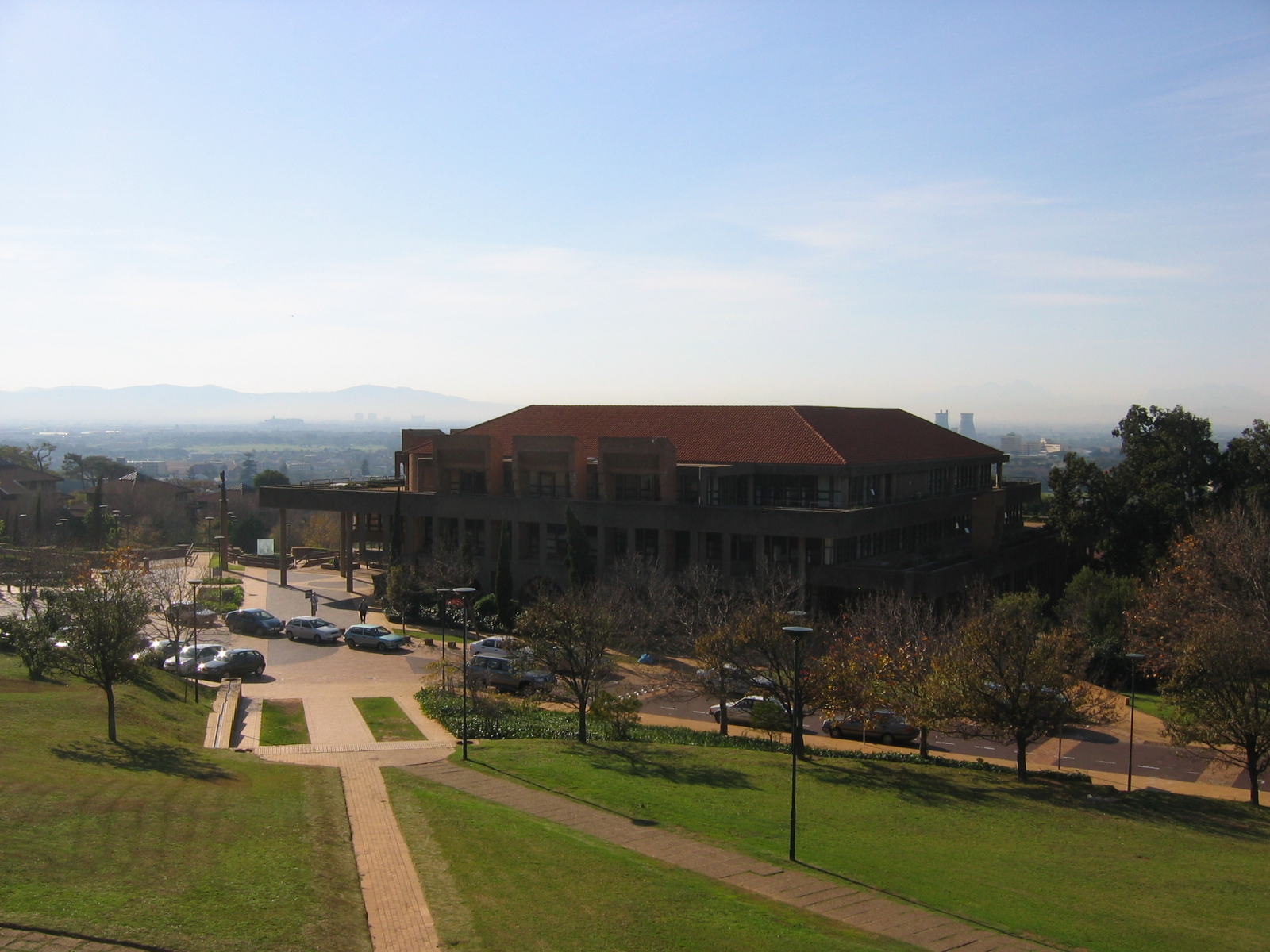
- The Wilfred and Jules Kramer Law Building
- Parent school: University of Cape Town
- Established: 1859; 167 years ago
- Dean: Danwood Chirwa (since 2019)
- Location: Cape Town, South Africa
- Website: law.uct.ac.za

The University of Cape Town Faculty of Law is the oldest law school in South Africa. It was established in 1859 as a division of the South African College in the former Cape Colony. It currently enrols about 1,200 students in undergraduate and postgraduate programmes, the largest being the LLB. It is housed in the Wilfred and Jules Kramer Law Building on the university's Middle Campus in Rondebosch, Cape Town.

The faculty comprises three academic departments – one each for public law, commercial law, and private law – and a number of research units. It also houses the postgraduate School for Advanced Legal Studies and the journal Acta Juridica. The faculty's staff and students were predominantly white under the apartheid-era Extension of University Education Act, but the faculty has participated in UCT's affirmative action measures since the end of apartheid.

The faculty's alumni include a former Chief Justice of South Africa (Newton Ogilvie Thompson), four justices of the Constitutional Court of South Africa (John Didcott, Albie Sachs, Kate O'Regan, and Owen Rogers), and a justice of the Supreme Court of Zimbabwe (Bennie Goldin). Alumni have been particularly well-represented in the Cape Division of the High Court of South Africa and former Supreme Court of South Africa; several former Judges President of the division – including Theo van Wyk, George Munnik, Gerald Friedman, and Edwin King – studied law in the faculty. Alumni have also served as Judge President of the Land Claims Court (Fikile Bam), the Competition Appeal Court (Dennis Davis), and the Free State High Court (Cagney Musi). Other alumni are prominent figures in politics, academia, and legal practice.

== History ==
=== South African College ===
In 1858 the Cape Colony instituted the legal board exam, inaugurating a new regulatory regime for South African legal practitioners. The following year, at the request of the colonial government, the South African College (SAC) in Cape Town became the first South African institution to introduce formal law teaching through the establishment of a professorial chair in law. During its first 60 years, the law program did not issue its own legal qualifications, but instead served to prepare students for the external examinations set by the Board of Public Examiners and later (from 1863) by the University of the Cape of Good Hope.

During a meeting on 23 February 1859, the SAC Council elected unanimously to appoint Jan Brand as the first professor of law. The first law lecture was delivered on 16 April 1859. Brand's tenure ended in 1863, when he became the president of the Orange Free State; his two successors, Professors F. S. Watermeyer and A. W. Cole, served very brief stints before their death and resignation, respectively. Thereafter, between 1865 and 1890, the law chair at SAC was vacant due to cost-saving measures by the colonial government. During that hiatus, the law program's foremost advocate was Casper Hendrik van Zyl, who provided informal law teaching to SAC students and continued to lobby for the formal establishment of a School of Law. In 1890 his campaign succeeded and he was appointed to the revived SAC chair in law.

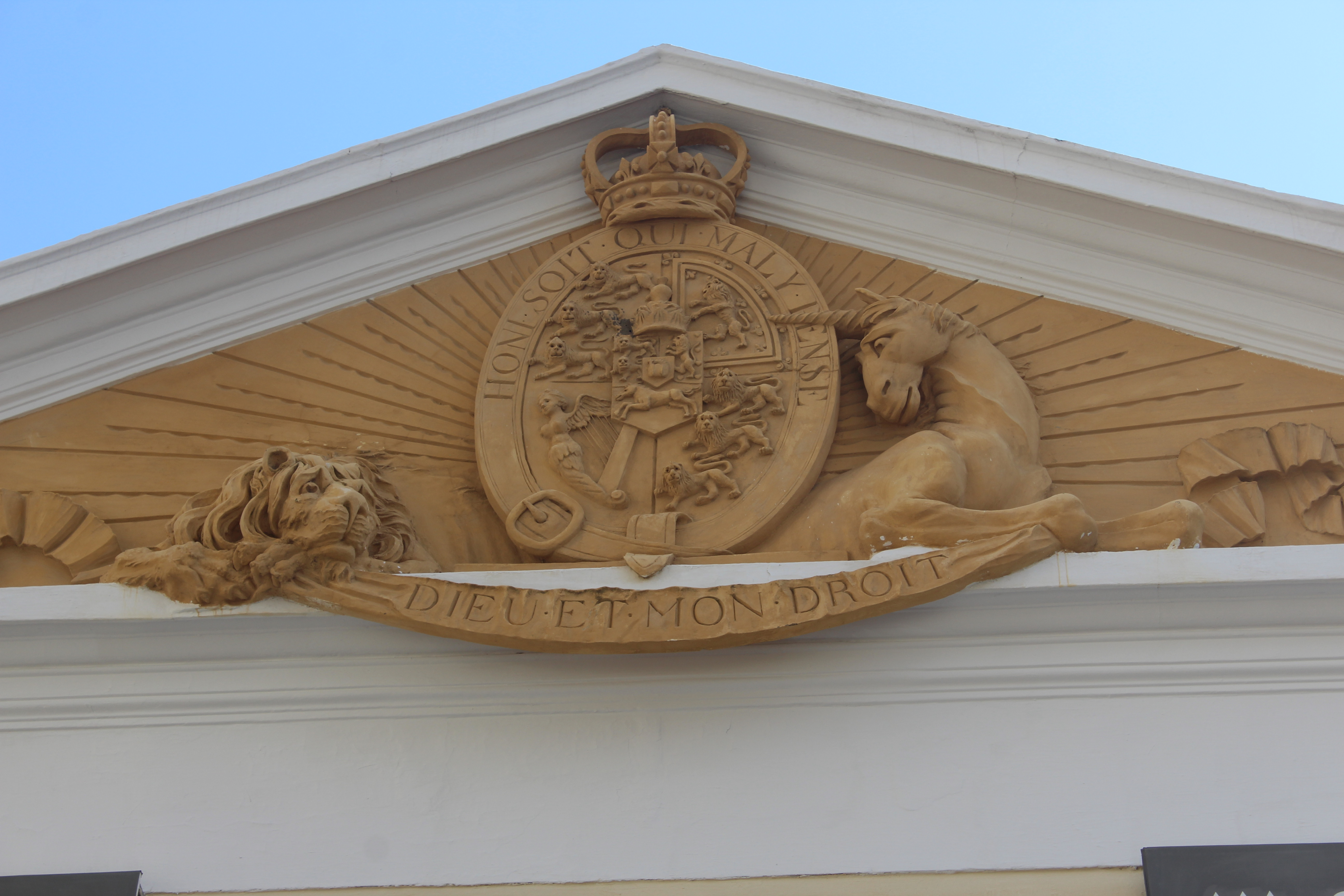
The old Supreme Court building (later the Slave Lodge) in Cape Town, where early law lectures were held

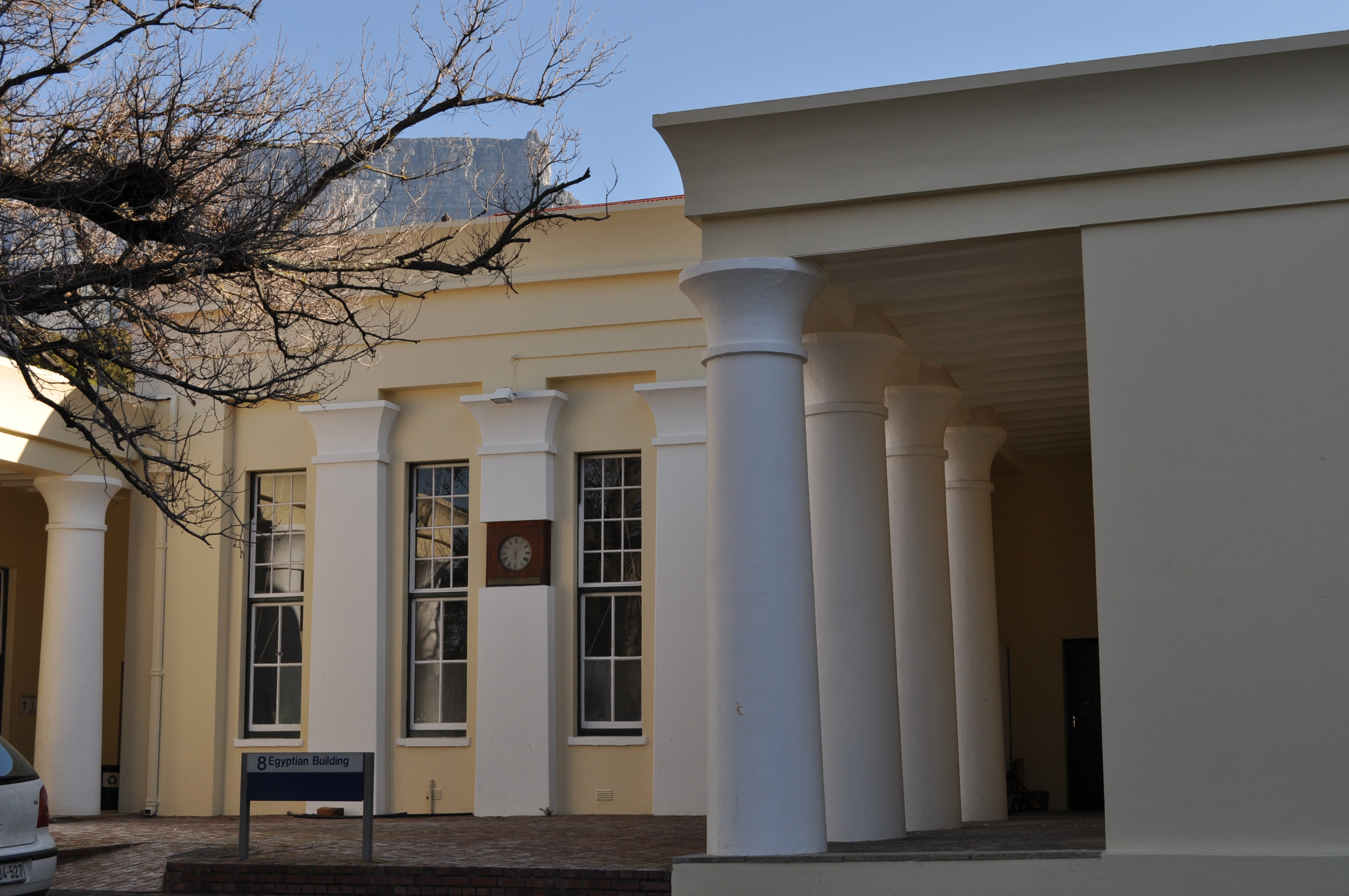
The Egyptian Building on Government Avenue in Cape Town, where law lectures were held for a period in the early 20th century

Van Zyl retired in 1896 and was followed in his chair by Professor Alexander John McGregor in 1896; Professors L. E. Benjamin and William Porter Buchanan (jointly) in 1898; and (again jointly) Professors Clemens Gutsche and R. R. R. B. Howes in 1912. In the early 20th century, the law school became increasingly institutionalised, and the Law Students' Council was established in 1916. However, throughout this period, there remained only a single chair in law, held by one or two men at a time; other teaching was provided by adjunct lecturers, who included Fritz Gardiner, Reginald Davis, George Sutton, Jackie de Villiers, Fraser Russell, and Albert van der Sandt Centlivres (all future judges). From 1896 onwards, lectures were delivered on the SAC campus; before then, they had been held in various locations, notably the Master's Meeting Room at the Cape Supreme Court on Adderley Street, until classes moved onto the SAC campus in 1896. The curriculum combined English law with Roman and Roman-Dutch law.

=== Expansion ===
In April 1918, SAC was re-launched as the University of Cape Town (UCT); it conferred its first LLB degree in December 1919 to Frans Herman van der Willigen. Student numbers continued to grow over the next two decades, reaching 74 students by 1939. The university pursued an open model of admissions, based primarily on academic criteria, abstaining from the colour bar approach favoured by Afrikaans-medium universities; early black students at the law faculty included Fikile Bam, Dullah Omar, and Cissie Gool. Nonetheless, the faculty's black student population was extremely small, and it was further restricted with the formal inauguration of apartheid in 1948 and especially the Extension of University Education Act in 1959.

The academic staff grew alongside the student population. In 1919, after a sustained campaign, the law program obtained approval to establish a new full-time chair in Roman-Dutch law. Its first holders were G. W. Wille, Tom William Price, and Wouter de Vos, in that order. In 1923 and 1925, two further chairs were established, one of which was the W. P. Schreiner Chair of Roman Law and Jurisprudence, a post in Roman law endowed in honour of Prime Minister W. P. Schreiner. The Schreiner Chair was held by Professor J. Kerr Wylie until 1948, by Professor Ben-Zion Beinart until 1974, by Professor Johannes Christiaan de Wet until 1981, and finally by Professor Reinhard Zimmermann until 1988. In later years it was joined by chairs in South African private law (1962), public law (1967), and commercial law (1973), established under Professors Wouter de Vos, Donald Molteno, and J. T. R. Gibson respectively. The first women to be appointed permanently to the faculty were Ina Ackermann and Nicola Peart.

Having occupied premises in the Egyptian Building on Hiddingh Campus and later in the P. D. Hahn Building on Upper Campus, the law faculty moved to its own building at the end of 1987. The Wilfred and Jules Kramer Law Building, named after two major benefactors of the faculty, is located on UCT's Middle Campus in Rondebosch, Cape Town. Since 2000, the bottom two floors of the Kramer Building house the Brand van Zyl Law Library, which became a separate branch of the UCT Libraries in 1962. The library is named after Gideon Brand van Zyl, a former Governor-General of South Africa; van Zyl was the son of 19th-century law professor Casper Hendrik van Zyl, and he donated his family's extensive collection of literature on Roman-Dutch law in 1949.

=== Post-apartheid ===
After the end of apartheid in 1994, all UCT faculties provided equal access to all race groups and implemented strong affirmative action programmes. Nonetheless, like other UCT faculties, the Faculty of Law was affected by the #RhodesMustFall and #FeesMustFall protests between 2015 and 2017. Groups of law students complained that the faculty was "white-dominated", with a lower proportion of black students than the overall university; that it was afflicted by institutional racism; and that its syllabus neglected African customary law. They also complained that the academic staff comprised "predominantly white lecturers", though at the time it had the second-highest proportion (29 per cent) of black South African academics of any UCT division. Penelope Andrews, who was appointed as dean of the faculty at the beginning of 2016, argued publicly that there was "generally universal support for transformation" in the faculty, but that practical institutional change was hampered, inter alia, by generational divides in the faculty and the "veneration of an academic tradition mostly steeped in the British and northern European model." After Andrews resigned in 2018, an internal panel investigated internal divisions in the faculty; its report concurred with disgruntled students that, "The demographic of the faculty is profoundly white and the culture tends to be male dominated."

During the same period, in November 2017, the law faculty was briefly in danger of losing its accreditation, as the national Council of Higher Education announced that it had given the faculty six months to respond to various concerns that emerged during a review of the LLB programme. These concerns pertained to the institution's academic support for black law students and the success rate of black students in general.

In the winter of 2024, amid an upswing in the Israeli–Palestinian conflict, the faculty attracted controversy after professor Anton Fagan set an LLB delict exam with questions about a hypothetical scenario involving a fictional school shooting outside a Jewish school; in the facts stipulated by Fagan, the shooter was a white, schizophrenic neo-Nazi who passed himself off as a Muslim supporter of Palestine. After the exam, a group of law students called UCT4Palestine circulated a petition which described the exam as offensive, Islamophobic, and infected with Fagan's personal Zionist bias (Fagan being an outspoken supporter of Israel); the university's Law Student Council also lodged an official complaint about the exam with the faculty's dean. Fagan publicly defended his exam question, but he voluntarily took early retirement from UCT during the ensuing controversy; he told the South African Jewish Report that he did so because, "As a consequence of the question that I set for my delict students in their recent examination, I was asked to move my retirement forward [by 18 months]." UCT academics David Benatar and Timothy Crowe joined the South African Jewish Board of Deputies in accusing the law faculty of mistreating Fagan. When the UCT Senate subsequently voted to deny emeritus status to Fagan, UCT academics Nicoli Nattrass and Jeremy Seekings wrote in the Daily Maverick that the administration had "cancelled" Fagan.

As of 2024, the Faculty of Law was UCT's smallest faculty, enrolling about 1,200 undergraduate and postgraduate students annually.

== Academics ==
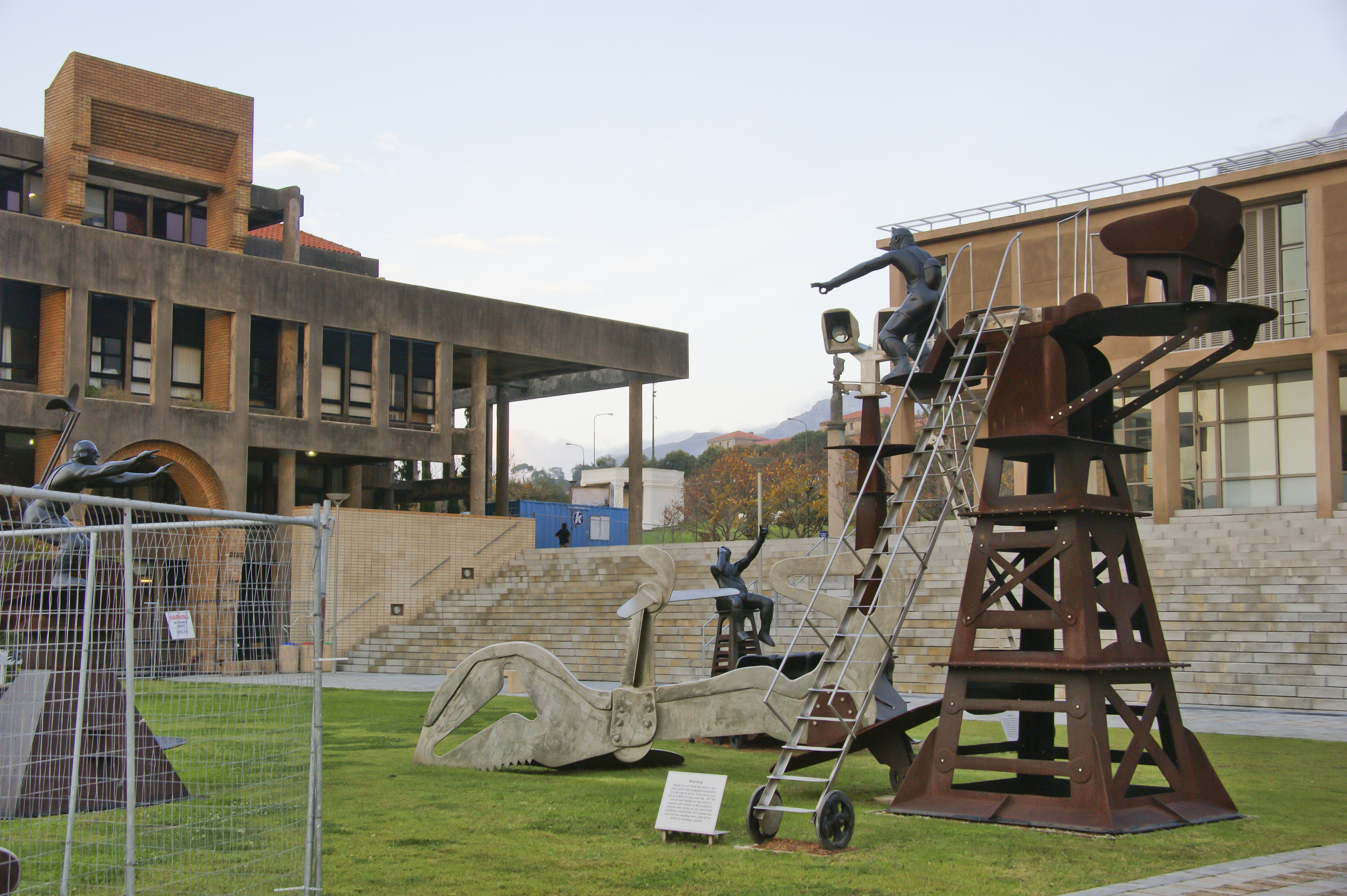
The side façade of the Kramer Building, with the sculpture Dialogue at the Dogwatch in the foreground

=== Degree programmes ===
The Faculty of Law offers the LLB as both an undergraduate and a postgraduate degree. Other postgraduate certifications – diplomas, LLMs, MPhils, and PhDs – are offered through the faculty's School for Advanced Legal Studies. Separately, the faculty's Law@work unit provides short courses, seminars, and workshops to the general public.

=== Research programmes ===
Across three academic departments, the faculty hosts 13 different specialised research units. The Department of Public Law houses the Centre of Criminology, the Centre for Law & Society, the Institute of Marine & Environmental Law, the Democratic Governance & Rights Unit (which encompasses AfricanLII, JIFA, Judges Matter, and Magistrates Matter), the Land & Accountability Research Centre, and the Refugee Rights Unit. The Department of Commercial Law houses the Centre for Comparative Law in Africa, the Corporate Law and Governance Unit, the iNtaka Centre for Law & Technology (which encompasses the LawTechLab), the Intellectual Property Law and Policy Research Unit, the Labour Development & Governance Research Unit, the Shipping Law Unit, and the UCT Tax Unit for Fiscal Research. Finally, the Department of Private Law houses the Centre for Rhetoric Studies and the Mineral Law in Africa unit.

The oldest research unit is the Centre of Criminology, which was established in 1977 as the Institute of Criminology; it was led first by Jannie van Rooyen and then by Rob Nairn. In its current iteration, it is attached to the Faculty of Humanities, as well as the Faculty of Law, and runs the Legal Education Action Project.

== Student life ==
LLB students are required to complete pro bono community service as a compulsory component of the degree. The two specialised on-campus law clinics are the UCT Law Clinic and the Refugee Rights Clinic. Other student organisations include the Law Students' Council (the faculty's student representative council); the Chamber of Legal Students; and chapters of Law and Social Justice, the Black Lawyers' Association, and SHAWCO. There is also a student moot society, which is based at the university's Oliver Tambo Moot Court (established in 2001 in Oliver Tambo's honour).

The faculty's law journal is Acta Juridica, founded in 1956 by Professor Ben-Zion Beinart and published annually by Juta and Company since 2001. Another publication, a quarterly student magazine called Altum Sonatur, was founded in 2010.

== Rankings ==
Subject-specific university ranking services generally rank UCT's law faculty as the best or among the best on the African continent. In 2023 it was ranked 151–175 worldwide by Times Higher Education, 151–200 by QS, and 201–300 in the Shanghai Ranking. In some prior rankings it was included in the top 100 worldwide.

== Affiliations ==
The Faculty of Law is a member of the Law Schools Global League. In line with its internationalisation policy, it has academic collaboration agreements with counterpart law faculties at various universities: the University of Nigeria, University of Dar Es Salaam, University of Hargeisa, University of Jos, University of Bissau, National University of Rwanda, Renmin University of China, Kyushu University, National Law School of India, Paraiba State University, International University College of Turin, University of Lisbon, Swiss Institute of Comparative Law, and, most recently, University of Notre Dame.

== List of deans ==
- Danwood Chirwa, 2019–present
- Penelope Andrews, 2016–2018
- P. J. Schwikkard, 2009–2015
- Hugh Corder, 1999–2008
- Danie Visser, 1996–1998

== Notable academic staff ==
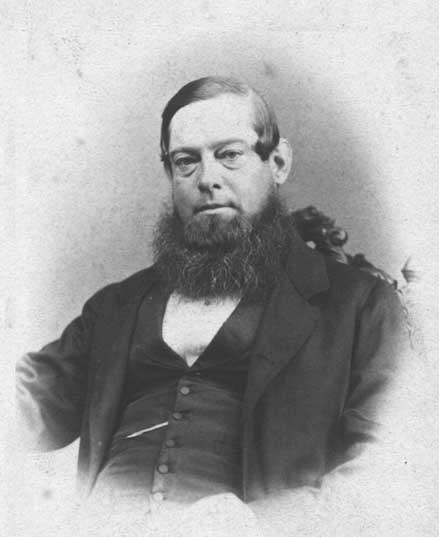
Jan Brand, the faculty's first law professor, c. 1864

- Jan Brand, inaugural professor of law
- Hugh Corder, professor of public law
- Drucilla Cornell, South African Research Chair in customary law, indigenous values and dignity jurisprudence
- Dennis Davis, professor of commercial law
- Pierre de Vos, Claude Leon Foundation professor of constitutional law
- Johannes Christiaan de Wet, Schreiner professor of Roman law
- Raylene Keightley, lecturer in law
- Rashida Manjoo, professor of public law
- Donald Molteno, professor of public law
- Rob Nairn, professor of law and criminology, director of the Institute of Criminology
- Caroline Ncube, South African Research Chair in intellectual property, innovation, and development
- Kate O'Regan, lecturer in law, honorary professor
- Nicola Peart, lecturer
- Don Pinnock, research associate at the Centre of Criminology
- Albie Sachs, honorary professor of public law
- Philippe-Joseph Salazar, distinguished professor in rhetoric, director of the Centre for Rhetoric Studies
- Jack Simons, professor of African law and administration
- David Unterhalter, professor of law
- Belinda van Heerden, professor of law
- Reinhard Zimmermann, Schreiner professor of Roman law

== Notable alumni ==
=== Academia ===
- Cathi Albertyn
- Hugh Corder
- Beric John Croome (PhD)
- Sadulla Karjiker
- Claire Palley
- Raymond Suttner
- Colin Turpin

=== Judiciary ===
- Fikile Bam
- Harry Elinder Davies
- Dennis Davis
- John Didcott
- Hannes Fagan
- Ian Farlam
- Gerald Friedman
- Bennie Goldin
- Patricia Goliath (LLM)
- Glenn Goosen
- Ernie Grosskopf
- Edwin King
- Frank Kroon
- Harold Levy
- Robin Marais
- Shehnaz Meer
- George Munnik
- Cagney Musi (LLM)
- Caroline Nicholls
- Kate O'Regan
- Vincent Quénet
- Owen Rogers
- Albie Sachs
- Vincent Saldanha
- Ashton Schippers (LLM)
- Douglas Scott
- Hilary Squires
- Theunie Steyn
- Pat Tebbutt
- Newton Ogilvie Thompson
- Theo van Wyk
- Deneys Molteno Williamson

=== Legal practice ===
- Jason Brickhill
- Geoff Budlender
- Hermione Cronje
- Ezra Davids
- Graham Duncan
- Willie Hofmeyr
- Jeffrey Jowell
- Wallace Mgoqi
- Milton Seligson
- Michael Tselentis
- Percy Yutar

=== Politics and activism ===
- Luzelle Adams (LLM)
- David Bloomberg
- Sheila Camerer
- Michael Comay
- Johnny de Lange
- Cissie Gool
- Fink Haysom
- Sam Kahn
- Chaeli Mycroft (MPhil)
- Dullah Omar
- Bhadra Ranchod
- Neville Rubin
- Harry Snitcher
- John Wiley
- Donald Woods

=== Business ===
- Brett Kebble

== See also ==
- Law of South Africa
- Legal education in South Africa
