= Fatsah Ouguergouz =

Algerian international law scholar and judge

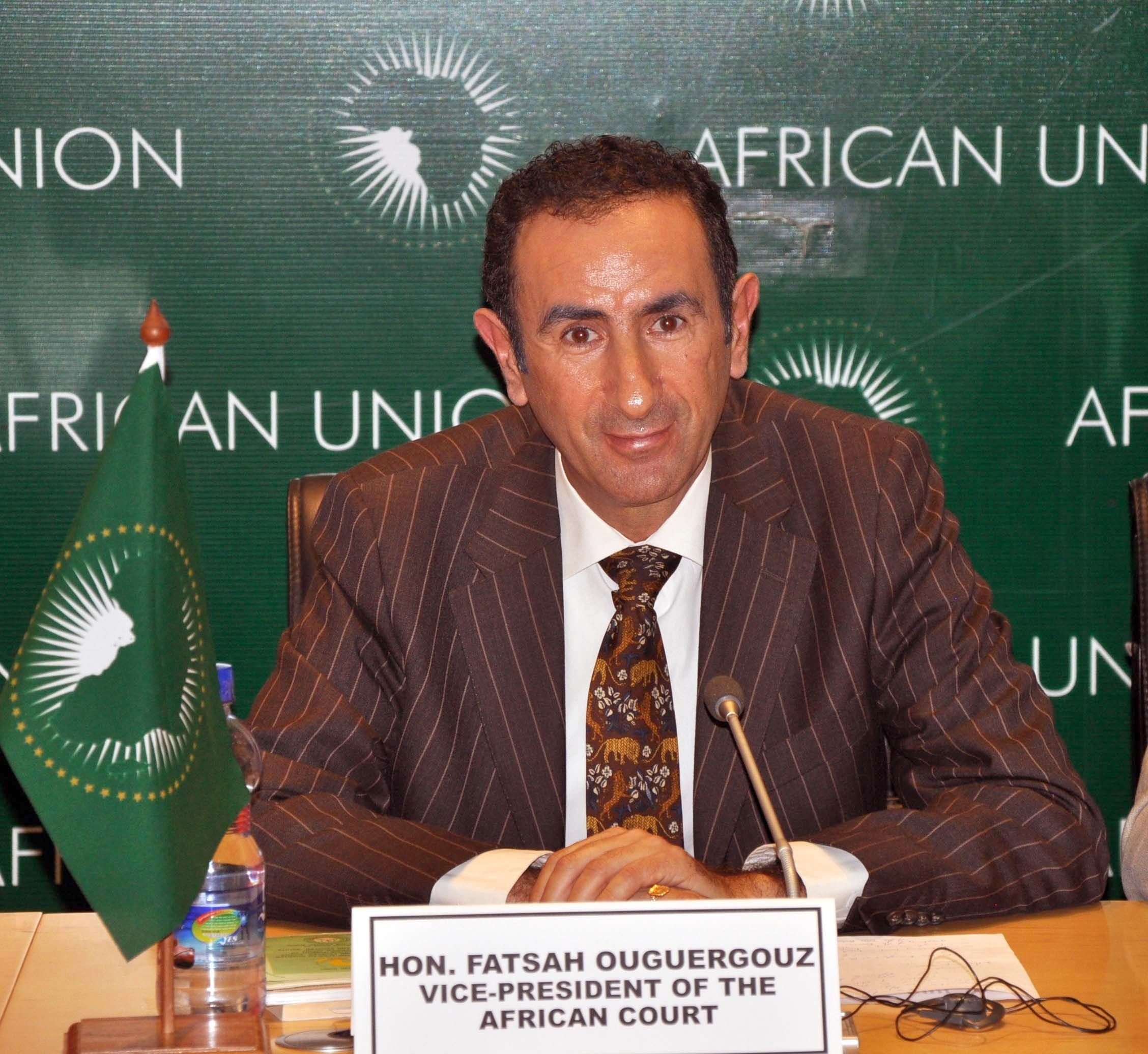
- Vice-President of the African Court on Human and Peoples' Rights (2013)
- Born: 1958 (age 67–68)
- Education: Jean Monnet University (Licence en droit Graduate Institute of International Studies (Ph.D.)
- Occupations: Judge, Arbitrator, Legal Academic
- Notable work: The African Union: Legal and Institutional Framework: A Manual on the Pan-African Organization (2012); The African Charter of Human and Peoples' Rights: A Comprehensive Agenda for Human Dignity and Sustainable Democracy in Africa (2003)
- Title: Judge, Dr.

Vice-President of the African Court on Human and Peoples’ Rights
- In office 2012–2013
- Preceded by: Sophia Akuffo
- Succeeded by: Bernard Ngoepe

Fatsah Ouguergouz is an Algerian jurist who has had a distinguished career as an international judge and legal expert. He has specialized in international law, human rights and international dispute resolution. Ouguergouz served as a Judge and Vice-President of the African Court on Human and Peoples’ Rights, and has held key positions within the United Nations legal system. He is a Member of the Institute of International Law.

== Education ==
Fatsah Ouguergouz received his Licence en droit from the Faculty of Law of Jean Monnet University (Université de Saint-Étienne) in Saint-Étienne, France in 1980. He earned a Ph.D. in international law from the Graduate Institute of International Studies in Geneva, Switzerland in 1991.

== Legal and judicial career ==
=== United Nations System ===
==== Secretariat ====
Ouguergouz started his United Nations legal career as a Legal Officer in the United Nations Office of Legal Affairs at United Nations Headquarters in New York City (1992-1994). In 1994, he was appointed a Human Rights Officer in Rwanda by the United Nations High Commissioner for Human Rights.

==== International Court of Justice ====
Ouguergouz was Special Assistant to Judge Mohammed Bedjaoui, the President of the International Court of Justice 1995-1997. He worked as a Legal Officer in the Registry of the Court 1997-2000 and was then promoted to become the Secretary of the Court 2000-2006.

==== United Nations reports on Burundi ====
Ouguergouz was appointed by the United Nations Human Rights Council to serve as the Independent Expert on the Situation of Human Rights in Burundi (2010-2011). The Human Rights Council later appointed him President of the UN Commission of Inquiry on Burundi (2016-2018). His reports contributed to investigations of human rights violations, accountability efforts in Burundi and the authorization of an investigation by the Prosecutor of the International Criminal Court into the situation in Burundi.

==== UNESCO ====
Ouguergouz has been Chairperson of the High-Level Panel of International Legal Experts established by the Conference of States Parties to the International Convention against Doping in Sport appointed by UNESCO in Paris since 2022.

=== African Court on Human and Peoples’ Rights ===
In 2006 Ouguergouz was in the first group of judges elected by the Assembly of Heads of States of the African Union to the African Court on Human and Peoples’ Rights, based in Arusha, Tanzania. He was a Judge from 2006 to 2016, and served as Vice-President of the Court 2012-2013. Elected initially in 2006 for a four-year term, he was re-elected in 2010 for a six-year mandate.

==== Major judgments at the African Court on Human and Peoples’ Rights ====
While serving on the Court, Ouguergouz authored 23 separate or dissenting opinions which helped shape the Court’s jurisprudence on admissibility, jurisdiction and interpretation of the African Charter on Human and Peoples' Rights. Notable opinions include:

- Michelot Yogogombaye v. Republic of Senegal (Application No. 001/2008, 15 December 2009): This was the Court’s first judgment. Ouguergouz wrote a separate opinion emphasizing jurisdictional issues, particularly the requirement of a state’s consent to the Court’s jurisdiction. He elaborated on the principle of forum prorogatum and the Court’s handling of applications despite states not having made prior declarations accepting its jurisdiction. His analysis clarified the consent and sovereignty principles underpinning the Court’s competence to hear cases from individuals and non-governmental organizations.
- Femi Falana v. African Union (Application No. 001/2011, 26 June 2012): In this case, Ouguergouz authored a separate concurring opinion clarifying procedural issues concerning the Court’s discretion to reject applications outright for lack of jurisdiction. His analysis helped clarify the Court’s jurisdictional threshold for admissibility and case handling.

Other separate or dissenting opinions dealt with legal principles such as the exhaustion of local remedies, non-retroactivity of criminal law, and interpretation of the African Charter on Human and Peoples’ Rights. His opinions have been recognized as vital for clarifying and advancing the Court’s jurisprudential framework even when they were not part of the Court’s binding rulings and making significant contributions to African international law.

=== African Court of Justice and Human Rights ===
In 2005 Ouguergouz co-drafted with Mohammed Bedjaoui, then Minister of Foreign Affairs of Algeria, the Protocol establishing the African Court of Justice and Human Rights, which was adopted by the Assembly of the African Union in July 2008.

=== African Development Bank ===
Ouguergouz has been a Judge on the Administrative Tribunal of the African Development Bank located in Abidjan, Ivory Coast since 2023.

=== Arbitration ===
Ouguergouz has wide-ranging experience in international arbitration. He has served as an independent arbitrator and legal consultant in various cases under UNCITRAL Arbitration Rules and at the Permanent Court of Arbitration. In addition, he is a member of a number of panels of judges and arbitrators:

- Member of the International Commercial Expert Committee (ICEC) of the China International Commercial Court (CICC) of the Supreme People’s Court of the People's Republic of China (Shenzhen, China)
- Member of the panel of arbitrators of China International Economic and Trade Commission (CIETAC) (Beijing, China)
- Member of the panel of arbitrators of South China International Arbitration Center (HK) (SCIAHK) (Hong Kong, China)
- Member of the panel of arbitrators of Shenzhen Court of International Arbitration (SCIA) (Shenzhen)
- Member of the panel of arbitrators of Energy Disputes Arbitration Center (EDAC) (Ankara, Turkey)
- Member of the Advisory Committee of Beihai Asia International Arbitration Centre (BAIAC) (Singapore)

=== Other ===
In 2020, he was a Member of the Committee of Experts on the revision of the Algerian Constitution, established by the President of Algeria Abdelmadjid Tebboune.

== Academic positions and activities ==
Since 2022, Ouguergouz has been the Rector of the African Institute of International Law based in Arusha. He has been a Visiting Professor of International Law at the Graduate Institute of International and Development Studies in Geneva since 2023.

Ouguergouz was Lecturer in the Department of Public International Law and International Organization of the University of Geneva Law Faculty from 1989 to 1992. He held the Orville H. Schell Fellowship at Yale Law School during 1991-1992 and was the Robert F. Drinan, S.J. Professor of Human Rights at Georgetown University Law Center in Washington, D.C. in 2008. Ouguergouz has been a visiting professor of international law at institutions such as the Université Panthéon-Assas (Paris II) (2008), the Geneva Academy of International Humanitarian Law and Human Rights (2014) and the University of Buenos Aires (2019). In 2018, he was Senior Fellow at the Graduate Institute of International and Development Studies in Geneva and taught a course at The Hague Academy of International Law on "The Protection of the Rights of Individuals in African International Law" (Le droit international africain et la protection des droits de l’individu). In 2025, he taught a course on "The Public Law of Africa and the Protection of Human and Peoples Rights" as part of the XXI Winter Course on International Law (XXI Curso de Inverno de Direito Internacional) at the Centro de Direito Internacional e do Centro de Estudos em Direito e Negócios (CEDIN) in Belo Horizonte, Brazil. Ouguergouz is regularly a guest lecturer at institutions such as the International Institute of Human Rights in Strasbourg, France. He has been an International Senior Expert at the United Nations Institute for Training and Research (UNITAR) in Geneva since 2009.

== Selected publications and editorial work ==
- The African Union: Legal and Institutional Framework: A Manual on the Pan-African Organization (co-editor with Abdulqawi Yusuf), (Martinus Nijhoff Publishers, 2012) ISBN 9789004221000
- The African Charter of Human and Peoples' Rights: A Comprehensive Agenda for Human Dignity and Sustainable Democracy in Africa (Nijhoff Publishers, 2003) ISBN 9789041120618
- La Charte africaine des droits de l’homme et des peuples – Une approche juridique des droits de l’homme entre tradition et modernité (Presses Universitaires de France, 1993) ISBN 2130453252
- “The Protection of Chinese Investments in Africa: a Brief Overview of Investor-State Dispute Settlement Mechanisms”, African Yearbook of International Law, Volume 23, 2017, pp. 194-206

He is the author of numerous other publications in English and in French.

Ouguergouz was Associate Editor of the African Yearbook of International Law (Editor-in-chief of the French edition) (1992-2018), and is now a member of the Editorial Advisory Board of the African Yearbook of International Law and of the Jinan Journal for Human Rights (in Arabic) (Tripoli, Lebanon), and of the International Editorial Advisory Board of the African Human Rights Law Journal (Centre for Human Rights, University of Pretoria Faculty of Law). Previously, he had been a member of the Advisory Board of Oxford University Press's Oxford Reports on International Law in Domestic Courts (ILDC).

== Memberships of boards and institutions ==
Ouguergouz has been a Commissioner of the International Commission of Jurists (Geneva) since 2015. He was elected a Titular Member (Membre titulaire) of the Institute of International Law (Institut de Droit International) at its 2025 Session in Rabat, Morocco, having previously been an Associate (Associé) from 2021.

He is a member of the Board of Trustees of the Fondation Abi-Saab pour le droit international et la justice sociale (Geneva), Honorary Committee of the Fondation Kéba Mbaye (Dakar, Senegal), a Patron of the African Association of International Law (Banjul, The Gambia), a member of the Société française pour le droit international SFDI (Paris), of the Advisory Board of the Strathmore Institute for Advanced Studies in International Criminal Justice (Nairobi, Kenya), founding member and member of the Curatorium of the African Institute of International Law (Arusha), and founding member, Board member and former Executive Director of the African Foundation for International Law (AFIL) (The Hague). He has been a member of the Governing Board of the International Institute of Human Rights (Strasbourg) and of the International Advisory Committee of the Brandeis Institute for International Judges at Brandeis University (Waltham, Massachusetts, United States). From 2014 to 2016, he was Senior Policy Advisor of the Geneva Centre for Human Rights Advancement and Global Dialogue.

== Honors ==
In 2024 Ouguergouz was named to the "Hall of Fame" of the Geneva Graduate Institute’s most illustrious former students.

== See also ==
- Dr. Fatsah Ouguergouz
