= List of law schools in South Africa =

Location of South Africa

University of Pretoria Faculty of Law

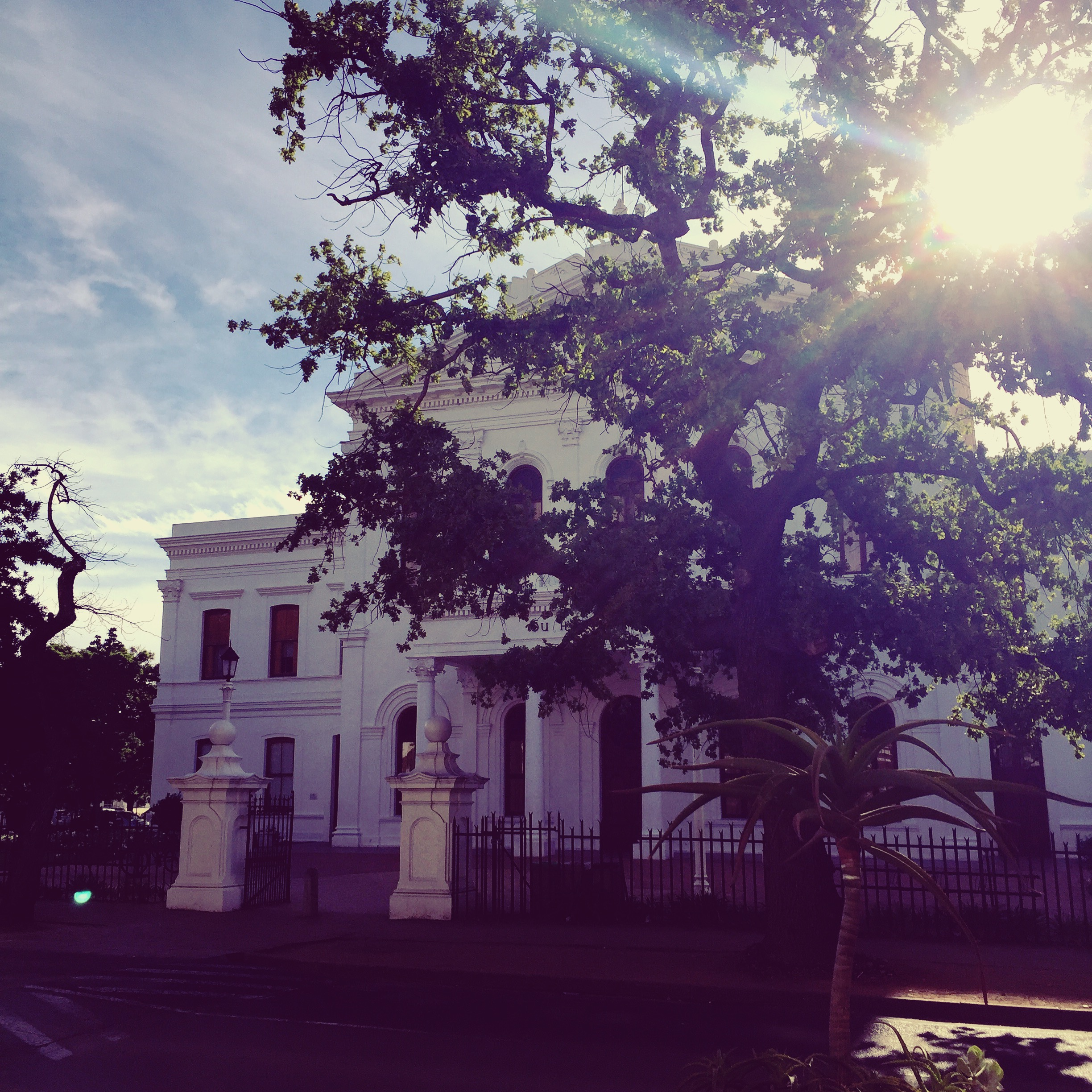
University of Stellenbosch Faculty of Law

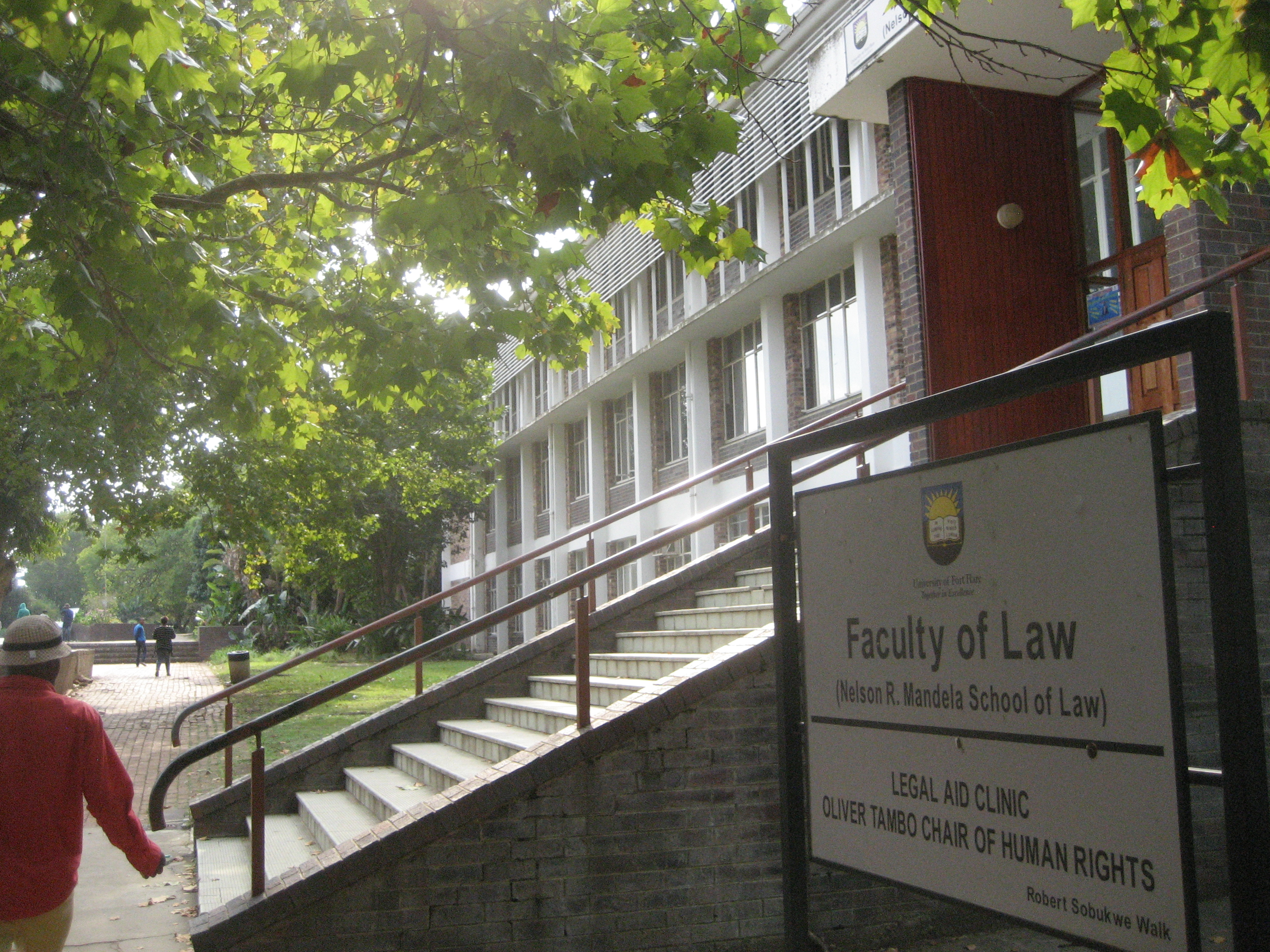
University of Fort Hare Faculty of Law

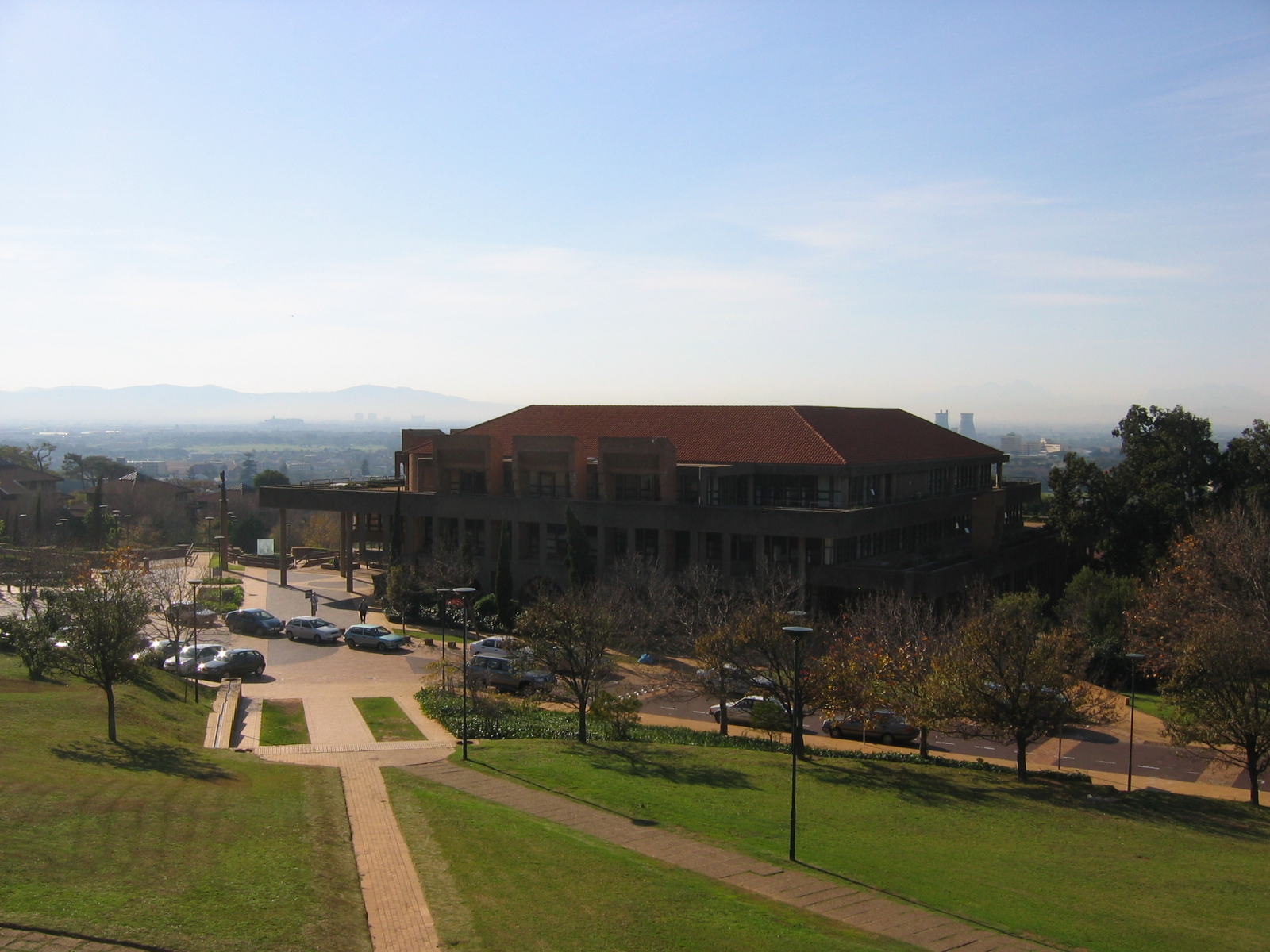
University of Cape Town Kramer Law School

This is a list of law schools in South Africa.

== Law schools ==
Institution	Law school	Founded	Location
University of the Witwatersrand	Oliver Schreiner School of Law		Johannesburg
Regenesys Education	Regenesys Law School		Johannesburg
University of Cape Town	Faculty of Law	1859	Cape Town
University of Fort Hare	Faculty of Law		Alice, East London
University of the Free State	Faculty of Law		Bloemfontein
University of Johannesburg	Faculty of Law		Johannesburg
University of KwaZulu-Natal	Faculty of Law	2004	Durban, Pietermaritzburg
University of Limpopo	Faculty of Law		Polokwane
North-West University	Faculty of Law Potchefstroom Campus	1955	Potchefstroom
Nelson Mandela University	Faculty of Law		Port Elizabeth
University of Pretoria	Faculty of Law	1908 (Note: Legal education commenced in 1908 with the faculty formally founded in 1918.)	Pretoria
Rhodes University	Faculty of Law		Grahamstown
University of South Africa	College of Law		Distance education
University of Stellenbosch	Faculty of Law	1921	Stellenbosch
University of Venda	Faculty of Law		Thohoyandou
University of the Western Cape	Faculty of Law & Commerce		Bellville (Cape Town)
University of the Witwatersrand	Faculty of Commerce, Law and Management		Johannesburg
North-West University	Faculty of Law		Mafikeng
University of Zululand	Faculty of Law		
IIE Varsity College	School of Law	2017 (First intake in 2018).	Cape Town Durban Johannesburg Pretoria

== Mooting in South Africa ==
The following moot court competitions are either held in South Africa or organised by a South Africa institution:

Moot court	Institution	Founded	Location
Public Interest Law Moot Court Competition	Organised annually by the Student Litigation Society in collaboration with the Centre for Applied Legal Studies	2020	Qualifying Rounds are held virtually and the Grand Finale at the Constitutional Court in Braamfontein
African Human Rights Moot Court Competition	Organised by the University of Pretoria Faculty of Law	1992	Held at participating law schools across the African continent
Kovsies first year's Moot Court Competition	Organised by the University of the Free State		Bloemfontein
South African National Schools Moot Court Competition	Organised annually by a different grouping of law schools	2011	National oral rounds take place at the University of Pretoria Faculty of Law, Pretoria and the finals at the Constitutional Court in Johannesburg
World Human Rights Moot Court Competition	Organised by the University of Pretoria Faculty of Law	2009	Pretoria
African Trade Moot	Organised by the University of Pretoria Faculty of Law, University of the Western Cape		Pretoria and Cape Town
Manfred Lachs Space Law Moot Court Competition	Organised by the International Institute of Space Law		The Africa Regional Round is hosted by the Institute for International and Comparative Law in Africa, University of Pretoria Faculty of Law
Kate O'Regan Annual Intervarsity Moot Competition	Organised by the University of Cape Town	2017	

== See also ==
- Bachelor of Laws: South Africa
- Doctor of Law: South Africa
- Law of South Africa
- Legal education in South Africa
- List of universities in South Africa
- Lists of law schools
- Master of Laws: South Africa
