= Jack Watermeyer =

South African judge

The Honourable Jack Watermeyer QC

Judge President of the Cape Provincial Division
- In office 1979–1981
- Preceded by: Helm van Zijl
- Succeeded by: George Munnik

Judge of the Cape Provincial Division of the Supreme Court of South Africa
- In office 1955–1979

Personal details
- Born: Henry Ernest Peter Watermeyer; 3 July 1911 Wynberg, Cape Town, Cape Province, Union of South Africa
- Died: 21 October 2003 (aged 92) Cape Town, Western Cape, South Africa
- Relations: Ernest Frederick Watermeyer (father)
- Education: Gonville and Caius College, Cambridge
- Profession: Advocate

Henry Ernest Peter "Jack" Watermeyer QC (3 July 1911 – 21 October 2003) was a South African judge and Judge President of the Cape Provincial Division of the Supreme Court from 1979 until 1981.

== Early life and education ==
Watermeyer was born in Wynberg, Cape Town, the son of was the former Chief Justice of South Africa, Ernest Frederick Watermeyer and his wife, Petronella Hester Wege. He was educated at Rondebosch Boys' High School and Bishops and after school he studied law at Gonville and Caius College, Cambridge. At Cambridge he obtain a B.A. degree and he passed the Law Tripos.

== Career ==
Watermeyer was admitted to the bar in England as a member of the Inner Temple and then returned to South Africa, to become a member of the Cape Bar in 1934. After the outbreak of World War II, he served in the South African Artillery with the 6th Armoured Division in Italy.

Watermeyer returned to the Bar in 1945 and was appointed a King's Counsel in 1950. Shortly after taking silk, he acted as a judge at the Cape Provincial Division and in 1955, he was permanently appointed to the Cape Division, being one of a group of four exceptional appointees: the others were Andrew Beyers, Theo van Wyk and Marius Diemont. He became Judge-President of the Cape Division in 1979 and retired in 1981.

== Golf participation ==
Watermeyer was South African amateur golf champion in 1940 and Western Province amateur golf champion in 1946 and 1949. He served on the Executive of the South African Golf Union for twenty-seven years from 1938 until 1964, and was the non-playing captain of the South African team which played in the 1962 Eisenhower Trophy in Japan. Watermeyer was posthumously inducted into the Southern Africa Golf Hall of Fame, in 2010.
