= R v Patel =

South African legal case

- Court: Appellate Division
- Full case name: R v Patel
- Decided: 18 May 1959
- Citation: 1959 (3) SA 121 (A)

Court membership
- Judges sitting: Steyn CJ, AB Beyers JA and Holmes AJA

Case opinions
- Decision by: Holmes AJA

Keywords
- Criminal law, Murder, Culpable homicide, Self-defence

R v Patel is an important case in South African criminal law, heard on May 8, 1959. The appellant's attorneys were Levy, Rogaly & Cohen, Pretoria, and S. and v A Rosendorff, Bloemfontein. The Appellate Division ruled that "a person has the same right to use force in the defence of another from a threatened danger, as he would have to defend himself, if he were the person threatened."

== Facts ==
The matter arose from an appeal against a conviction for culpable homicide. Evidence showed that the appellant’s brother had been attacked from behind with a hammer and was left crouching, facing the risk of another potentially fatal blow to the head. The appellant had in this critical situation used the only weapon to hand: his revolver. He had fired at the deceased and killed him.

== Judgment ==
The general principles mentioned by Watermeyer CJ, in R v Attwood, are that an accused is entitled to an acquittal on the ground that he was acting in self-defence if it appears as a reasonable possibility on the evidence

- "that he had been unlawfully attacked and had reasonable ground for thinking that he was in danger of death or serious injury. (Though there may be cases of lawful self-defence where the accused was originally the aggressor;"
- "that the means of self-defence which he used were not excessive in relation to the danger;" and
- "that the means he used were the only or least dangerous means whereby he could have avoided the danger."

The court in Patel appeared to approve this view, holding that a person has the same right to use force in the defence of another from a threatened danger as he would have to defend himself, if he were the person threatened. The Crown had failed to prove beyond reasonable doubt that the accused had exceeded the bounds of justifiable homicide.

== See also ==
- Crime
- Law of South Africa
- South African criminal law
