= Helm van Zijl =

South African judge

The Honourable Helm van Zijl QC

Judge President of the Cape Provincial Division
- In office 1975–1979
- Preceded by: Theo van Wyk
- Succeeded by: Jack Watermeyer

Judge of the Cape Provincial Division of the Supreme Court
- In office 1950–1975

Personal details
- Born: Jacobus Wilhelmus van Zijl; 22 December 1909 Cape Town, Cape Colony
- Died: 22 January 1992 (aged 82)
- Education: Stellenbosch University
- Profession: Advocate

Jacobus Wilhelmus van Zijl QC (22 December 1909 – 22 January 1992) was a South African judge and Judge President of the Cape Provincial Division of the Supreme Court from 1975 until 1979.

== Early life and education ==
Van Zijl was born in Cape Town, the son of justice, Hendrik Stephanus van Zyl and his wife, Dorothy Constantia Sauer. He matriculated at Rondebosch Boys' High School, after which he studied law at the University of Stellenbosch.

== Career ==
Van Zijl started practising as an advocate in 1933 and became a member of the Cape Bar. In 1950 he was permanently appointed a judge to the Cape Provincial Division of the Supreme Court. After the death of Justice Theo van Wyk in 1975, he was appointed as Judge President of the Cape Provincial Division.

In 1950, the South African government set up a Press Commission to monitor the activities of the press and Van Zijl was appointed its first chairman.
