= Joos Hefer =

South African judge (born 1931)

The Honourable Joos Hefer SC

Acting President of the Supreme Court of Appeal of South Africa
- In office 2002–2003
- Preceded by: Office established (position, until December 2001, had the title of Chief Justice)
- Succeeded by: Craig Howie

Acting Chief Justices of South Africa
- In office 2001–2001
- Succeeded by: position replaced by President of the Supreme Court of Appeal of South Africa

Judge of the Supreme Court of Appeal of South Africa
- In office 1984–2001

Chief Justice of the Transkei High Court
- In office 1981–1984
- Preceded by: George Munnik
- Succeeded by: T. H. van Reenen

Judge of the Natal Provincial Division
- In office 1976–1981

Personal details
- Born: Josephus Johannes Francois Hefer; 21 December 1931 (age 94) Brandfort, Union of South Africa
- Education: University of the Orange Free State
- Profession: Attorney, Advocate

Josephus Johannes Francois "Joos" Hefer (born 21 December 1931) is a South African judge and former Acting President of the Supreme Court of Appeal of South Africa.

== Early life and education ==
Hefer was born in Brandfort, in the Free State and matriculated in 1949 in Bloemfontein. He studied at the University of the Orange Free State and obtained his BA degree in 1953 and LLB in 1955. In 1995 he obtained an LLM degree from UNISA.

== Career ==
Hefer practised as an attorney from 1955 to 1957 and joined the Free State Bar in 1957, where he practised until 1975. He became a senior advocaat in 1972 and during the same year he first act as a judge in Bloemfontein. He also acted as a judge at the Northern Cape Division in Kimberley, the South West Africa Division in Windhoek and Durban & Coast Local Division in Durban.

On the 1st of February 1976, Hefer was appointed judge in the Natal Provincial Division and in August 1981, he was appointed Chief Justice of the Transkei High Court. Two years later he was appointed acting judge of appeal in Bloemfontein and in 1984 he was permanently appointed as judge of appeal. During 2001 he acted as chief justice until his retirement in December 2001. However, at the request of the Minister of Justice, Hefer was appointed as acting President of the Supreme Court of Appel from January 2002 to 31 December 2002.

In 2003, Hefer was appointed by President Thabo Mbeki to chair the commission of inquiry into allegations of spying made against National Director of Public Prosecutions Bulelani Ngcuka.

== Honours and awards ==
Hefer was awarded an honorary LLD from the University of the Free State.
