= South African National Schools Moot Court Competition =

The South African National Schools Moot Court Competition is an annual moot court competition established in 2011 aimed at creating greater consciousness and understanding in South African schools and communities about the Constitution of the Republic of South Africa and the values embodied by it through the active participation of learners in a moot court competition.

The finalists automatically qualify to represent South Africa at the International Schools Moot Court Competition, hosted in the Hague, in the Netherlands.

This year's winners of the 14th Annual National Schools Moot Court Competition were Thabiso Mkhabela and Johannah Maredi from Kopanang Senior Secondary School in Mpumalanga. Thabiso Mkhabela and his teammate Johannah Maredi won the Best Oralist Accolade. Along them was Ndamase Secondary School from Eastern Cape.</ref>insideeducation</ref>

Thabiso Mkhabela and Johannah Maredi will represent South Africa in the Neatherlands, The Hague, at the 2025-26 International Moot Court Competition.</ref>insideeducation</ref> South African law school.

== Format ==
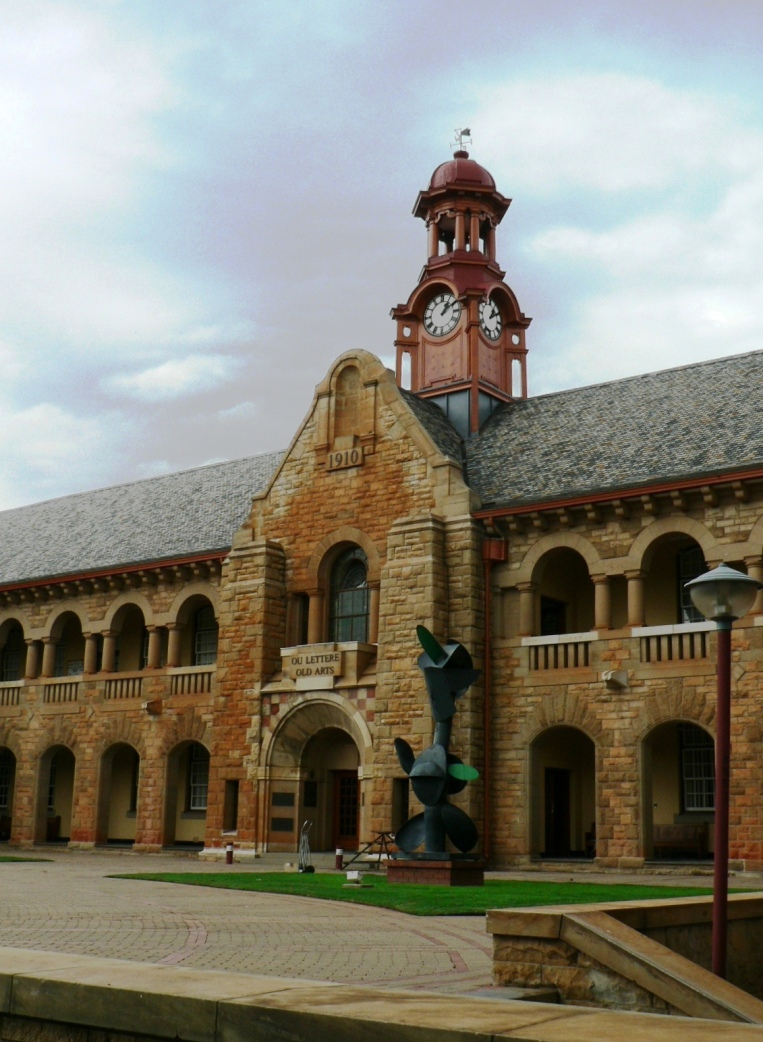
Semi-final oral rounds are held at the University of Pretoria.

University of Pretoria Faculty of Law building

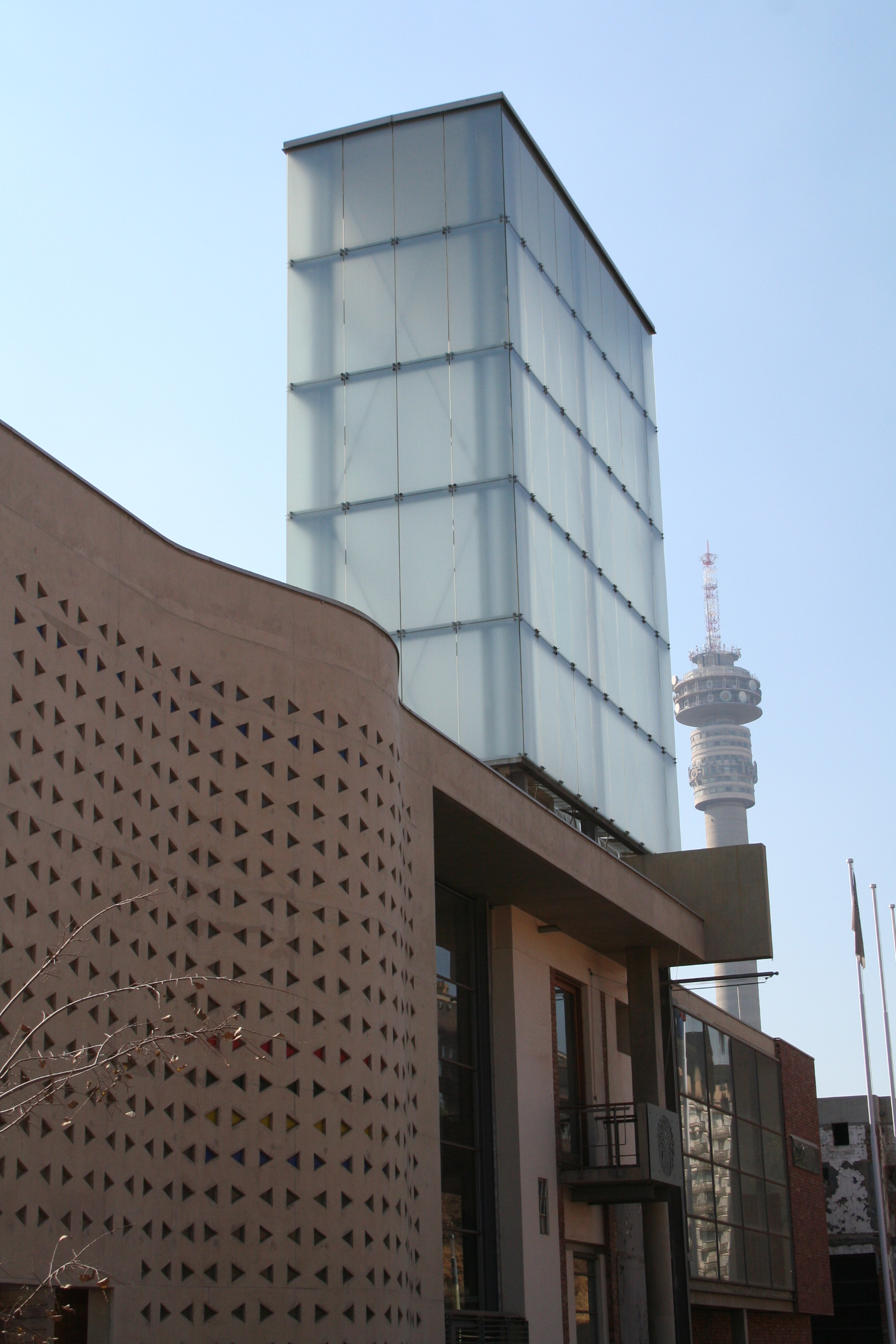
The final oral round is held at the Constitutional Court of South Africa.

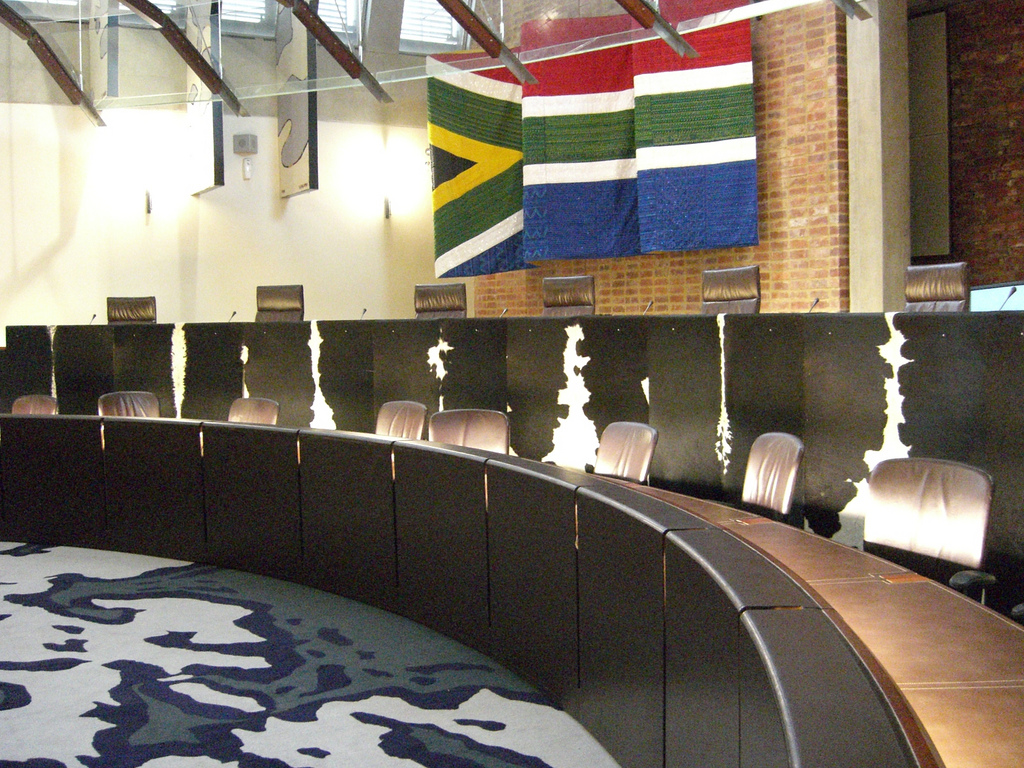
Constitutional Court of South Africa courtroom

The moot is divided into written and oral rounds. All secondary schools in South Africa are invited to send a team of two grade-10 or 11 learners to submit two short essays, each arguing the opposing view of the set fictional question. A panel of experts evaluate the submissions and select the four best submissions from each of South Africa's nine provinces which are then invited to the semi-final oral rounds held at the University of Pretoria, with the winners arguing in the final round at the Constitutional Court of South Africa, Johannesburg. In the inaugural competition, 32 teams competed in the provincial rounds. However, as of 2019, the Moot problem has been made a part of the school curriculum, reaching a potential 2 million learners.

The moot court is organised and supported by the Department of Basic Education, Department of Justice and Constitutional Development, South African Human Rights Commission, and University of Pretoria Faculty of Law.

== Judges ==
Year	Judge	Position
2011	Justice Dikgang Moseneke (Presiding)	Deputy Chief Justice of the Constitutional Court
	Justice Johan Froneman	Justice of the Constitutional Court
	Justice Kenneth Mthiyane	Supreme Court of Appeal Judge Acting Justice of the Constitutional Court
	Justice Zak Yacoob	Justice of the Constitutional Court
	Yanine Poc	Regional representative of the United Nations High Commissioner for Human Rights in Southern Africa
2012	Justice Bess Nkabinde (Presiding)	Justice of the Constitutional Court
	Justice Edwin Cameron	Justice of the Constitutional Court
	Ms Yasmin Sooka	Director, Foundation for Human Rights
	Dr Zonke Majodina	Chairperson of the United Nations Human Rights Committee
	Prof Ann Skelton	Director, Centre for Child Law, University of Pretoria

== Winners ==
Year	Winner	Runner-up
2025	[Thabiso Mkhabela and Johannah Maredi ]]	Brebner High School and Kgomotso High School
2012	Thengwe High School	Springfield Convent School

== See also ==
- Moot court
- List of law schools in South Africa
- World Human Rights Moot Court Competition
- African Human Rights Moot Court Competition
