= Centre for Human Rights =

Organisation promoting human rights in Africa

- Type: Academic department Non-governmental organisation
- Established: 1986
- Director: Frans Viljoen
- Location: Pretoria, Gauteng, South Africa
- Campus: Hatfield
- Affiliations: University of Pretoria
- Website: Centre for Human Rights

The Centre for Human Rights at the University of Pretoria Faculty of Law, South Africa, is an organisation dedicated to promoting human rights on the continent of Africa. The centre, founded in 1986, promotes human rights through educational outreach, including multinational conferences, seminars and publications such as Human Rights Law in Africa, The African Human Rights Law Journal, the African Human Rights Law Reports and The Constitutional Law of South Africa. The centre, which was founded during Apartheid, assisted in adapting a Bill of Rights for South Africa and contributed to creating the South African Constitution. In 2006, the centre received the UNESCO Prize for Human Rights Education, particular recognising for the LLM in Human Rights and Democratisation in Africa and the African Human Rights Moot Court Competition.

== Academic programmes ==
University of Pretoria Faculty of Law building

The centre in conjunction with the University of Pretoria Faculty of Law present the following degree courses:

- LLM in Human Rights and Democratisation in Africa – 30 students from African countries are annually admitted to the programme on a competitive basis. The programme is a joint project of the centre with Makerere University (Uganda), the University of Ghana, the Catholic University of Central Africa (Cameroon), the University of the Western Cape (South Africa), the American University in Cairo (Egypt), Eduardo Mondlane University (Mozambique) and Addis Ababa University (Ethiopia).
- LLM in International Trade and Investment Law – presented by the University of Pretoria and the University of the Western Cape (South Africa) in partnership with the Washington College of Law (USA) and the University of Amsterdam (Netherlands).
- Sexual Reproductive Rights in Africa (SRRA) - LLM/MPhil (Sexual Reproductive Rights in Africa). The Master's degree (LLM/MPhil) in Sexual and Reproductive Rights in Africa is a two-year programme that is offered as a blended learning course consisting of online interaction and residential block-weeks in Pretoria.
- Disability Rights in Africa (DRIA) - LLM/MPhil (Disability Rights in Africa). The Masters in Disability Rights in Africa is embedded in the international human rights framework, the programme explores disability rights in the light of United Nations Convention on the Rights of Persons with Disabilities and the Protocol to the African Charter on Human and Peoples’ Rights on the Rights of Persons with Disabilities in Africa
- LLM in Multidisciplinary Human Rights
- MPhil in Multidisciplinary Rights
- LLD (Human Rights)

The Centre for Human Rights was established in 1986 by a group of teachers and local leaders who wanted to use education as a tool to combat violations of human rights. At this time the apartheid system was at its peak and this was one of the ways that the people could "fight" intellectually against things getting worst. Their main concerts were increased education of violations of human rights towards: women, people with HIV, indigenous, sexual minorities, and other Marginalized peoples . Their purpose or core value was to get closer to human rights through education in South Africa and later expanded to Africa. Members are not necessarily selected, but rather have gone through one of the undergraduate, master's or doctorate's degrees. People in the communities that are working for common causes are brought in, there doesn't appear to be a reason to not accept new people unless they are against human right advocacy or have a history of doing so. The members have an impressive background; many have taken part in liberation movements outside of South Africa, been part of constitution drafting and become international leaders and advocates. The Centre for Human Rights is fairly new and so is still gaining experience and knowledge of the proper way to get policies and government set up as well as international support. When most people think of non-governmental institutions, the Red Cross would come to mind. It seems like a monumental institution that was built out of hard times, during the apartheid and helped to end it and draft a constitution and come out to be a rather extraordinary group of people that have been a great asset to Africa. In 2006, the Centre for Human Rights received the UNESCO prize for Human Rights specifically for their democratisation in Africa and the Africa Human Rights Moot Court, which is a huge honour and shows that the international relations community is aware of them. In 2012, the centre was awarded the 2012 African Union Human Rights Prize, in recognition of their contribution to the work of the African Commission on Human and Peoples' Rights in the promotion and protection of human rights in Africa.

== Human Rights Education Projects ==
- The Advanced Human Rights Courses – series of one-week intensive and advanced short courses covering aspects of human rights
- The African Human Rights Moot Court Competition is an international moot court competition with a special focus on human rights in Africa. The competition is organised by the Centre for Human Rights. Annually, the competition is hosted by a Law Faculty from a different African country. Since its inception in 1992, the competition has had 845 participant teams originating from 125 universities from 45 African countries.
- The Annual African Trade Moot Competition part of the LLM in International Trade and Investment Law in Africa programme. The competition is presented annually alternating between the University of Pretoria and the University of the Western Cape.

== Current and former staff ==
- Frans Jacobus Viljoen is a director, Centre for Human Rights, Faculty of Law, University of Pretoria, South Africa.
- Johann van der Westhuizen is a judge in the Constitutional Court of South Africa. He was appointed to the bench in 2004 by Thabo Mbeki. He was previously a professor at the University of Pretoria Faculty of Law and the founding director of the Centre for Human Rights. He currently sits on the board of the Centre for Human Rights and the University of Pretoria Council.
- Johann Kriegler is a former Constitutional Court and Appeal Court judge from South Africa. He is currently a board member of the University of South Africa Law Faculty, board member of the University of Pretoria Centre for Human Rights.
- Yvonne Mokgoro is a judge in the Constitutional Court of South Africa. She was appointed to the bench in 1994 by Nelson Mandela. She is a board member of the Centre for Human Rights.
- Kader Asmal was a South African politician. He was a professor of human rights at the University of the Western Cape, chairman of the council of the University of the North and vice-president of the African Association of International Law. He was a board member of the Centre for Human Rights.
- Christof Heyns – Former Director (1999–2006) of the Centre for Human Rights is a professor of human rights law, co-director of the Institute for International and Comparative Law in Africa at the University of Pretoria and United Nations Special Rapporteur on extrajudicial, summary or arbitrary executions.
- Dire Tladi – Principal State Law Adviser for International Law for the South African Department of International Relations and Cooperation and South Africa Mission to the United Nations. Member of the United Nations International Law Commission.

== Publications ==
- African Human Rights Law Journal publishes peer-reviewed contributions dealing with human rights related topics of relevance to Africa, Africans, and scholars of Africa. The journal appears twice a year, in March and October.
- African Human Rights Law Reports is an annual law journal published by JUTA Law on behalf of the Centre for Human Rights. It contains legal decisions of relevance to human rights law in Africa.

== See also ==
- African Human Rights Moot Court Competition
- World Human Rights Moot Court Competition
