= Martha Mbhele =

South African judge (born 1973)

The Honourable Martha Mbhele

Deputy Judge President of the Free State High Court
- Incumbent
- Assumed office 1 July 2021
- Appointed by: Cyril Ramaphosa
- President: Cagney Musi
- Preceded by: Cagney Musi

Judge of the High Court
- Incumbent
- Assumed office 1 January 2016
- Appointed by: Jacob Zuma
- Division: Free State Division

Personal details
- Born: 3 September 1973 (age 53) Lindley, Orange Free State; South Africa
- Education: University of the North

Nobulawo Martha Mbhele (born 3 September 1973) is a South African judge who is currently serving as Deputy Judge President of the Free State High Court. She was appointed to the court as a puisne judge in January 2016 and was elevated to the deputy judge presidency in July 2021. Before she joined the bench, she was an attorney in the Free State, both in private practice and for a decade at Legal Aid South Africa.

== Early life and education ==
Mbhele was born on 3 September 1973 in Lindley in the former Orange Free State (now the Free State). She attended primarily school on the farm where her parents worked, though she matriculated at Kgola-Thuto High School in Phuthaditjhaba.

When she enrolled at the University of the North, her father's employer on the farm paid her registration fees, and one of her two policemen brothers covered her tuition. While completing her BProc in Turfloop, she became active in the Christian Students Movement and Pan Africanist Student Movement of Azania.

== Legal career ==
After her graduation, Mbhele was a candidate attorney between 1996 and 2000, moving from Kubushi Molemela Attorneys (the firm of Mahube Molemela and Elizabeth Kubushi) to TP Mosese Attorneys in 1998. She was admitted as an attorney on 8 March 2001, towards the end of a year-long stint as the coordinator of the Thusanang Advice Centre in Phuthaditjhaba. In April 2001, she entered practice with ten months as an attorney at Peete Mosese Incorporated, where she primarily handled commercial law, labour law, and family law matters. She was also a part-time lecturer at the Free State Technikon from 1999 to 2002.

For a decade between 2002 and 2012, Mbhele worked at Legal Aid South Africa. She joined the organisation as an associate attorney in Phuthaditjhaba in February 2002; was promoted to supervisory associate in April 2005; and then moved to Welkom at the end of 2005 to become an executive in the organisation's Justice Centre, where her main practice areas were labour law, criminal law, family law, and land matters. In 2009, she became one of Legal Aid's regional operations executive (first for the Limpopo and Mpumalanga region, and then for the Free State and North West region).

In August 2012, she left Legal Aid to become a director at Mhlambi Incorporated, entering into partnership with Joseph Mhlambi. While at the firm, Mbhele was also a member of the Free State Operating Licensing Board, and, in 2015, the deputy chairperson of Matjhabeng Local Municipality's planning tribunal. She was an acting judge in the Free State Division of the High Court of South Africa for several months cumulatively between 2014 and 2015.

Throughout her legal career, Mbhele was an active member of the Black Lawyers Association, which she joined as a candidate attorney in 1996. She rose through the ranks of the organisation, serving two terms as the chairperson of its Free State branch from 2006 to 2010 and one term as the organisation's national treasurer from 2011 to 2013. She was a member of the African National Congress until her appointment to the bench.

== Free State High Court: 2016–present ==
In October 2015, Mbhele was one of seven candidates whom the Judicial Service Commission shortlisted and interviewed for possible permanent appointment to two judicial vacancies in the Free State Division. During her interview, she defended herself against the Free State Bar's complaint that she had only four years' experience in court, arguing that she had been attending court and handling court cases throughout her 19-year career. After its hearings, the Judicial Service Commission recommended Mbhele and Celeste Reinders for appointment, and President Jacob Zuma confirmed their nominations with effect from 1 January 2016.

While serving in the High Court, Mbhele was an acting judge in the High Court of Lesotho in April 2016 and an acting judge in the Supreme Court of Appeal of South Africa from 1 December 2023 to 31 March 2024. In addition, she joined the South African chapter of the International Association of Women Judges in 2016, and she was the coordinator of its Free State provincial branch from 2021 to 2023.

=== Deputy judge presidency ===
After Cagney Musi vacated the Free State Division's deputy judge presidency to become Judge President, Mbhele was acting Deputy Judge President for three three-month terms in 2020 and early 2021. In February 2021, the Judicial Service Commission announced that she was one of three candidates shortlisted for permanent appointment as Deputy Judge President; the others were Judges Johannes Daffue and Somaganthie Naidoo, both senior to Mbhele on the bench. Daffue told the commission that Mbhele was "still young" and that "her time will come", but, during her own interview, Mbhele objected to this attitude, saying, "I can do this job, and I am capable."

The Judicial Service Commission recommended her for the position and President Cyril Ramaphosa confirmed her appointment with effect from 1 July 2021. She stood in for Musi as acting Judge President from January to September 2022 and from October to November 2023.

== Personal life ==
Mbhele has two children.
