= University of Pretoria Faculty of Law =

Law faculty at University of Pretoria

- Former name: Transvaal University College (1908–1930)
- Type: Public; Law school
- Established: 1908
- Affiliations: University of Pretoria
- Dean: Elsabe Schoeman
- Location: (South Africa) Pretoria, Gauteng, South Africa
- Campus: Hatfield
Colours
Blue, Gold and Red
- Nickname: Tuks or Tukkies
- Website: Faculty of Law

The University of Pretoria Faculty of Law was established in 1908. It consists of six academic departments, six centres, two law clinics and the Pretoria University Law Press (PULP). This faculty has Departments of Jurisprudence, Mercantile Law, Private Law, Procedural Law, Public Law and Centre for Human Rights. The faculty offers the undergraduate LLB degree, and postgraduate LLM/MPhil and LLD/PhD degrees.

The Oliver R Tambo Law Library houses the faculty's collection of legal materials and the Law of Africa collection.

The faculty organises the annual African and World Human Rights Moot Court Competitions. In 2006, the faculty's Centre for Human Rights received the UNESCO Prize for Human Rights Education. Since 1997, the university has produced more research output every year than any other institution in South Africa, as measured by the Department of Education's accreditation benchmark.

== History ==
The proposal for a university for the capital, first mooted in the Volksraad in 1889, was interrupted by the outbreak of the Anglo Boer War in 1899. In 1902, after the signing of the Peace of Vereeniging, the Normal College for teacher training was established in Groenkloof, Pretoria, and in 1904, the Transvaal Technical Institute, with an emphasis on mining education, opened in Johannesburg. In 1906, the Transvaal Technical Institute changed its name to the Transvaal University College (TUC). On 4 March 1908, when Transvaal University College (TUC) transferred its arts and science courses to its newly established Pretoria Campus, the precursor to the university was established, initially offering courses in languages, sciences, and law.

In November 2019, Elsabe Schoeman became Dean of UP Law. Since August 2020, the Deputy Dean for Teaching and Learning has been Professor Charles Maimela, the youngest and first black Deputy Dean at UP Law.

UP Law currently employs approximately 70 dedicated full-time academics.

== Global ranking ==
UP Law achieved a global 78th-placed ranking in 2023 and 60th in 2022, making it the highest ranked Faculty of Law on the African continent.

The faculty conferred 179 masters' and 35 doctoral graduates in 2017, 173 master's and 27 doctoral graduates in 2018, and 18 doctoral and 246 master's degrees in 2019.

University of Pretoria Faculty of Law building

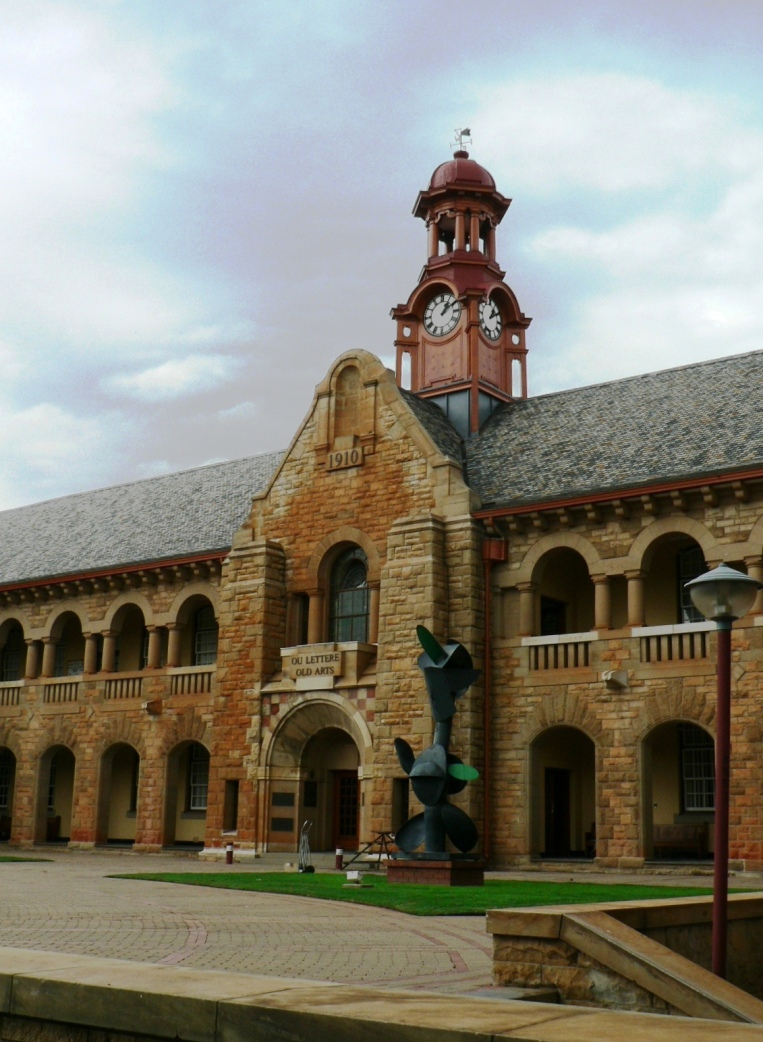
The University of Pretoria Old Arts building

== Centres and institutes ==
Centres and institutes in the faculty include the Centre for Advanced Corporate & Insolvency Law, Centre for Child Law, Centre for Human Rights, Centre for Intellectual Property Law, Centre for Medicine & Law, Institute for International and Comparative Law in Africa and Sports Law Centre in Africa.

=== Centre for Human Rights ===
The Centre for Human Rights at the University of Pretoria, South Africa, founded in 1986, is an organisation promoting human rights on the continent of Africa through educational outreach, including multinational conferences, seminars and publications such as Human Rights Law in Africa, the African Human Rights Law Journal, the African Human Rights Law Reports and The Constitutional Law of South Africa. The centre, which was founded during Apartheid, helped adapt a Bill of Rights for South Africa and contributed to creating the South African Constitution. In 2006, the centre received the UNESCO Prize for Human Rights Education.

=== Institute for International and Comparative Law in Africa ===
The Institute for International and Comparative Law in Africa (ICLA), established at the beginning of 2011, is a research institute in the Faculty of Law with Professors Erika de Wet and Christof Heyns (the United Nations Special Rapporteur for extrajudicial, summary or arbitrary executions) being appointed as co-directors.

The ICLA coordinates the Oxford Constitutions Online African country reports and collaborates with the Centre for Human Rights to coordinate the Oxford Reports on International Law in Domestic Courts (ILDC) Online African case law.

=== Centre for Child Law ===
The Centre for Child Law (CCL/ Centre) was established in 1998 and is registered as a law clinic with the Legal Practice Council. CCL contributes to the establishment and protection of children’s rights through strategic impact litigation, participation in legislative and policy reform, advocacy, research, capacity building of relevant stakeholders, and contributing to the body of knowledge on child law. As a leading children’s rights strategic impact litigation organisation in South Africa, the Centre has contributed to the development of child law through law reform, case law, policy development, and influencing public discourse through the use of the constitutional, regional, and international legal framework for effective public interest litigation.

The vision of the Centre is to establish child law and uphold the rights of children in South Africa within an international and regional context, particularly insofar as these interests pertain to their legal position. The Centre’s mission is to work towards the development of child law and the realisation of children’s rights in South Africa, within a regional and international context. It works toward ensuring the accountability of responsible role players, both public and private, for the protection and realisation of children’s rights as required by international and national legal instruments such as the Convention on the Rights of the Child, the African Charter on the Rights and Welfare of the Child, the Constitution of the Republic of South Africa, and other relevant child rights and human rights treaties.

To realise its mission and vision, the Centre strategically engages in various activities. Over the years, the Centre has worked on diversifying its areas of activity beyond litigation with the view of ensuring that its work remains relevant, impactful, and engaging as the children’s rights legal framework develops. Below is a detailed discussion of some of these areas of work. Its current thematic areas of work include strategic litigation, legal advice and assistance, advocacy and policy reform, research and evidence-based advocacy, stakeholder collaboration, engagement and networking, and capacity building.

The Centre's strategic litigation approach includes initiating impact litigation matters and intervening as amicus curiae in litigation concerning children's rights by appearing in several cases before the High Court of South Africa, Supreme Court of Appeal and Constitutional Court.

To affirm and give content to children’s rights, the Centre carefully selects cases to set a legal precedent that improves and strengthens laws pertaining to children, in line with the Constitution, regional and international rights, and principles. The Centre employs numerous litigation strategies, including entering as amicus curiae in strategic cases and bringing its own applications, civil actions, and appeals or reviews. The Centre plays a strategic role in a network of child protection organisations and accepts referrals from other children's rights groups.

There are eight strategic thematic areas of focus, including environmental justice, birth registration, migrant children, education, children with disabilities, care and protection, children in the criminal justice system, and social assistance.

== Moot court competitions ==
Moot court	Institution	Founded	Location
African Human Rights Moot Court Competition	Organised by the University of Pretoria Faculty of Law	1992	Held at participating law schools in the African continent
South African National Schools Moot Court Competition	Organised annually by a different grouping of law schools	2011	National oral rounds take place at the University of Pretoria Faculty of Law, Pretoria and the finals at the Constitutional Court in Johannesburg
World Human Rights Moot Court Competition	Organised by the University of Pretoria Faculty of Law	2009	Pretoria
African Trade Moot	Organised by the University of Pretoria Faculty of Law, University of the Western Cape		Pretoria and Cape Town
Manfred Lachs Space Law Moot Court Competition	Organised by the International Institute of Space Law		The Africa Regional Round is hosted by the Institute for International and Comparative Law in Africa, University of Pretoria Faculty of Law

== Pretoria University Law Press ==
The Pretoria University Law Press (PULP), within the Faculty of Law, publishes and distributes scholarly legal texts in English, Afrikaans, French, Arabic and Portuguese. PULP publishes a series of collections of legal documents related to African public law and legal textbooks from other African countries and is a member of the Publishers' association of South Africa.

== Student activities ==
Law students participate in the following activities:

- The Constitutional Tribunal is the judicial body of student governance and adjudicates disputes primarily between student organisations, and its judges sit on the panel of student disciplinary hearings.
- The Pretoria Student Law Review (PSLR), published by PULP, is a student-driven and administered initiative providing an interactive student platform to discuss topical legal matters.
- Law House provides a platform for social engagement, community outreach and student engagement with the faculty.
- Several internal and external moot court competitions through the Moot and Debating Society.
- The Student Disciplinary Advisory Panel (SDAP) may give advice to students appearing in front of student disciplinary hearings regarding the procedure of student disciplinary hearings.

== Alumni ==
Well-known alumni include:

=== Politicians ===
- Pik Botha, Minister of Foreign Affairs and later Minister of Mineral and Energy Affairs
- Ronald Lamola, Minister of Justice and Correctional Services (since May 2019)
- Nelson Mandela, President of South Africa (1994–1999), Honorary Doctorate
- Andries Nel, Deputy Minister of Justice and Correctional Services and now Deputy Minister of Justice and Constitutional Development
- J. G. Strijdom, Prime Minister of South Africa (1954–1958)

=== Justices/Judges ===
- W. G. Boshoff, former Transvaal Judge President
- Frikkie Eloff, former Transvaal Judge President
- Brian Galgut, retired Deputy Judge President, KwaZulu-Natal High Court
- Louis Harms, retired Deputy President of the Supreme Court of Appeal
- Mabel Jansen, former Judge of the Gauteng High Court
- Johann Kriegler, retired Justice of the Constitutional Court of South Africa (1994–2002)
- Frans Lourens Herman Rumpff, Chief Justice of South Africa (1972–1982)
- Dikgang Moseneke, retired Deputy Chief Justice of South Africa (2005–2016), honorary doctorate
- Piet Streicher, retired Judge of the Supreme Court of Appeal
- Johann van der Westhuizen, Judge of the Constitutional Court of South Africa

=== Other ===
- George Bizos, honorary doctorate (died 9 September 2020)
- Christof Heyns, former Director (1999–2006) of the Centre for Human Rights (died 28 March 2021)
- Dire Tladi, Principal State Law Adviser for International Law for the South African Department of International Relations and Cooperation and South Africa Mission to the United Nations
- Anna-Marie de Vos
- Wim Trengove
- Leonora van den Heever

== See also ==
- South African National Schools Moot Court Competition
- African Human Rights Moot Court Competition
- World Human Rights Moot Court Competition
- African Human Rights Law Journal
- African Human Rights Law Reports
