= George Sutton (judge) =

South African judge

The Honourable George Sutton KC

Judge President of the Cape Provincial Division
- In office 1946–1948
- Preceded by: Percy Twentyman-Jones
- Succeeded by: Reginald P. B. Davis

Judge of the Cape Provincial Division of the Supreme Court
- In office 1929–1946

Personal details
- Born: George Gerard Sutton; 17 June 1880 Swellendam, Cape Colony
- Died: 27 December 1955 (aged 75) Wynberg, Cape Town, Union of South Africa
- Education: Emmanuel College, Cambridge
- Profession: Advocate

George Gerard Sutton KC (17 June 1880 – 27 December 1955) was a South African judge and Judge President of the Cape Provincial Division of the Supreme Court.

== Early life ==
Sutton was born on the Farm, Klip River in the Swellendam district, the second son of the Reverend Joseph George Sutton and Catharina Benedicta Sutton (née Reitz). The Rev Sutton became the headmaster of Dale College in June 1890. George was educated at Dale College and also at the Manchester Grammar School. He then continued as a Scholar of Emmanuel College, Cambridge, and achieved a double first in the Law Tripos.

== Career ==
After graduating in 1903, he was called to the Middle Temple, London in June 1903. Later in 1903 he returned to South Africa and started practice at the Cape Bar in October. In 1921 he took silk and was appointed a puisne judge at the Cape Provincial Division in February 1929. From September 1946 until he retired in May 1948, he was Judge-President of the Cape.

== Personal life ==
Sutton married Agnes Gertrude Watermeyer on 29 December 1909 in Cape Town. Agnes was the sister of Ernest Frederick Watermeyer, who was Chief Justice of South Africa. George and Agnes had five children, three daughters and two sons.
