= Cagney Musi =

South African judge

The Honourable Cagney Musi

Judge President of the Free State High Court
- Incumbent
- Assumed office 1 December 2018
- Appointed by: Cyril Ramaphosa
- Deputy: Martha Mbhele
- Preceded by: Mahube Molemela

Deputy Judge President of the Free State High Court
- In office January 2017 – 30 November 2018
- Appointed by: Jacob Zuma
- President: Mahube Molemela
- Succeeded by: Martha Mbhele

Judge of the High Court
- Incumbent
- Assumed office 1 June 2005
- Appointed by: Thabo Mbeki
- Division: Free State Division

Personal details
- Born: Cagney John Musi; 17 November 1962 (age 63) Springs, Transvaal; South Africa
- Education: University of the Western Cape; University of Cape Town

Cagney John Musi (born 17 November 1962) is a South African judge who is currently serving as Judge President of the Free State High Court. He was appointed to the court as a puisne judge in June 2005 and was elevated to the judge presidency in December 2018 after two years' service as Deputy Judge President. Before joining the bench, he was a public prosecutor from 1986 to 1992 and a magistrate from 1992 to 2004.

Musi was an acting judge in the Constitutional Court in 2016, and he was president of the African chapter of the International Association of Judges between 2010 and 2018. He also served a term as chairperson of the Independent Commission for the Remuneration of Public Office Bearers between 2014 and 2019.

== Early life and education ==
Musi was born on 17 November 1962 in Springs in the former Transvaal Province. He was classified as Coloured under apartheid, and he attended the University of the Western Cape, where he completed a Dipl-Juris in 1985, a BA in law in 1988, an LLB in 1991, and an Hons in public administration in 1993. Later, in 1995, he completed an LLM at the University of Cape Town.

== Career in the magistrate's court ==
From 1986 to 1992, while studying at the University of the Western Cape, Musi worked as a public prosecutor. Thereafter, from 1992 to 2004, he was a magistrate; he was a district magistrate, presiding in criminal, family and civil matters, until 1997, when he was promoted to regional magistrate. During that period, in 2001, he was admitted as an attorney of the High Court of South Africa. He was also active in the Magistrates' Association of South Africa and in the Judicial Officers' Association of South Africa; he served as the national president of the latter group between 2002 and 2004.

In 2004, Musi left the magistracy to enter a training programme for aspirant judges. Thereafter he served three terms as an acting judge in the Northern Cape Division of the High Court, based in Kimberley, before he was appointed permanently as a judge in 2005.

== Free State High Court: 2005–present ==
On 31 May 2005, President Thabo Mbeki announced that Musi would join the High Court permanently as a judge of the Free State Division. He took office on 1 June 2005. Among other matters, Musi presided in the Brendin Horner murder trial, which received extensive public attention as a so-called farm murder.

=== Labour Appeal Court ===
Musi was an acting judge in the Labour Court in 2008 and 2009 and an acting judge in the Labour Appeal Court in 2013. In that capacity, in the Labour Court in 2008, he ruled against Sibongile Manana, Mpumalanga's provincial health minister, in an unfair dismissal case; Malcolm Naude had been fired from his position at a Nelspruit hospital for prescribing antiretrovirals to rape victims at a time when doing so was against provincial health policy.

In April 2014, Musi was among six candidates whom the Judicial Service Commission shortlisted and interviewed for possible permanent appointment to the Labour Appeal Court. He was recommended for appointment, and, the following month, President Jacob Zuma confirmed his appointment to a ten-year term, with effect from 1 June 2014.

=== Judge Presidency ===
In October 2016, the Judicial Service Commission recommended Musi for appointment as Deputy Judge President of the Free State Division. Judge Khalipi Moloi had also been shortlisted for the position, but he had dropped out of the contest, leaving Musi as the only candidate. He took office as Deputy Judge President in January 2017.

At that time, Musi had already served as acting Judge President for brief periods in 2015 and 2016, and in subsequent years, he filled the role on several occasions, filling in for Judge President Mahube Molemela between January and September 2017 and then, after Molemela was elevated to the Supreme Court of Appeal, between June and November 2018. During the latter period, in August 2018, Musi was the sole candidate whom the Judicial Service Commission shortlisted for possible appointment to succeed Molemela permanently.

He was viewed as "an apparent shoo-in" given that he had been given the "unofficial 'stamp of approval'" by, and even "groomed" for succession by, Molemela. His interview, held in October 2018, proceeded smoothly, and the Judicial Service Commission recommended him for the appointment. He took office as Judge President on 1 December 2018.

=== Other courts ===
In addition to his service in the Labour Court, Musi has been seconded as an acting judge to several other courts. Between 2010 and 2012, he was an acting judge on several occasions in the Lesotho High Court and Lesotho Labour Appeal Court, and on one occasion in the Lesotho Commercial Court. In the Lesotho High Court, he presided in the liquidation of companies belonging to Simon Thebe-ea-Khale; six Lesotho judges had recused themselves due to conflicts of interest arising from Thebe-ea-Khale's alleged pyramid scheme. In South Africa, he acted in the Constitutional Court of South Africa between August and December 2016, appointed by President Zuma to fill in for retired justice Johann van der Westhuizen. After that, he served twice as an acting judge in the Supreme Court of Appeal, first between December 2021 and May 2022 and then between October and November 2023.

== Other activities ==
In October 2014, President Zuma appointed Musi to succeed Willie Seriti as chairperson of the Independent Commission for the Remuneration of Public Office Bearers. He served a full five-year term in that office.

Musi was also a member of the three-member judicial conduct tribunal appointed by the Judicial Service Commission to investigate allegations of misconduct by John Hlophe, the Western Cape Judge President. However, shortly before the tribunal was scheduled to begin, Hlophe asked Musi to recuse himself from the hearing, on the basis that he had made "disparaging remarks" about Hlophe while talking to other judges at a social gathering in 2017. According to Musi, Hlophe made the same request for recusal by telephone, as well as in writing. When the tribunal met on 2 July 2018, Musi recused himself from further proceedings.

Musi is an active member in the International Association of Judges; from 2010 to 2018, he served as president of its Africa region and a vice-president of the global organisation. He has been a member of the advisory board of the Free State Centre for Human Rights since October 2018.
