= Jackie de Villiers =

South African judge

The Honourable Jackie de Villiers KC

Judge President of the Cape Provincial Division
- In office 1949–1959
- Preceded by: Reginald Davis
- Succeeded by: Andrew Beyers

Judge of the Cape Provincial Division of the Supreme Court
- In office 1939–1949

Personal details
- Born: Jean Etienne de Villiers; 28 June 1894 Somerset East, Cape Colony
- Died: 7 June 1960 (aged 65) Durban, Union of South Africa
- Education: University of Oxford
- Profession: Advocate

Jean Etienne de Villiers KC (28 June 1894 – 7 June 1960) known as "Jackie", was a South African judge and Judge President of the Cape Provincial Division of the Supreme Court.

== Early life ==
De Villiers was born in Somerset East, the son of Jan Stephanus de Villiers, the founder the Cape Town firm of attorneys, Jan S. de Villiers and Maria Isabella Hofmeyr. He attended the South African College Schools where in 1910, he was placed in the matriculation honours list. In 1914 he went as a Rhodes Scholar to Oxford.

During the First World War he took part in the South-West Africa and East African campaigns. After the war he acted as Judge A. W. Mason's registrar and then returned to Oxford in 1919, where he took an honours degree in jurisprudence and obtained the degrees of B.C.L. and M.A.

== Career ==
De Villiers joined the Cape Bar during August 1921 and he took silk in November 1935. He was appointed to the Cape Bench in 1939, appointed acting Judge President in 1947 and two years later became Judge President of the Cape Provincial Division. De Villiers presided over this court during the matter of Harris v Minister of the Interior, the constitutional struggle to place the Coloured voters on a separate voters' roll.

During his early years at the Bar he was a lecturer at the law school at the University of Cape Town and he co-authored with J. C. MacIntosh, the legal textbook, The law of agency in South Africa. In 1959, the University of Cape Town conferred an honorary LLD on him.
