= African Human Rights Moot Court Competition =

International moot court competition

One could hardly think of a better way to advance the cause of human rights than to bring together students - who are the leaders, judges and teachers of tomorrow - from different countries, with chief justices and professors, to debate some of the crucial issues of our time in the exciting and challenging atmosphere of a courtroom, where they can test their arguments and skills against one another in a spirit of fierce but friendly competition.

— Nelson Mandela,
Statesman, Nobel laureate and former president of the Republic of South Africa

The African Human Rights Moot Court Competition is an international moot court competition with a special focus on human rights in Africa. The competition is organised by the Centre for Human Rights, based at the University of Pretoria Faculty of Law in South Africa. Each year, the competition is hosted by a Law Faculty from a different African country. Since its inception in 1992, the competition has had 845 participant teams originating from 125 universities from 45 African countries.

The competition is tri-lingual and preliminary rounds are argued in English, French and Portuguese. Students argue a hypothetical human rights case and base their arguments on the African Charter on Human and Peoples' Rights. The final round is argued by two teams made up of the best three Anglophone teams, two Francophone teams and one Lusophone team. The final round is judged by prominent African and international jurists.

== Recognition ==
The African Human Rights Moot Court has been described as the largest gathering of law students and lecturers on the African continent. The Centre for Human Rights was awarded the UNESCO Prize for Human Rights Education in 2006 and the African Human Rights Moot Court received a special mention as it is one of the flagship programmes of the Centre.

== Historical overview ==
Year	Location	Winner	Runner-up
1992	Harare, Zimbabwe	University of Pretoria (South Africa)	University of Natal (South Africa)
1993	Lusaka, Zambia	University of Witwatersrand (South Africa)	University of Natal (South Africa)
1994	Kwaluseni, Swaziland	University of Natal (South Africa)	University of Cape Town (South Africa)
1995	Pretoria, South Africa	Rand Afrikaans University (South Africa) Makerere University (Uganda)	University of Pretoria (South Africa) University of Ghana (Ghana)
1996	Oujda, Morocco	University of Pretoria (South Africa) University of Nairobi (Kenya) Université Hassan II, Casablanca (Marocco)	University of Port Elizabeth (South Africa) University of Ghana (Ghana) Université de Côte d'Ivoire (Côte d'Ivoire)
1997	Kampala, Uganda	University of the Witwatersrand (South Africa) Makerere University (Uganda)	University of Pretoria (South Africa) Université du Bénin (Togo)
1998	Maputo, Mozambique	Universidade Eduardo Mondlane (Mozambique) University of Botswana (Botswana)	University of Cape Town (South Africa) Université du Bénin (Togo)
1999	Abidjan, Côte D'Ivoire	Université de Cocody (Côte D'Ivoire) University of Nairobi (Kenya)	University of the Witwatersrand (South Africa) Université de la Réunion (Togo)
2000	Accra, Ghana	Université Catholique d'Afrique Centrale (Cameroon) University of Ghana (Ghana)	University of the Witwatersrand (South Africa) Université du Caire (Egypt)
2001	Pretoria, South Africa	Université Tunis III (Tunisia) Makerere University (Uganda)	University of Pretoria (South Africa) Université Bouake (Togo)
2002	Cairo, Egypt from	University of Nairobi (Kenya) Universite de la Reunion (Reunion)	University of Pretoria (South Africa) Universite Mohamed (Morocco)
2003	Yaounde, Cameroon	University of Cocody (Côte D'Ivoire) University of Natal (South Africa)	University of Nairobi (Kenya) University of Dschang(Cameroon)
2004	Dar es Salaam, Tanzania	Université Abomey Calavi (Bénin) University of Pretoria (South Africa)	Université Marien Ngouabi (Congo) University of Nairobi(Kenya)
2005	Johannesburg, South Africa	University of Cocody (Côte D'Ivoire) University of Cape Town (South Africa)	American University of Cairo (Egypt) Université Mohammed Ier(Morocco)
2006	Addis Ababa, Ethiopia	Gaston Berger University (Senegal) University of the Witwatersrand (South Africa)	University of Malawi (Malawi) Université du Caire(Egypt)
2007	Dakar, Senegal	University of the Free State (South Africa) Université Libre de Kinshasa (Democratic Republic of the Congo)	University of Ilorin (Nigeria) Université Catholique de l'Afrique de l'Ouest(Côte d'Ivoire)
2008	Pretoria, South Africa	University of Pretoria (South Africa) University of Ghana (Côte D'Ivoire) Eduardo Mondlane University (Mozambique)	Université Gaston Berger de Saint-Louis (Senegal) Université Mohammed Premier(Morocco) University of Lagos(Nigeria)
2009	Lagos, Nigeria	University of Ghana (Ghana) Université de Dschang (Cameroun) Universidade Eduardo Mondlane (Mozambique)	University of Cape Town (South Africa) Université Gaston Berger de Saint-Louis (Senegal) Universidade Zambeze (Mozambique)
2010	Cotonou, Benin	Université de Cocody (Cote D'Ivoire) University of Namibia (Namibia) Rhodes University (South Africa)	Universite d'Abomey-Calavi (Benin) Kwame Nkrumah University of Science and Technology (Ghana) University of Lagos (Nigeria)
2011	Pretoria, South Africa	University of Pretoria (South Africa) Université de Cocody (Cote D'Ivoire) Universidade Eduardo Mondlane (Mozambique)	University of Cape Town (South Africa) Universite Gaston Berger de Saint-Louis Agostinho Neto University

== See also ==
- Moot court
- Centre for Human Rights
- World Human Rights Moot Court Competition
- South African National Schools Moot Court Competition
