= Licence de droit =

The Licence en droit is the French national diploma for undergraduate legal education. Universities in France award it after three years of study. The Licence allows its holders to give legal advice.

== History ==
Until 1976, undergraduate law education in France was a four-year terminal degree. It is now a three-year degree.

== Further education ==
Licence en droit holders can pursue further education in a set list of master's degrees, fixed by the code de l'éducation. The list includes all master's degrees in the field of law, as well as other related fields.

== See also ==
- Bachelor of Laws
