= Gerald Friedman (judge) =

South African judge (1928–2023)

The Honourable Gerald Friedman SC

Judge President of the Cape Provincial Division
- In office 1992–1998
- Preceded by: George Munnik
- Succeeded by: Edwin King

Judge of the Appellate Division
- In office 1990–1991

Judge of the Cape Provincial Division of the Supreme Court
- In office 1977–1990

Personal details
- Born: 13 September 1928
- Died: 11 September 2023 (aged 94)
- Education: University of Cape Town
- Profession: Advocate

Gerald Friedman SC (13 September 1928 – 11 September 2023) was a South African judge who was Judge President of the Cape Provincial Division of the Supreme Court.

== Early life and education ==
Friedman studied at the University of Cape Town and obtained the degrees of BA and LLB.

== Career ==
In 1950, Friedman was admitted to the Cape Bar and twenty year later, in 1970 he took silk. In 1977, he was appointed a judge at the Cape Provincial Division of the Supreme Court and in 1990, he was promoted to Judge of Appeal. In 1992 re-joined the Cape Division of the Supreme Court, becoming the Judge President of the Cape, a post he had held until 1998.

From 1999 until 2010, Friedman acted as the chairperson of the Financial Services Appeal Board and from 1999 until 2007, also as chair of the Ombudsman's Council.

== Notable cases ==
Friedman was the presiding judge in the murder trial of the accused for the murder of the American student, Amy Biehl, during 1993. He convicted the accused and sentenced them to 18 years in prison.

== Death ==
Friedman died on 11 September 2023, two days before his 95th birthday.
