= African Human Rights Law Reports =

- Discipline: Human rights law
- Language: English, French
- Edited by: Frans Viljoen and Magnus Killander

Publication details
- History: 2001-present
- Publisher: JUTA Law on behalf of the Centre for Human Rights (University of Pretoria) (South Africa)
- Frequency: Annually
- Open access: Yes

Standard abbreviations
- ISO 4: Afr. Hum. Rights Law Rep.

Indexing
- ISSN: 1812-2418
- OCLC no.: 63788369

Links
- Journal homepage; Online access

The African Human Rights Law Reports is an annual law journal published by JUTA Law on behalf of the Centre for Human Rights at the University of Pretoria. It contains legal decisions of relevance to human rights law in Africa. These include selected domestic decisions from the whole continent, as well as the decisions of the African Commission on Human and Peoples' Rights and the United Nations treaty bodies, dealing with African countries. It is published in English and French and is indexed in the International Bibliography of the Social Sciences. It was previously edited by Christof Heyns.
