= Acta Juridica =

Law journal

Acta Juridica is a generalist law journal based at the University of Cape Town and published by Juta & Co Ltd. It was founded in 1958 as the successor to the Butterworths South African Law Review, whose four annual issues had included writing by, among others, A v. d. S. Centlivres, Lord Denning, H. L. A. Hart, Tony Honoré, G. W. Keeton, Peter Stein, and Leonard Thompson. The journal's first editors were Ben Beinart and T. W. Price, who envisaged that it would provide lengthier and more scholarly discussion of legal issues than was afforded in the South African law quarterlies of the time.
