= Hendrik Stephanus van Zyl =

South African judge

The Honourable Hendrik Stephanus van Zyl KC

Judge President of the Cape Provincial Division
- In office 1935–1946
- Preceded by: Fritz Gardiner
- Succeeded by: Percy Twentyman-Jones

Judge of the Cape Provincial Division of the Supreme Court
- In office 1920–1935

Personal details
- Born: Hendrik Stephanus van Zyl; 27 January 1876 Clanwilliam, Cape Colony
- Died: 26 October 1955 (aged 79) Cape Town, Union of South Africa
- Education: St John's College, Cambridge

Hendrik Stephanus van Zyl KC (27 January 1876 – 26 October 1955) was a South African judge and politician.

== Early life ==
Van Zyl was born on the farm Hexrivier in the Clanwilliam district, the son and youngest child of Paulus Hendrik Stephanus van Zyl and his second wife Maria Christina Visser, for whom it was also a second marriage. He first started school at the age of nine and made rapid progress. In June 1892 he enrolled at Victoria College, Stellenbosch and two years later he obtained seventh place in the first class in the Matriculation examination. He then earned a B.A. degree from the University of the Cape of Good Hope. To further his studies, he went to England in 1898 and entered St John's College, Cambridge, where he became involved in political debate and in 1901 was elected the president of the Cambridge Union.

== Career ==
Van Zyl obtained his LLB degree 1902, after which he returned to South Africa where he passed the final law examination at the University of the Cape of Good Hope. He was admitted to the Cape Bar in February 1903. He then went into politics and in 1905 was elected as a member of the House of Assembly for Paarl; in 1908 he became the member for Namaqualand.

After South Africa became a Union in 1910, Van Zyl began spending more time on his advocacy practice and in 1919 he took silk. The following year he was appointed a puisne judge at the Cape Provincial Division. After fifteen years on the Cape Bench, he was appointed the Judge President in 1935 and held the post for eleven years until he reached the compulsory retirement age of seventy in 1946.

== Personal life ==
Van Zyl was involved in various other cultural and community organisations and was the chairman of the Historical Monuments Commission from 1942 to 1954, the South African Public Library and from 1933 to 1950 he served as vice-chancellor of the University of Stellenbosch.

Van Zyl married Dorothy Constantia Sauer on 7 September 1907 and four children were born of the marriage. Their eldest son, Jacobus Wilhelmus (Helm) van Zyl, also became a judge of the Cape Provincial Division and later the Judge President.
