= Nicola Peart =

New Zealand law academic and professor

Nicola Peart ONZM
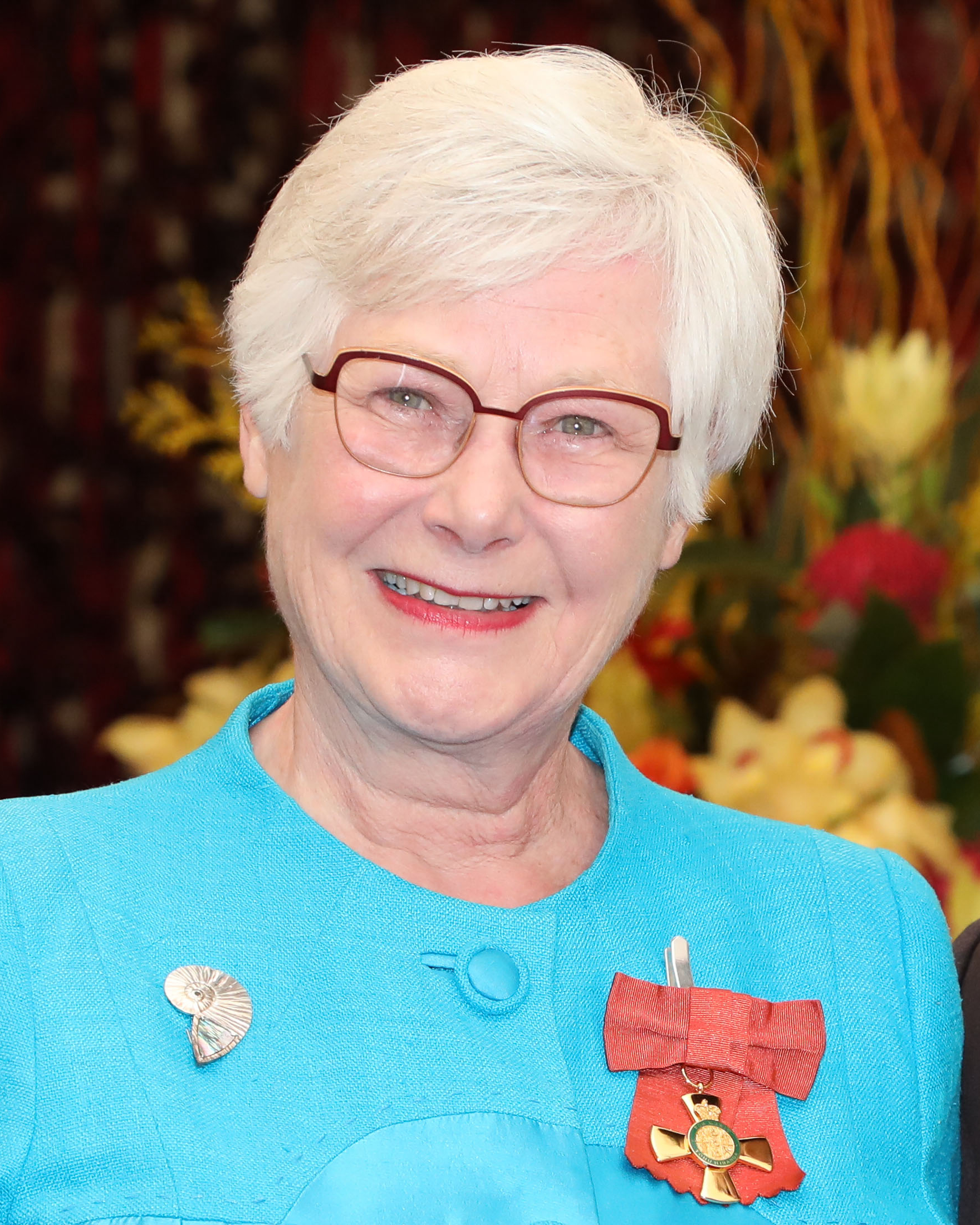
- Peart in 2024

Academic background
- Education: Leiden University, University of Cape Town

Academic work
- Discipline: Succession law; medical law
- Institutions: University of Cape Town, University of Otago

Nicola Sheila Peart ONZM is a New Zealand law academic, and as of 2019 is a full professor at the University of Otago.

== Academic career ==
After degrees from Leiden University and University of Cape Town, Peart moved to the University of Otago, rising to full professor. Peart is a recognised expert on succession law.

In the 2024 King’s Birthday Honours, Peart was appointed an Officer of the New Zealand Order of Merit, for services to the law.

== Selected works ==
- Chan, Tracey E., Nicola S. Peart, and Jacqueline Chin. "Evolving legal responses to dependence on families in New Zealand and Singapore healthcare." Journal of medical ethics 40, no. 12 (2014): 861–865.
- Peart, Nicola S., Alastair V. Campbell, ALEX R. Manara, Shelley A. Renowden, and Gordon M. Stirrat. "Maintaining a pregnancy following loss of capacity." Medical law review 8, no. 3 (2000): 275–299.
- Bennett, Thomas W., and Nicola S. Peart. "The dualism of marriage laws in Africa." Acta Juridica (1983): 145.
- Peart, Nicola, and David Holdaway. "Legal and ethical issues of health research with children." Childrenz Issues: Journal of the Children's Issues Centre 2, no. 2 (1998): 42.
