= Reginald Davis (judge) =

South African judge

The Honourable Reginald Davis KC

Judge President of the Cape Provincial Division
- In office 1948–1948
- Preceded by: George Sutton
- Succeeded by: J. E. de Villiers

Judge of the Cape Provincial Division of the Supreme Court
- In office 1935–1948

Personal details
- Born: Reginald Percy Basil Davis; 14 December 1881 London, England
- Died: 6 December 1948 (aged 66) St James, Cape Town, Union of South Africa
- Education: New College, Oxford
- Profession: Advocate

Reginald Percy Basil Davis KC (14 December 1881 – 6 December 1948) was a South African judge and Judge President of the Cape Provincial Division of the Supreme Court.

== Early life and education ==
Born in London, Davis moved with family to the Cape Colony at a young age and the family settled in Kimberley. He received his schooling at the Diocesan College School from 1892 until 1894 and in 1895 went to Harrow in London, England.

In 1900 he returned to Cape Town and began working as an articled clerk, when he was persuaded to take the matriculation examination. He achieved first place in the Cape Colony in the examination, after which he decided to become an advocate. In 1901 he then gained second place in the intermediate examination and in 1903 he obtained an honours B.A. in Classical Languages and won the Porter Scholarship.

Davis entered New College, Oxford in 1904 and the following month became a member of the Inner Temple in London. In June 1907 he obtained an honours B.A. in jurisprudence, after which he took the bar examination at the Inns of Court.

== Career ==
At the beginning of 1908, Davis was admitted to the bar as a member of the Inner Temple. He returned to South Africa shortly afterwards and in February 1908 became an advocate of the Supreme Court of the Cape of Good Hope and a member of the Cape bar council. He took silk in 1924.

In October 1935 Davis was appointed a judge of the Cape Provincial Division and became an acting judge of appeal in 1944. He continued as an acting judge until 1947 and in 1948, he was appointed judge president of the Cape Provincial Division of the Supreme Court.

Simultaneously with his judicial career, Davis also lectured and was responsible for legal journals and the compilation of court reports. He was editor of the South African Law Journal from 1913 to 1922 and a lecturer in law at the South African College from 1914 to 1917 and at the University of Cape Town from 1918 to 1923. From 1924, Davis was general editor of the law reports published by Juta & Co. in Cape Town.
