= Egyptian Building (Cape Town) =

Site of University of Cape Town's Michaelis School of Fine Art

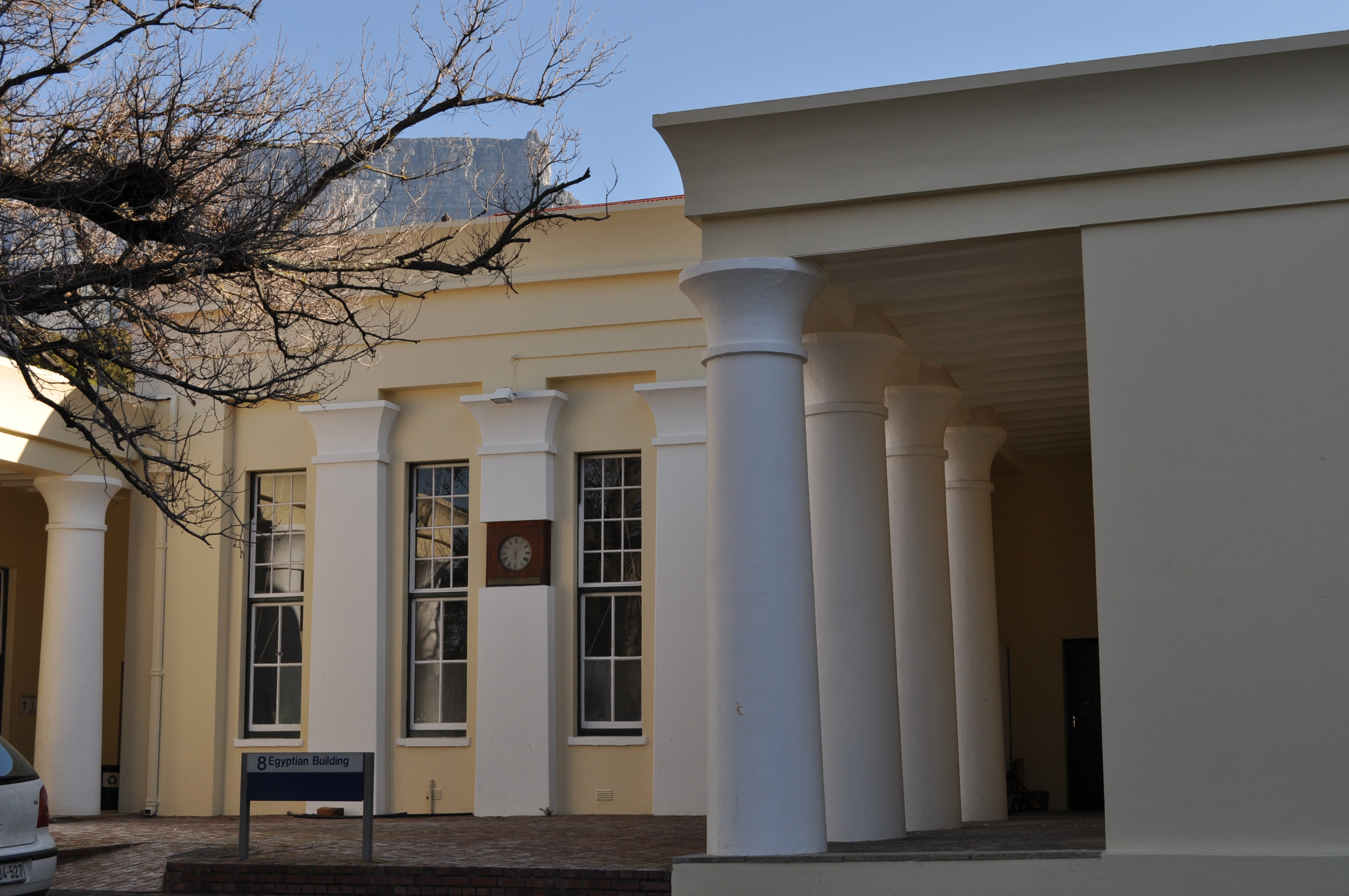
- Egyptian Building. Orange St, Cape Town.
- Interactive map of the Egyptian Building area

General information
- Architectural style: Egyptian Revival architecture
- Coordinates: 33.93034369716439°S 18.413934704613244°E
- Inaugurated: April 13, 1841
- Cost: £3,000

The Egyptian Building is the home of University of Cape Town's Michaelis School of Fine Art on that school's campus on Orange Street in Cape Town, South Africa.

After its foundation on October 1, 1829, the South African Athenaeum (also known as the South African College and the forerunner of the UCT as well as the South African College Schools secondary and primary institutions) was for a while housed in an orphanage 'Weeshuis' at the end of Long Street. This unsatisfactory situation continued until the late 1830s, when Governor Sir Benjamin D'Urban granted a plot of land to the school that had once housed a zoo at the end of Government Avenue in Company's Garden for use while a new building was constructed. The land could be accessed from Government Avenue through Leeuepoort, built by Louis Michel Thibault and Anton Anreith.

The college English professor, James Constantine Adamson, made a rough sketch of the building in the then-popular Egyptian Revival architecture style. Col. G.G. Lewis of the Royal Engineers adopted the proposal and expanded on it once finished with the old military hospital. When construction began on the new building, the site was still surrounded by the abandoned cages that once held animals for Capetonians' entertainment. It had apparently broken down by the time Prof. Adamson opened the college on April 13, 1841. The construction cost £3,000, but the new building was a major improvement on the cramped conditions on Long Street.

The history of the building is well described in the Cape Town History Site.

== Bibliography ==
- (nl) Dreyer, Rev. Andries. 1910. Historisch Album van de Nederduitsche Gereformeerde Kerk in Suid-Afrika. Cape Town: Cape Times Beperkt.
- (af) Hopkins, Dr. H.C. 1965. Die Moeder van ons Almal. Geskiedenis van die Gemeente Kaapstad, 1665–1965. Cape Town/Pretoria: N.G. Kerk-Uitgewers en -Boekhandel.
- Picton-Seymour, Désirée. 1989. Historical buildings in South Africa. Cape Town: Struikhof Publishers.
- Whiteford, R. in Peacock, M.A. 1972. Some famous South African Schools, vol. I: English-medium boys' high schools. Cape Town: Longman Southern Africa.
