= Christof Heyns =

South African academic (1959–2021)

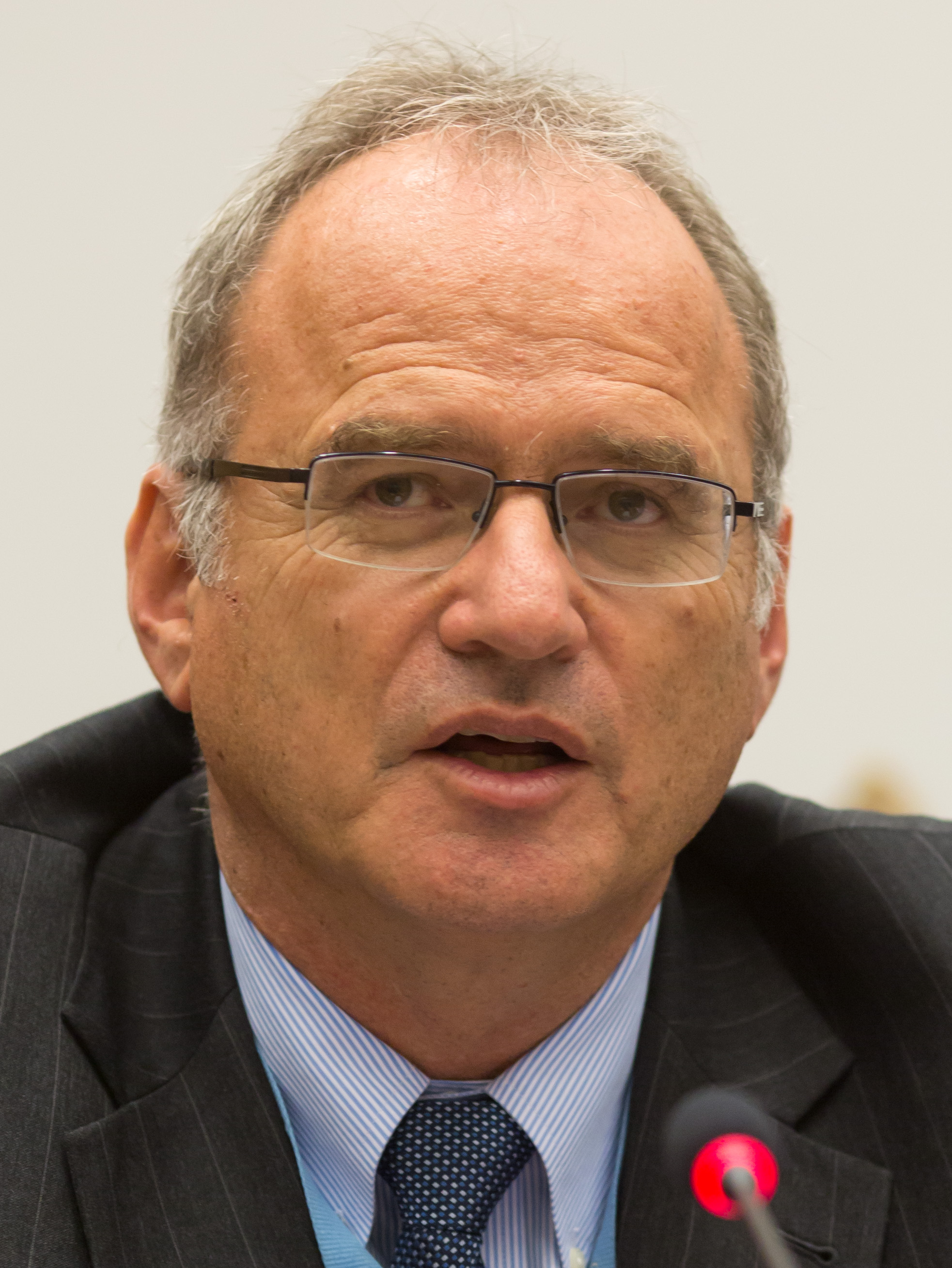
- Christof Heyns, June 2015

United Nations Special Rapporteur on extrajudicial, summary or arbitrary executions
- In office 2010–2016
- Preceded by: Philip Alston
- Succeeded by: Agnès Callamard

Member of the United Nations Human Rights Committee
- In office 2017–2021

Personal details
- Born: Christoffel Hendrik Heyns; 10 January 1959
- Died: 28 March 2021 (aged 62) Stellenbosch, South Africa
- Parent: Johan Heyns
- Education: University of Pretoria; Yale University; University of Witwatersrand

Christoffel Hendrik Heyns (10 January 1959 – 28 March 2021) was a Professor of Human Rights Law, Director of the Institute for International and Comparative Law in Africa at the University of Pretoria and a South African member of the United Nations Human Rights Committee. He served as United Nations Special Rapporteur on extrajudicial, summary or arbitrary executions from 2010 to 2016. Heyns was a visiting professor at American University Washington College of Law's Academy on Human Rights and Humanitarian Law (2006–2012).

== Education ==
Heyns held the degrees MA LLB from the University of Pretoria, an LLM from Yale Law School and PhD from the University of the Witwatersrand. He was also an adjunct professor at the Washington College of Law of the American University and since 2005 a visiting fellow at Kellogg College at Oxford University.

== Former positions ==
- Director - Centre for Human Rights, University of Pretoria Faculty of Law
- Dean - University of Pretoria Faculty of Law
- Founding editor-in-chief - African Human Rights Law Reports
- Consultant to the United Nations Office of the High Commissioner for Human Rights (inter alia on the establishment of a regional human rights system in South East Asia), the African Union and the South African Human Rights Commission.

== Awards ==
- Fulbright Fellowship to Yale Law School
- Alexander von Humboldt Fellowship to the Max Planck Institute for International and Comparative Public Law in Heidelberg, Germany
- University of Pretoria's Chancellor's Award for Teaching and Learning.

== Lectures ==
- Human Rights Law in Africa in the Lecture Series of the United Nations Audiovisual Library of International Law
