= World Human Rights Moot Court Competition =

International human rights mooting competition

- Established: 2009
- Venue: Geneva
- Subject matter: International human rights
- Class: International
- Record participation: 92 teams (2024)
- Qualification: Regional rounds
- Most championships: Norman Manley Law School (3)
- Website: www.ohchr.org/EN/HRBodies/HRC/Pages/NelsonMandelaWorldHRMootCourt.aspx

The Nelson Mandela World Human Rights Moot Court Competition is a moot court competition on international human rights law. In 2009, the University of Pretoria Faculty of Law's Centre for Human Rights, with the assistance of the Office of the United Nations High Commissioner for Human Rights, organised the inaugural edition. Previously, the oral rounds of the competition were held annually in Pretoria, the administrative and de facto capital of South Africa. In more recent years, the competition has been held in Geneva, where the United Nations is headquartered.

More than pure aspirations, human rights are real rights that can be tested in courts of law. The World Human Rights Moot Court Competition is an exciting way for students from around the world to deepen their knowledge of rights and learn from each other.

— Navi Pillay,
United Nations High Commissioner for Human Rights

== Moot format ==
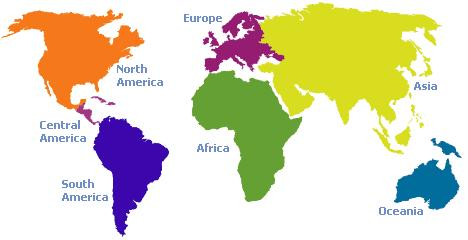
A select number of teams are chosen from each UN World Region

The earlier editions of the moot were held at the University of Pretoria Faculty of Law

The moot involves a written round after which teams are selected for the oral round. Teams argue a hypothetical case on issues of international human rights law in English, Spanish, or French as if it will be adjudicated by a hypothetical International Human Rights Court, on the basis of the Universal Declaration of Human Rights and other applicable (such as regional) human rights instruments.

The regional rounds are judged by distinguished legal academics and legal professionals from around the world. In the final for the international rounds, the panel is made up of eminent jurists and judges from international tribunals and bodies such as the different regional human rights courts and UN human rights treaty bodies. The inaugural presiding judge was Navi Pillay, while Judge Mark Villiger of the European Court of Human Rights presided in the 2010 final.

== Previous overall winners (English rounds) ==
Year	Winner	Runner-up	Best Memorial	Best Oralist
2009	None declared	None declared	None declared	None declared
2010	Norman Manley Law School	University of Sydney	Ateneo de Manila University	Norman Manley Law School
2011	Norman Manley Law School	Yale University	Ateneo de Manila University	Yale University
2012	Norman Manley Law School	University of Auckland	None declared	None declared
2013	None declared	None declared	None declared	None declared
2014	University of New South Wales	University of Lucerne	University of New South Wales	University of New South Wales
2015	University of São Paulo	Yale University	Symbiosis Law School	University of São Paulo
2016	Patrick Henry College	Moi University	None declared	None declared
2017	St Thomas University	University of Buenos Aires	Midlands State University	Strathmore University
2018	University of Buenos Aires	St Thomas University	Midlands State University	University of Oxford
2019	University of Oxford	Macquarie University	None declared	University of Oxford
2020 (online)	Strathmore University	Kenyatta University	National University of Singapore	Army Institute of Law
2021 (online)	Strathmore University	Universidad Central del Ecuador	Atma Jaya Catholic University of Indonesia	Universidad Central del Ecuador
2022	Singapore Management University	Geneva Academy of International Humanitarian Law and Human Rights	University of Oxford	
2023	National University of Advanced Legal Studies	St Thomas University	University of Bueno Aires	St Thomas University
2024	University of New South Wales	Singapore Management University	Nelson Mandela University	

== See also ==
- Moot court
- Centre for Human Rights
- African Human Rights Moot Court Competition
- South African National Schools Moot Court Competition
- Mock trial
