= Theo van Wyk =

South African judge

The Honourable Theo van Wyk KC

Judge President of the Cape Provincial Division
- In office 1973–1975
- Preceded by: Andrew Beyers
- Succeeded by: Helm van Zijl

Judge of the Appellate Division
- In office 1961–1967

Judge of the Cape Provincial Division of the Supreme Court
- In office 1967–1973
- In office 1955–1961

Personal details
- Born: Jacques Theodore van Wyk; 15 June 1913 Vanrhynsdorp, Union of South Africa
- Died: 17 November 1975 (aged 62) Bellville, Western Cape, South Africa
- Education: University of Cape Town
- Profession: Advocate

Jacques Theodore van Wyk KC (15 June 1913 – 17 November 1975) was a South African judge and Judge President of the Cape Provincial Division of the Supreme Court from 1973 until 1975.

== Early life and education ==
Van Wyk was born in Vanrhynsdorp in the Western Cape and after completing his schooling at Vanrhynsdorp, he went on to the University of Cape Town. He obtained the degrees of B.A. in 1934 and LL.B. in 1935. As a student he was involved with NUSAS and during the last two years of his studies, was a member of the student parliament.

== Career ==
In 1936, van Wyk was appointed registrar to Justice H. S. van Zyl and the following year was admitted to the Cape Bar. In 1949, at the age of thirty-six, he became the youngest KC in the Union of South Africa. In 1955, van Wyk was appointed a judge in the Cape Provincial Division of the Supreme Court and in 1961, he was promoted to Judge of Appeal. Van Wyk, however resigned as Judge of Appeal in 1967 and rejoined the Cape Division of the Supreme Court. In 1973 he was appointed Judge President of the Cape, a post he had held until his death in 1975.

== Notable cases and awards ==
Van Wyk acted for the state in the constitutional crisis arising from the removal of the Coloureds from the common voters' roll during the fifties. Between 1962 and 1966 he was an ad hoc judge at the hearings of the International Court of Justice in The Hague on the South-West Africa issue.

In 1968 the University of Cape Town awarded him the LL.D. degree (honoris causa) for his services.
