= George Munnik =

South African judge

The Honourable George Munnik QC

Judge President of the Cape Provincial Division
- In office 1981–1991
- Preceded by: Jack Watermeyer
- Succeeded by: Gerald Friedman

Chief Justice of the Transkei High Court
- In office 1973–1981
- Preceded by: Office established
- Succeeded by: Joos Hefer

Judge of the Eastern Cape Local Division of the Supreme Court
- In office 1962–1973

Personal details
- Born: George Glaeser Anderson Munnik; 8 November 1921 Dordrecht, Union of South Africa
- Died: 30 March 2004 (aged 82)
- Education: University of Cape Town
- Profession: Advocate

George Glaeser Anderson Munnik QC (8 November 1921 – 30 March 2004) was a South African judge, Chief Justice of the Transkei High Court and Judge President of the Cape Provincial Division of the Supreme Court from 1981 until 1991.

== Early life and education ==
Munnik was born in Dordrecht in the Cape Province and after receiving his initial education in Dordrecht, finished his schooling at SACS. He studied law at the University of Cape Town and graduated with the degrees B.A. and LL.B.

== Career ==
Munnik began practicing as an advocate at the Johannesburg Bar in 1946 and in 1958 became Queen's counsel. He received his first acting appointment as a judge during 1960 at the Transvaal Provincial Division. In 1962 he moved from Johannesburg, as he was appointed judge at the Eastern Cape Local Division in Grahamstown. He was appointed the chief justice of the Transkei High Court in 1973. Although Munnik never practiced in Cape Town, he was appointed Judge President of the Cape Provincial Division in 1981, a post he had held until his retirement in 1991.

== Notable cases and honours ==
In 1983, Munnik presided over the trial of Dieter Gerhardt, who was charged with high treason as a spy for the Soviet Union. He was awarded a LL.D. degree by the University of Fort Hare in 1989.
