= Free State High Court =

Free State Division of the High Court of South Africa
- Interactive map of Free State Division of the High Court of South Africa
- 29.1185°S 26.217°E
- Established: 1875 (High Court of Justice of the Orange Free State)
- Jurisdiction: Free State, South Africa
- Location: Bloemfontein
- Coordinates: 29.1185°S 26.217°E
- Composition method: Presidential appointment on the advice of the Judicial Service Commission
- Authorised by: Chp. 8 of the Constitution; Superior Courts Act, 2013
- Appeals to: Supreme Court of Appeal or Constitutional Court
- Number of positions: 16

Judge President
- Currently: Cagney Musi
- Since: 2018

Deputy Judge President
- Currently: Martha Mbhele
- Since: 2021

The Free State High Court (in full the Free State Division of the High Court of South Africa) is a superior court of law with general jurisdiction over the Free State province of South Africa. The division sits at Bloemfontein and consists of 16 permanent judges including a judge president and deputy judge president.

== History ==
A High Court of Justice consisting of three judges was established as the superior court of the independent Orange Free State in 1875. This court ceased to exist as a result of the Anglo-Boer War; with the British victory the Orange Free State became the Orange River Colony, and a new High Court was established for the colony. When the Union of South Africa was formed in 1910 this court became the Orange Free State Provincial Division of the Supreme Court of South Africa. In 1997, on the adoption of the current Constitution of South Africa, it became a High Court, and in 2009 it was renamed the Free State High Court by the Renaming of High Courts Act. In 2013, in the restructuring brought about by the Superior Courts Act, it became the Free State Division of the High Court of South Africa.
