= African Human Rights Law Journal =

- Discipline: Law
- Language: English
- Edited by: Frans Viljoen and Christof Heyns

Publication details
- History: 2001–present
- Publisher: Juta Law (South Africa)
- Frequency: Biannual
- Open access: Delayed, 2 years

Standard abbreviations
- ISO 4: Afr. Hum. Rights Law J.

Indexing
- ISSN: 1609-073X

Links
- Journal homepage

The African Human Rights Law Journal publishes peer-reviewed contributions dealing with human rights related topics of relevance to Africa, Africans, and scholars of Africa. The journal appears twice a year, in March and October.

== Indexing ==
The journal is indexed in the International Bibliography of the Social Sciences (IBBS).

== See also ==
- Open access in South Africa
