= Andrew Beyers =

South African judge

The Honourable Andrew Beyers KC

Judge President of the Cape Provincial Division
- In office 1959–1973
- Preceded by: Jackie de Villiers
- Succeeded by: Theo van Wyk

Judge of the Appellate Division
- In office 1959–1959

Judge of the Cape Provincial Division of the Supreme Court of South Africa
- In office 1955–1959

Personal details
- Born: Andries Brink Beyers; 30 October 1903 Caledon, Cape Colony
- Died: 6 September 1975 (aged 71) Durban, Natal, South Africa
- Education: Stellenbosch University
- Profession: Advocate

Andries Brink Beyers KC (30 October 1903 – 6 September 1975) known as "Andrew", was a South African jurist, judge and Judge President of the Cape Provincial Division of the Supreme Court from 1959 until 1973.

== Early life and education ==
Beyers was born in Caledon in the Cape Colony, the son of a farmer, Johannes Wilhelmus Wessels Beyers and his wife, Anna Magdalena Oosthuizen. He matriculated at the Caledon Public School, after which he studied law at the University of Stellenbosch, and graduated with distinction.

== Career ==
Beyers started in 1928 as a senior lecturer in Roman-Dutch law at Stellenbosch University and in 1936 he decided to give up an academic career and joined the Cape Bar. He was known as a trial lawyer and in 1946, he was appointed a King's Counsel. He was leading counsel for the government in the constitutional cases concerning the validity of the Separate Representation of Voters Act in 1952 and 1953.

In August 1954, he received an acting appointment as judge of the Cape Provincial Division of the Supreme Court, and in 1955, he was permanently appointed to the Cape Bench. In 1959, he became judge of appeal but was uncomfortable in the position and in August 1959, he returned to the Cape as Judge President.

In 1966, Beyers presided over the trial of Dimitri Tsafendas, after the assassination of the Prime Minister, H. F. Verwoerd, in the House of Assembly in Cape Town. He found that Tsafendas was mentally unfit to stand trial and ruled that he should be confined for life as a ward of the State.

== Personal life ==
Beyers was married three times and had a son and two daughters by his first wife, Margaret Hutchings. He retired in 1973, after which he first lived in Kalk Bay, but later moved to Umhlanga, KwaZulu-Natal and he died in Durban, in 1975.
