= Tembeka Ngcukaitobi =

South African lawyer (born 1976)

Tembeka Ngcukaitobi SC
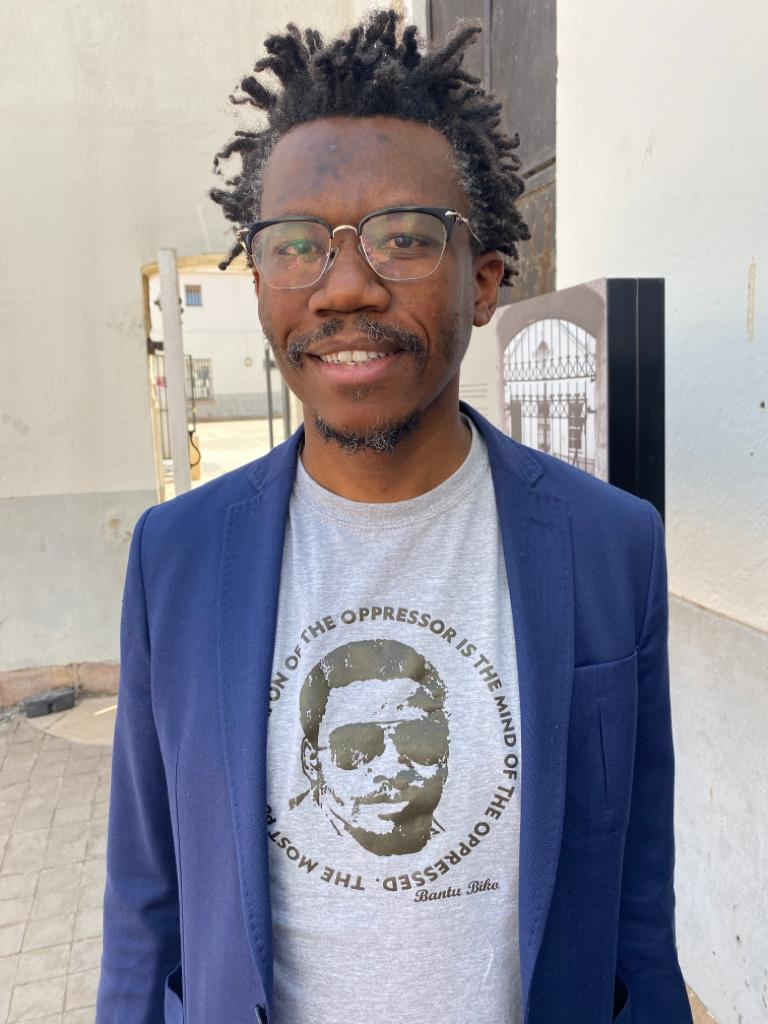
- Ngcukaitobi at an event in Constitution Hill, October 2019
- Born: Tembeka Nicholas Ngcukaitobi; 25 December 1976 (age 49); Cala, Transkei, South Africa
- Education: University of Transkei (LLB); Rhodes University (LLM); London School of Economics and Political Science (LLM)
- Occupations: Advocate; legal scholar
- Relatives: Lulama Ngcukaitobi (brother)

Tembeka Nicholas Ngcukaitobi SC (born 25 December 1976) is a South African lawyer and legal scholar. An advocate of the Johannesburg Bar since August 2010, he gained silk status in February 2020. He is currently a member of the Judicial Service Commission and a part-time member of the Competition Commission's Competition Tribunal.

Born in the former Transkei, Ngcukaitobi clerked for Justice Arthur Chaskalson on the Constitutional Court of South Africa. He spent several years as an attorney for Bowman Gilfillan before joining the bar and the constitutional litigation unit of the Legal Resources Centre. He has since argued in front of the Constitutional Court on behalf of clients including the Economic Freedom Fighters, the Zondo Commission, and President Cyril Ramaphosa, as well as at the International Court of Justice in the South Africa v Israel case.

In addition to his expertise in constitutional and public law, he has experience in competition law, labour law, and land law. He has written two books about land dispossession and land reform, The Land Is Ours (2018) and Land Matters (2021), and he has acted as a judge in the Labour Court, the Land Claims Court, and the High Court of South Africa.

== Early life and education ==
Ngcukaitobi was born on 25 December 1976 in Cala in the former Transkei, now part of the Eastern Cape; he grew up in the nearby village of Lupapasi. His mother, Nomsa, was a domestic worker, a teacher at a school for the disabled, and then a nurse, and his father, Gcinabantu Hutchinson, was a mineworker in Johannesburg and then a clerk at the Magistrate's Court in Cofimvaba. His brother, Lulama Ngcukaitobi, later became a prominent politician in the governing African National Congress. Their father died in an accident in 1983 while studying law at the University of South Africa, and Ngcukaitobi became interested in law as a means of doing "what my father couldn't do".

He attended Mantanzima High School in Cala, and then, unable to afford the University of Natal, studied law on a bursary at the University of Transkei. He was president of the university's student representative council in 1997 and graduated with a BProc and an LLB in 1999. He later completed two LLMs, one at Rhodes University and another at the London School of Economics.

== Legal career ==
Ngcukaitobi began his legal career at the Legal Aid Clinic in Mthatha and then at the Legal Resources Centre in Grahamstown. He received offers to clerk on the Constitutional Court of South Africa for three different justices, Arthur Chaskalson, Sandile Ngcobo and Kate O'Regan; he chose to clerk for Chaskalson. After that, he worked at Bowman Gilfillan between 2001 and 2010.

In August 2010, Ngcukaitobi was admitted to the Johannesburg Bar as an advocate of the High Court of South Africa. He spent three years as director of the constitutional litigation unit at the Legal Resources Centre, during which time he worked with George Bizos as counsel for the families of the victims of the Marikana massacre. Over the next decade, he appeared in front of the Constitutional Court and frequently in front of the Competition Appeal Court, the High Court, and the Supreme Court of Appeal. Early in his career, he frequently served as junior counsel under Dali Mpofu, including in Gareth Cliff's campaign to be reinstated as a judge on Idols in 2015 and in the MDC Alliance's campaign to overturn the results of the 2018 Zimbabwean election; the Sunday Times nicknamed him "the Robin to Dali Mpofu's Batman".

In May 2019, less than a decade into his career as an advocate (an unusually short period), Ngcukaitobi announced that he had been recommended for silk status, which he duly received at the end of February 2020. He is currently attached to the Duma Nokwe Group at the Johannesburg Bar.

== Prominent cases ==
Ngcukaitobi rose to public prominence during the presidency of Jacob Zuma, when he represented the opposition Economic Freedom Fighters (EFF) in a series of politically controversial cases, including a 2016 Pretoria High Court bid to gain access to Thuli Madonsela's report on alleged state capture. In 2017, in EFF v Speaker, he fronted the EFF's successful bid to have the Constitutional Court order the Speaker of the National Assembly to implement another of Madonsela's reports, this one about the Nkandla scandal. Also in 2017, Ngcukaitobi represented the EFF in UDM v Speaker of the National Assembly.

In October 2019, the Department of Justice further announced that it would retain the assistance of Ngcukaitobi and three other senior advocates – Wim Trengove, Ngwako Maenetje, and Geoff Budlender – in guiding state capture-related investigations and prosecutions. R5 million was made available for the legal fees of each advocate. A year later, former President Zuma accused Ngcukaitobi of "irregular" collusion with Deputy Chief Justice Raymond Zondo, who was leading the Commission of Inquiry into State Capture. In subsequent months, Ngcukaitobi served as counsel for the Zondo Commission, in which capacity he argued before the Constitutional Court that Zuma's failure to appear before the commission amounted to contempt of court. Zuma was represented by Ngcukaitobi's former mentor, Dali Mpofu. After the Constitutional Court handed Zuma a prison sentence, Ngcukaitobi also represented the Zondo Commission in challenging Zuma's further attempts to avoid serving his sentence. Tony Leon, writing in the Business Day, commended his "splendid laceration of Zuma" during this period.

In 2020, Ngcukaitobi, under Wim Trengove, served as counsel to President Cyril Ramaphosa in his successful attempt to overturn Busisiwe Mkhwebane's report about alleged misconduct by Ramaphosa's CR17 campaign. The case went to the Constitutional Court on appeal. In 2023, Ngcukaitobi represented 19 parties, led by the UDM, in an application which sought to have the Pretoria High Court declare loadshedding to be unconstitutional.

In 2023–24, he was appointed as a member of the South African legal team arguing South Africa v. Israel regarding the Genocide Convention.

== Jurisprudence ==
Ngcukaitobi has served as an acting judge in the Labour Court and in the Land Claims Court. In the latter capacity, in 2016, he handed down judgement in Msiza v Director-General of the Department of Rural Development and Land Reform, ruling in favour of a labour tenant represented by the Legal Resources Centre. In terms of the Land Reform (Labour Tenant) Act, the tenant had been awarded ownership of the land that he and his father had occupied for six decades; the matter concerned a dispute over the amount of compensation to be paid to the land's former owner. Section 25 of the Constitution required that "just and equitable" compensation be paid, but Ngcukaitobi departed from existing jurisprudence in ruling that this provision did not require compensation equivalent to the land's market value. He ordered compensation to be paid at an amount that was R300,000 under the land's assessed market value. The Supreme Court of Appeal overturned his judgement in 2017, ordering compensation at the market value; it said that that Ngcukaitobi's R300,000 deduction from market value was arbitrary and that the valuation of a property's market value, calculated by a state expert, already took into account questions of justice and equity.

As an acting judge in the Eastern Cape High Court in 2021, Ngcukaitobi controversially overturned the conviction of Loyiso Coko, who had been sentenced to ten years' imprisonment for raping his girlfriend in July 2018. In a judgement written by Ngcukaitobi, he and judge Nyameko Gqamana said that the trial court, the Makhanda Regional Court, had erred in discounting Coko's argument that he had "genuinely believed" that his girlfriend had implicitly consented to penetrative sex; Ngcukaitobi pointed to Coko's evidence that the complainant had been "an equally active participant" in their foreplay, which had included oral sex. Lawyers for Human Rights and the African branch of the International Commission of Jurists both expressed disappointment in the judgement, and the matter was heard on appeal in the Supreme Court of Appeal in 2023. The appellate court overturned Ngcukaitobi's judgment in April 2024.

== Scholarship ==
In addition to several academic articles, Ngcukaitobi has written two well-received books about land law and land reform in South Africa. The Land Is Ours: South Africa’s First Black Lawyers and the Birth of Constitutionalism (2018) is based on several years' research and focuses on historical land dispossession under colonialism and apartheid, as well as its links to a burgeoning constitutionalism among black lawyers. Land Matters: South Africa’s Failed Reforms and the Road Ahead (2021), which was shortlisted for the 2022 Sunday Times CNA Literary Award, sets out an argument for reforming policies on land ownership and land occupation. Ngcukaitobi has been strongly and publicly critical of the African National Congress's record in post-apartheid land reform.

== Public service ==
Ngcukaitobi served as a commissioner at the South African Law Reform Commission from 2007 to 2011, having been appointed by President Thabo Mbeki. In September 2018, President Ramaphosa appointed him to a ten-member expert advisory panel on land reform policy, which was chaired by Vuyo Mahlati and tasked with supporting Deputy President David Mabuza's Inter-Ministerial Committee on Land Reform. The following year, during a contentious meeting in June 2019, he was elected president of the convocation of his alma mater, which had by then been restructured as Walter Sisulu University.

In October 2022, following consultation with political parties, President Ramaphosa appointed Ngcukaitobi as a member of the Judicial Service Commission, where he replaced Doris Tshepe. The opposition Democratic Alliance and African Christian Democratic Party welcomed his appointment, while the Freedom Front Plus raised "some question marks" but did not formally object. In January 2023, Ngcukaitobi was appointed as a part-time member of the Competition Commission's Competition Tribunal, with effect from April 2023. In July that year, he declined a nomination to stand as a candidate to replace Busisiwe Mkhwebane as Public Protector.

On 3 May, President Cyril Ramaphosa appointed Ngcukaitobi SC as an Acting Justice of the Constitutional Court for the period 1 June to 30 November 2026 for a period of six months.
