= Norman Manoim =

South African judge

The Honourable Norman Manoim

Judge President of the Competition Appeal Court
- Incumbent
- Assumed office 1 December 2022
- Appointed by: Cyril Ramaphosa
- Preceded by: Dennis Davis

Judge of the Competition Appeal Court
- Incumbent
- Assumed office 1 January 2022
- Appointed by: Cyril Ramaphosa

Judge of the High Court
- Incumbent
- Assumed office 1 July 2021
- Appointed by: Cyril Ramaphosa
- Division: Gauteng

Chairperson of the Competition Tribunal
- In office 1 August 2009 – 31 July 2019
- Appointed by: Jacob Zuma
- Preceded by: David Lewis
- Succeeded by: Mondo Mazwai

Personal details
- Born: Norman Michael Manoim; 24 February 1958 (age 68)
- Relations: Irwin Manoim (brother)
- Education: University of the Witwatersrand

Norman Michael Manoim (born 24 February 1958) is a South African judge who is currently serving as the Judge President of the Competition Appeal Court. He is also a judge of the Gauteng Division of the High Court of South Africa. Before he was appointed to the bench in 2021, he was the chairperson of the Competition Tribunal for two terms between 2009 and 2019.

During apartheid, from 1984 to 1998, Manoim was a practising attorney in Johannesburg, focusing on human rights law and labour law. He joined the Competition Tribunal when it was established in August 1999 and remained a full-time member for two decades thereafter, as chairperson from August 2009 onward. President Cyril Ramaphosa appointed him as a judge of the Gauteng High Court in July 2021 and as a puisne judge of the Competition Appeal Court in January 2022. He was named to a five-year term as the appellate's Judge President in December 2022.

== Early life and education ==
Manoim was born on 24 February 1958. After high school, he was served in the South African Defence Force before enrolling at the University of the Witwatersrand, where he graduated with a BA in 1980 and an LLB in 1983. At university, he became active in student anti-apartheid politics through the student newspaper, the Wits Student, and through the influence of his brother, Irwin Manoim (later a prominent journalist). He was the president of the student representative council from 1979 to 1980, and he also served as vice-president of the National Union of South African Students.

== Legal practice ==
After completing his articles of clerkship in 1984, Manoim joined Cheadle, Thompson and Haysom Attorneys, the firm of Halton Cheadle, Fink Haysom, and Clive Thompson. He rose through the ranks to become a partner at the firm, and his practice focused on human rights law, including political detentions and censorship, and labour law. He was also a member of the National Association of Democratic Lawyers throughout his legal career from 1984 to 1998. In 1989, his home in Yeoville, Johannesburg was firebombed while he was away on holiday; it was unclear whether the attack was intended for Manoim, for his brother (then a member of the Weekly Mail), or for one of his clients, Obed Bapela, who was staying in the house.

During the post-apartheid transition, Manoim's human rights work dwindled; instead, he worked with trade unions and their new investment arms. During this period, he developed his burgeoning specialism in competition law – among other things, he attended an antitrust law course by Phillip Areeda in 1993 and was a member of the Centre for Applied Legal Studies's study group on the topic in 1994. He was a member of the team which drafted the post-apartheid Competition Act, 1998, and thereafter, in 1998, was appointed as a member of the Competition Board.

== Competition Tribunal: 1999–2019 ==
In August 1999, Manoim joined the newly established Competition Tribunal. He served as a full-time member until August 2009, when President Jacob Zuma appointed him as the tribunal's chairperson; he succeeded David Lewis, who had held the position since the tribunal's inception. He was chairperson for a full ten-year period ending in July 2019, becoming the tribunal's longest-serving member; President Zuma reappointed him to a second term in August 2014.

Soon after he took office as chairperson, Manoim suggested that, for the sake of judicial efficacy, there should be no right to appeal Competition Tribunal matters to the Supreme Court of Appeal, and that right was indeed extinguished by the Seventeenth Amendment of the Constitution of South Africa in 2013. Another major shift during Manoim's tenure was the increased focus on imposing public interest conditions on mergers, as emphasised by Minister of Economic Development Ebrahim Patel and as imposed in high-profile Walmart–Massmart and AB InBev–Coca-Cola mergers. In contradistinction to this approach, Manoim wrote in his own decision in the Walmart–Massmart merger that the competition authorities' "job in merger control is not to make the world a better place, only to prevent it becoming worse as a result of a specific transaction". Likewise, he said in 2019 that he believed that the primary role of competition authorities in reducing monopoly power was not "breaking up markets [but] opening up markets for contestation, so, in other words, try to bring down the barriers to entry".

Manoim also presided in a dispute over the Competition Commission's long-running investigation into the so-called rand-rigging scandal, in which a large number of banks were accused of colluding to manipulate the rand; in 2019, he ruled that the commission's complaint against the banks was overly broad and ordered it to remedy the charges. Several of his decisions in the Competition Tribunal were published in law reports.

When Manoim's term ended on 31 July 2019, Mondo Mazwai was appointed to succeed him as chairperson of the Competition Tribunal. Manoim immediately began a brief stint at the University of Witwatersrand's Mandela Institute, where he was acting director until January 2020, and he additionally served as a professor of practice in the University of Johannesburg School of Economics. He was also appointed as an acting judge in November 2019; he served in the Income Tax Court and also presided in the Johannesburg High Court, where he heard a sexual harassment case against politician Shadow Shabangu.

== Gauteng High Court: 2021–present ==
In February 2021, the Judicial Service Commission announced that Manoim was among 14 candidates who had been shortlisted for possible appointment to six judicial vacancies in the Gauteng Division of the High Court of South Africa. During his interview, which was held in April, Manoim compared the Competition Tribunal to the Labour Court – both specialised courts of the first instance – and emphasised his transferable skills in adjudication. He was one of the six candidates whom the Judicial Service Commission recommended for appointment, and President Cyril Ramaphosa confirmed his appointment to the bench with effect from 1 July 2021.

== Competition Appeal Court: 2022–present ==
Within six weeks of becoming a judge, Manoim was shortlisted for an appellate position on the Competition Appeal Court, the body which hears appeals from the Competition Commission. He was viewed as "a shoo-in", and Advocate Tembeka Ngcukaitobi endorsed his candidacy, describing him as "South Africa's leading expert in competition law". The Judicial Service Commission interviewed him for the position in October 2021. In December, on the advice of the Judicial Service Commission, President Ramaphosa appointed Manoim to the appellate court with effect from 1 January 2022.

=== Judge Presidency ===
In July 2022, Manoim was the sole candidate shortlisted for the judge presidency of the Competition Appeal Court, which had been held by Judge Dennis Davis from the court's inception until his retirement in 2020. Asked by Julius Malema, a member of the panel, whether it was appropriate for the Judicial Service Commission to have shortlisted only "one white male", Manoim said, "I cannot help that other people have not applied." However, Judge Bashier Vally, another panellist and a colleague on the Competition Appeal Court, suggested that Manoim was the only candidate because he had systematically deprived younger candidates of the chance to gaining acting experience in the court. Manoim denied this, pointing out that judges were rarely permitted to accept the lengthy secondments that competition matters required and promising that he wanted to "build the court" as its president.

After the interviews, on the advice of the Judicial Service Commission, President Ramaphosa appointed Manoim to a five-year term as Judge President, beginning on 1 December 2022.
