= Kylie v CCMA =

South African legal case

- Court: Labour Appeal Court of South Africa
- Full case name: Kylie v Commission for Conciliation Mediation and Arbitration and Others
- Decided: 26 May 2010
- Docket nos.: CA 10/08
- Citations: [2010] ZALAC 8; 2010 (4) SA 383 (LAC); 2010 (10) BCLR 1029 (LAC); (2010) 31 ILJ 1600 (LAC); [2010] 7 BLLR 705 (LAC)

Case history
- Prior actions: Kylie v Commission for Conciliation Mediation and Arbitration and Others [2008] ZALC 86 in the Labour Court of South Africa

Court membership
- Judges sitting: Zondo JP, Davis JA and Jappie JA

Case opinions
- Section 23 of the Constitution of South Africa extends labour rights to sex workers, and sex workers are therefore entitled to protections against unfair dismissal in terms of the Labour Relations Act, 1995.
- Decision by: Davis JA (unanimous)

Keywords
- Commission for Conciliation, Mediation and Arbitration; contract of employment for illegal purpose; ex turpi causa non oritur actio; Labour Relations Act, 1995; labour rights; section 23 of the Constitution; sex work; unfair dismissal

Kylie v Commission for Conciliation, Mediation and Arbitration and Others is an important decision in South African labour law, handed down on 26 May 2010 in the Labour Appeal Court of South Africa. Writing for a unanimous court, Judge of Appeal Dennis Davis held that the Labour Relations Act, 1995 applied to sex workers and that the Commission for Conciliation, Mediation and Arbitration therefore had jurisdiction to hear a dispute between a sex worker and the brothel that had fired her. Although the court affirmed that sex workers' employment contracts were legally unenforceable, it held that sex workers were nonetheless protected by the labour rights granted in section 23 of the Constitution of South Africa.

== Background ==
The appellant, pseudonymized as Kylie, was employed as a sex worker at Brigitte's Massage Parlour, a brothel in Bellville, until she was fired in April 2006, among other things because she refused to render oral sex as "a matter of taste". She lodged a complaint at the Commission for Conciliation, Mediation and Arbitration (CCMA), alleging that she had been unfairly dismissed in terms of section 185 of the Labour Relations Act, 1995. However, before hearing any evidence on the merits of that complaint, the CCMA ruled in December 2006 that it lacked jurisdiction to arbitrate an unfair dismissal dispute in the sex work industry, which had been criminalised by the Sexual Offences Act, 1957.

== Prior action ==
Kylie challenged the CCMA's decision in the Labour Court of South Africa, where she was represented by Wim Trengove. On 31 July 2008 in Cape Town, Acting Judge Halton Cheadle dismissed her suit. Cheadle held that the Labour Relations Act cannot be read to grant sex workers an enforceable statutory right to a fair dismissal. The enforcement of a claim to such a right would be contrary to the "fundamental principle" in common law that courts "ought not to sanction or encourage illegal activity". For Cheadle, in line with this principle, it was clear that sex workers' employment contracts are unenforceable, because they are illegal under the Sexual Offences Act; the ex turpi causa non oritur actio rule outweighed the in pari delicto rule.

However, Cheadle also noted that the Labour Relations Act is grounded in the labour rights granted in section 23 of the Constitution of South Africa, and considered the possibility that, notwithstanding the invalidity of the contractual employment relationship, section 23 might extend constitutional protections to those engaged in illegal employment; in that case, the Labour Relations Act (or Cheadle's interpretation of it) might be inconsistent with the Constitution. Yet Cheadle concluded that sex workers are not included in the scope of section 23, because granting section 23 rights to sex workers would sanction or encourage illegal activity, in violation of common law principles, and would therefore undermine the rule of law, in violation of a fundamental constitutional value. Alternatively, even if sex workers do have section 23 rights, the Labour Relations Act – in denying protection against unfair dismissal to sex workers – imposes a justifiable limitation on those rights, because the limitation "gives effect" to the rule-of-law principle that courts should not sanction illegal activity.

Kylie lodged an appeal, which was heard in 2010 in the Labour Appeal Court, sitting in Johannesburg. Presiding were Judge President Raymond Zondo and Judges of Appeal Dennis Davis and Achmat Jappie.

== Judgment ==
The Labour Appeal Court's unanimous decision was handed down by Judge Davis on 26 May 2010. The decision was premised on the court's interpretation of section 23(1) of the Constitution, which provides that "everyone has the right to fair labour practices". Davis held that the word "everyone" should be read broadly and literally, in line with Justice Arthur Chaskalson's approach in S v Makwanyane (on the right to life of criminals) and Justice Yvonne Mokgoro's approach in Khosa v Minister of Social Development (on the socioeconomic rights of non-citizens). Section 23 of the Constitution provides broad protections for the dignity of all those in an employment relationship, regardless of whether the employment relationship is governed by a legally enforceable contract. The Labour Relations Act must be read to preserve and implement those protections, as recently held by the Constitutional Court in Chirwa v Transnet.

Having found that Kylie had a constitutional right to fair labour practices, the court also found that she was entitled to legal relief for the violation of that right. Davis held that there is "no principled reason by which she should not be entitled to some constitutional protection designed to protect her dignity and which protection by extension has now been operationalised in the LRA", especially given that sex workers were members of a vulnerable class. Davis reflected unfavourably on the United States Supreme Court's decision in Hoffman Plastic Compounds, Inc. v. NLRB, commenting of the United States Supreme Court that "much of their jurisprudence can be described as being significantly incongruent with our Constitution’s commitment to freedom, equality and dignity and its concern to protect the vulnerable, exploited and powerless"; instead, Davis aligned himself with "the more enlightened minority opinion" of Justice Stephen Breyer, who had argued that employers should not be allowed to use the illegal immigration status of employees to relieve themselves of their responsibilities under labour law.

The Labour Appeal Court therefore held that, even though Kylie's employment contract was legally unenforceable, the law could take cognisance of her employment relationship and recognise her as an employee for the purposes of section 185 of the Labour Relations Act. Were Kylie to prove that she had been unfairly dismissed, the illegal nature of her trade might well affect the determination of proper remedies, but:

only those rights which are necessary for the implementation of the provisions of the [Labour Relations] Act are to be removed from the enjoyment of appellant. Her dignity is not to be exploited or abused. This remains intact and the concomitant constitutional protection must be available to her as it would to any person whose dignity is attacked unfairly.

The court therefore upheld Kylie's appeal, setting aside the CCMA's ruling and ordering that the CCMA had jurisdiction to adjudicate the unfair dismissal dispute.

== Reception ==
Legal experts said that the judgment was unprecedented worldwide. It is often viewed as a complement to the Labour Court's 2008 decision in Discovery Health Limited v CCMA on the application of labour law to employees lacking valid work permits – those "who perform work illegally", in contrast to Kylie and other "employees performing illegal work".
