= Dennis Davis (judge) =

South African jurist

The Honourable Dennis Davis

Judge President of the Competition Appeal Court
- In office 2000–2020
- Appointed by: Thabo Mbeki
- Preceded by: Court established
- Succeeded by: Norman Manoim

Judge of the High Court
- In office 1998–2020
- Appointed by: Nelson Mandela
- Division: Western Cape

Personal details
- Born: David Martin Dennis; 1 May 1951 (age 74) Cape Town, Cape Province; Union of South Africa
- Spouse: Claudette Davis
- Education: Herzlia School
- Alma mater: University of Cape Town; University of Cambridge

David Martin Dennis (born 1 May 1951) is a South African legal academic, jurist, and retired judge who was the Judge President of the Competition Appeal Court between 2000 and 2020. He served concurrently as a judge of the Western Cape Division of the High Court of South Africa between 1998 and 2020. Retired from the bench since December 2020, he is currently an emeritus professor at the University of Cape Town and the chairperson of the Companies Tribunal.

== Early life and education ==
Davis was born on 1 May 1951 in Cape Town. He was raised in a working-class Jewish family – his father was a motor mechanic and his mother was a legal secretary – and attended Herzlia School in Cape Town, where he, later said, he was taught orthodox Zionist "rubbish". However, as a teenager, he was heavily influenced by an English class on Alan Paton's Cry, the Beloved Country, as well as by his experience in Habonim, where his group leader, a young John Comaroff, exposed him to the works of Karl Marx. His first practical political engagement was in 1970, when he canvassed for Colin Eglin ahead of the 1970 general election.

Attracted by law's potential "to undo injustice in the world", Davis studied law at the University of Cape Town, where he became increasingly engaged in the anti-apartheid movement and increasingly inclined towards a radical, rather than liberal, politics. His influences included an early experience watching Steve Biko speak at the university campus, as well as the work of Harold Wolpe and Martin Legassick, who at the time were pioneering a revisionist, Marxist analysis of apartheid. He also volunteered for the Workers Advice Bureau in nearby townships. In 1975, he graduated from the University of Cape Town with a BCom LLB, ranked second in his class.

== Early academic career ==
After graduation, Davis worked briefly as a legal advisor in the tax practice at Old Mutual, planning to save money for postgraduate study overseas. He was admitted as an advocate of the Supreme Court in 1977. However, later in 1977, he was offered a teaching post at the University of Cape Town, teaching insurance law and tax law. From 1978, he also taught a legal theory class which was closer to his own interests, covering natural law and Marxism. His students in the class's first cohort included Nicholas Haysom, with whom he set up a reading group covering Marx, Nicos Poulantzas, and Evgeny Pashukanis.

In 1979, Davis was granted a two-year sabbatical, which he took at the University of Cambridge, completing an MPhil in criminology in 1980. His supervisor was Colin Sumner, and he was also heavily influenced by Stuart Hall, E. P. Thompson, and Thompson's Whigs and Hunters, which he later said influenced his approach to anti-apartheid activism insofar as it posed "the question of the dialectic of law: the constraining and the emancipatory components of law".

Confirmed in his Marxist viewpoint, Davis returned to South Africa in the second half of 1980 and resumed teaching at the University of Cape Town. He later described it as "a lonely intellectual period", in which he and Raymond Suttner were the only Marxist legal academics in South Africa. Alongside his academic work, he practised as an advocate in Cape Town, specialising in tax law and public law. He became involved in the Society for the Abolition of the Death Penalty, fostered ties to the burgeoning trade union movement, and joined the anti-apartheid United Democratic Front when it was launched in 1983. He was briefly detained for his activism, and he also briefly returned to the University of Cambridge between 1984 and 1985, teaching at the university while his wife completed her doctorate there.

Promoted to associate professor in 1984, he was appointed to a personal chair in the University of Cape Town's commercial law department in 1989. During this period, amid the negotiations to end apartheid, Davis joined the African National Congress when it was unbanned in 1990.

== Post-apartheid transition ==
Also in 1990, Davis was approached to become director of the Centre for Applied Legal Studies at the University of the Witwatersrand (Wits), a position which would be vacated upon John Dugard's retirement. He took up the position in January 1991, moving to Johannesburg and accepting a parallel position as professor of law at Wits; from 1996 to 1998, he was also jointly appointed as a professor at the University of Cape Town. Over the next few years, the Centre for Applied Legal Studies sought a central role in the drafting of the post-apartheid Constitution; Davis himself was an expert legal advisor to the Convention for a Democratic South Africa and Multi-Party Negotiating Forum between 1992 and 1994, focusing primarily on electoral law.

From 1993 to 1998, Davis was the host of an SABC television programme called Future Imperfect, each episode of which assembled a panel of politicians and presented them with a hypothetical policy issue in a future government. The programme was acclaimed in South Africa and was described by the New York Times as "a glimpse of television's power to help make a democracy". Davis's public commentary during this period led to a notorious televised altercation with Barney Pityana, who called Davis a racist and whom Davis demanded should resign from the South African Human Rights Commission.

After the 1994 general election, the Centre for Applied Legal Studies became closely involved in constitutional litigation, and Davis was a member of the Katz Commission, which made recommendations about post-apartheid tax structure in South Africa, leading ultimately to the establishment of the South African Revenue Service (SARS). He also served as an acting judge in the Cape Division of the High Court of South Africa in 1996, though he felt unwelcome in the division as a "white lefty". The following year, he was a member of the team that drafted the Competition Act, 1998; he was on sabbatical in London, England at the time, and some of the drafting took place at the Holiday Inn in King's Cross. Shortly afterwards, Davis agreed to accept nomination to a permanent judicial seat – according to him, he turned down Cape Judge President Gerald Friedman's offer of a permanent appointment in 1996, but was prevailed upon by Chief Justice Ismail Mahomed. In October 1998, he resigned from the Centre for Applied Legal Studies to return to Cape Town and join the Cape High Court bench permanently.

== Judicial career ==
=== Western Cape High Court: 1998–2020 ===
During his 21 years in the High Court, Davis presided over several politically sensitive matters, notably including several floor-crossing disputes and the murder trial of Daliwonga Mandela. He also overturned the appointment of Hlaudi Motsoeneng as chief operating officer of the SABC.

At the same time, he handed down several landmark judgements in public and constitutional law. Government v Grootboom, a landmark Constitutional Court case which upheld the justiciability of socioeconomic rights, upheld a High Court judgement written by Davis in 2000. Likewise, the decriminalisation of personal marijuana use, ordered by the Constitutional Court in Minister of Justice and Constitutional Development v Prince, originated in a 2017 judgement by Davis, which argued that criminalisation unjustifiably limited the constitutional right to privacy. Also notable was his 2004 judgement that sections of the Maintenance of the Surviving Spouse Act were unconstitutional insofar as they discriminated against unmarried life-partners, although that judgement was overturned by the Constitutional Court majority in Volks v Robinson.

In 2003, Judge Robin Marais of the Supreme Court of Appeal wrote a minority judgement in an appeal from Davis's court, Shoprite Checkers v Bumpers Schwarmas, specifically to chastise Davis for repeating witnesses' "lavatorial" language (the expressions "stuff you", "gatvol", and "bullshit") in a judgement which was subsequently published in the law reports.

=== Competition Appeal Court: 2000–2020 ===
In October 1999, alongside his High Court colleague Selwyn Selikowitz, Davis was interviewed by the Judicial Service Commission as a candidate for possible appointment to the newly established Competition Appeal Court. Early the following year, he was appointed to the appeal court and named as its inaugural Judge President. He served in that position for two terms over more than two decades; he was reappointed in July 2013 on the advice of the Judicial Service Commission.

In 2011–2012 in the Competition Appeal Court, Davis presided in the government's attempt to block a proposed merger between Walmart and Massmart. In March 2012, he dismissed the government's application, finding that the benefits of the merger outweighed its costs, but he acknowledged that the costs were nonetheless significant and attached additional conditions to the transaction, including the reinstatement of retrenched employees and a formal assessment of possible measures to localise the benefits of the merger. Ebrahim Patel, the Minister of Economic Development, welcomed the judgement, which he said, "goes a long way to addressing how we can deal with consequences of the merger". Minister of Economic Development v Competition Tribunal, South African Commercial, Catering and Allied Workers Union v Wal-Mart Stores, which was co-written with Judge Dumisani Zondi, set significant precedent in competition law and particularly in the interpretation of the so-called public interest clause of the Competition Act.

=== Labour Appeal Court: 2007–2018 ===
In December 2007, President Thabo Mbeki appointed Davis to the Labour Appeal Court, where he served until 2018. During that time, he handed down a landmark judgement in Kylie v Commission for Conciliation Mediation and Arbitration, an unfair dismissal complaint brought by a sex worker. Dennis ruled that the Commission for Conciliation, Mediation and Arbitration had jurisdiction to hear the complaint, writing that, "the fact that prostitution is rendered illegal does not — destroy all the constitutional protection which may be enjoyed by someone as an appellant, were they not to be a sex worker".

=== Constitutional Court nomination: 2009 ===
In 2009, with four vacancies expected to arise on the Constitutional Court bench, Davis – then the only white judge president in the country – was considered a favourite among members of the legal community. The Judicial Service Commission shortlisted him for elevation and interviewed him in September 2009. During the interview, he responded coldly to questioning from commissioner Cecil Burgess about his relationship with John Hlophe, the Judge President of the Western Cape Division; when pressed, he said that he and Hlophe had profound ideological differences. He was also confronted about missing a judicial conference to go on holiday, a point raised by candidate Mogoeng Mogoeng – Davis explained that he had been climbing Mount Kilimanjaro at the time – and about the ostensible "high rate" of appeals of his judgement – he explained that only 27 of 140 reported judgements had been appealed, and only 12 of them overturned.

However, the Judicial Service Commission did not recommend Davis for elevation, excluding him from the condensed shortlist of candidates recommended to President Jacob Zuma. In subsequent years, he did not apply again for elevation to the Constitutional Court, later joking that the interviews were too long for his liking.

=== Davis Tax Committee: 2013–2018 ===
From 2013 to 2018, Davis chaired the Davis Tax Committee, the mandate of which was to assess South Africa's tax policy framework and submit related recommendations to the Minister of Finance. The committee was established in July 2013 by Finance Minister Pravin Gordhan; outlining the terms of reference, he and Davis pointed to the development of new forms of base erosion and profit shifting that arose from globalised forms of economic activity and contemporary revenue streams. During its tenure, the committee met 205 times and submitted 25 reports. It submitted its final four reports in April 2018. Because Davis was still a sitting judge, his work for the committee was unpaid.

The committee's tenure coincided with much of the tenure of SARS commissioner Tom Moyane, who was later accused of intentionally facilitating the capture of SARS by private interests. In 2016 and 2017, relations between SARS and the Davis Tax Committee deteriorated sharply after the press quoted Davis as pointing to declining personal income tax collection as a "red flag" and a reflection of the agency's declining enforcement capacity. In response to these reports, SARS published a statement accusing Davis of having "for some time now behaved in a manner that could be perceived as advocating a veiled strategy to mobilise a possibility of a tax revolt by taxpayers against the state... SARS has lost all confidence and respect for Judge Davis". In August 2018, Davis testified before the Nugent Commission about the breakdown in relations between Moyane and his committee.

=== Public engagement and political views ===
From October 2004 onwards, while a sitting judge, Davis hosted Judge for Yourself, a current affairs programme on E.tv. Through this and other forums, he was unusually active, among sitting judges, in public and policy debate, though Paul Hoffman observed in the Mail & Guardian that he was "fond of utilising the pregnant rhetorical question as a device to stimulate controversy in which he is then not implicated". Among other things, during his time as a sitting judge, he argued publicly in favour of a wealth tax, against the willing-buyer, willing-seller approach to land expropriation, and against the 2008–2009 Israeli bombardment of Gaza. However, Davis reflected in 2021 that his politics moderated during his time on the bench and that he no longer hoped for the Constitution to be "revolutionary" as much as he hoped for it to be "seriously social democratic in a profound way".

=== Other activities ===
In addition to serving as a visiting professor in several universities in the United States, Davis continued to teach tax, constitutional law, competition law and legal theory at the University of Cape Town, and he was granted an honorary professorship in 2018. He engaged in robust debate with his colleague and former student, Anton Fagan, whom he accused of perpetuating "a conservative culture of law" on the campus and of "a form of positivism completely unhinged from any normative vision".

Between 2003 and 2008, Davis was a member of the Corporate Law Reform Initiative which drafted the Companies Act, 2008, and, after the Davis Tax Committee concluded its work, he continued to work intermittently with the National Treasury: he was a member of the panel of experts that headhunted Edward Kieswetter to succeed Moyane as SARS commissioner in 2019, and during the same period, Finance Minister Tito Mboweni commissioned him to conduct an assessment of the tax gap in South Africa.

== Retirement ==
Davis retired from the bench in December 2020. However, he continued to teach at the University of Cape Town, and to host Judge for Yourself on eNCA as well as an interview webcast, Judgment Date with Judge Dennis Davis, hosted by the Daily Maverick. He remained an active public commentator, among other things pronouncing himself in favour of a once-off "solidarity tax" to fund COVID-19 vaccine procurement, lifestyle audits of wealthy individuals, treating baseless political attacks on the judiciary as contempt of court offences, resolving the Israeli occupation of the West Bank, and empowering SARS to institute criminal prosecution of non-compliant taxpayers.

Soon after his retirement, in early 2021, SARS announced that it had retained Davis's services as a consultant. In December 2022, he was additionally appointed as the chairperson of the Companies Tribunal. In the latter capacity, he mediated the Spar Group's agreement to phase exclusive lease agreements in retail centres.

In November 2023, Davis was recalled to the Competition Appeal Court bench to hear further applications in the so-called rand-rigging case, in which the Competition Commission sought to charge 28 foreign and domestic banks with colluding to manipulate the rand. He had presided in other applications in the matter in 2020, before his retirement.

== Personal life ==
He is married to Claudette Davis, with whom he has two children, and lives in Milnerton, Cape Town. He is a Manchester United supporter and has been a member of the board of the Cape Town Philharmonic Orchestra since 2012. He was formerly the chairperson of the Cape Jewish Board of Deputies from 2003 to 2005.
