= Competition Tribunal =

A Competition Tribunal is an independent body that adjudicates matters relating to competition law. Its function is to hear and decide competition cases, which in certain jurisdictions, are referred to it by a Competition Commission.

Competition Tribunal may refer to such bodies in various countries.

== Competition Tribunals by country ==
- Australian Competition Tribunal
- Competition Appeal Tribunal (United Kingdom)
- Competition Tribunal (Canada)
- Competition Tribunal (Hong Kong)
- Competition Tribunal (South Africa)

== See also ==
- Competition Appeal Court (South Africa)
- Competition Commission (South Africa)
- Competition Commission (United Kingdom)
- History of competition law
