= Superior court =

Court with general jurisdiction over criminal and civil cases

In common law systems, a superior court is a court of general jurisdiction over civil and criminal legal cases. A superior court is "superior" in relation to a court with limited jurisdiction (see small claims court), which is restricted to civil cases involving monetary amounts with a specific limit, or criminal cases involving offenses of a less serious nature. A superior court may hear appeals from lower courts (see court of appeal). For courts of general jurisdiction in civil law system, see ordinary court.

== Etymology ==
The term "superior court" has its origins in the English court system. The royal courts were the highest courts in the country, with what would now be termed supervisory jurisdiction over baronial and local courts. Decisions of those courts could be reviewed by the royal courts, as part of the Crown's role as the ultimate fountain of justice. The royal courts became known as the "superior courts", and lower courts whose decisions could be reviewed by the royal courts became known as "inferior courts". The decisions of the superior courts were not reviewable or appealable unless an appeal was created by statute.

== In particular jurisdictions ==
=== Brazil ===
The Federal Constitution divides the federal judiciary into the common justice for most civil and criminal cases, and specialized justice (labor, electoral, military) which deals with specific jurisdictional areas.

As such, common justice and each area of specialized justice has its own superior court, who are the courts of highest jurisdiction under the Supreme Federal Court (STF). There are currently four superior courts:

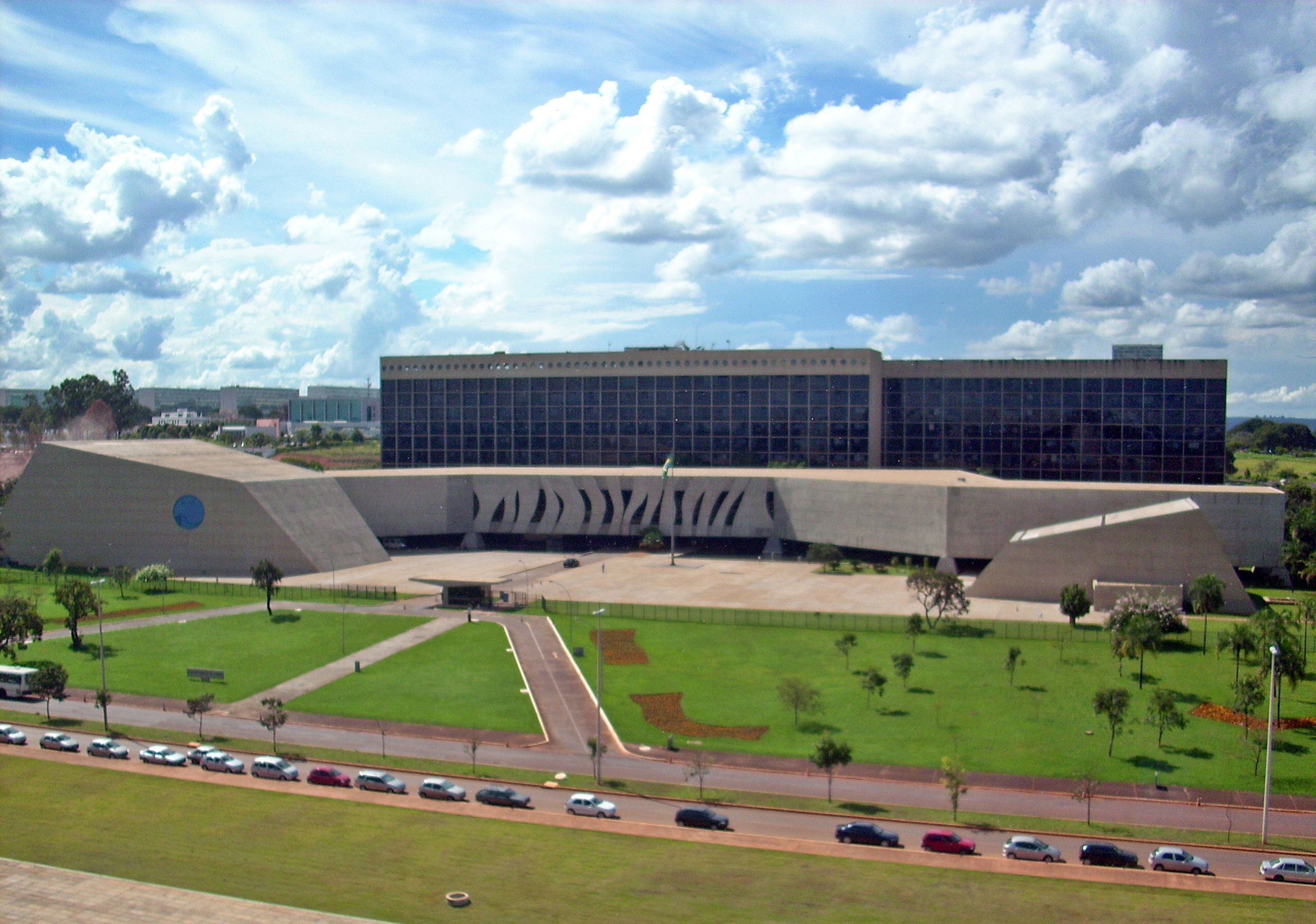
STJ

TSE

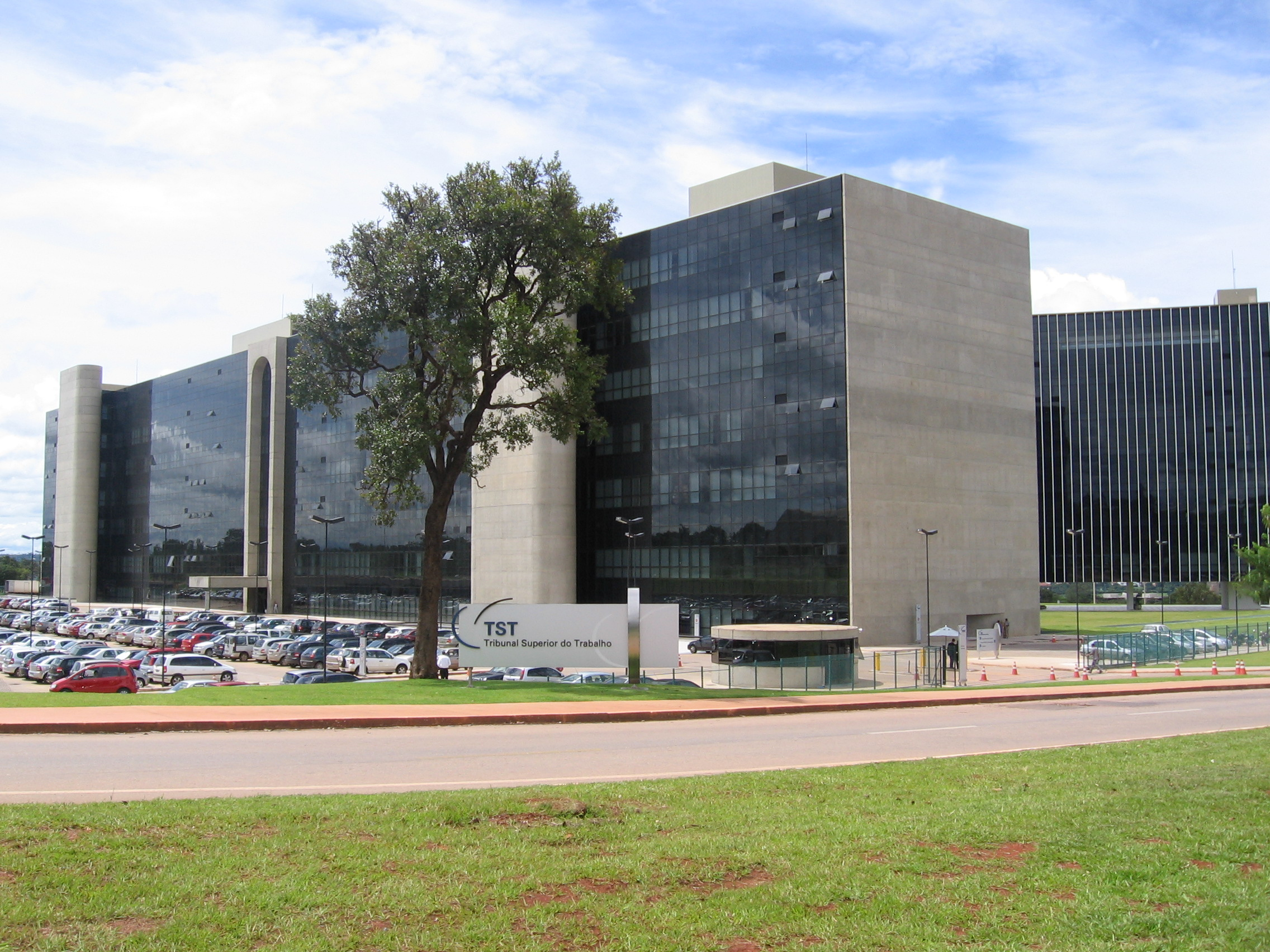
TST

STM

Seats of the Superior Courts.
- Superior Court of Justice (STJ): The highest Brazilian court for non-constitutional issues concerning both states and Federal ordinary courts, dealing mainly with matters of Common Justice. Its responsibility is to standardize the interpretation of federal law in the country's territory.
- Superior Electoral Court (TSE): Its jurisdiction involves the registry of political parties, the organization of electoral zones, the maintenance of its authority and its appellate jurisdiction over decisions of the Regional Electoral Courts.
- Superior Labor Court (TST): Its jurisdiction involves appeals from cases already in the Regional Labor Courts and cases regarding its own jurisdiction and the maintenance of its authority.
- Superior Military Court (TSM): Acts as an appellate court for the Councils of Justice and also for specific appeals from the second instance of the state military justice.

The Superior Courts primarily exercise appellate, supervisory, and jurisdictional functions within their respective areas. Their decisions contribute to the uniform interpretation and application of federal law and, in the case of the specialized courts, to the nationwide administration of their respective judicial systems. Except for the Superior Military Court, all superior courts have corresponding regional federal courts.

The superior courts are composed of magistrates known as Ministers, who are nominated by the President of the Republic and approved by the Federal Senate, with the exception of the Superior Electoral Court. Their nomination is governed by constitutional rules that vary according to the court concerned, but all nominees must satisfy constitutional requirements concerning nationality, age, legal qualifications, professional experience, and reputation. The Superior Electoral Court is the only superior court that does not have its own Miniters, being composed instead of magistrates drawn from the Supreme Federal Court and the Superior Court of Justice.

Under the 1946 and 1967 Constitutions, the jurisdiction currently exercised by the Superior Court of Justice was divided between the Supreme Federal Court and the defunct Federal Court of Appeals (TRF), whose members were also referred as Ministers. The 1967 Constitution, enacted under the military dictatorship, retained the existing superior courts but introduced a more centralized judicial structure. Although judicial independence was formally maintained, it was subsequently weakened by measures such as Institutional Act no. 5 (AI-5) and the 1969 Amendment, which restricted judicial guarantees and expanded the powers of the President.

=== Canada ===
Superior Courts in Canada exist at the federal, provincial and territorial levels.

The provincial and territorial superior courts of original jurisdiction are courts of general jurisdiction: all legal matters fall within their jurisdiction, unless assigned elsewhere by statute passed by the appropriate legislative authority. Their jurisdiction typically includes civil lawsuits involving contracts, torts, property, and family law. They also have jurisdiction over criminal prosecutions for indictable offences under the Criminal Code of Canada. They also hear civil appeals from decisions of the provincial and territorial "inferior" courts, as well as appeals from those courts in summary conviction matters under the Criminal Code. They also have jurisdiction of judicial review over administrative decisions by provincial or territorial government entities such as labour boards, human rights tribunals and licensing authorities.

The superior courts of appeal hear appeals from the superior courts of original jurisdiction, as well as from the inferior courts and administrative tribunals. The jurisdiction of the superior courts of appeal are entirely statutory. The details of their jurisdiction will vary depending on the laws passed by the federal government and the particular province or territory.

All judges of the superior courts are appointed by the federal government. Judges of provincial superior courts are appointed under the authority of the Constitution Act, 1867, while judges of the territorial superior courts are appointed under the authority of their respective territorial acts passed by the federal Parliament. The judges of the Federal Courts are appointed by the federal government under the authority of the Federal Courts Act.

=== Hong Kong ===
In Hong Kong, the Court of Final Appeal, the Court of Appeal and the Court of First Instance (the latter two form the High Court of Hong Kong), are all superior courts of record.

=== South Africa ===
The general superior courts of South Africa are the High Courts, the Supreme Court of Appeal and the Constitutional Court.

The High Courts are courts of first instance with general jurisdiction; they can hear all cases except those where exclusive jurisdiction is granted by law to another court. Most cases are, however, tried in the magistrates' courts or other lower courts, and appeals from these courts are heard by the High Court.

The Supreme Court of Appeal is solely an appellate court, hearing appeals from the High Courts. The Constitutional Court is primarily an appellate court, hearing appeals on constitutional matters from the Supreme Court of Appeal or in some cases directly from the High Courts. The Constitutional Court also occasionally acts as a court of first instance in certain cases involving the constitutionality of laws and government actions.

There are also specialist superior courts with exclusive jurisdiction over certain matters; these include the Labour Court, the Labour Appeal Court, the Electoral Court and the Land Claims Court.

=== United Kingdom ===
The Supreme Court of the United Kingdom, the Court of Appeal of England and Wales, the High Court of England and Wales, and the Crown Court of England and Wales are all superior courts of record.

=== United States ===
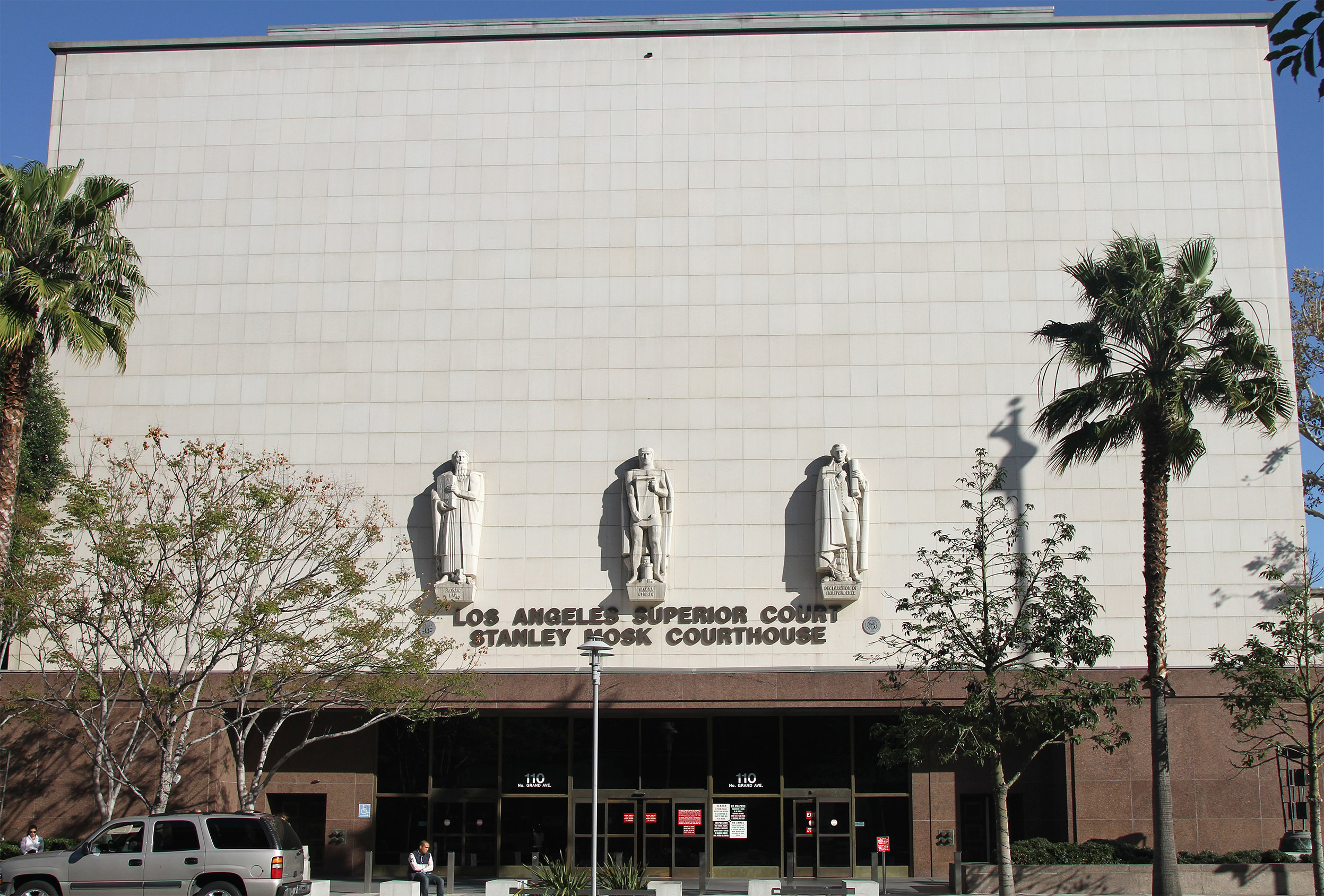
One of the Los Angeles Superior Courthouses in downtown Los Angeles

In a number of jurisdictions in the United States, the Superior Court is a state trial court of general jurisdiction with power to hear and decide any civil or criminal action which is not specially designated to be heard in some other courts. California, Connecticut, Washington, Maine, the District of Columbia, and Georgia are all examples of such jurisdictions. In other states, equivalent courts are also known as courts of common pleas (Pennsylvania, Ohio, and others), circuit courts (Illinois, Michigan, Oregon and others), district courts (Hawaii, Louisiana, Texas, Utah, and others) or, in the case of New York, the Supreme Court.

The term "superior court" raises the obvious question of superior to what. Formerly, many jurisdictions had inferior trial courts of limited jurisdiction such as municipal courts, traffic courts, and justice of the peace courts, so it was natural to call the next level of courts "superior." However, some states, like California, have unified their court systems. In California, all lower courts were absorbed into the Superior Courts of California after 1998. The lower courts now exist only as mere administrative subdivisions of the superior courts. The superior courts are legally no longer superior to any other trial courts. Thus, the term "superior court" persists in California only as a matter of tradition. Similarly, the Superior Court of the District of Columbia is the sole local trial court, and what would be inferior courts are divisions of that court, but, as a trial court, may hear appeals from administrative agencies such as the appeals board of the Department of Motor Vehicles or of the Department of Public Works.

In Pennsylvania, the Superior Court is an appellate court, hearing appeals of criminal cases and private civil cases from the Pennsylvania courts of common pleas. In New Jersey, the Superior Court comprises the Law Division and Chancery Division (trial courts of general jurisdiction, hearing cases at law and in equity respectively, with cases assigned to different parts of each court by legislation and court rule), and an Appellate Division that hears appeals from the other two parts. The Criminal Part of the Law Division and the Family Part of the Chancery Division of the Superior Court also hear appeals from the New Jersey municipal courts, courts with limited jurisdiction to hear lower-order criminal cases and to grant temporary restraining orders in domestic-violence cases. In Maine, the Superior Court is both a trial court of general jurisdiction and an appellate court that considers appeals from the Maine District Court in certain types of cases, as well as appeals from most state and municipal agencies.

== In popular culture ==
- Superior Court was a popular American daytime television program in the 1980s.

== See also ==
- Judiciary
- Judiciary of Australia
- Ordinary court
- Small claims court
- Superior Court of Justice
- Supreme court
- United States District Court
