= Public administration in South Africa =

Public administration in South Africa provides for the management of state resources.

== Chapter Ten of the Constitution ==
The Constitution outlines 9 principles by which public administration should function.

=== Public Service Commission ===
The Constitution establishes the Public Service Commission as the custodian of professionalism within the Public Service.

== Criticism ==
The Department of Justice and Constitutional Development has suggested that whistleblowers should gain access to legal assistance and that there should be a fund for those who face financial difficulty as a consequence.

Despite the constitution including a developmental principle, universities in South Africa have been criticised for not teaching public administration with this principle.

The Government's early retirement policies have been criticised for just encouraging skilled experienced people to leave while maintaining their

The policy of "cadre deployment" of the African National Congress has been criticised for damaging the independence of the civil service commission.
