= SCJ =

SCJ may refer to:

- Justice of the Supreme Court of the United Kingdom
- Sacré-Coeur de Jésus (Sacred Heart of Jesus), which is used by two Catholic orders:
  - Congregation of the Sacred Heart of Jesus, also known as Timon David fathers after their founder (Joseph-Marie Timon-David in 1852)
  - Priests of the Sacred Heart, founded by Leon Dehon in 1878
- Science Council of Japan
- SCJ: The Sydney Cinema Journal, an Australian journal, published 1966–1968 by Ken Quinnell and Michael Thornhill
- S. C. Johnson & Son, an American consumer goods manufacturer
- Shincheonji Church of Jesus the Temple of the Tabernacle of the Testimony which is a religious group in South Korea founded by Lee Man-hee
- Sixteenth Century Journal
- Society for Collegiate Journalists
- Squamocolumnar junction, part of the cervix
- Sterno-Clavicular Joint
- Superior Court of Justice (disambiguation), various entities
- Super Cobra Jet, a high-performance engine designation of the Ford FE engine
