= Hoffmann v South African Airways =

South African legal case

- Court: Constitutional Court of South Africa
- Full case name: Hoffmann v South African Airways
- Decided: 28 September 2000
- Docket nos.: CCT 17/00
- Citations: [2000] ZACC 17; 2001 (1) SA 1; 2000 (11) BCLR 1211; [2000] 12 BLLR 1365 (CC)

Case history
- Appealed from: Hoffmann v South African Airways 2000 2 SA 628 (W) in the High Court of South Africa, Witwatersrand Local Division

Court membership
- Judges sitting: Chaskalson P, Langa DP, Ackermann J, Goldstone J, Kriegler J, Mokgoro J, Ngcobo J, O’Regan J, Sachs J, Yacoob J and Madlanga AJ

Case opinions
- Decision by: Ngcobo J (unanimous)

Hoffmann v South African Airways is a decision of the Constitutional Court of South Africa in the area of South African labour law and constitutional law. It concerned employment discrimination on the basis of HIV status and was decided on 28 September 2000.

In a unanimous judgment written by Sandile Ngcobo, the Constitutional Court found that South African Airways had violated the Constitution in refusing employment to the applicant on the grounds that he was HIV-positive. Such a practice constituted unfair discrimination and violated the applicant's constitutional right to equality. In an unusual step, the court ordered South African Airways to employ the applicant.

== Background ==
In September 1996, Jacques Hoffmann applied for employment as a cabin attendant with South African Airways (SAA), the national airline. After a four-stage screening process, he was selected as a suitable candidate. However, a pre-employment medical examination found that he was HIV-positive. His medical report designated him as "unsuitable" for the role on this basis and he was not employed.

It was common cause among the disputants that Hoffmann was denied employment because of his HIV status. SAA asserted that it was its regular employment practice not to employ HIV-positive persons as cabin attendants, just as it did not employ blind or epileptic cabinet attendants. It advanced several reasons for this, based primarily on the requirement that flight crew had to be fit for worldwide duty – and therefore should be able to take the yellow fever vaccine without an adverse reaction, for example, and should not be prone to contracting opportunistic diseases. Moreover, the life expectancy of HIV-positive persons was too short to warrant the costs of training them as cabinet attendants.

== High Court action ==
Hoffmann nonetheless sued in the High Court of South Africa, alleging that SAA's refusal to employ him constituted unfair discrimination in violation of his constitutional rights. The Witwatersrand Local Division denied his application, finding that SAA's practice was "based on considerations of medical, safety and operational grounds" and "aimed at achieving a worthy and important societal goal". Moreover, it served SAA's commercial interests.

Hoffman appealed to the Constitutional Court of South Africa, where he was represented by Wim Trengove, instructed by the Legal Resources Centre. The AIDS Law Project was admitted as amicus curiae in support of Hoffmann's appeal, and the matter was heard on 18 August 2000. Judgment was handed down on 28 September 2000.

== Judgment ==
Writing on behalf of a unanimous court, Justice Sandile Ngcobo found that SAA's employment practice was not justified on any medical or commercial grounds. Indeed, he pointed out that SAA's own medical expert, Barry Schoub, had told the High Court that SAA's concerns were only applicable in the case of immunosuppressed HIV-positive persons with CD4+ counts below 300 cells per microlitre. In this regard, SAA's own medical examination of Hoffmann had found nothing "to indicate that the infection has reached either the asymptomatic immunosuppressed state or the AIDS stage". Confronted with this evidence during the hearings, SAA had conceded that its employment practice could not be justified on medical grounds and that it had therefore acted unfairly in refusing to employ Hoffmann.

The question before the court was therefore whether SAA's unfair conduct had violated any of Hoffmann's constitutional rights. The court answered in the affirmative, finding that it constituted unfair discrimination in violation of the right to equality guaranteed by section 9 of the Constitution. Having established this, Ngcobo found that it was not necessary to consider Hoffmann's further contention that the conduct also violated his constitutional right to dignity and fair labour practice, nor to consider his contention that HIV-positive status constituted a disability for the purposes of section 9(3) of the Constitution.

The court therefore upheld Hoffmann's appeal with costs. It set aside SAA's decision not to employ Hoffmann as a cabin attendant and ordered SAA to offer to employ Hoffmann as a cabinet attendant within 30 days.

== Significance ==
Ngcobo's judgment was regarded as significant not only for its "judicial activism", but also for its introduction of "instatement" as a constitutional remedy. Analogous to reinstatement, an established remedy in labour law for unfair dismissal, Ngcobo prescribed instatement as a means of establishing redress and restoring the status quo ante in situations of wrongfully denied employment. Other courts, including the Labour Court, subsequently applied instatement as a remedy for unfair labour practices.
