= Burger King South Africa =

South African fast food franchise

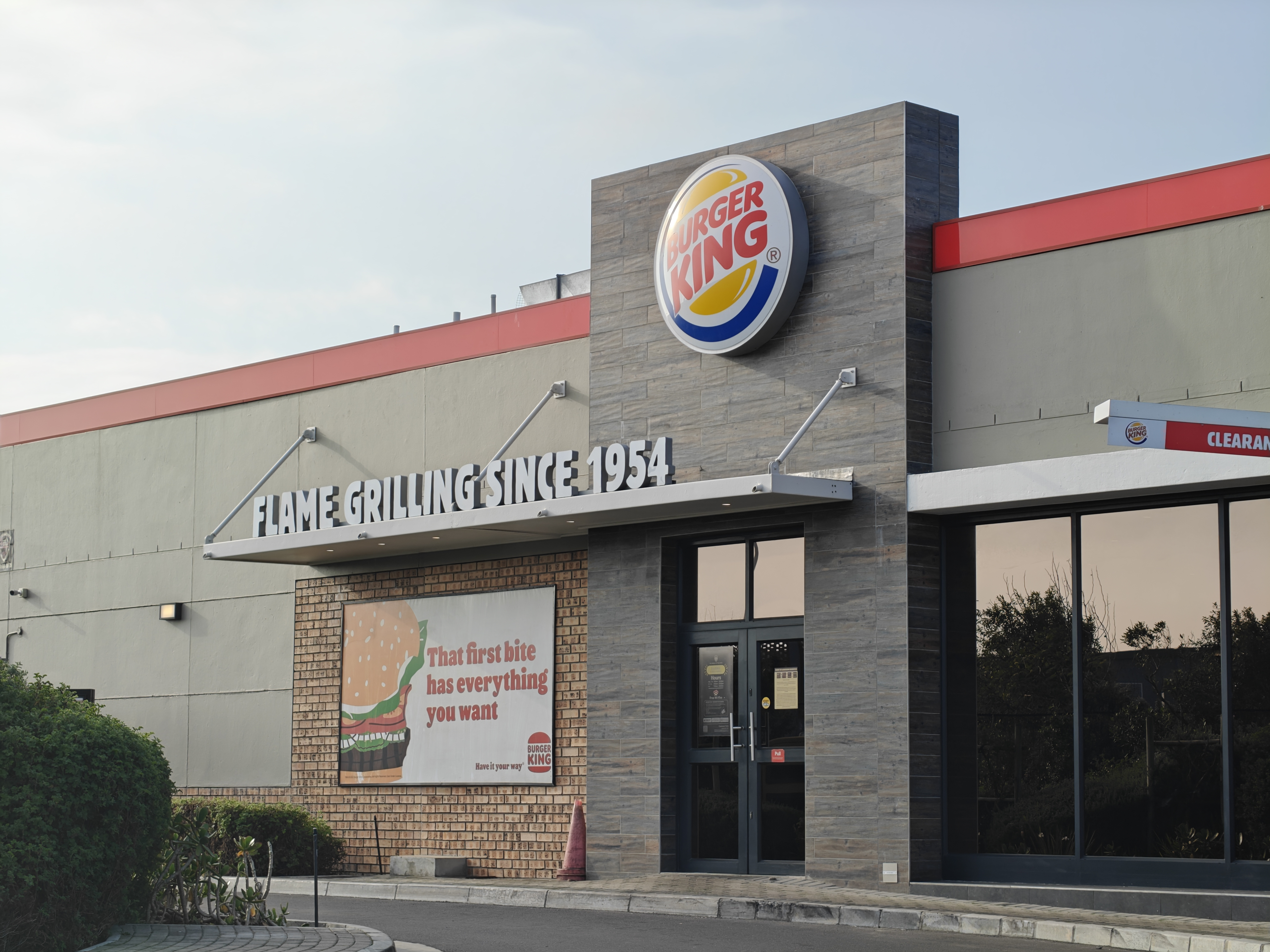
- Milnerton, Cape Town location
- Type: Master franchise
- Industry: Restaurant
- Founded: 2013; 13 years ago
- Headquarters: Cape Town, South Africa
- Number of locations: 100+ (2026)
- Area served: South Africa
- Products: Fast food
- Owner: ECP Africa Fund
- Website: burgerking.co.za

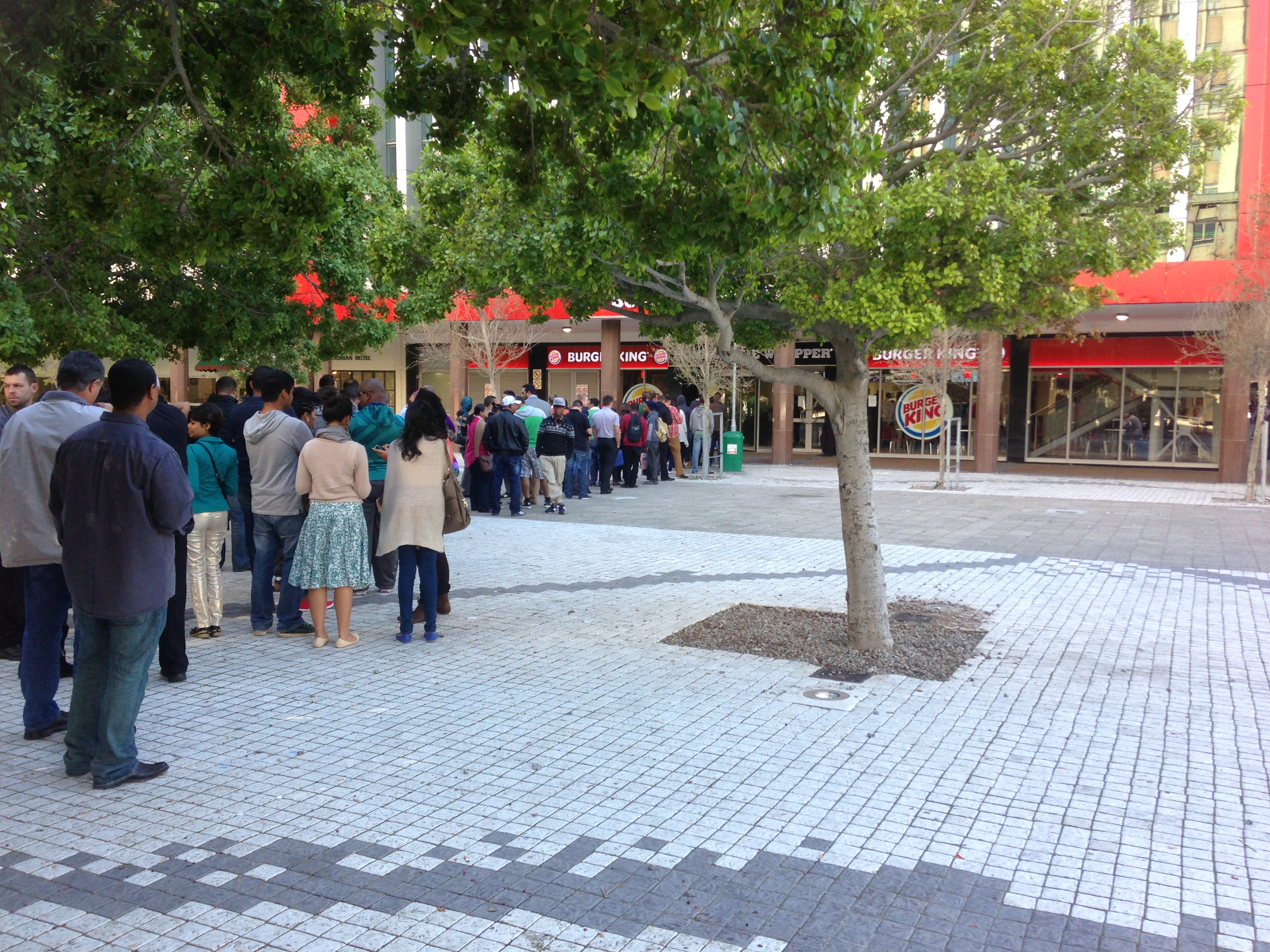
The line outside the Heerengracht Street, Cape Town Burger King on opening day, 13 May 2013

Burger King South Africa (BKSA) is a South African fast food franchise, and the local operating entity of American restaurant chain Burger King. Founded in 2013, the company is headquartered in Cape Town.

As of 2026, the company operates over 100 outlets throughout South Africa. As a master franchise, BKSA is owned by a single entity, which holds the rights to operate all BK franchises in South Africa.

== History ==
In 2012, a joint venture between Grand Parade Investments and Burger King Worldwide was announced. Burger King officially entered the South African market in May 2013. Its first outlet was located in Cape Town's Foreshore area. BK was a much more recent entrant into the South African fast food sector, in the context of competitors such as Steers, founded in the 1960s, KFC South Africa, which began in 1971, Nando's, founded in 1987, and McDonald's South Africa, established in 1995.

At its foundation, 8% of the BKSA franchise was owned by JSE Limited-listed Grand Parade Investments, with the US company holding the remaining 92% of shares.

BKSA opened its first stores in Johannesburg in February 2014, almost a year after the first store opened in Cape Town.

In October 2021, the South African Competition Tribunal approved, with conditions, the acquisition of Burger King SA by ECP Africa Fund. The original deal would have reduced black ownership from 68% to 0%, and resulted in criticism from SA's business community. Subsequently, the proposed merger was blocked outright by the Tribunal, on public interest grounds. The deal was subsequently reworked before it was approved. Its value was R697 million.

In July 2024, it was reported that, according to Eighty20 market research, Burger King was SA's sixth most popular fast food chain in terms of total customer numbers. In September of the same year, it was reported that BKSA was ranked 12th in terms of total number of outlets, in the South African fast food sector.

== Operations ==
As of 2026, BKSA operates over 100 locations across South Africa.
