= John Trengove (judge) =

South African lawyer and judge (1919–2020)

Judge of the Supreme Court
- In office 1978–1986
- Division: Appellate Division
- In office 1967–1978
- Division: Transvaal Provincial Division

Personal details
- Born: John James Trengove; 3 October 1919 Stellenbosch, Cape Province; Union of South Africa
- Died: 5 July 2020 (aged 100) Somerset West, Western Cape, South Africa
- Spouse: Izabel Trengove
- Children: 4, including Wim
- Education: Stellenbosch Boys' High School
- Alma mater: University of Pretoria

John James Trengove (3 October 1919 – 5 July 2020) was a South African lawyer and judge who served in the Supreme Court of South Africa from 1967 until his retirement in 1986. He joined the bench in the Transvaal Provincial Division in 1967 and was elevated to the Appellate Division in 1978. Before his judicial appointment, he was a practising silk in Pretoria. He was an acting judge in the Constitutional Court of South Africa in 1995.

== Early life and career ==
Trengove was born on 3 October 1919 in Stellenbosch. He matriculated at Stellenbosch Boys' High School in 1936 and attended the University of Pretoria, where he completed a BA cum laude in 1944 and an LLB cum laude in 1946. Thereafter he practised as an advocate in Pretoria from 1946 to 1966, taking silk in 1960 and serving as chairman of the Pretoria Bar Council in 1966. He was a junior prosecutor in the Treason Trial.

== Judicial career: 1967–1986 ==
In 1967, Trengove joined the bench of the Supreme Court of South Africa as a judge of the Transvaal Provincial Division. He served in that division for over a decade and was elevated to the Appellate Division in 1978.

== Retirement ==
He took early retirement at the end of 1986. However, during his retirement, he served stints as an acting judge in the Lesotho Court of Appeal, Swaziland Court of Appeal, High Court of Botswana, and High Court of Namibia. He was also an acting judge in the post-apartheid Constitutional Court of South Africa for one term in 1995. Most prominently, he was the inaugural Inspecting Judge at the Judicial Inspectorate for Correctional Services, which was established in June 1998.

== Personal life ==
He was married to Izabel Trengove (née Erasmus). They had four children, one of whom is prominent silk Wim Trengove.
