= Department of Employment and Labour =

Department of the South African government responsible for matters related to employment

Department of Labour
- List: 10 other official names: Departement van Arbeid (Afrikaans); umNyango wezabaSebenzi (Southern Ndebele); iSebe lezaBasebenzi (Xhosa); uMnyango Wezabasebenzi (Zulu); Litiko Letetisebenti (Swazi); Kgoro ya Bašomi (Northern Sotho); Lefapha la tsa Mesebetsi (Sotho); Lefapha la Bodiri (Tswana); Ndzawulo ya Vatirhi (Tsonga); Muhasho wa Mishumo (Venda)

Department overview
- Type: Department
- Jurisdiction: Government of South Africa
- Headquarters: 25°44′59″S 28°11′20″E
- Employees: 3,490 (2010/11)
- Annual budget: R 4.58 billion (2026/27)
- Minister responsible: Thembelani Thulas Nxesi, Minister of Employment and Labour
- Deputy Minister responsible: Boitumelo Moloi, Deputy Minister of Employment and Labour
- Department executive: Mr. Thobile Lamati, Director-General: Labour
- Child agencies: Advisory Council for Occupational Health and Safety; Commission for Conciliation, Mediation and Arbitration; Commission for Employment Equity; Compensation Board; Employment Conditions Commission; National Economic Development and Labour Council; Productivity South Africa; Unemployment Insurance Fund; Supported Employment Enterprises (SEE)
- Key documents: Labour Relations Act, 1995; Basic Conditions of Employment Act, 1997; Employment Equity Act, 1998; Unemployment Insurance Act, 1996; Occupational Health and Safety Act, 1993; Compensation for Occupational Injuries and Diseases Act, National Minimum Wage Act, Employment Services Act,
- Website: www.labour.gov.za

The Department of Employment and Labour is the department of the South African government responsible for matters related to employment, including industrial relations, job creation, unemployment insurance and occupational health and safety. Through a range of initiatives developed in collaboration with social partners, the Department of Employment and Labour makes a substantial contribution to the decline in inequality, poverty, and unemployment. These programs aim to reduce workplace poverty, promote positive labor relations, increase economic efficiency and productivity, eliminate workplace discrimination and inequality.

As of 3 July 2024 the Minister of Employment and Labour is Nomakhosazana Meth. In the 2011/12 budget the department had a budget of R1,981 million and a staff complement of 3,490 civil servants.

== History ==
Prior to the creation of the Department of Labour in 1924, labour issues in the country were the responsibility of the Department of Mines and in that year, the latter was stripped of the function and given to the new department. In April 1935 the department was renamed the Department of Labour and Social Welfare. Then on 1 October 1937, its original name was reused as the Department of Labour and a new department created for the other, the Department of Social Welfare.

== Online services ==
The Department offers several online services to the employers and employees of South Africa:

- The South Africa Labour Market Information System

An online platform which allows you to search through the use of keywords for statistics on the South African labour market. This includes information about age group, working hours, marital status, highest level of education, population group, occupation and economic activity.

- ROE Online

The platform allows employers to register with the Compensation Fund (also known as COIDA or Workmens Compensation). Employers are required by The Compensation for Occupational Injuries and Diseases Act (COIDA) No. 130 of 1993 to register their business with the aforesaid where they have one or more employees. Employers will pay an annual assessment fee upon registration calculated in accordance with their business classification and annual payroll.
