= Competition Appeal Court =

Specialist appellate court in South Africa

- Established: 1998; 28 years ago
- Location: Cape Town, South Africa
- Composition method: Executive selection
- Authorised by: The Competition Act, 1998
- Appeals to: Constitutional Court
- Appeals from: Competition Tribunal
- Judge term length: Indefinite
- Number of positions: Minimum of 3 judges
- Website: cac.org.za

Judge President
- Currently: Norman Manoim
- Since: 1 December 2022

The Competition Appeal Court is a specialist South African court that hears appeals from the Competition Tribunal. The court was established by the Competition Act 89 of 1998, and has national jurisdiction in matters of South African competition law.

Judges of the Competition Appeal Court are judges of the High Court of South Africa and are appointed by the President of South Africa on the advice of the Judicial Service Commission.

== Status and composition ==
The Competition Appeal Court was established as a court of record by Section 36 of the Competition Act, which gives it a "status similar to that of a High Court". It is sometimes considered to be a special division of the High Court.

The bench is appointed for a fixed term by the President of South Africa on the advice of the Judicial Service Commission. At least three members must be judges of the High Court, and one of those three must be designated as the Judge President of the Competition Appeal Court.

After consulting the Judge President of the Competition Appeal Court, the Minister of Justice may elect to second any number of High Court judges to serve as acting judges of the Competition Appeal Court. Judges lose their status in the Competition Appeal Court if they cease to be judges of the High Court.

== Functions ==
The Competition Appeal Court is one of three competition authorities tasked with enforcing South African competition law; the others are the Competition Commission and Competition Tribunal.

The court has the power to consider any appeal or review of any decision of the Competition Tribunal. It is also required to confirm any order made by the Competition Tribunal for the divestiture of assets by parties who contravened Section 8 of the Competition Act.

== Jurisdiction ==
In terms of the Competition Act, the Competition Appeal Court has jurisdiction throughout South Africa. In addition, the Competition Tribunal and Competition Appeal Court have exclusive jurisdiction to adjudicate matters involving conduct prohibited by the Competition Act.

Dennis Davis, the former Judge President of the Competition Appeal Court, argues that this exclusive jurisdiction should be preserved, given the complex nature of competition law and the technical economic knowledge required for its interpretation.

Orders of the Competition Appeal Court may be appealed in South Africa's apex court, the Constitutional Court. However, the precise extent and nature of the Constitutional Court's jurisdiction over competition law matters remain unclear. There was formerly an intermediate right of appeal to the Supreme Court of Appeal, but that right was extinguished in 2013 by the Seventeenth Amendment of the Constitution of South Africa.

== Structure ==
=== Former judges president ===
- Dennis Davis

=== Notable former judges ===
- Nambitha Dambuza
- Nolwazi Mabindla-Boqwana
- Owen Rogers
- Dumisani Zondi
- Mbuyiseli Madlanga

== See also ==
- Labour Appeal Court
- Electoral Court
- Superior Courts Act, 2013
