= Lulama Ngcukayitobi =

South African politician

Provincial Secretary of the Eastern Cape African National Congress
- Incumbent
- Assumed office 1 October 2017
- Deputy: Helen Sauls-August
- Chairperson: Oscar Mabuyane

Personal details
- Born: December 1972 (age 53)
- Party: African National Congress
- Relations: Tembeka Ngcukaitobi (brother)

Lulama Ngcukayitobi (born December 1972) is a South African politician from the Eastern Cape. He has been the provincial secretary of the African National Congress (ANC) in the Eastern Cape since October 2017.

== Tenure as provincial secretary ==
Ngcukayitobi was elected as ANC provincial secretary on 1 October 2017 during a chaotic party conference that became infamous as the "festival of chairs"; his election was unopposed after the other candidate, Andile Lungisa, became indisposed during the chaos. He was re-elected in May 2022, receiving 807 votes against the 667 cast for Teris Ntutu. He ran on the slate of provincial chairperson Oscar Mabuyane.

In June 2024, in the aftermath of the recent general election, Ngcukayitobi announced and then rescinded his resignation from the party leadership. The Sunday Times reported that he had been opposed to the ANC's participation in a national coalition with the Democratic Alliance, but that ANC leaders Gwede Mantashe and Fikile Mbalula had persuaded him to stay on.

He is considered a possible candidate to succeed Mabuyane as provincial chairperson in 2026.

== Personal life ==
Ngcukayitobi was born in December 1972. He is from a prominent family in Cala, Eastern Cape; his brother, Tembeka Ngcukaitobi, is a prominent lawyer. Their mother, Nomsa, was a domestic worker, a teacher at a school for the disabled, and then a nurse, and their father, Gcinabantu Hutchinson, was a mineworker in Johannesburg and then a clerk at the Magistrate's Court in Cofimvaba. Ngcukayitobi launched the Gcinabantu Hutchison Ngcukayitobi Foundation in Cala in December 2022.
