= Kruger v President of the Republic of South Africa =

South African legal case

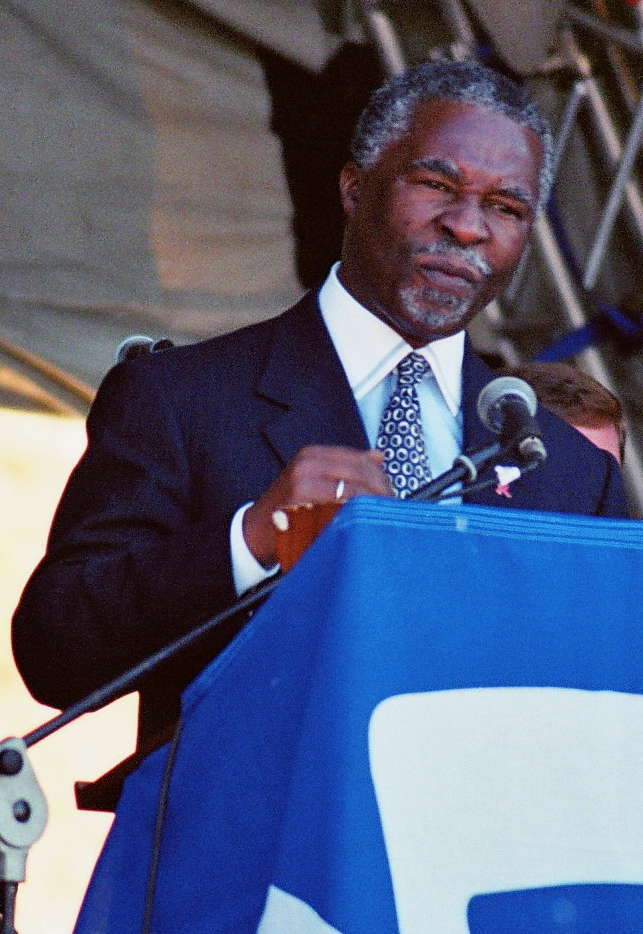
Thabo Mbeki, President of the Republic of South Africa, brought prematurely into operation certain provisions of the Road Accident Fund Amendment Act.

Kruger v President of the Republic of South Africa and Others is an important case in South African law, heard in the Constitutional Court (CC) on 19 February 2008, with judgment handed down on 2 October. The judges were Langa CJ, O'Regan ADCJ, Madala J, Mokgoro J, Ngcobo J, Nkabinde J, Skweyiya J (who composed the majority judgment), Van Der Westhuizen J, Yacoob J, Jafta AJ and Kroon AJ. Counsel for the applicant was Geoff Budlender. There was no appearance for the first respondent, but Wim Trengove SC (with A. Cockerell) appeared for the second and (with S. Budlender) for the third respondent. The applicant's attorneys were Kruger & Co.; the State Attorney represented the second respondent, while the third respondent's attorneys were Brugmans Inc.

The first question was one of constitutional practice: specifically the requirements for direct access to the Constitutional Court, in order to challenge the constitutionality of legislation. For that purpose, an expanded definition was adopted of the phrase "direct and personal interest." If the party in question has a direct and personal interest (on this definition) where the legislation in question is

1. of direct and central importance to the field in which he or she operates; and
2. in interests of the administration of justice,

the court will be required to determine the validity of the legislation.

Central to the case was an amendment to the Road Accident Fund. The implementation of the amending legislation was to be staggered by the issuance of a presidential proclamation putting into effect certain amending sections before others. When the President executed on this requirement, however, he selected sections comprising an arbitrary assortment of both administrative and substantive amendments contained in the amending Act. His proclamation, therefore, was on face of it irrational, and the doctrine of objective invalidity rendered it void ab initio. Furthermore, the proclamation issued to correct the errors in the first proclamation was also void.

The court thus considered also the power of the State President to issue a proclamation correcting an error made in an earlier proclamation. Although the court found that the President was empowered to withdraw the offending proclamation, it held that he may not amend a proclamation issued in error where the original proclamation was void ab initio.

== Facts ==
Kruger, the applicant, an attorney specialising in personal injury law, approached the CC under section 172(2)(a) of the Constitution for confirmation of a High Court order declaring Proclamation R27 of 2006 (issued by President Thabo Mbeki (the first respondent) in terms of section 13 of the Road Accident Fund Amendment Act, and purporting to bring into operation sections 4, 6, 10, 11 and 12 of the Amendment Act, with effect from 31 July 2006) to be "null and void and of no force and effect."

Because of the alleged uncertainty created by the High Court's declaration of invalidity, the Road Accident Fund (the third respondent) sought direct access to the CC for an order declaring Proclamation R32 of 2006, issued by the President in substitution for the first proclamation, before 31 July 2006, to have brought lawfully into operation sections 1, 2, 3, 4 and 5 of the Amendment Act with effect from 31 July 2006.

The second proclamation had been issued to correct a bona fide error in the first proclamation regarding which of the sections in the Amendment Act were to come into operation on 31 July, and was worded as "amending" the first proclamation. The first and second respondents objected in limine that the applicant had no locus standi to bring the application.

== Judgment ==
As to the applicant's standing to bring the application, the court held that, although he might not have had standing at common law, the present case called for an expanded understanding of what constituted a "direct and personal interest." If the practitioner was able to establish both

- that a proclamation was of direct and central importance to the field in which he or she operated; and
- that it was in the interests of the administration of justice that the validity of that proclamation be determined by a court,

then he or she could approach a court to challenge the validity of the proclamation.

In the present case, the court found, the applicant met both requirements and accordingly had standing to pursue the application.

As to the application for direct access, the court found that it had a discretion on whether or not to grant direct access, but it would only do so in exceptional cases and when it was in the interests of justice in the light of the facts of the particular case. The circumstances in the application for direct access were indeed, in the present case, exceptional. It was in the interests of justice, too, that the validity of the two proclamations be considered together.

As to the validity of the first proclamation, the court held that section 4, listed in both the first and the second proclamation, belonged to the cluster of the administrative amendments which were listed in the second proclamation. The effect of the first proclamation was literally to put into operation an arbitrary selection of one of the administrative amendments (section 4) and four of the substantive amendments (sections 6, 10, 11 and 12) made by the Amendment Act. Because it was based on an arbitrary selection, it followed that the first proclamation was objectively irrational. Under the doctrine of objective invalidity, the first proclamation was a nullity from the outset. It was invalid and void ab initio, and therefore had no effect in law. Furthermore, if the first proclamation remained in effect, it would create a number of legal and practical problems.

As to the validity of the second proclamation, the court held that section 13 of the Amendment Act, read with section 81 of the Constitution, conferred the narrow power on the President to issue a proclamation determining the date on which legislation would come into operation. Properly construed, those provisions necessarily implied a power to withdraw a proclamation issued in error, if the withdrawal was executed before the relevant legislation came into force. The power to withdraw accorded with the nature of the power to issue and publish proclamations, the lawful exercise of which power would not be harmful to the rule of law. The President did not, however, have the power to amend a proclamation issued in error where the original proclamation was void from its commencement, as in the case of the second proclamation. A nullity could not be amended but could, of course, be withdrawn.

The court held further that the President could, on the facts of the present case, have lawfully withdrawn the first proclamation once he realised his mistake, as long as he did so in unambiguous terms, and before 31 July. That was not, however, what had happened: The President had issued the second proclamation in which he purported to "amend" the invalid first proclamation. The President did not have the power to amend a nullity. Moreover, the second proclamation did not withdraw the first proclamation; nor, on the face of it, could the legal position with regard to the Amendment Act be determined. No commencement date was to be found in the text of the second proclamation. One had to rely on the doctrine of incorporation by reference and consider the text of the void first proclamation to give the second proclamation meaning. The second proclamation was thus unclear, inconsistent with the rule of law and invalid.

In framing an order that was just and equitable, cognisance had to be taken of the fact that Minister of Transport Jeff Radebe (the second respondent, who also signed the proclamations, as required), together with the Fund, the courts and the claimants, had since 31 July 2006, operated on the understanding that sections 1 to 5 of the Amendment Act were in operation, and that a finding to the contrary would be devastating to all concerned. The court made, accordingly, the following order:

- The application for leave to appeal had to be granted;
- the High-Court order was invalid with effect from 31 July 2006;
- Proclamation R32 of 2006 was invalid with effect from 31 July 2006;
- the President had to issue a proclamation bringing sections 1 to 5 of the Road Accident Fund Amendment Act into operation, with effect from 31 July 2006, within thirty days;
- the Fund could continue to act for thirty days from the date of the order as if section 1 to 5 of the Amendment Act had been brought into force on 31 July 2006;
- everything that had been done by the Fund since 31 July 2006 on the basis that sections 1 to 5 had been brought into force would
  - not be invalid on the ground that the first and second proclamations had been declared to be invalid; and
  - be deemed valid as if sections 1 to 5 of the Amendment Act had been lawfully brought into force on 31 July 2006.

== See also ==
- Constitutional law
- Constitution of South Africa
- Law of South Africa
