= Judiciary of South Africa =

Overview of the judicial branch of the South African government

The Judiciary
- Seal

- Judiciary flag

Agency overview
- Formed: 1909 Constitution - 1909; 117 years ago; 1996 Constitution - 1996; 30 years ago
- Jurisdiction: Government of South Africa
- Headquarters: 188, 14th Road, Noordwyk, Midrand
- Agency executive: Mandisa Maya, Chief Justice of the Republic of South Africa
- Key documents: Chapter 8 of the Constitution; Judicial Service Commission Act, 1994
- Website: judiciary.org.za

The judiciary of South Africa is the body of judges and magistrates who sit in the courts of South Africa. The judiciary is an independent branch of the government, subject only to the Constitution of South Africa and the laws of the country. The Judiciary interprets the law of South Africa, using as the basis of its interpretation the laws enacted by the South African Parliament as well as explanatory statements made in the legislature during the enactment.

Chapter 8 of the Constitution of South Africa defines the structure of the South African judicial system. This chapter also guarantees the independence of the courts and requires other organs of the state to assist and protect the courts in order to ensure their "independence, impartiality, dignity, accessibility and effectiveness". In addition, Chapter 2 of the Constitution guarantees every person the right to have a dispute or trial heard by a fair, impartial and independent court.

The judiciary of South Africa consists of:

- The Chief Justice of South Africa, the Deputy Chief Justice and the other judges of the Constitutional Court
- The President, Deputy President and other judges of the Supreme Court of Appeal
- The Judge President, Deputy Judge President and other judges of each of the High Courts
- Regional and district magistrates of the Magistrates' Courts
- The judges of other courts established by Act of Parliament.

Permanent judges in the higher courts are appointed by the President of South Africa, in consultation with the Judicial Service Commission as well as the leaders of the political parties represented in South African National Assembly. The appointment of magistrates fall under the separate Magistrates' Commission.

There is also a single national prosecuting authority that is responsible for the institution of criminal proceedings on behalf of the state.

== Judicial Service Commission ==
The South African Judicial Service Commission plays an important role in the appointment of judges and also advises the country's national government on any matters relating to the judiciary and the administration of justice. It is a body established in the Constitution of South Africa "to advise the national government on any matter relating to the judiciary or the administration of justice" and for which separate legislation has been enacted.

== National Prosecuting Authority ==
The National Prosecuting Authority (NPA) is responsible for the institution of criminal proceedings on behalf of the state. The NPA is headed by the Director of Public Prosecutions, who is appointed by the President. The Constitution of South Africa states that legislation enacted by the South African Parliament must ensure that the NPA performs its functions without fear, favour or prejudice.

Schematic of the South African court system

== See also ==
- Government of South Africa
- Department of Justice and Constitutional Development
- Law of South Africa
- Courts of South Africa
