= National Economic Development and Labour Council =

South African automotive industry trade association

NEDLAC
- Established: 18 February 1995; 31 years ago
- Merger of: National Economic Forum (NEF); National Manpower Commission (NMC)
- Type: Statutory public entity
- Headquarters: Johannesburg, Gauteng, South Africa
- Region served: South Africa
- Services: Policy consultation, Social dialogue, Consensus-building, Collective bargaining facilitation, and Socio-economic policy review
- Members: 400+ stakeholders (2026)
- Official language: English
- Key people: Lisa Seftel (Executive Director); Nomakhosazana Meth (Chairperson)
- Affiliations: The Government of South Africa; Business Unity South Africa (BUSA); Various local trade unions
- Funding: Parliamentary appropriation through the Department of Employment and Labour
- Website: nedlac.org.za

The National Economic Development and Labour Council (NEDLAC) is South Africa's national economic and social council. The organization brings together government, labor, business, and community, with the goal of shaping policies that drive economic growth, social justice, and sustainable development.

The organization is required to consider all proposed labor legislation and significant changes to social and economic policy before it is implemented or introduced in Parliament.

Founded in 1995, NEDLAC is headquartered in Johannesburg, and has over 400 active stakeholders as of 2026. The organization partners with, among others, the Department of Employment and Labour, the International Labour Organization, the Presidential Climate Commission, and the Labour Research Service.

== History ==
NEDLAC was established in February 1995, as one of the first new institutions established after South Africa's first democratic elections, held in 1994.

The Council played a significant role in the establishment of SA's independent labor dispute tribunal, the CCMA, which was founded in 1995.

Over the subsequent few years, NEDLAC assessed many foundational pieces of labor legislation in South Africa, including the Labour Relations Act of 1995, the Basic Conditions of Employment Act of 1997, the Employment Equity Act of 1998, the Skills Development Act of 1998, the Unemployment Insurance Act of 2001, the Competition Amendment Bill of 2008, and 2018, the National Health Insurance Act of 2019, and the Competition Amendment Bill of 2019.

In 2019, NEDLAC played a role in the establishment of South Africa's National Minimum Wage Commission.

== Function ==
Essentially, NEDLAC aims to build consensus between government, organized labor, organized business, and the community sector, to bring about inclusive economic development.

Matters for consideration by NEDLAC are formally tabled via designated chambers. These are guided by an agreed protocol, published in NEDLAC's Protocol Document, that ensures that all parties have equal opportunity to present inputs, request further research, and propose amendments.

== Summits ==
Over the years, NEDLAC has hosted numerous important South African summits, including:

- The Presidential Job Summit in 1998
- The Financial Sector Summit in 2002
- The Growth and Development Summit in 2003
- A National Stakeholder Summit on Electricity Crises in 2008
- A Labor Relations Indaba in 2014
- The Presidential Job Summit in 2018

== Structure ==
NEDLAC is headed by an Executive Council, which contains an executive director. Its Chairperson is the South African Minister of Employment and Labour, a role currently held by Nomakhosazana Meth of the ANC.
