= Courts of South Africa =

Schematic of the South African court system

The courts of South Africa are the civil and criminal courts responsible for the administration of justice in South Africa. They apply the law of South Africa and are established under the Constitution of South Africa or under Acts of the Parliament of South Africa.

Despite South Africa's division into nine provinces, the country has a single national court system. The courts are funded and supported by the national Department of Justice and Constitutional Development. The ordinary courts are the district and regional magistrates' courts, the provincial divisions of the High Court, and the Supreme Court of Appeal. The Constitutional Court is the highest court for constitutional matters.

Specialist courts have been established for various matters, including Labour Courts, the Land Claims Court, Special Income Tax Courts, and the Electoral Court. African customary law is administered by chiefs' and headmen's courts, subject to the National House of Traditional Leaders.

== Constitutional Court ==
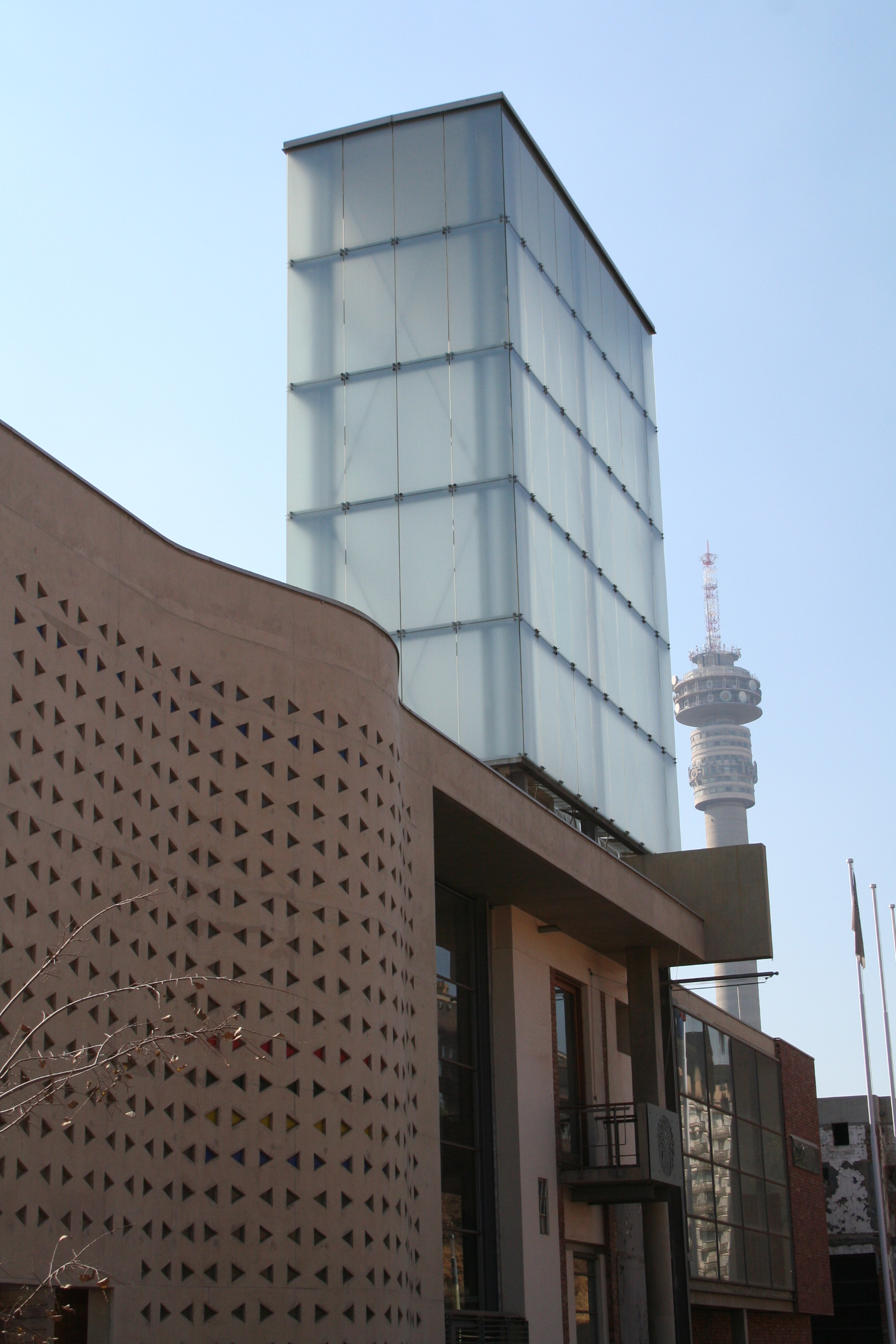
The Constitutional Court

The Constitutional Court is the final court of appeals for all matters (no longer limited to constitutional matters only), and its decisions are binding on all other courts in South Africa. It has the power to make the final decision on the constitutionality of an act of Parliament or of a provincial legislature; while a High Court or the Supreme Court of Appeals may make an order declaring an act to be unconstitutional, the order does not come into effect until the Constitutional Court confirms it.

The Constitutional Court was established by the Interim (1993) Constitution and continued under the Final (1996) Constitution. The court has eleven judges; originally the chief judge was called the President of the Constitutional Court, but that title was changed to Chief Justice of South Africa by the Sixth Amendment to the Constitution. The Constitutional Court has its seat on Constitution Hill in Johannesburg.

== Supreme Court of Appeal ==
The Supreme Court of Appeal hears only appeals from the High Court or other courts of similar status to the High Court. The court sits in Bloemfontein; the chief judge is called the President of the Supreme Court of Appeal. It has its origin in the Appellate Division of the Supreme Court of South Africa, which was established by the South Africa Act 1909 at the formation of the Union of South Africa.

== High Court ==
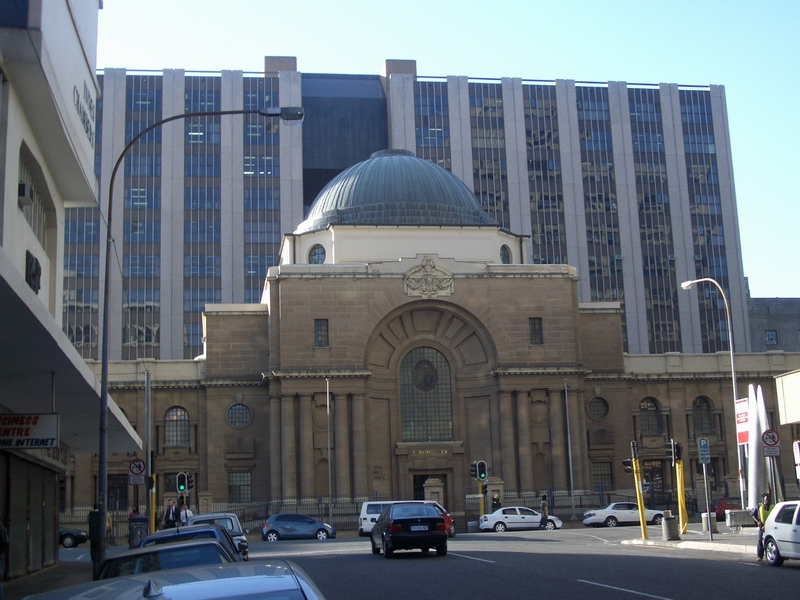
The local seat of the Gauteng Division in Johannesburg

The provincial divisions of the High Court of South Africa have general jurisdiction over their defined areas. They hear appeals from the magistrates' courts within their area, and act as a court of first instance for cases outside the jurisdiction of the magistrates' courts. The present divisions of the High Court are:

- The Eastern Cape Division at Grahamstown with local seats at Bhisho, Mthatha and Port Elizabeth
- The Free State Division at Bloemfontein
- The Gauteng Division at Pretoria with a local seat at Johannesburg
- The KwaZulu-Natal Division at Pietermaritzburg with a local seat at Durban
- The Limpopo Division at Polokwane with local seats at Thohoyandou and Lephalale
- The Mpumalanga Division at Mbombela with a local seat at Middelburg
- The North West Division at Mahikeng
- The Northern Cape Division at Kimberley
- The Western Cape Division at Cape Town

The origins of the High Court lie in the Supreme Courts of the four colonies (the Cape Colony, Transvaal Colony, Natal Colony and Orange River Colony) from which the Union of South Africa was formed; these became provincial divisions of the Supreme Court of South Africa. On receiving nominal independence the bantustans of Transkei, Bophuthatswana, Venda and Ciskei established their own Supreme Courts; when they were re-integrated into South Africa on 27 April 1994 these courts were given the same status as provincial divisions of the Supreme Court of South Africa.

The 1996 Constitution renamed the provincial and local divisions of the Supreme Court of South Africa, as well as the bantustan Supreme Courts, to High Courts. Since that time some changes have been made to rationalise the areas of jurisdiction of the courts; the courts have also been renamed in accordance with the names of the new provinces. The Superior Courts Act, 2013 restructured the High Courts into divisions of a single High Court of South Africa, and also provided for the creation of divisions for Limpopo and Mpumalanga, which had previously fallen under the jurisdiction of the Gauteng High Court at Pretoria.

The Gauteng Division of the High Court in Johannesburg includes a Commercial Court Division.

== Magistrates' courts ==
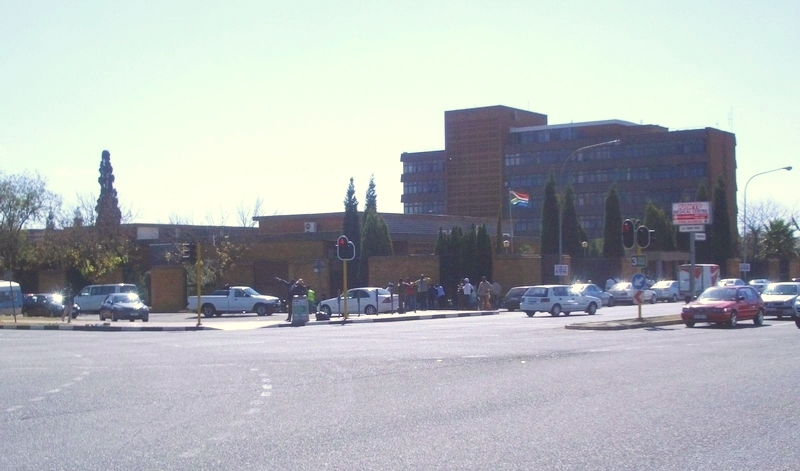
Kempton Park Magistrate's Court

South Africa is divided into approximately 350 magisterial districts; each district is served by a district magistrate's court. In criminal cases, district courts have jurisdiction over all crimes except treason, murder and rape, and can impose a sentence of no more than three years imprisonment and a fine of no more than R120,000. They can hear civil cases where the value of the claim is no more than R200,000.

The magisterial districts are grouped into regions; each region has a regional court which may sit at multiple locations. In criminal cases, regional courts have jurisdiction over all crimes except treason, and can impose a sentence of no more than fifteen years imprisonment and a fine of no more than R600,000. They can hear civil cases where the value of the claim is no more than R400,000 as well as divorce cases.

== Specialist courts ==
Parliament has established specialist courts to handle specific areas of law or types of case. In some cases these courts have exclusive jurisdiction and the matters are excluded from the jurisdiction of the High Court and the magistrates' courts.

The Labour Court, which has status similar to a High Court division, deals with labour law and the relationship between employer, employee and trade union, in particular cases arising under the Basic Conditions of Employment Act (South Africa) the Labour Relations Act and the Employment Equity Act. The Labour Appeal Court has status similar to the Supreme Court of Appeal, and hears appeals from the Labour Court. There is no further appeal except on constitutional matters, in which case appeals may be heard by the Constitutional Court.

The Land Claims Court, which has status similar to a High Court division, handles claims for restitution, or compensation in place of restitution, to people or communities dispossessed of land under racially discriminatory laws. It also deals with certain other cases involving agricultural labour tenants and other people who do not have secure rights to the land on which they live.

The Electoral Court, which has status similar to a High Court division, handles matters related to elections, and in particular appeals against decisions of the Electoral Commission.

Tax Courts handle disputes between taxpayers and the South African Revenue Service over tax assessments.

== Military courts ==
Members of the South African National Defence Force are subject to the Military Discipline Code and the jurisdiction of the military courts. Minor military offences are dealt with in a disciplinary hearing by the commanding officer, who may impose penalties like fines, confinement to barracks, or extra duty. For serious offences, SANDF members are tried in a Court of a Military Judge or a Court of a Senior Military Judge. These courts consist of a legally trained officer as judge and two officers or warrant officers as assessors. The judge decides questions of law, while the judge and assessors decide questions of fact by a majority vote. Certain offences (murder, rape, treason, culpable homicide, crimes against humanity and war crimes) may only be tried in the ordinary civilian courts.

Appeals from the military courts are to the Court of Military Appeals, which consists of a civilian judge or magistrate (or in some cases three civilian judges), a legally trained military officer, and another officer with command experience. Rulings on this court may be taken on review to the civilian High Court (and subsequently to the Supreme Court of Appeal and Constitutional Court) only on the grounds of procedural unfairness or constitutional invalidity.

== Shortage of judges ==
As of April 2025, the judiciary is experiencing a severe shortage of judges. As of January 2026, the country had approximately 250 judges for its 60 million population or about four judges per million people, which is below comparable countries (e.g. India at 15 judges per million and several European countries at over 200 per million. The shortfall led multiple cases to be delayed for years and new trials being booked for up to four years in the future.

== See also ==
- Government of South Africa
- Judiciary of South Africa
- Law of South Africa
