= Wim Trengove =

South African lawyer

Wim Trengove SC
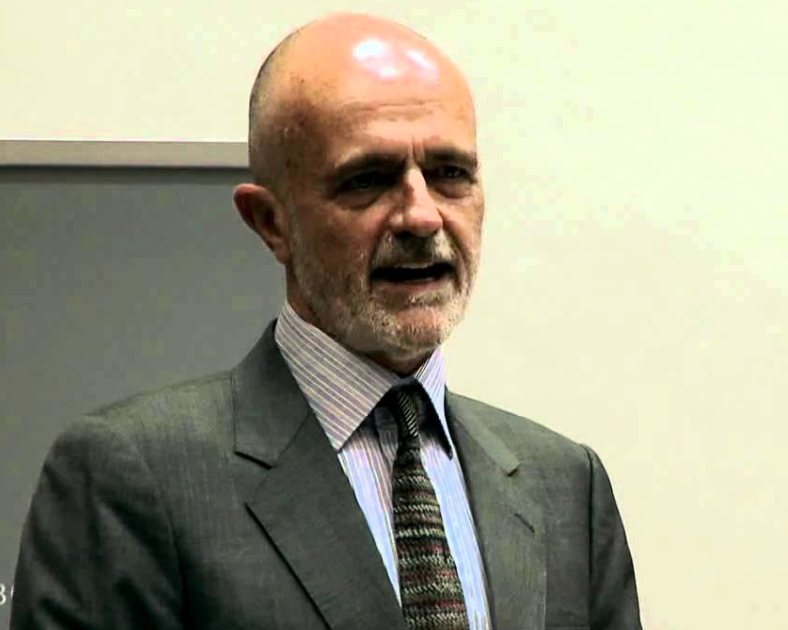
- Trengove at Stellenbosch University in 2012
- Born: 27 October 1949 (age 76)
- Education: University of Pretoria
- Occupation: Advocate
- Years active: 1975–present
- Children: 6, including John
- Father: J. J. Trengove

Wim Trengove SC (born 27 October 1949) is a South African advocate best known for his role in constitutional litigation. He has argued various administrative law, constitutional law, and human rights law matters in the Constitutional Court of South Africa, including several high-profile political cases.

== Early life and career ==
Trengove was born on 27 October 1949. His parents were liberal Afrikaans-speakers, and his father, J. J. Trengove, was an advocate and later a judge of the Supreme Court. Initially interested in a career as a civil engineer, he instead studied law after serving his conscripted service in the South African Defence Force. He graduated from the University of Pretoria with a BCom LLB cum laude.

In 1975, Trengove joined the bar in Johannesburg. Although he had intended to specialise in commercial law, he gained a reputation for handling labour law briefs and political trials involving anti-apartheid activists. He took silk in 1987 and served stints both as chairman of the Johannesburg Bar Council and as chairman of the General Council of the Bar.

== Notable briefs ==
In the post-apartheid period, Trengove specialises in administrative law, constitutional law, and human rights law matters, and he is best known for his appearances in the Constitutional Court of South Africa. Indeed, he argued in the certification of the Constitution itself. In human rights matters, Trengove argued, inter alia, for the abolition of the death penalty in S v Makwanyane, against discrimination on the basis of HIV status in Hoffmann v South African Airways, for the protection of sex workers' labour rights in Kylie v CCMA, for the restitution of land and mineral rights to groups dispossessed during apartheid in Alexkor Ltd v Richtersveld Community, and for the roll-out of anti-retroviral treatment for HIV patients in Minister of Health v Treatment Action Campaign. He also represented mineworkers in a class action to claim damages from mining companies for damages due to the widespread contraction of silicosis; the $400 million settlement in favour of the miners was the largest in South African history. Other notable constitutional matters in which he appeared include Economic Freedom Fighters v Speaker, National Coalition for Gay and Lesbian Equality v Minister of Home Affairs, Kruger v President of the Republic of South Africa, My Vote Counts v Speaker of the National Assembly, and Corruption Watch v President.

Trengove has been active in high-profile political cases, representing former president Nelson Mandela, including in his divorce from Winnie Madikizela-Mandela, leading the prosecution of former president Jacob Zuma on charges of corruption, and representing President Cyril Ramaphosa in his dispute with the Public Protector. Trengove was outspoken about the National Prosecuting Authority's decision in 2008 to withdraw its corruption charges against Zuma, criticising the decision at a public lecture at the University of Cape Town, where Trengove is an honorary professor.

== Personal life ==
Trengove met his second wife, née Estelle Viljoen, in the 1980s, when she was a journalist covering one of his cases in Pretoria. He has six children, one of whom is film director John Trengove.
