= KFC South Africa =

South African fast food franchise

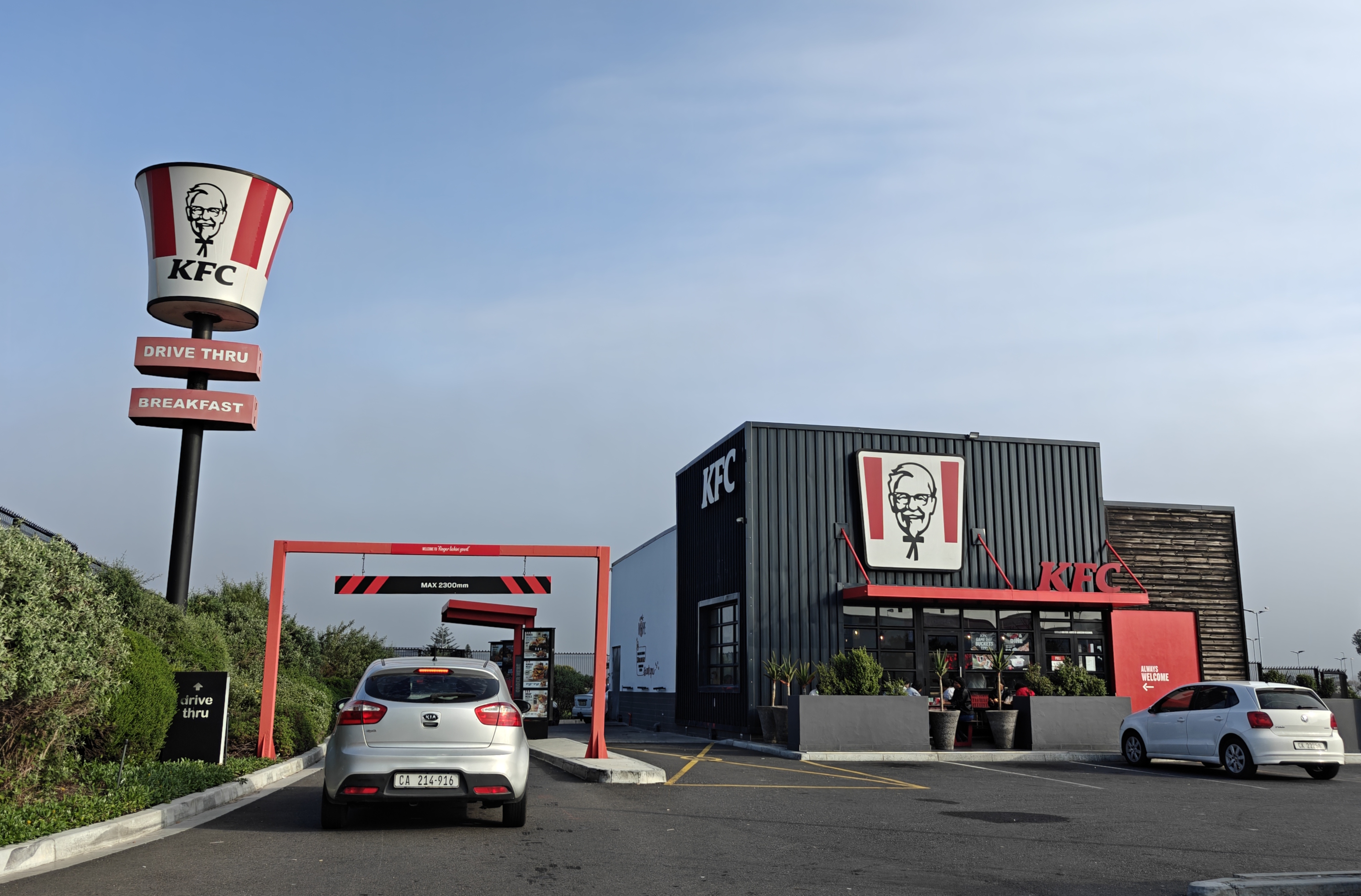
- Type: Franchise
- Industry: Fast food
- Founded: 1971; 55 years ago
- Headquarters: Johannesburg, Gauteng, South Africa
- Number of locations: 1,200 (2026)
- Area served: South Africa
- Products: Fried chicken Hamburgers; Sandwiches; Wraps; French fries Soft drinks Salads; Desserts
- Website: kfc.co.za

KFC South Africa (KFCSA) is a South African fast food chain. It is the regional operating entity of locally-based KFC Africa, which operates franchises in 22 African countries, under the banner of American fast food chain KFC. Founded in 1971, the company is headquartered in Johannesburg.

As of 2026, the company has 1,200 restaurants. As of late 2023, South Africa represents the fifth-largest market in the world for KFC.

== History ==
KFC first entered the South African market in 1971, establishing a restaurant in Johannesburg.

In 1987, due to apartheid, the US Congress passed a law forbidding American companies from owning South African assets. As a result, KFC decided to divest its 60 company-owned outlets, and its trademarks, to South African holding company Devco. The company's 120 franchised outlets were not affected. KFC continued to collect an administrative fee from Devco.

In 1994, when US sanctions against SA were lifted, KFC reacquired its former assets. At the time, there were around 300 KFC locations across South Africa.

In November 2023, KFCSA had reached over 1,000 stores, making it the country's largest fast food chain. Furthermore, by number of locations, South Africa was KFC's fifth-largest market globally. Despite having a far smaller population, SA had more outlets than countries like India, Malaysia, and Indonesia.

== Operations ==
As of 2021, KFCSA operates 960 outlets across the country, and is the largest fast food chain in South Africa by number of locations. In terms of ownership, 90% are franchised and 10% percent are company-owned.

KFC South Africa offers regional menu items such as pap, which are unique to their menu.

South Africa is one of the few countries where KFC does not sell PepsiCo soda brands, due to the latter's historically small presence in the country.

== See also ==
- List of countries with KFC franchises
