= Superior Court of Justice =

Superior Court of Justice may refer to:

- Superior Court of Justice (Brazil)
- Superior court of justice (Luxembourg)
- Ontario Superior Court of Justice
- Superior Courts of Justice of Peru
- Supreme Court of Mexico (Mexico)

== See also ==
- Quebec Superior Court
- Superior court
