= Competition Tribunal (South Africa) =

South African court of first instance for competition matters

Competition Tribunal of South Africa
- Established: 1998; 28 years ago
- Jurisdiction: South Africa
- Location: DTIC campus, 77 Meintjies Street, Sunnyside, Pretoria, Gauteng, South Africa
- Authorised by: The Competition Act, 1998
- Appeals to: Competition Appeal Court
- Judge term length: 5 years
- Language: English
- Website: comptrib.co.za

Chairperson
- Currently: Mondo Mazwai

The Competition Tribunal (CompTrib) is a court of first instance concerning competition-related matters in South Africa. It is an independent adjudicative body with cross-disciplinary expertise in law and economics. Its function is to hear and decide competition cases.

Whereas the Competition Commission is the investigative and enforcement authority, the Tribunal adjudicates on matters referred to it by the Commission. Appeals or reviews against the Tribunal are heard by the Competition Appeal Court.

Competition Tribunal members, on recommendation by the Minister of Trade, Industry and Competition, are appointed by the President of South Africa.

== History ==
Before the establishment of the Competition Tribunal, competition regulation in South Africa was overseen by the Competition Board, which operated as an advisory body to the Minister of Trade and Industry. Following the end of apartheid in 1994, the government undertook reforms to strengthen competition regulation and address the concentration of economic ownership.

In 1998, the Tribunal was established under the Competition Act, 1998, as an independent adjudicative body responsible for ruling on mergers and anticompetitive conduct. Alongside, counterpart bodies were also established, namely the Competition Commission and the Competition Appeal Court. The Tribunal became operational on 1 September 1999, with David Lewis appointed as its first chairperson.

In February 2001, amendments to the Competition Act, 1998 introduced changes to the Tribunal's procedures, jurisdiction, and institutional arrangements, alongside revised merger notification thresholds.

In 2009, Norman Manoim succeeded David Lewis as chairperson, serving until 2019. He was succeeded by Mondo Mazwai on 1 August 2019, who became the first woman and first black South African to chair the Tribunal.

== Mandate ==
The Competition Tribunal is a court of first instance and an independent adjudicative body responsible for managing and making decisions related to competition matters under the Competition Act. Its primary functions include adjudicating cases involving prohibited anticompetitive conduct, such as cartels and abuses of market dominance; and approving, conditionally approving, or prohibiting large mergers and acquisitions, following recommendations from the Competition Commission.

The Tribunal also hears appeals and reviews of certain decisions made by the Competition Commission, considers consent agreements, and may impose administrative penalties or other remedies for violations of competition law. Its proceedings are generally open to the public, and its decisions are subject to appeal or review by the Competition Appeal Court.

== Tribunal process ==
Cases are heard before a Tribunal consisting of three members of a adjudicative panel. At least one member of an adjudicative panel must be lawyer. Members of the Tribunal are experienced senior lawyers and economists with appropriate experience and knowledge of competition law and practice. Some members serve in a part-time capacity.

== Notable cases ==
=== 2023 ===
In Competition Commission vs Bank of America Merrill Lynch International Designated Activity Company and Others, the Tribunal was referred a case of collusion by the Competition Commission regarding the manipulation of the rand by 28 banking groups. The Tribunal stated that the case can proceed.

== Governance ==
=== List of Chairpersons ===
- 1999–2009: David Lewis
- 2009–2019: Norman Manoim
- 2019–present: Mondo Mazwai

=== List of Deputy Chairpersons ===
- 1999–2009: Marumo Moerane
- 2009–2012: Mbuyiseli Madlanga
- 2017–2022: Enver Daniels
- 2023: Liberty Mncube

== See also ==
- Competition Commission (South Africa)
- Competition Appeal Court
