= Department of Justice and Constitutional Development =

South African government department

- List: 10 other official names: Departement van Justisie en Staatkundige Ontwikkeling (Afrikaans); umNyango wezoBulungiswa nokuThuthukiswa komThethosisekelo (Southern Ndebele); iSebe lezoBulungisa noMgaqosiseko (Xhosa); uMnyango Wezobulungiswa Nokuthuthukiswa Komthethosisekelo (Zulu); Litiko Letebulungiswa Netekutfutfukiswa Kwemtsetfosisekelo (Swazi); Kgoro ya Toka le Tlhabollo ya Molaotheo (Northern Sotho); Lefapha la Toka le Ntshetsopele ya Molao wa Motheo (Sotho); Lefapha la Bosiamisi le Tlhabololo ya Molaotheo (Tswana); Ndzawulo ya Vululami na Nhluvukiso wa Vumbiwa (Tsonga); Muhasho wa Vhulamukanyi na Mveledziso ya Mulayotewa (Venda)

Department overview
- Jurisdiction: Government of South Africa
- Headquarters: Momentum Centre, 329 Pretorius Street, Pretoria; 25°44′52″S 28°11′42″E
- Employees: 16 063 (2022/23)
- Annual budget: R 26.3 billion (2026/27)
- Ministers responsible: Mmamoloko Kubayi, Minister of Justice and Correctional Services; Andries Nel, Deputy Minister of Justice
- Department executive: Nonkululeko Msomi, Director-General: Justice and Constitutional Development
- Child agencies: National Prosecuting Authority; South African Law Reform Commission
- Website: www.justice.gov.za

The Department of Justice and Constitutional Development is the justice department of the South African government. The department provides administrative and financial support to the court system and the judiciary (which are constitutionally independent of the executive), oversees the National Prosecuting Authority, provides legal advice and representation to organs of state, and facilitates law reform.

The political head of the department is the Minister of Justice and Correctional Services, who is supported by a Deputy Minister of Justice. As of July 2023 the minister is Thembi Nkadimeng and the deputy minister is Andries Nel.

== Financials ==
In the 2020 budget, R22,410.8 million was appropriated for the Department of Justice and Constitutional Development, and a further R2,450.8 million for the Office of the Chief Justice and Judicial Administration. In the 2018/19 financial year the department had 22,050 employees, with a further 2,415 employees in the Office of the Chief Justice.
