= Mondo Mazwai =

South African lawyer

Mondo Mazwai is a South African legal practitioner. She is the first woman and black African to chair South Africa's Competition Tribunal, a body set up under the Competition Act to adjudicate cases referred to it by the Competition Commission. On 1 August 2019, She was appointed into office by President Cyril Ramaphosa.

== Education ==
Mazwai acquired a degree in Law from the University of KwaZulu-Natal and a B.Juris from the University of the Western Cape.

== Career ==
She began her career at Cheadle Thompson and Haysom Attorneys where she worked as a candidate attorney, professional assistant and associate partner. In 1999, she joined the Competition Commission first as an investigator in the mergers and acquisitions division and then was later appointed as a senior investigator in the enforcement and exemptions division. She later became the chief legal counsel of the Commission in 2003. Later that year, she was appointed as the acting deputy commissioner. She then joined Cliffe Dekker Hofmeyr in 2005 as a director in its competition department and was appointed as head of the department in 2006. Since 2013, she has been a member of the tribunal and was appointed its chair in August 2019 by President Cyril Ramaphosa.
