= Commission for Conciliation, Mediation and Arbitration =

Labour disputes tribunal in South Africa

CCMA
- Commission for Conciliation, Mediation and Arbitration
- Formation: 1995; 31 years ago
- Type: Public Entity
- Headquarters: 28 Harrison Street, Johannesburg, South Africa
- Coordinates: 26.20647°S 28.04090°E
- Director: Mpumelelo Nconco
- Chairperson: Connie September
- Parent organisation: Department of Employment and Labour
- Budget: ▼ R 975.9 million (2024)
- Revenue: ▼ R 1.003 billion (2024)
- Disbursements: ▼ R 161.9 million
- Expenses: ▼ R 1.01 billion (2024)
- Funding: Government grant
- Staff: 881 (2024)
- Website: www.ccma.org.za

The Commission for Conciliation, Mediation and Arbitration (CCMA) is an independent tribunal that adjudicates labour disputes in South Africa. It provides free dispute resolution services to both employers and employees. Although it has a wide range of statutory functions, it is best known for resolving labour disputes through conciliation, mediation, and arbitration. Since its inception, it has handled millions of cases, helping to make dispute resolution more accessible to ordinary workers and reducing reliance on the Labour Court system.

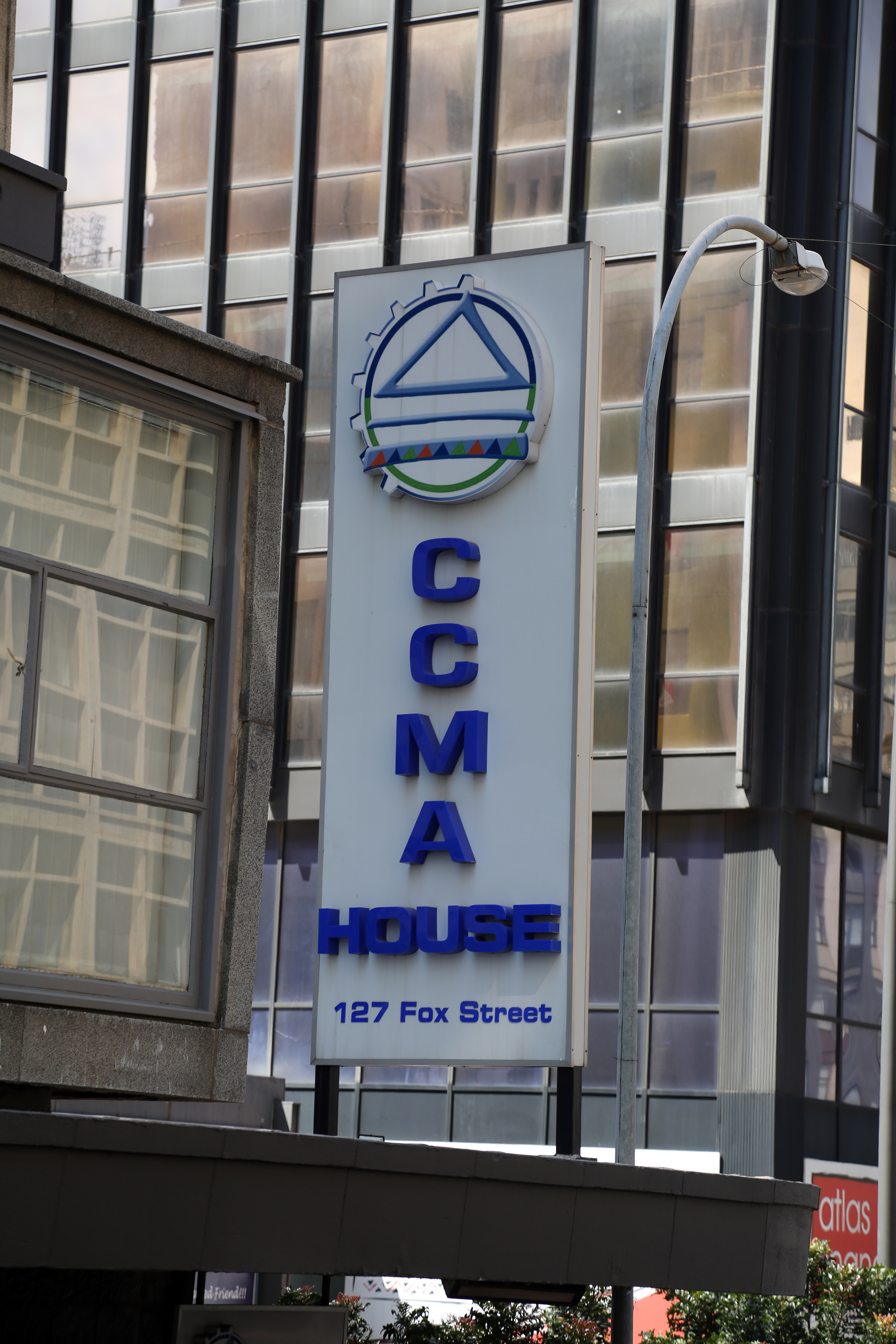
CCMA Johannesburg Office

== History ==
The CCMA was formally established in November 1996 following the adoption of the Labour Relations Act, 1995. Its formation marked a significant turning point in post-apartheid South Africa’s labour relations framework, aiming to provide affordable and accessible dispute resolution services to both workers and employers. The CCMA replaced several fragmented and often inaccessible systems, centralising labour dispute resolution under one independent body.

== Structure and funding ==
The CCMA operates independently, although it receives funding from the Department of Employment and Labour. It is overseen by a governing body chaired by Connie September, with Mpumelelo Nconco serving as director.

== Functions ==
The CCMA is mandated to perform a variety of functions under the Labour Relations Act. These include:

- Resolving disputes through conciliation, mediation, and arbitration.
- Facilitating union recognition and collective bargaining.
- Intervening in large-scale retrenchments or workplace strikes.
- Providing training and guidance in labour law compliance and dispute prevention.
- Accrediting bargaining councils and private agencies to perform similar dispute resolution functions.

In addition, the CCMA plays an advisory role in labour policy development and conducts research into employment trends and dispute trends.

== Caseload and impact ==
Since its inception, the CCMA has handled over 3.8 million labour disputes. These include matters ranging from unfair dismissals to discrimination and wage disputes. Its dispute-resolution mechanisms are seen as more efficient and affordable compared to litigation in the Labour Court.

The Commission received approximately 193,000 case referrals during the 2023/24 financial year, with an average settlement rate of over 70%. The Commission maintains a 30-day window to resolve most disputes through conciliation, helping to alleviate backlog in the labour justice system.

== Criticism ==
Despite its successes, the CCMA has faced criticism over delays in arbitration proceedings, inconsistent rulings, and resource constraints. Trade unions and employers have occasionally raised concerns about the impartiality of certain commissioners. Budget cuts, particularly in 2020 and 2021, affected the CCMA's ability to meet its service delivery targets, prompting public concern over access to justice for vulnerable workers.
