= Competition Commission (South Africa) =

South African government agency

Competition Commission (CompCom)

Agency overview
- Formed: 1998; 28 years ago
- Type: Statutory regulatory authority
- Jurisdiction: South Africa
- Status: Active
- Headquarters: 77 Meintjies Street, Sunnyside, Pretoria, Gauteng, South Africa
- Motto: A growing, deconcentrated, and inclusive economy
- Annual budget: ▼ R453 million (2026/27)
- Minister responsible: Parks Tau, Minister of Trade, Industry and Competition
- Agency executive: Doris Tshepe, Commissioner
- Parent department: Department of Trade, Industry and Competition
- Key document: The Competition Act, 1998
- Website: compcom.co.za

The Competition Commission (CompCom) is a South African government agency and the country's official anti-trust regulator. Established in 1998, it forms part of the Department of Trade, Industry and Competition (DTIC).

The Commission has the power to block mergers, acquisitions, and other transactions that would reduce competition in the South African economy, limit consumer choice, and/or decrease economic efficiency.

== History ==
Following the end of apartheid in 1994, the South African government undertook reforms of its competition legislation to address the concentration of economic ownership and strengthen the regulation of anticompetitive business practices. These reforms replaced the previous competition framework, which had been administered by the Competition Board.

The Competition Commission was established under the Competition Act, 1998, alongside counterparts the Competition Tribunal and Competition Appeal Court. The legislation's institutional provisions commenced in November 1998, and the Commission began operations on 1 September 1999, with Menzi Simelane serving as its first commissioner.

In April 2013, amendments to the Competition Act, 1998 granted the Commission formal powers to conduct market inquiries, enabling it to investigate structural and other features of markets that could prevent, distort, or restrict competition, without necessarily investigating individual companies for specific prohibited practices.

In July 2019, substantial amendments to South Africa's competition legislation came into effect, strengthening the Commission's powers concerning market inquiries, merger assessments, abuse of dominance, and economic concentration. The reforms also placed greater emphasis on economic transformation and participation by small businesses and historically disadvantaged people.

== Mandate ==
The Competition Commission is an independent statutory body responsible for investigating and enforcing competition law under the Competition Act, 1998. Its mandate is to promote and maintain competition in the South African economy by preventing anticompetitive business practices, protecting consumer choice, promoting economic efficiency, and encouraging broader participation in the economy, particularly by small and medium-sized enterprises and historically disadvantaged people.

The Commission investigates and prosecutes restrictive business practices, including cartels, price fixing, and abuses of dominant market positions. It also evaluates proposed mergers and acquisitions, approving, conditionally approving, or prohibiting intermediate mergers, while referring large mergers to the Competition Tribunal for adjudication. In assessing mergers, the Commission considers their potential effects on competition and the public interest.

Additionally, the Commission conducts market inquiries into competition and concentration within particular industries, considers applications for exemptions from competition legislation, and promotes voluntary compliance through research, education, and policy advocacy. It may refer cases to the Competition Tribunal, negotiate consent agreements, and cooperate with other regulatory authorities on matters involving competition law.

== Major rulings ==
=== South African rand manipulation ===
In 2015, the Competition Commission found local and international banks had colluded to fix the US Dollar/South African Rand (USD/ZAR) exchange rate. The cartel of banks conducted the manipulation from 2007 to September 2013.

In November 2023, after an 8-year litigation, the Competition Commission fined Standard Chartered R42.7 million for various offences that related to manipulating the USD/ZAR currency pair which included the fixing of bids, offers, bid-offer spreads, the spot exchange rate and the fixing of the exchange rate at the FIX. Standard Chartered assumed liability for its actions in manipulating the rand between 2007 and 2013.

=== Burger King acquisition ===
In 2021, the Tribunal blocked a proposed acquisition of Burger King South Africa over a lack of Black ownership.

== See also ==
- Competition Tribunal (South Africa)
- Competition Appeal Court
