= Labour Appeal Court of South Africa =

South-African court

- Established: 1995
- Jurisdiction: South Africa
- Location: Johannesburg, Cape Town, Durban, Port Elizabeth
- Composition method: Presidential appointment on the advice of the JSC and NEDLAC
- Authorised by: Labour Relations Act, 1995
- Appeals to: Supreme Court of Appeal
- Website: www.justice.gov.za/labourcourt/

Judge President
- Currently: E Molahlehi

Deputy Judge President
- Currently: Judge M.B. Mahalelo

The Labour Appeal Court is a South African court that hears appeals from the Labour Court. The court was established by the Labour Relations Act, 1995, and has a status similar to that of the Supreme Court of Appeal. It has its seat in Johannesburg but also hears cases in Cape Town, Port Elizabeth and Durban.

Judges of the Labour Court, who must be High Court judges, are appointed by the President, acting on the advice of the Judicial Service Commission and the National Economic Development and Labour Council. The Judge President (JP) and a Deputy Judge President (DJP) of the Labour Court also serve as JP and DJP of the Labour Appeal Court and there are eight other judges on the court. Each case before the court is heard by a panel of three judges.

Judgments of the Labour Appeal Court can be appealed to the Constitutional Court as there is a fundamental constitutional right to fair labour practices in the form of section 23. Such appeals are not uncommon.

== See also ==
- Labour court
- Courts of South Africa
