= Labour Court of South Africa =

South African court that handles labour law cases

- Established: 1995
- Jurisdiction: South Africa
- Location: Johannesburg, Cape Town, Durban, Port Elizabeth
- Composition method: Presidential appointment on the advice of the JSC and NEDLAC
- Authorised by: Labour Relations Act, 1995
- Appeals to: Labour Appeal Court
- Website: www.justice.gov.za/labourcourt/

Judge President
- Currently: Edwin Molahlehi

Acting Deputy Judge President
- Currently: Judge M. B. Mahalelo

The Labour Court is a South African court that handles labour law cases, that is, disputes arising from the relationship between employer, employee and trade union. The court was established by the Labour Relations Act, 1995, and has a status similar to that of a division of the High Court. It has its seat in Johannesburg and branches in Cape Town, Port Elizabeth and Durban.

Judges of the Labour Court, who must be High Court judges or lawyers with experience in labour law, are appointed by the President, acting on the advice of the Judicial Service Commission and the National Economic Development and Labour Council. The court is headed by a Judge President (JP) and a Deputy Judge President (DJP) and there are nine other judges on the court. Each case before the court is heard by a single judge.

The Labour Court has exclusive jurisdiction over cases arising from the Labour Relations Act, 1995, which deals with collective bargaining, trade unions, strikes and lockouts, unfair dismissal and unfair labour practices; the Basic Conditions of Employment Act, 1997, which deals with working hours, leave and remuneration; the Employment Equity Act, 1998, which deals with discrimination and affirmative action; and the Unemployment Insurance Act, 2001. These matters are removed from the jurisdiction of the ordinary High Courts. Judgments of the Labour Court can be appealed to the Labour Appeal Court or the Supreme Court of Appeals which in turn can be appealed to the Constitutional Court of South Africa.

== See also ==
- Labour court
- Courts of South Africa
