= Pansy Tlakula =

Faith Dikeledi Pansy Tlakula
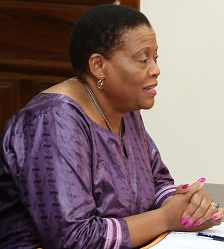
- Pansy Tlakula in 2017

Chair of the Independent Electoral Commission
- In office 11 May 2009 – 2 September 2014
- Succeeded by: Vuma Mashinini

Personal details
- Born: 18 December 1957 (age 68)
- Education: University of Limpopo (B.A.); Harvard University (Masters)

Advocate Faith Dikeledi Pansy Tlakula popularly known as Pansy Tlakula is the Chairperson of the Information Regulator of South Africa.

== Life ==
She was born in Mafikeng and got married at Waterval township, Elim in Limpopo. Her husband's family, the Tlakulas, own Elim Mall and the surrounding lands at Elim CBD. Hakamela Tlakula, the grandfather of Advocate Tlakula's husband, established of Elim Hospital and was a leading figure of the Swiss Mission Church at Elim.

Tlakula was born on 18 December 1957. She studied law at the University of the Witwatersrand before completing her master's in law at Harvard.

== African Commission on Human and Peoples’ Rights ==
Tlakula was appointed in 2005 as member of the African Commission on Human and Peoples’ Rights (ACmHPR). She served the ACmHPR for 12 years, until November 2017. She held the mandates of Special Rapporteur on Freedom of Expression and Access to Information, Chairperson of the Working Group no Specific Issues related to the work of the African Commission, and, between 2015 and 2017, she served as Chairperson of the ACmHPR.

== Controversy ==
From 2013 to 2014, Pansy Tlakula, while Chairperson of the Electoral Commission of South Africa, was involved in a protracted controversy about her role in the 2009 procurement of the Commission's national offices in Centurion. In 2013, the Public Protector, Thuli Madonsela, found that Tlakula had been guilty of maladministration, had violated procurement regulations, and had failed to disclose a conflict of interest arising from her relationship with Thaba Mufamadi, who was a part-owner of Abland with ANC MP Thaba Mufamadi, the property developer behind the R320-million lease. Beyond the undisclosed conflict of interest, the investigation further found that Tlakula was highly involved in the initiation, evaluation and adjudication of the bids for the procurement of the building, in contravention of a number of statutes. Public Protector Thuli Madonsela in her official report stated that Tlakula's in the procurement decision was "grossly irregular" including her decision to overturn the procurement committee's decision to redirect the contract to her undisclosed business partner.

A subsequent report commissioned by the National Treasury made similar findings indicating that the procurement process was not fair, transparent, or cost-effective. The report found numerous procurement irregularities in which procurement criteria were changed in the bid evaluation process to favor Abland, part-owned by Tlakula's business partner. Shortly before the 2014 elections in May, five political parties – the United Democratic Movement, African Christian Democratic Party, Congress of the People, AgangSA and the Economic Freedom Fighters – launched an application at the Electoral Court to have Tlakula removed from her post. Though the matter was postponed until after the elections, on 18 June the court found against Tlakula, recommending her removal on the basis that her misconduct had undermined the Commission's integrity. In August, the Constitutional Court dismissed her application to appeal the judgement. In terms of the Electoral Commission Act, the judgement represented the first step towards Tlakula's removal from office, and would have been followed by parliamentary committee hearings ahead of a vote by the National Assembly on her removal. However, on 2 September 2014, and while continuing to deny any wrongdoing, Tlakula resigned from the Commission after mounting pressure. This followed the earlier resignation of the Commission's head of corporate services, Norman du Plessis, who was likewise found guilty of misconduct at the direction of Tlakula in the Public Protector's investigation.
