= Welz =

Welz is a surname of German origin. Notable people with the name include:

- Emil Welz (born 1879, date of death unknown), German track and field athlete
- Gerhard Welz (1945–2024), German footballer
- Giuseppe De Welz (1774–1841), Italian economist
- Jean Welz (1908–1975), South African artist
- Joey Welz (born 1940), American musician, pianist with Bill Haley and His Comets
- Larry Welz (born 1948), American cartoonist
- Martin Welz (born 1945), South African journalist
- Peter Welz (born 1972), German artist
- Robert von Welz (1814–1878), German physician and ophthalmologist
- Tobias Welz (born 1977), German football referee
- Thomas Welz (born 1957) East German dissident

== See also ==
- Wells (name)
