= Electoral Commission of South Africa =

Electoral management body for South Africa

Electoral Commission of South Africa (ECSA)

Agency overview
- Formed: 17 October 1996; 30 years ago
- Preceding Agency: Independent Electoral Commission (IEC)
- Type: Independent electoral agency
- Jurisdiction: South Africa
- Headquarters: Election House, Centurion, Gauteng
- Employees: 6,705 (2021)
- Annual budget: R17.12 billion (2026/27)
- Agency executives: Mosotho Moepya, Chairperson; Sy Mamabolo, Chief Electoral Officer
- Key documents: Constitution, s. 190; Electoral Commission Act, 1996; Electoral Act, 1998
- Website: elections.org.za

The Electoral Commission of South Africa (ECSA), sometimes simply referred to as the Electoral Commission, is South Africa's election management body, an independent organisation established under chapter nine of the Constitution.

In 1993, an interim commission, the Independent Electoral Commission (IEC), was established to oversee SA's first democratic elections in 1994. On 17 October 1996, the commission switched to its current name, when the Electoral Commission Act, 1996 came into force, turning it into a permanent institution.

The Electoral Commission is responsible for conducting mandatory elections to the National Assembly, provincial legislatures and municipal councils. It is headquartered in Centurion, Gauteng.

== History ==
=== Interim Independent Electoral Commission ===
Under the apartheid government, elections in South Africa were administered by the Department of Home Affairs, under the Electoral Act of 1979.

Election management was only devolved to an independent body during the transition to non-racial democracy. The Independent Electoral Commission Act of 1993 established an interim body, called the Independent Electoral Commission (a name still frequently attached to the Commission in its current iteration), to manage the first democratic elections, held from 26 to 29 April 1994.

It comprised sixteen members, including eleven "respected" South African members who represented "a broad cross-section of the population," and five non-representative members from the international community.

In December 1993, then-President F. W. de Klerk appointed the following South Africans to the Commission: Johann Kriegler (Chairperson), Dikgang Moseneke (Vice Chairperson), Zak Yacoob, Ben van der Ross, Charles Nupen, Helen Suzman, Oscar Dhlomo, Frank Chikane, Dawn Mokhobo, Johan Heyns, and Rosil Jager. The five international members were Jørgen Elklit, Gay MacDougall, Amare Tekle, Walter Kamba, and Ron Gould.

The 1994 elections were widely judged to have been free and fair, despite significant administrative problems and the National Party's threat to challenge their validity in court. The interim Commission was dissolved upon the conclusion of its work in late 1994, having been funded through a special parliamentary allocation for that year alone.

=== Establishment of permanent Commission ===
After the 1994 elections, the interim Constitution of 1993 was replaced in May 1996 with the final Constitution. The Independent Electoral Commission Act was, likewise, replaced by the Electoral Commission Act of 1996, which came into force on 17 October 1996 and which established the Electoral Commission in its current, permanent, form, as a chapter nine institution.

On 1 February 1999, the inaugural Chairperson of the Commission, Johann Kriegler, resigned, citing various grievances, including the Commission's insufficient budget, a new requirement that voters would have to have bar-coded ID, and a lack of independence due to interference by the Department of Home Affairs. Kriegler was replaced by his deputy, Brigalia Bam, who occupied the position until 2011 and remains the only Chairperson to have served a complete term.

== Functions ==
The Commission's primary functions, as outlined in Section 190(1) of the Constitution, are to manage elections at all levels of government; to ensure that elections are free and fair; and to declare the results of elections in as short a time as possible (within seven days, according to the Electoral Commission Act). It has managed general (national and provincial) elections in 1999, 2004, 2009, 2014, 2019 and 2024, and local (municipal) elections in 1995-96, 2000, 2006, 2011, 2016 and 2021, as well as numerous local by-elections.

Other functions of the Commission are outlined in the Electoral Commission Act of 1996, the Electoral Act of 1998, and, most recently, the Political Party Funding Act of 2018 (which repealed the Public Funding of Represented Political Parties Act of 1997). These functions include promoting voter education; registering voters and political parties; reviewing electoral legislation; allocating seats to constituencies and delineating administrative voting areas; and disbursing public funding to, and regulating private funding of, political parties.

The Electoral Commission Act also established the Electoral Court to review the Commission's decisions and adjudicate disputes.

=== Legislation and litigation ===
Apart from the Constitution, the Electoral Commission Act, the Electoral Act, and the Political Party Funding Act, the IEC is affected by the Local Government: Municipal Electoral Act of 2000 and the Local Government: Municipal Structures Act of 1998. In March 2009, the Constitutional Court ruled that the Commission had to expand the vote to South African citizens living abroad, provided that the citizens had registered to vote while still inside the country, following a challenge to the Electoral Act and related regulations in AParty and Another v The Minister for Home Affairs and Others.

=== International activities ===
The Commission has provided technical, managerial, and logistical support to the electoral commissions of the Democratic Republic of the Congo, the Comoros, and Lesotho. In the South African Parliament's framing, these activities are a result of the Commission's broad interpretation of its statutory obligation to promote democracy through elections.

== Composition ==
The Commission comprises five members, one of whom must be a judge. According to section 6 of the Electoral Commission Act, members must be South African citizens and must not have a high party-political profile.

In practice, members are generally drawn from the judiciary, academia, and civil society organisations. The Commission is appointed for a term of seven years, and appointments are made by the President on the recommendation of the National Assembly, following nominations made by a committee of the Assembly. The nominating committee selects from a list of candidates compiled by an independent panel, which is chaired by the President of the Constitutional Court and includes the Public Protector and representatives of the South African Human Rights Commission and Commission on Gender Equality.

At their discretion, the President designates two members as Chairperson and Vice Chairperson. Members may be removed by the President on grounds of misconduct, incapacity or incompetence, following a process initiated in the Electoral Court and supported by a majority of the National Assembly. The operational side of the organisation is headed by the Chief Electoral Officer, who is its accounting officer and reports annually to Parliament through the Portfolio Committee on Home Affairs. The current Chief Electoral Officer is Sy Mamabolo.

=== Current Commissioners ===
The current commissioners are:

- Mosotho Moepya (Chairperson)
- Janet Love (Vice Chairperson)
- Nomsa Masuku
- Glen Mashinini
- Dhaya Pillay

=== Former Commissioners ===
In 1997, President Nelson Mandela appointed the first group of Commissioners in the permanent Electoral Commission:

- Johann Kriegler (Chairperson)
- Brigalia Bam (Vice Chairperson)
- Thoko Mpumulwana
- Herbert Vilakazi
- Fanie van der Merwe

Other Commissioners have included:

- Pansy Tlakula
- Terry Tselane
- Bongani Finca
- Herbert Msimang
- Raenette Taljaard
- Thami Makanya
- Ismail Hussain

== Criticism and controversies ==
=== Alleged misconduct by Pansy Tlakula ===
From 2013 to 2014, Pansy Tlakula, while Chairperson of the Commission, was involved in a protracted controversy about her role in the 2009 procurement of the Commission's national offices in Centurion. In 2013, the Public Protector, Thuli Madonsela, found that Tlakula had been guilty of maladministration, had violated procurement regulations, and had failed to disclose a conflict of interest arising from her relationship with Thaba Mufamadi, who was a part-owner of Abland, the property developer behind the R320-million lease.

A subsequent report by the National Treasury made similar findings. Shortly before the 2014 elections in May, five political parties – the United Democratic Movement, African Christian Democratic Party, Congress of the People, AgangSA and the Economic Freedom Fighters – launched an application at the Electoral Court to have Tlakula removed from her post. Though the matter was postponed until after the elections, on 18 June the court found against Tlakula, recommending her removal on the basis that her misconduct had undermined the Commission's integrity.

In August, the Constitutional Court dismissed her application to appeal the judgement. In terms of the Electoral Commission Act, the judgement represented the first step towards Tlakula's removal from office, and would have been proceeded by parliamentary committee hearings ahead of a vote by the National Assembly on her removal. However, on 2 September 2014, and while continuing to deny any wrongdoing, Tlakula resigned from the Commission.

In 2018, Madonsela opposed the appointment of Mosotho Moepya as Commissioner, on the grounds that, while Chief Electoral Officer, he had failed to provide her with crucial information during her 2013 investigation into the lease.

=== 2021 election delays ===
On 20 May 2021, the Commission appointed Dikgang Moseneke to hold an inquiry into the likelihood that local elections held as scheduled on 27 October 2021, during the COVID-19 pandemic, would be free and fair. Moseneke concluded that it would not be possible to hold free and fair elections on that date under the circumstances, and recommended delaying the elections until 2022. He also recommended that the Commission should consider approaching a court of competent jurisdiction to apply for an order postponing the elections, and, in this regard, the Commission made an urgent application to the Constitutional Court for direct access.

=== Voter education and turnout ===
As early as 2007, Parliament criticised the Commission for not being "sufficiently innovative in its approach to voter registration and voter education."
