= Busisiwe Mkhwebane =

Former Public Protector of South Africa

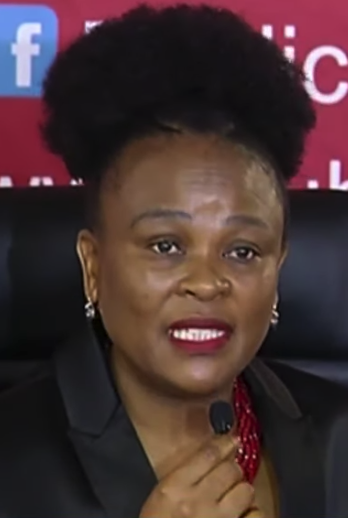

4th Public Protector of South Africa
- In office 19 October 2016 – 9 June 2022 (suspended), 11 September 2023 (impeached)
- Appointed by: Jacob Zuma
- Deputy: Kholeka Gcaleka
- Preceded by: Thuli Madonsela
- Succeeded by: Kholeka Gcaleka

Member of the National Assembly of South Africa
- In office 20 October 2023 – 16 October 2024

Personal details
- Born: Busisiwe Joyce Mkhwebane; 2 February 1970 (age 56) Bethal, Mpumalanga, South Africa
- Party: uMkhonto weSizwe (since 2024); Economic Freedom Fighters (2023–2024)
- Spouse: David Skosana
- Education: University of the North; Rand Afrikaans University; University of South Africa
- Occupation: Ombudsman; advocate; prosecutor

Busisiwe Mkhwebane is a South African advocate and prosecutor who served as the 4th Public Protector of South Africa from October 2016 until her impeachment in September 2023. Following her impeachment, she served as a Member of the National Assembly of South Africa from October 2023 to October 2024, representing the EFF. She is the first head of a Chapter 9 institution to be removed through impeachment.

== Early life and education ==
Mkhwebane was born in Bethal in the then Transvaal province (now Mpumalanga) on 2 February 1970, matriculating from Mkhephuli Secondary School in 1988. She graduated with a BProc followed by an LLB from the University of the North (now the University of Limpopo). Subsequently, she obtained a diploma in corporate law and a higher diploma in tax from the Rand Afrikaans University (now the University of Johannesburg). In 2010, she completed a Masters in Business Leadership at the University of South Africa.

== Career ==
In 1994, Mkhwebane joined the Department of Justice as a Public Prosecutor, thereafter from 1996 as Legal Administrative Officer in the International Affairs Directorate. In 1998, she joined the South African Human Rights Commission as a senior researcher. The following year, she joined the Public Protector's office as senior investigator and acting provincial representative. In 2005, she left to join the Department of Home Affairs as the director for refugee affairs, becoming acting chief director in asylum seekers management in 2009.

From 2010 to 2014, she worked as Counselor in Immigration and Civic Services in South Africa's embassy in China. A report by the Organised Crime and Corruption Reporting Project stated that during this time Mkhwebane's bank account was flagged by HSBC for receiving a US$5000 payment from the Gupta family in connection with a controversial railway contract with China South Rail. Mkhwebane rejected the allegation that she received money from the Gupta family.

In 2014, she returned to South Africa to serve as a director on country information and cooperation management at the Department of Home Affairs. Mkhwebane then worked as an analyst for the State Security Agency from July 2016 to October 2016 before she was appointed Public Protector in October 2016. During her appointment, it was made known that she had a close relationship with then President Jacob Zuma.

She served as a board member for the Refugee Fund, where payments for financial assistance are made for refugees in distress. She serves as the Director of Business Development at Iyanilla Bricks.

=== Controversies as Public Protector ===
A number of notable controversies and related judicial judgments against the Public Protector occurred during Mkhwebane's tenure. Opposition political parties, the Democratic Alliance and the Congress of the People, called for Mkhwebane to be removed as Public Protector, whilst civil society organisations such as COSATU and the Organisation Undoing Tax Abuse have called for her fitness to hold office to be reviewed.

==== Ramaphosa report ====
Mkhwebane's report into the alleged improper acceptance of a R500,000 donation to the successful ANC presidential election campaign of President Cyril Ramaphosa from BOSASA has been controversial for its findings, the supposed nature of the investigation, and the political context in which it was written. The report, which concluded, inter alia, that Ramaphosa had deliberately misled parliament when questioned about the donation, was described by the President as containing "numerous factual inaccuracies of a material nature, the findings that are found are wrong in law, are irrational and in some instances, exceed the scope of the powers of the public protector." Ramaphosa sought a judicial review of Public Protector's report, the court judged that the report should be set aside and that her office had no jurisdiction to investigate the matter. The court also stated that Mkhwebane's investigation was "unlawful,” "irrational" and "reckless" whilst stating that "Mkhwebane failed to understand her jurisdiction and failed to correctly apply the law and assess the evidence before her."

==== South African Reserve Bank ====
In June 2017, with consultation from former South African Reserve Bank (SARB) director (2003-2012), Stephen Goodson, and without consultation with government economists or legal scholars, Mkhwebane drafted changes to the Constitution to nationalize and remove the independence of the SARB and the bank's mandate to keep inflation under control; she then ordered Parliament to make those changes in the Constitution. The resultant loss of confidence in South Africa's governmental bonds caused the loss of millions of rand. In August 2017 the Reserve Bank won its lawsuit against Mkhwebane and vacated her order as violative of separation of powers, which Mkhwebane appealed.

==== Absa Bank ====
In 2017 Mkhwebane issued a report, the Bankorp-CIEX report, on her investigation into among others, Absa Bank. The Pretoria High Court set aside her order for Absa Bank to refund R1.125-billion to the government for the financial assistance bailout that its predecessor Bankorp Group had received from the former government. The court found that "The public protector did not conduct herself in a manner which would be expected from a person occupying the office of the public protector," it further stated: "She did not have regard thereto that her office requires her to be objective, honest and to deal with matters according to the law and that a higher standard is expected of her."

The court also found that Mkhwebane had lied under oath and had acted in bad faith in her investigation. The court assessed some costs of the case personally against Mkhwebane due to her conduct. The personal costs order was later upheld by the Constitutional Court of South Africa in July 2019 amounting to an estimated R900,000. The court's judgment increased public calls to have Mkhwebane removed from office.

==== Vrede Dairy Project ====
In May 2019, Mkhwebane's report into the Vrede Dairy Project was declared unconstitutional and set aside, with the Gauteng High Court finding that the Public Protector had failed in her duties to investigate the project. The Public Protector's office was ordered to pay the costs of the challenge, with some of the costs awarded against Mkhwebane personally.

==== Pravin Gordhan ====
As public protector Mkhwabane's office released a report stating that former Minister of Finance Pravin Gordhan was guilty of "violating the constitution" due to alleged improper conduct regarding the early-retirement payout of a South African Revenue Service (SARS) official. This resulted in Mkhwabane recommending that the Presidency take disciplinary action against Gordhan. Gordhan's legal counsel challenged the Mkhwanbane's finding, Mkhwabane publicly and preemptively denied that it was part of a larger political struggle to target and discredit Gordhan. In July 2019 the Gauteng Division of the High Court of South Africa ruled that Mkhwebane's recommendation against Gordhan be suspended, pending a judicial review of Mkhwabane's report on the SARS "rogue unit". The judgement stated that a number of Mkhwebane's assertions were "vague, contradictory and/or nonsensical".

==== Other judgments ====
A number of notable judgments against the Public Protector during Mkhwebane's tenure include the following.

On 30 July 2019 the horse racing company Phumelela Gaming and Leisure won a court interdict to prevent Mkhwabane's office from implementing remedial action in the horse racing industry whilst the public protector's report on the matter was under judicial review. The company argued that Mkhwebane's office violated the separation of powers, did not follow a fair process when investigating Phumelela's case and had a large number of both factual and legal material errors. This judgement closely following the Constitutional Court (in the ABSA Bank/SARB case) and the Gauteng High Court (regarding Pravin Gordhan) judgements against Mkhwebane's office was seen in the media as further weakening her position as public protector and adding strength to calls by the Democratic Alliance and civil society to initiate a parliamentary review into her fitness to hold office.

The High Court ruled against the Public Protector and set aside Mkhwebane's findings against individuals representing the Bapo ba Mogale community finding that methodology in compiling the report had a number of notable flaws.

=== Impeachment ===
In November 2020 National Assembly Speaker Thandi Modise appointed former Constitutional Court Judge Bess Nkabinde and senior advocates Dumisa Ntsebeza SC and Johan de Waal SC to an independent panel to consider whether there was prima facie evidence to suggest that Mkhwebane should be removed from office. The report was handed over to parliament in February 2021, and a parliamentary spokesperson summed up its findings: "the panel concluded that there is substantial information that constitutes prima facie evidence of incompetence and examples of this included the prima facie evidence demonstrating the Public Protector's overreach and the exceeding of the bounds of her powers in terms of the Constitution and the Public Protector Act as well as repeated errors of the same kind, such as incorrect interpretation of the law."

On 15 March 2021 the National Assembly began an inquiry into her fitness to hold office. On 11 September 2023, following the completion of the process, the National Assembly voted to remove Mkhwebane, making her the first head of a Chapter 9 institution to be impeached. Her impeachment, one month prior to the end of a 7-year non-renewable term, denied her a ten million rand gratuity that she would otherwise have been entitled to.

== Parliamentary career ==
On 16 October 2023, Mkhwebane joined the Economic Freedom Fighters party. She was sworn in as a Member of Parliament on 20 October 2023. Mkhwebane was elected to return to parliament in the 2024 general election; her husband, David, was also elected to parliament, however, for the Umkhonto Wesizwe Party. She resigned from the EFF and the National Assembly on 16 October 2024, a year after joining the party. In late October 2024, Mkhwebane joined the Umkhonto Wesizwe Party (MK) after resigning from the EFF in early October.

In January 2025, was appointed as MK's provincial convener of Mpumalanga. She was removed from the position in April 2026 as part of MK's collapsing of provincial structures into the executive.

Preceded by Thuli Madonsela	Public Protector; 2016–2023	Succeeded by Kholeka Gcaleka (acting)
