= David Skosana =

South African politician

David Skosana MP

Member of the National Assembly of South Africa
- Incumbent
- Assumed office 25 June 2024

Personal details
- Party: UMkhonto weSizwe Party
- Spouse: Busisiwe Mkhwebane
- Profession: Politician

David Mandla Skosana is a South African politician who has been a Member of Parliamernt (MP) for the UMkhonto weSizwe Party since June 2024. Skosana is married to former Public Protector and former Economic Freedom Fighters MP, Busisiwe Mkhwebane.

== Parliamentary career ==
Skosana was elected to the National Assembly of South Africa in the 2024 general election for the UMkhonto weSizwe Party. His wife, former Public Protector Busisiwe Mkhwebane, was also re-elected to parliament for the Economic Freedom Fighters at the election. They served together until Mkhwebane resigned from the EFF and consequently parliament in October 2024.

In October 2024, Public Protector Kholeka Gcaleka claimed that Skosana had threatened the CEO of the institution, Thandi Sibanyoni. Daily Maverick reported that Skosana was a cyber bully who had previously threatened numerous people, including the late-former cabinet minister Tina Joemat-Pettersson as well as News24 journalist Karyn Maughan.
