= Selby Baqwa =

South African judge, lawyer and ombudsman

The Honourable Selby Baqwa

Judge of the High Court
- Incumbent
- Assumed office 24 May 2012
- Appointed by: Jacob Zuma
- Division: Gauteng

1st Public Protector of South Africa
- In office 1 October 1995 – 30 September 2002
- Appointed by: Nelson Mandela
- Preceded by: Office established
- Succeeded by: Lawrence Mushwana

Personal details
- Born: Selby Alan Masibonge Baqwa; 4 May 1951 (age 75) Bulwer, Natal; Union of South Africa
- Party: African National Congress (1976–1995)
- Education: University of Fort Hare; University of South Africa; De Montfort University

Selby Alan Masibonge Baqwa (born 4 May 1951) is a South African lawyer and judge who served as the Public Protector of South Africa from 1995 to 2002. He was appointed as a judge of the Gauteng Division of the High Court of South Africa in May 2012. In 2013, he was nominated unsuccessfully for elevation to the Constitutional Court, where he was an acting judge in 2023.

Born in KwaZulu-Natal, Baqwa practiced as a lawyer in Durban between 1976 and 1995, first as an attorney and then, from 1988, as an advocate. He took silk in 1997. Between September 1995 and September 2002, he was South Africa's first Public Protector, appointed to that office by President Nelson Mandela. After he left public service, he was an executive at the Nedbank Group until he joined the judiciary.

== Early life and education ==
Baqwa was born on 4 May 1951 in Bulwer in the former Natal Province. He attended Umzimkulu Primary School in the Transkei and matriculated at St Francis College in Mariannhill in 1968. Thereafter, he studied law, completing a BJuris at the University of Fort Hare in 1972 and an LLB at the University of South Africa in 1975. Later in his career, in 2002, he completed an MBA at De Montfort University in Leicester, United Kingdom.

== Early legal career ==
After graduating with his LLB, Baqwa was admitted as an attorney in 1976. He practised as an attorney in Durban for the next 12 years, first as an associate at MP Mbuli & Company from 1976, then as the sole director of Baqwa & Company from 1978, and finally as a senior partner at Baqwa, Moloto, Nzimande, Webster & Maul from 1986. He specialised in civil litigation but also handled criminal law matters, including political trials of anti-apartheid activists. In 1988, he was admitted as an advocate and left his practice as an attorney to join chambers at the Durban Bar.

Baqwa was politically active throughout this period. While in university, he was a member of the South African Students' Organisation, an anti-apartheid organisation, and he joined the African National Congress (ANC) in 1976, retaining his membership until he entered public service in 1995. He was a founding member of the National Association of Democratic Lawyers and served as its national president from 1994 to 1995.

== Public Protector: 1995–2002 ==
In September 1995, President Nelson Mandela appointed Baqwa as the inaugural Public Protector, an ombudsman position established under Chapter Nine of the post-apartheid Constitution. After making his first report to Parliament in June 1996, he served a full seven-year term in the office, and during that time, in 1997, he was appointed as Senior Counsel.

Views on Baqwa's tenure as Public Protector were mixed. Many commentators agreed with Baqwa that the Public Protector was severely under-resourced, complimenting the administrative prowess he demonstrated establishing the office in that context. However, some commentators questioned the extent of Baqwa's independence from the ANC government, with Richard Calland saying that he was careful "not upset too many political apple carts too early in the life of a new institution". He was criticised in particular for his putatively lenient treatment of ANC politicians in the Public Protector's investigations into the Sarafina II and Arms Deal scandals. He was nonetheless lauded for making adverse findings against Premier Ndaweni Mahlangu and Minister Penuell Maduna in two highly publicised scandals in 1999; his report in the Mahlangu matter was strongly rejected by the ANC majority in the Mpumalanga Provincial Legislature, and his report in the Maduna matter was rejected by the ANC majority in the National Assembly. Mondli Makhanya reflected in 2016 that Baqwa "trod carefully so as not to alienate, but he still managed to hit hard."

=== Assault charge ===
In November 2000, Dolly Mkhulisi, a woman from Durban, laid a charge of assault against Baqwa, alleging that he had slapped her in a room at the Durban City Lodge on 30 October. Baqwa was at the hotel to attend an international conference, at which he was elected vice-president of the International Ombudsman Institute. Baqwa strongly declined the charge, with a spokesman saying that, "It is not unusual for people to sling mud at a person in his position," and Mkhulisi dropped the charge in mid-December.

=== Noseweek dispute ===
In April 2001, Noseweek reported that Baqwa, Judge Fikile Bam, and prosecutor Bulelani Ngcuka had attended a secret meeting at the home of ANC Chief Whip Tony Yengeni, where attendees had discussed ongoing investigations into Arms Deal corruption. Baqwa called the report "lies", saying that he and his family were on holiday in Namibia at the time the meeting was alleged to have taken place in December 2000. Martin Welz, Noseweek's editor, issued an apology and retraction in June 2001, and prosecutors declined to pursue a defamation charge against him.

== Nedbank Group: 2002–2011 ==
Baqwa's seven-year term in the Public Protector's office ended at the end of September 2002. He told the media that others had suggested that the Constitution should be amended to permit him a second term, but that he found that proposal "improper"; he also said that "people at quite a high level have suggested the bench. At this point, maybe not". Instead, it was announced in July 2002 that he would join Nedcor in October as the company's first head of corporate governance. After some complications in the appointment process, politician Lawrence Mushwana succeeded Baqwa as Public Protector in November 2002.

Baqwa remained at Nedcor (renamed Nedbank) until July 2011, when he accepted an appointment as an acting judge of the Gauteng Division of the High Court of South Africa.

== Gauteng High Court: 2012–present ==
In March 2012, the Judicial Service Commission announced that Baqwa had been shortlisted for permanent appointment to one of six vacancies in the Gauteng High Court. He was nominated for the post by the former Chief Justice, Pius Langa. Following its hearings in April that year, the Judicial Service Commission recommended Baqwa, Elizabeth Kubushi, and Bashier Vally for appointment, and President Jacob Zuma confirmed their appointment with immediate effect on 24 May 2012.

Presiding in the Pretoria High Court, Baqwa heard two high-profile matters relating to the assassination of Chris Hani: in September 2018, he overturned Justice Minister Michael Masutha's decision to deport and refuse parole to assassin Janusz Waluś, and before that, in a separate matter in May 2015, he granted medical parole to Waluś's accomplice, Clive Derby-Lewis.

=== Constitutional Court nomination ===
In January 2013, Baqwa was among five candidates – the others being Ronnie Bosielo, Brian Spilg, Jeremy Gauntlett, and Mbuyiseli Madlanga – who was nominated for possible appointment to retired justice Zak Yacoob's seat in the Constitutional Court of South Africa. After holding hearings the following month, the Judicial Service Commission shortlisted Baqwa and three others (excluding Gauntlett). However, President Zuma declined to appoint Baqwa, selecting Madlanga instead.

A decade later, Baqwa was an acting judge in the Constitutional Court in 2023.

== Personal life ==
He is married to Daphne Baqwa and has four sons.

New office	Public Protector; 1995-2002	Succeeded by Lawrence Mushwana
