= Panel of the Wise =

Consultative body of the African Union

The Panel of the Wise (PoW) is a consultative body of the African Union, composed of five appointed members who each serve three year terms. Its mandate is to provide opinions to the Peace and Security Council on issues relevant to conflict prevention, management, and resolution. Representatives are chosen for the North, East, South, West, and Central regions of the continent.

The first Panel of the Wise was established in December 2007, with a mandate which expired in 2010. The Assembly of Heads of State and Government, meeting in Kampala in 2010, decided to expand the Panel's composition, by appointing a Group of "Friends of the Panel of the Wise" appointed on the same basis as the Panel (one representative for each African sub-region).

== Appointment ==
Members of the Panel are chosen by the Chairperson of the African Union Commission and approved by the African Union Commission for three year terms, renewable once.

== Methods and mandate ==
The PoW, when requested by the Peace and Security Council (PSC) or on its own, conducts "such action deemed appropriate to support the efforts of the PSC and those of the Chairperson of the Commission for the prevention of conflicts."

The Panel meets a minimum of three times per year to discuss its work and choose regions or countries it wishes to visit. It also organizes yearly workshops on conflict prevention and management, as well as related issues, in order to help the Panel develop a thematic report that it submits to the Assembly of African Heads of State and Government for its endorsement. Previously produced reports covered topics including non-impunity, women and children in armed conflicts, and electoral disputes.

According to its website, the Panel's mandate is as follows, quoted:

1. Support and advise the effort of the chairperson of the commission and the AU PSC, in the area of conflict prevention;
2. Advise both the Commission and the Council on issues that are necessarily considered by the policy organs of the AU such as the issues of impunity, justice and reconciliation as well as, women and children in arms conflicts and its impact on the most vulnerable ones;
3. Use its good offices to carry out conflict mediation and broker peace agreements between warring parties; and
4. Help the AU Commission in mapping out threats to peace and security by providing regular advice and analysis and requesting the Commission to deploy fact-finding or mediation teams to specific countries.

== The PanAfrican Network of the Wise (PanWise) ==
PanWise is a Pan-African network, established through a Decision of the AU Assembly of Heads of State and Government in May 2013, and which brings together mediation actors and mechanisms, such as the AU Panel of the Wise, COMESA Committee of Elders, ECOWAS Panel of the Elders, SADC Panel of the Wise, future RECs mechanisms, Insiders’ Mediators, African and international mediators working in Africa, with complementary responsibilities.

The aim of PanWise is to strengthen, coordinate and harmonise prevention, early response and peacemaking efforts carried by various actors in Africa under a single umbrella.

Pursuant to the relevant provisions of the Protocol Relating to the Establishment of the Peace and Security Council of the African Union (PSC Protocol); the Protocol on Relations between the African Union and Regional Economic Communities; the Memorandum of Understanding on Cooperation in the Area of Peace and Security between the AU, the RECs and Stand by Brigades of Eastern Africa and Northern Africa (MoU); the Modalities for the Functioning of the Panel of the Wise (AU); and, finally, the experiences and lessons learned as regards cooperation, collaboration and harmonization between the AU Panel of the Wise and its counterparts at sub-regional and national levels, the Assembly of Heads of State and Government at the 21st ordinary session of the AU Summit, which marked the 50th Golden Jubilee of the OAU on 25 May 2013, adopted a decision to establish the “Pan-African Network of the Wise” (PanWise).

PanWise is comprised, as core members, of the AU Panel of the Wise/Friends and its existing and future counterparts at sub-regional level including: the Economic Community of West African States Council of the Wise; the Southern African Development Community’s (SADC) Mediation Reference Group and Panel of Elders; the Common Market for Eastern and Southern Africa’s (COMESA) Committee of Elders; and the Intergovernmental Authority for Development’s (IGAD) Mediation Contact Group, the Economic Community of Central African States (ECCAS), East African Community (EAC), Union of Maghreb States (UMA) and the Community of Sahel-Saharan States (CENSAD). As associate members, PanWise includes the Forum of Former African Heads of State, the Association African Ombudesmen and Mediators (AAOM), national infrastructures for peace, national mediation councils, etc., as well as relevant African mediation associations/ institutions.

When appropriate to the agenda of the PanWise, the AU Chairperson as well as African mediators Special Envoys, Special Representatives, Chief Mediators and their Mediation Teams shall be invited to participate in network activities.

The establishment of the “Pan African Network of the Wise” is not prejudicial to the independence of each Panel, the confidentiality required of them as they perform their roles within their respective home organisations, as well their latitude in choosing partners, donors and other stakeholders. In conducting its activities, the “Pan African Network of the Wise” is at all times cognizant that its members may be actively engaged in preventive diplomacy, mediation and related activities with parties engaged in a dispute or conflict, and therefore discretion, respect for confidentiality and careful consultation with members on deliberations is observed.

The successful establishment of the PanWise is a significant contribution to the Golden Jubilee of the OAU celebrated this year under the theme “Pan-Africanism and African Renaissance”. Indeed, it emphasizes and puts into practice the ideals of the Forefathers of the OAU, Pan-Africanism, solidarity and unity of purpose.

=== Guiding principles ===
- Motto: "Leveraging National, Regional and Continental Mediation Experiences to Strengthen Effective Conflict Prevention and Early Response"
- Adherence to the principles of subsidiarity, complementarity, comparative advantage, bottom-up and constructive interaction.
- Engagement in preventive diplomacy, mediation and related activities with parties engaged in a dispute or conflict, and observance of discretion, respect for confidentiality and careful consultation with members on deliberations.
- Awareness raising and guardianship of institutional norms in light of conflict prevention and peacemaking activities on the ground. The “Pan African Network of the Wise” shall support the AUC as well as its equivalents at REC level in awareness raising and monitoring of observance of normative principles agreed to by member states (treaties, protocols and decisions at the AU, RECs, RMs and member states) with relevance to peace and security but also governance, human rights, in light of conflict prevention and peacemaking activities conducted by Special Envoys, Special Representatives and Chief Mediators on the ground
- Regular exchange of information on all pertaining activities; a close partnership and enhanced coordination; development and implementation of joint programmes and activities in the area of peace.

=== Landmark activities and impact ===
- Through conflict prevention or fact finding missions (including good offices, fact-finding, conciliation, confidence-building, mediation, negotiation, etc.), foster policies aimed at promoting democratic principles and practices, good governance, the rule of law and the protection of human rights and fundamental freedoms, respect for the sanctity of human life and international humanitarian law.
- Join forces to give their pronouncements on key (often controversial) issues a stronger level of authority, legitimacy and therefore influence
- Collaborative research: undertake collaboration on thematic research and horizon scanning. Over and above the active participation of REC associated panelists in the AU Panel’s thematic work and related workshops, the network shall aim at systematically developing collaborative thematic research projects and activities.
- Experience sharing, best practices and lessons learned, joint training and capacity-building initiatives.
- Policy Harmonisation and Strategic Orientation on Conflict Prevention and Peacemaking: the “Pan African Network of the Wise” shall reflect on and address some of the more strategic and normative policy harmonization dimensions of conflict prevention and peacemaking within the context of the APSA
- Support RECs/RMs and Member States in establishing formal Panels of the Wise, Peace/Mediation committees.

== Current panel ==
Panel of the Wise (2018-2022)
Region	Member	Country	Description	Role in Panel
North	Amr Moussa	Egypt	former Arab League Secretary-General; former Minister of Foreign Affairs	Member
West	Ellen Johnson Sirleaf	Liberia	former President of Liberia; 2011 Nobel Peace Prize laureate	Member
East	Dr. Specioza Wandira Kazibwe	Uganda	former Vice President of Uganda	Member
Central	Honorine Nzet Bitéghé	Gabon	former Minister of Social Affairs	Member
South	Hifikepunye Pohamba	Namibia	former President of Namibia	Chairperson and Member

== Former panels ==
3rd Panel of the Wise (2014-2016)
Region	Member	Country	Description	Role in Panel
North	Lakhdar Braimi	Algeria	former UN and Arab League Envoy for Syria; former Minister of Foreign Affairs	Member
West	Dr. Edem Kodjo	Togo	former Prime Minister of Togo; former OAU Secretary-General	Member
East	Dr. Specioza Wandira Kazibwe	Uganda	former Vice President of Uganda	Member
Central	Albina Assis	Angola	former Minister of Petroleum	Member
South	Dr. Luisa Diogo	Mozambique	former Prime Minister of Mozambique	Member and Chairperson

2nd Panel of the Wise (2010-2013)
Region	Member	Country	Description	Role in Panel
North	Ahmed Ben Bella	Algeria	former President of Algeria	Member and Chairperson
West	Mary Chinery Hesse	Ghana	former Deputy Director-General of the International Labour Organization; former Chancellor of the University of Ghana	Member
East	Salim Ahmed Salim	Tanzania	former Secretary-General of the Organisation of African Unity	Member
Central	Marie Madeleine Kala-Ngoy	Democratic Republic of the Congo		Member
South	Kenneth Kaunda	Zambia	former President of Zambia; former Secretary-General of the Non-Aligned Movement	Member

1st Panel of the Wise (2007-2010)
Region	Member	Country	Description	Role in Panel
North	Ahmed Ben Bella	Algeria	former President of Algeria	Member and Chairperson
West	Elisabeth K. Pognon	Benin	President of the Constitutional Court in Benin	Member
East	Salim Ahmed Salim	Tanzania	former Secretary-General of the Organisation of African Unity	Member
Central	Miguel Trovoada	São Tomé and Príncipe	former President of São Tomé and Príncipe	Member
South	Brigalia Bam	South Africa	Head of South Africa's Independent Electoral Commission	Member

== Current members of the Friends of the Panel (former members) ==
The current members and friends of the Panel of the Wise, who are the outgoing members of the Panel of the Wise serving from 2010 to 2014, are:

Region	Member	Country	Description	Role in Panel
North	Ahmed Ben Bella	Algeria	former President of Algeria	Member (Chairperson; 2nd & last term), (N.B., deceased, April 2012)
West	Mary Chinery-Hesse	Ghana		Member (1st term)
East	Salim Ahmed Salim	Tanzania	former Secretary-General of the Organisation of African Unity	Member (2nd & last term)
Central	Marie-Madeleine Kalala	Democratic Republic of the Congo		Member (1st term)
South	Kenneth Kaunda	Zambia	President of Zambia	Member (1st term)
North	TBA			Friend
West	Elisabeth K. Pognon	Benin	President of the Constitutional Court in Benin	Friend (2nd & last time)
East	TBA			Friend
Central	Miguel Trovoada	São Tomé and Príncipe	former President of São Tomé and Príncipe	Friend (2nd & last term)
South	Brigalia Bam	South Africa	Head of South Africa's Independent Electoral Commission	Friend (2nd & last term)

== See also ==
- African Union
- Peace and Security Council
