= Gezane Mushwana =

South African politician (born 1944)

Member of the National Assembly
- In office 1994–1999

Personal details
- Born: Gezane Michael Mushwana; 15 April 1944 (age 82) Bordeaux, Northern Transvaal; Union of South Africa
- Party: African National Congress
- Relations: Lawrence Mushwana (brother)

Gezane Michael Mushwana (born 15 April 1944) is a retired South African politician from Limpopo. Formerly a politician in the apartheid-era Gazankulu Legislative Assembly, he represented the African National Congress (ANC) in the National Assembly from 1994 to 1999.

== Early life and career ==
Mushwana was born on 15 April 1944 in Bordeaux outside Tzaneen. He had several siblings, including half-siblings from his father's first marriage; Lawrence Mushwana is his younger brother.

After spending his childhood as a herd boy, Mushwana entered school at age 12 and completed standard six in 1962; he later dropped out of high school to work a series of jobs in Johannesburg. He also established a small, 12-page newspaper, the Gazankulu Herald, which he edited until it was taken over the Tzaneen Herald in 1973.

== Political career ==
Mushwana later joined the legislative assembly in the Gazankulu bantustan, gaining election as Speaker in 1989. From 1992 to 1993, he was the president of the South African National Civics Organisation in the Northern Transvaal.

After the fall of apartheid, in South Africa's first post-apartheid elections in 1994, Mushwana was elected to an ANC seat in the National Assembly. He served a single term in his seat. After leaving Parliament, he represented the ANC as a local councillor in Limpopo.
