= Villa Zilveli =

Coordinates: 48°52′40″N 2°22′32″E

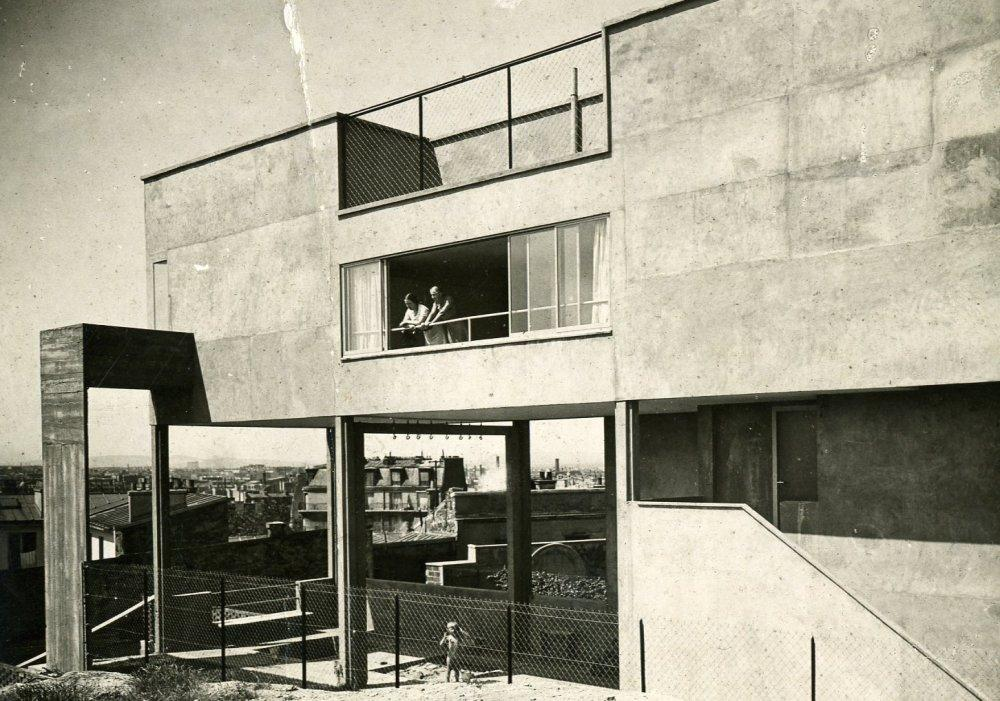
- The villa in 1933, the year it was built
- Interactive map of the Villa Zilveli area

General information
- Type: Private residence
- Architectural style: Modernist
- Location: Paris, France, 70 rue Georges-Lardennois, 19th arrondissement
- Construction started: 1933
- Client: Athanase Zilveli

Technical details
- Floor area: 216 square meters

Design and construction
- Architect: Jean Welz

Built in 1933 by architect Jean Welz, the Villa Zilveli (or Zilveli House) is a characteristic example of modernist architecture located in the 19th arrondissement of Paris, France, on the Butte Bergeyre at No. 70 rue Georges-Lardennois.

== History ==
=== Construction ===
The two-storey villa, with a surface area of 136 square meters, was built in 1933 for Athanase Zilveli, a Greek engineer and accountant born in Turkey. He purchased the land and had the house built as a birthday present for his wife, a woman from Normandy whom he had met in Paris.

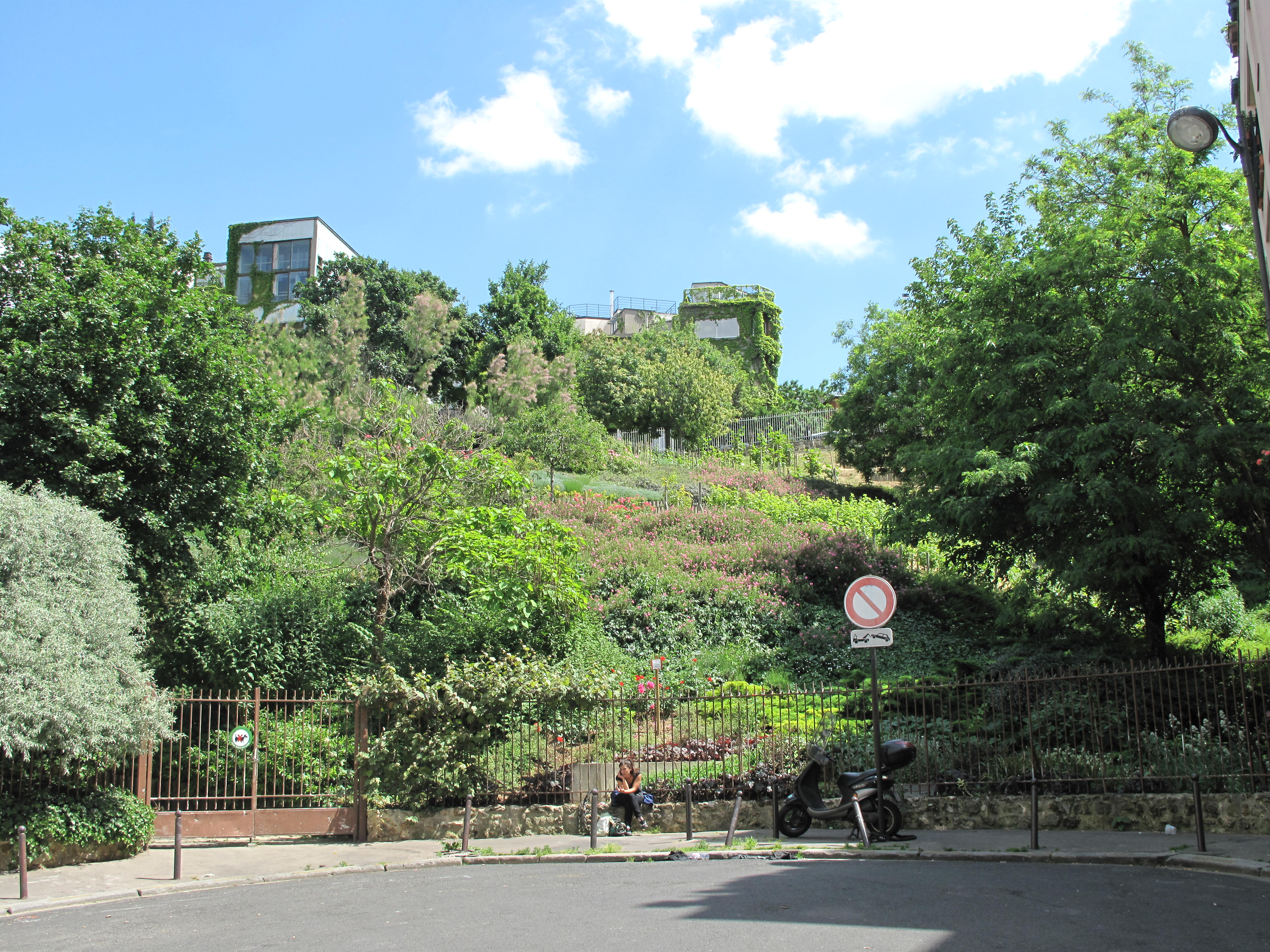
Butte Bergeyre seen from rue des Chaufourniers, with the Villa Zilveli—now demolished—visible at the top left.

Built into the hillside of the Butte Bergeyre by architect Jean Welz (1900–1975), the house measures 20 meters by 4.5. It rests on slender cruciform reinforced concrete pillars, raising it up to 5 meters above ground. While it evokes the work of Le Corbusier, the exposed concrete surfaces highlight the joints between each façade panel, departing from the smooth aesthetic of the Villa Savoye. Designed by Welz, the two large windows offer remarkable views: the west-facing one opens onto the Sacré-Cœur Basilica in Montmartre, while the south-facing window spans the full height of the Eiffel Tower. The south façade also originally featured a cantilevered concrete balcony with an integrated desk and seat, creating a true outdoor office—but this avant-garde structure was later demolished by order of the Prefecture.

=== Legacy ===
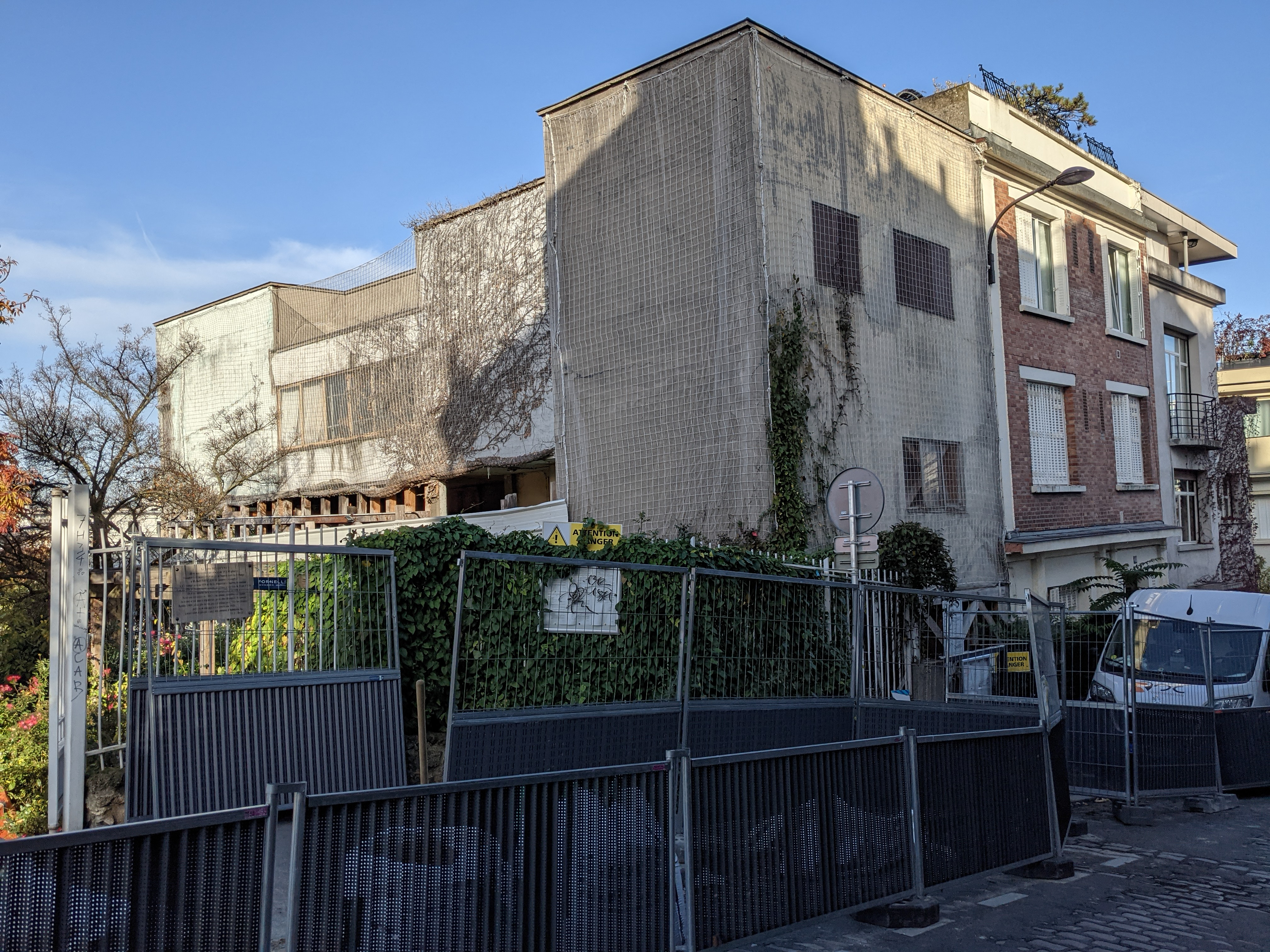
The Villa Zilveli in 2019, purchased in ruins by Jean-Paul Goude with the intention of restoring it.

This unique piece of modernist architecture was left abandoned and uninhabited for about a decade, raising concern among heritage advocates. Writer Virginie Despentes even used it as the squat of Vernon Subutex, the main character in her trilogy of the same name. In 2006, the City of Paris issued a safety decree (arrêté de péril), but due to disputes between heirs, no action was taken. The measure was renewed as an imminent danger decree in January 2019.

In June 2019, artist Jean-Paul Goude purchased the villa at auction for 2.2 million euros, but in April 2021, faced with the impossibility of restoring the dilapidated structure, Goude announced his intention to demolish and rebuild it identically at a cost equivalent to the purchase price.

The villa was demolished in the summer of 2022, but in 2024, at age 85, Goude ultimately abandoned the reconstruction project and put the 216 m² plot up for sale at 2.5 million euros with planning permission and a faithful reconstruction project developed with Lankry Architectes.

Built on stilts, the planned living spaces take advantage of natural light and offer panoramic views of Paris. The reconstruction project features a refined interior design that aims to revive this architectural icon with its original avant-garde design and clean lines: oak parquet floors, custom carpentry, and underfloor heating are planned to attract architecture enthusiasts drawn to the original home's charm:

The house will once again display its elegant silhouette on the slopes of the Butte Bergeyre. It will be alive and inhabited once more, regaining its original appearance and function.

— Thomas Billard (Lankry Architectes).

External image
- Slideshow of images showing the villa at different times and its reconstruction project. (source: Iconichouses.org).

== See also ==
=== Radio ===
- "Reconstruction of Villa Zilveli: A Divisive Project", France Culture, 16 August 2022
