= Lawrence Mushwana =

South African politician (born 1948)

Chairperson of South African Human Rights Commission
- Incumbent
- Assumed office October 2009
- Preceded by: Jody Kollapen

2nd Public Protector of South Africa
- In office 1 October 2002 – 18 October 2009
- Deputy: Mamiki Shai
- Preceded by: Selby Baqwa
- Succeeded by: Thuli Madonsela

Personal details
- Born: Mabedle Lawrence Mushwana; 3 March 1948 (age 78)
- Party: ANC
- Relations: Gezane Mushwana (brother)
- Education: University of Zululand
- Occupation: Ombudsman
- Profession: Lawyer

Adv Lawrence Mabendle Mushwana (born 3 March 1948) was the Public Protector of South Africa before advocate Thuli Madonsela succeeded him. Mushwana was appointed by President Thabo Mbeki from October 2002 until October 2009.

Mushwana is a lawyer by profession with a Bachelor of Laws from the University of Zululand. From 1972 to 1975 he worked as an interpreter at the Bushbuckridge Magistrate's Court. From 1992 until 2003 he worked as an attorney with Mushwana Attorneys.

He is a member of the African National Congress, having served in the Limpopo Provincial Executive from 1994 to 2002, and in the National Executive from 1999 until 2002. From 1999 to 2002 he was also the Deputy Chair of the National Council of Provinces. He was appointed as the South African Public Protector in 2002 and at the end of his term in 2009 he left to chair the South African Human Rights Commission.

Preceded by Selby Baqwa	Public Protector; 2002–2009	Succeeded by Thuli Madonsela
