= Jean-Paul Goude =

French artist (born 1938)

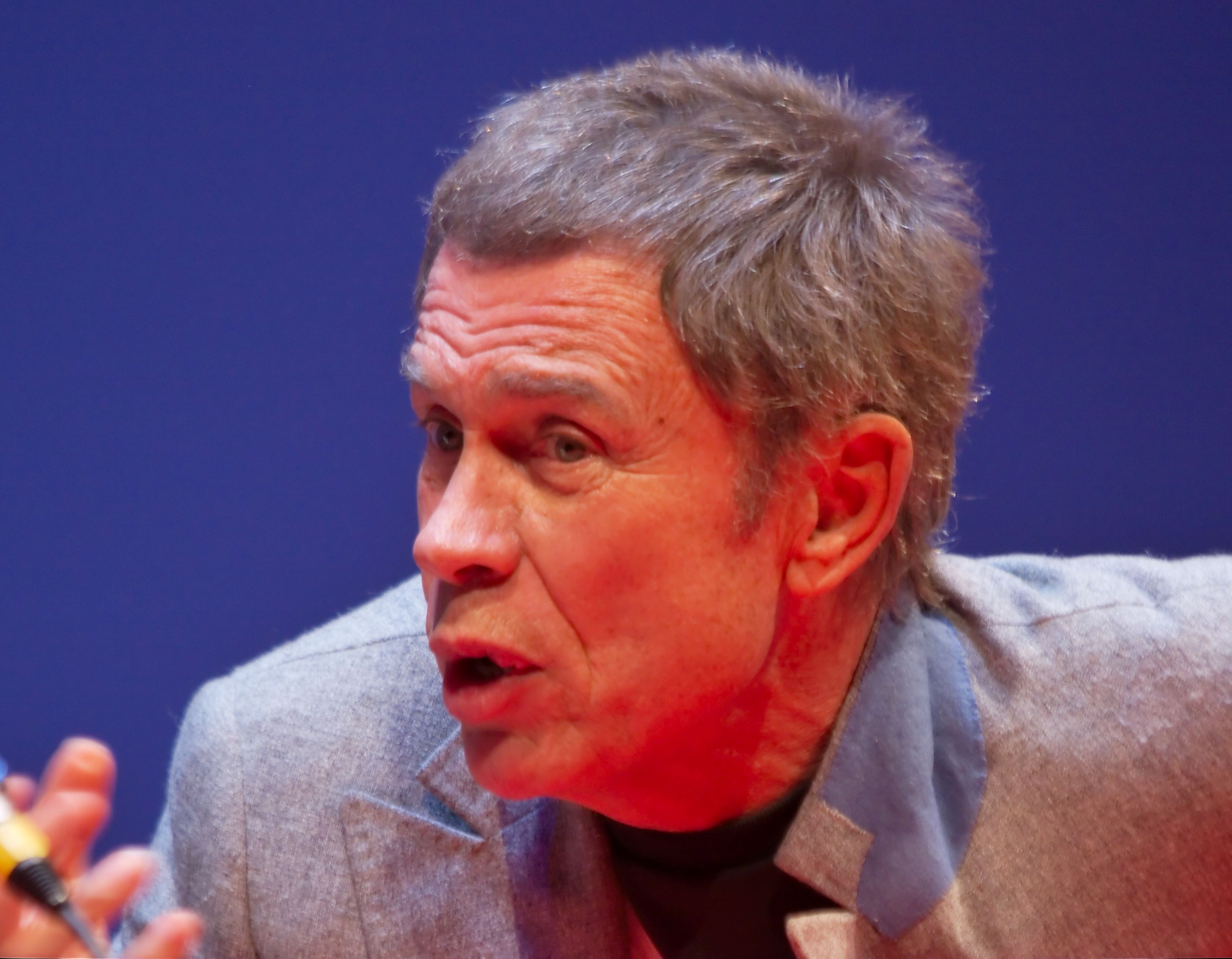
- Goude in 2008
- Born: 8 December 1938 (age 87); Montreuil, France
- Education: École nationale supérieure des arts décoratifs
- Occupation: Graphic Designer
- Years active: 1968–present
- Spouse: Karen Park Goude
- Children: 3

Jean-Paul Goude (French pronunciation: [ʒɑ̃pɔl ɡud]; born in Montreuil, Seine-Saint-Denis 8 December 1938) is a French graphic designer, illustrator, photographer, advertising film director and event designer. He worked as art director at Esquire magazine in New York City during the 1970s, and choreographed the 1989 Bicentennial Parade in Paris to mark the 200th anniversary of the French Revolution. In addition, over the last three decades, he has created campaigns and illustrations for brands including Perrier, Citroën, Kodak, Chanel, Kenzo, Shiseido, Cacharel, H&M, Galeries Lafayette and Desigual.

== Early life ==
Jean-Paul Goude was born on 8 December 1938 to an American ballet dancer and a French elevator repairman, and grew up in the Paris suburb of Saint-Mandé. According to his book Jungle Fever, the most notable characteristic that Goude acknowledged in his childhood self was a fascination with black people. The vast majority of his models are black women.

Goude's mother exposed him to different forms of print media. "At home, we received American magazines," Goude told Vogue magazine. "The advertising, in the 1960s, was extraordinary. The first time an issue of Esquire arrived with a cover by George Lois, I said to myself, that's what I want to do." He studied at the Ecole Nationale Superieure des Arts Decoratifs in Paris before embarking on his career as an illustrator.

== Career ==
=== Esquire magazine ===
In 1968, Harold Hayes, editor of Esquire magazine, asked Goude to art direct a special edition of the magazine to celebrate its 75th issue. Several months later, Goude was asked to become the magazine's full-time art editor, despite having limited experience working with layouts. His illustrations for the magazine, including an oil-on-photo painting of Mao Zedong in the Yangtze River with a rubber Donald Duckie, have been described as skirting on the edges of surrealism.

=== Grace Jones ===
Goude worked closely with model-turned-pop-singer Grace Jones, consulting on her image, choreographing her live stage performances, directing her music videos, and creating her album covers. Goude used retouching before computer manipulation to depict Jones in an impossible pose for her Island Life album. Jones also appeared in much of Goude's other work, including his 1985 Citroën CX 2 commercial.

=== Jungle Fever ===
Published in 1983, Goude's book Jungle Fever includes many of Goude's photographs, as well as autobiographical information. The book is separated into several chapters, each titled with the name of the models used in his photographs. Goude was known for creating exaggerated and manipulated forms using collage and post-production tactics and the book shows the progression of several works from sketch to finished work. Examples of these techniques can be found within the book in images such as "Carolina Beaumont" and "Island Life". In "Island Life," a photo which he created for cover for Grace Jones's album of the same name, Goude photographed her in several different positions, then overlaid the images to elongate the neck, and legs, and to display her torso completely turned forward. He would then paint in the gaps between body parts to make the image appear natural.

=== Kim Kardashian ===
In 2014, Goude photographed Kim Kardashian for Paper magazine, which used the caption break the internet on the cover of the edition which featured the photos. One of the images was a recreation of Goude's earlier work "Carolina Beaumont". Like the earlier image, the new photo features Kardashian holding an exploding champagne bottle, with the spray arcing over her head and landing in a champagne glass balanced on her buttocks. Others have drawn the comparison between these photos and depictions of Sarah Baartman, seeing them as part of the continuing history of the exploitation of black women's bodies.

=== Television commercials ===
Goude's first television advertisement was a TV spot for Lee Cooper Jeans in 1983. He has also created advertisements for clients such as Azzedine Alaia, Perrier, and Cacharel. In 1984, Goude shot a spot for Kodak that followed the adventures of the Kodakettes, mischievous kids clad in red-and-white stripes. In 1992, he filmed an ad for Chanel Fragrance in which he put model Vanessa Paradis in a birdcage.

=== Print campaigns ===
Goude has created print campaigns for the Parisian department store Galeries Lafayette. Goude has worked with the company for more than 10 years, and has been given considerable creative freedom.

=== Architecture ===
In June 2019, Goude acquired the Villa Zilveli in Paris, a modernist house from the 1930s that had fallen into disrepair, with the intention of restoring it. However, faced with the scale of the work required, he announced in April 2021 that the building would be demolished and rebuilt identically. The villa was demolished in the summer of 2022, but in 2024, at the age of 85, Goude ultimately abandoned the idea of rebuilding it. He put the 212 m^{2} (2,280 sq ft) plot of land up for sale along with a building permit and a reconstruction plan faithful to the original, developed in collaboration with Lankry Architectes.

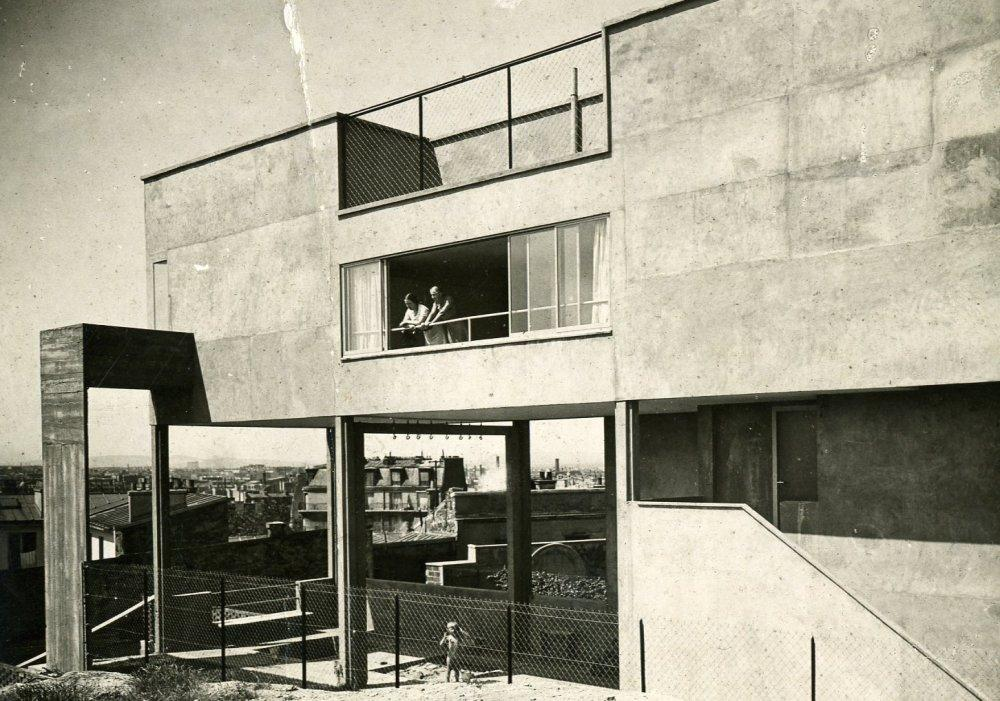
Villa Zilveli in 1933, the year of its construction.

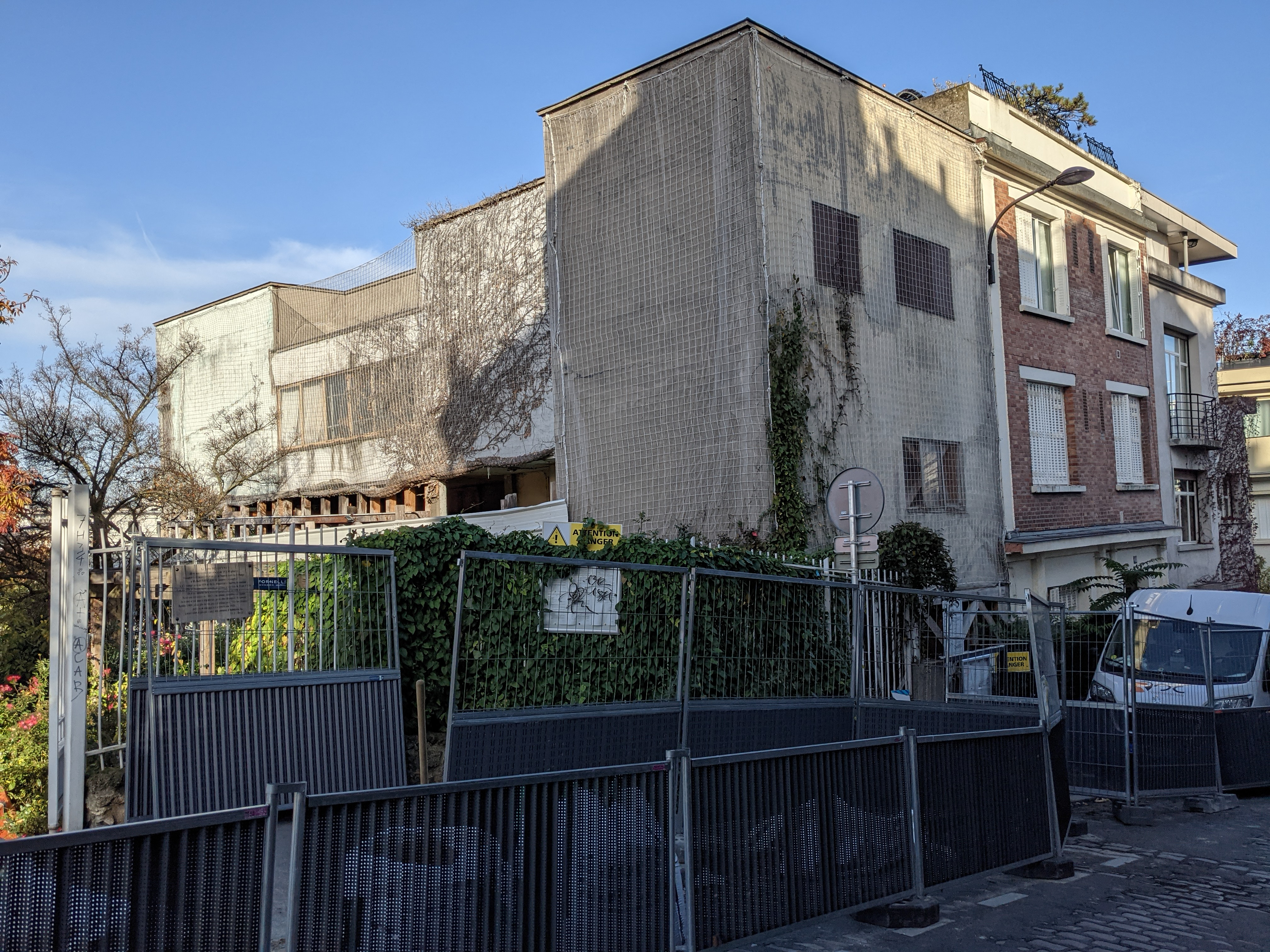
Villa Zilveli in ruins, shortly after it was acquired by Goude.

Media related to Villa Zilvelli at Wikimedia Commons

== Exhibitions ==
Several retrospectives of Goude's work have been held. In 2011, the Musée des Arts Décoratifs, Paris presented the exhibition "Goudemalion". Padiglione d’Arte Contemporanea in Milan held the retrospective "So Far So Goude" in 2016. "In Goude we Trust!" was staged and at Palazzo Giureconsulti in Milan in 2019.

== Personal life ==
Throughout his career, Goude associated with numerous models. Goude dated several of these muses, including Farida Khelfa, and Grace Jones.

Goude's relationship with Jones began in 1977, when Jones asked Goude for advice in creating album artwork and music videos. As his muse, Grace Jones figured prominently in Goude's work. Goude has a son with Grace Jones. He and his wife Karen Park Goude have two children together.

== Selected works ==
- Several images and music videos for Grace Jones
- Citroën CX, ad, 1984, with the car driving into the mouth of a giant robotic head looking like Grace Jones.
- Design of the 14 July parade on the Champ Elysées, 1989 celebrating the Bicentennial of the French Revolution.
- Chanel Égoïste, ad, 1990
- Chanel Coco (fragrance), ad, 1991, with Vanessa Paradis as a bird in a cage
- Logo of television channel La Cinq, 1991 (used until the channel's bankruptcy in April 1992)
- Prada (Candy) with Léa Seydoux
- Shiseido (Zen parfum)
- Jungle Fever
- "Break the Internet" photos with Kim Kardashian for Paper magazine
- Rest (Charlotte Gainsbourg album), Album artwork
