= Noseweek =

Satirical South African tabloid founded 1993

Noseweek was a monthly South African tabloid published by Chaucer Publications that appeared in print from June 1993 to March 2021. It is best known for regular legal action against it, including a failed bid at interdiction by banking group FirstRand in 2008 (where editor Martin Welz represented himself) and defamation actions by judge Fikile Bam and former public protector Selby Baqwa.

In 2021, Noseweek lost a defamation case against senior attorney Leonard Katz, who sued Noseweek over a 2014 article that made allegations about Katz's behavior in liquidation trials. Editor Martin Welz and publisher Chaucer Publications were ordered to pay R330 000, about a third of the million Katz sought, as well as legal charges. Following the 2021 ruling, Martin Welz announced that Noseweek's print publication was "unlikely to survive" though operations might continue online. He called the occasion a "sad end to an independent print publication that has unashamedly taken up the cause of the underdog, spoken truth to power, and managed to survive the odds with good humour for 28 years."

== See also ==
- List of satirical magazines
