= Commission for Gender Equality =

The Commission for Gender Equality (CGE) is an independent chapter nine institution in South Africa. It draws its mandate from the South African Constitution by way of the Commission for Gender Equality Act of 1996.

== Vision and mission ==
Section 187 of the Constitution of the Republic of South Africa led to the establishment of the Commission for Gender Equality (CGE). The vision of the CGE is "a society free from gender oppression and inequality". Its mission is to "advance, promote and protect gender equality in South Africa through undertaking research, public education, policy development, legislative initiatives, effective monitoring and litigation".

== Commissioners ==
Nine commissioners were appointed by the South African President Jacob Zuma for various terms of office commencing 1 June 2012. Mfanozelwe Shozi, Thoko Mpumlwana, Janine Hicks, Sylvia Desiree Stevens-Maziya, Wallace Amos Mgoqi, Ndileka Eumera Portia Loyilane and Nondumiso Maphazi Ranuga were appointed as full-time members and Lulama Nare and Amanda Gouws were appointed as part-time members. Mfanozelwe Shozi, a former Deputy Chairperson and Acting Chairperson who joined the CGE in 2002, was appointed as Chairperson for the period from 1 June 2012 to 30 January 2017. Shozi gives special attention to mobilizing men to fully embrace gender equality.
