= Brigalia Bam =

South African women's activist (born 1933)

- Born: Brigalia Ntombemhlope Bam; 1933 (age 92–93); Transkei, Eastern Cape, South Africa
- Education: University of Chicago
- Occupations: Social activist and writer.

Brigalia Ntombemhlope Bam (born 1933) is an Anglican women's and social activist and writer.

== Personal life ==
Brigalia Ntombemhlope Bam was born in 1933 in the former Transkei, in the Eastern Cape. Although Bam trained and worked as a teacher, she received further training in South Africa and abroad in the fields of social work, communication, and management. She is a qualified social worker with a post-graduate degree from the University of Chicago.

== Professional life ==
Bam has held various posts throughout the world. She was the Africa Regional Secretary and Co-ordinator of the Women’s Workers' Programme for the International Food and Allied Workers Association based in Geneva. She has co-ordinated the World Young Men’s Christian Association's International Training Institute and Programme, as well as its affiliate, the Development for Human Rights. She was also Executive Programme Secretary for the Women’s Department of the World Council of Churches. Between 1997 and 1998, Bam served as General Secretary of the South African Council of Churches from 1994 to 1999.

In South Africa, she was a founding member of the Women’s Development Foundation and became the Foundation’s President in 1998. She has been a board member of the Matla Trust as well as the South African Broadcasting Corporation. Since 1999, Brigalia Bam has become a familiar personality to South Africans as the Chairperson of the Independent Electoral Commission of South Africa. From 2007, she was on the Panel of the Wise.

She is the chancellor of the Walter Sisulu University. She is currently a member of the International Elections Advisory Council.

== Awards ==
- In 1999 the Order of Simon of Cyrene
- The Order of the Baobab in Silver
- In 2000 The SAWW Award
- The 2011 Shoprite Checkers Women of the Year Lifetime Achievement Award
- Mahatma Gandhi International Award for Peace and Reconciliation 2013
- Honorary Doctorate in Literature, March 2019, University of the Witwatersrand

== Publications ==
- 1971: What is Ordination Coming To?
- 1979: New Perspectives for Third World Women
- 1994: Women Voices Worldwide
- 1998: All about Eve: women of Africa in Anglicanism: A Global Communion
- 1986: Priorities for Women in South Africa in Speaking of faith: cross-cultural perspectives on women, religion and social change
