= Kholeka Gcaleka =

Public Protector of South Africa

5th Public Protector of South Africa
- Incumbent
- Assumed office 1 November 2023 (Acting since 9 June 2022)
- President: Cyril Ramaphosa
- Preceded by: Busisiwe Mkhwebane

Deputy Public Protector of South Africa
- In office January 2020 – 1 November 2023
- Appointed by: President Cyril Ramaphosa
- Public Protector: Busisiwe Mkhwebane
- Preceded by: Kevin Malunga

Personal details
- Born: Nompilo Kholeka Gcaleka; 1982 Johannesburg, South Africa
- Education: University of KwaZulu-Natal (LLB Degree); University of Johannesburg (LLM Degree)
- Website: official website

Nompilo Kholeka Gcaleka is a South African lawyer and the current Public Protector of South Africa. She previously served as Deputy Public Protector and became Acting Public Protector on 9 June 2022 following the suspension of Public Protector Busisiwe Mkhwebane.

Gcaleka was recommended for appointment as the fifth person to hold the position of Public Protector in a vote by the National Assembly on 19 October 2023. The Democratic Alliance (DA) and the Economic Freedom Fighters (EFF) opposed Gcaleka's nomination to the Public Protector's office, saying she was not a suitable candidate.

President Cyril Ramaphosa formally appointed Gcaleka for a seven-year term as Public Protector on 1 November 2023.
