= Electoral Court of South Africa =

South African court dealing with electoral matters

- Verkiesingshof (Afrikaans); iKhotho yezamaKhetho (Southern Ndebele); iNkundla yamatyala oNyulo (Xhosa); Inkantolo Yezokhetho (Zulu); Inkantolo Yelukhetfo (Swazi); Kgorotsheko ya Dikgetho (Northern Sotho); Lekgotla la Dinyewe tsa Dikgetho (Sotho); kgotlatshekelo ya ditlhopho (Tswana); Huvo ya nawu ya swa Nhlawulo (Tsonga); Khothe ya Khetho (Venda)
- Interactive map of Electoral Court of South Africa
- 29.116044°S 26.216923°E
- Established: 1996; 30 years ago
- Jurisdiction: South Africa
- Location: Corner of Mirriam Makeba and President Brand Streets, Bloemfontein, Free State
- Coordinates: 29.116044°S 26.216923°E
- Composition method: Presidential appointment on the advice of the JSC
- Authorised by: Electoral Commission Act, 1996
- Appeals to: The Constitutional Court and, in certain matters, the Supreme Court of Appeal
- Number of positions: 5
- Website: Electoral Court of South Africa

Chairperson
- Currently: Dumisani Zondi
- Since: December 2022

The Electoral Court is a South African court that oversees the Electoral Commission of South Africa (IEC), and the conduct of elections in the country. It was established by the Electoral Commission Act, 1996, to replace a Special Electoral Court which oversaw the 1994 elections and has status similar to that of a division of the High Court.

The court consists of a judge of the Supreme Court of Appeal as chairman, two High Court judges, and two other members. All members are appointed by the President on the advice of the Judicial Service Commission.

As of 2022, the Chairperson is judge Dumisani Zondi, who also serves as the Deputy President of the Supreme Court of Appeal.

The Electoral Court has its administrative offices at the Supreme Court of Appeal in Bloemfontein, but it may hear cases anywhere in South Africa. Cases are generally, but not necessarily, heard by all five members of the court.

== Mandate ==
The court has the power to review the procedural fairness of any decision taken by the IEC. It hears appeals on the correctness of any decision taken by the IEC if it involves the interpretation of the law, and answers questions of legal interpretation referred by the IEC. It also investigates allegations against members of the IEC.

The Electoral Court makes rules defining how disputes about the conduct of parties or candidates can be heard by the ordinary courts. It may also hear such disputes itself, but it cannot act as a criminal court.
