= Wallace Mgoqi =

South African activist (1949–2023)

Wallace Amos Mgoqi (7 June 1949 - 3 April 2023) was a South African attorney, businessman and activist.

== Early life ==
Mgoqi was born in Goodwood, a suburb of Cape Town. Under the Group Areas Act his family were moved to Nyanga township in 1955. The family moved to live with his grandparents in E-Thwathwa in the Kat River valley near the town of Seymor in the Eastern Cape.

He attended high school at Healdtown Comprehensive School in Fort Beaufort and studied for a degree in Social Science from Fort Hare University. At Fort Hare he became involved in the Black Consciousness Movement and, in his final year, was expelled along with his entire class after a student-led strike against poor-quality food - he refused to return to Fort Hare and subsequently completed his degree through UNISA.

== Career ==
Mgoqi returned to Cape Town in 1973 and became involved in assisting oppressed communities. He worked for organisations such as the Trust for Community Outreach (TCOE), the Western Province Council of Churches and the Cape Flats Committee for Interim Accommodation (CFCIA). In 1984 he graduated from the University of Cape Town with an LLB. He worked for the Legal Resources Centre and was admitted as an Attorney of the High Court of South Africa in 1988. He served as the Regional Land Claims Commissioner for the Western and Northern Cape Provinces from 1995. He became Chief Land Claims Commissioner in 1999. He served as an Acting Judge of the Land Claims Court on more than one occasion.

Mgoqi was a member of the African National Congress. From March 2003 to May 2006 he served as City Manager of the City of Cape Town. He was stripped of this position after a court case ruled that his term had been extended unlawfully by the outgoing ANC Mayor.

He then turned to business and served on the board of Old Mutual from 1995 to 2005. He also served on the boards of Syfrets, Safmarine and Safren. He became the Chairperson of Ayo Technology Solutions, a position he held until his death.

== Awards ==
- three honorary doctoral degrees (from UCT, New York University, and Walter Sisulu University)
- Ubuntu award at Western Cape (1993)
- Ithemba Civic Leadership Award (1998)
- Sir Sydney and Lady Felicia Kentridge Award from the General Council of the Bar in South Africa (2002)
- Duma Nokwe Human Rights Award by the Human Rights Commission (2004)

== Personal life ==
He married Dolly Radebe on 8 November 1974.

== Legacy ==
Uitkyk, near Kraaifontein in the Western Cape, changed the name of their settlement to Wallacedene in his honour in 1992. A street is also named after him at New Crossroads on the Cape Flats.

The Tata Wallace Foundation was set up in his honor.

== Writings ==
- Mgoqi, Wallace (2020). Living Beyond Apartheid
- Mgoqi, Wallace. Grace & Discipline, Life Under Apartheid
