= Bordeaux, Limpopo =

Bordeaux
- Location within Limpopo Location within South Africa
- Coordinates: 24.076°S 30.354°E
- Country: South Africa
- Province: Limpopo
- District: Mopani
- Municipality: Greater Tzaneen

Area
  - Total: 5.08 km^{2} (1.96 sq mi)

Population (2001)
  - Total: 425
  - Density: 83.7/km^{2} (217/sq mi)
- Time zone: UTC+2 (SAST)
- Postal code (street): n/a
- PO box: n/a

Bordeaux is a town in Mopani District Municipality in the Limpopo province of South Africa.
