= South African Human Rights Commission =

South African institution for the protection of democracy

South African Human Rights Commission (SAHRC)

National Institution overview
- Formed: 2 October 1995; 30 years ago
- Type: Chapter nine institution
- Jurisdiction: South Africa
- Headquarters: 27 Stiemens Street, Braamfontein
- Employees: 160
- Annual budget: R 1.37 billion (2026/27)
- National Institution executive: Chris Nissen, Chairperson
- Parent National Institution: None (Independent)
- Key documents: Constitution s.184; Human Rights Commission Act (Act 54 of 1994)
- Website: www.sahrc.org.za

The South African Human Rights Commission (SAHRC) is a South African independent statutory body that advocates for, monitors, and provides education on human rights issues. It also examines violations of human rights and seeks appropriate redress where necessary.

== History ==
The South African Human Rights Commission (SAHRC) was inaugurated in October 1995 as an independent chapter nine institution. It draws its mandate from the South African Constitution by way of the Human Rights Commission Act of 1994.

Over the years, it has held the government to constitutional standards and highlighted human rights abuses. It investigated the Life Esidimeni scandal, in which more than 140 psychiatric patients were harmed, and systemic failures exposed. It examined the Marikana massacre, in which striking miners were killed. It has also continued to report racism in schools, workplace discrimination, and systemic failures in delivering services.

== Functions and structure ==
The SAHRC is "the national institution established to support constitutional democracy". It advocates for human rights in South Africa. It also provides education and training on human rights issues. It also monitors the observance of human rights in the country, and addresses violations, seeking appropriate redress where necessary.

The core programmes of the SAHRC are:

- Legal Services Programme
- Research and Documentation
- Advocacy and Communications
- Parliamentary and International Affairs

The Parliamentary and International Affairs Unit lies within the Research Programme.

== Commissioners ==
A seven-year term is given to appointees.

=== 2009/2010 ===
Seven commissioners were appointed for a seven-year term in 2009/2010, namely Adv Lawrence Mushwana, Dr Pregaluxmi Govender, Ms Lindiwe Mokate, Adv Bokankatla Malatji, Adv Loyiso Mpumlwana, Ms Janet Love (part-time) and Dr Danfred Titus (part-time). Mushwana, who was previously the Public Protector, was elected Chairperson and Govender was elected Deputy Chairperson in October 2009. In July 2010, the National Assembly's justice committee decided unanimously that Mpumlwana's failure to disclose a civil judgement against him during the nomination process meant that he was not fit and proper to serve on the SAHRC.

In February 2014, Advocate Mohamed Shafie Ameermia was appointed commissioner focusing on housing and access to justice.

=== 2017 ===
For the seven-year term in 2017, Bongani Christopher Majola was appointed Chairperson of the South African Human Rights Commission, with Fatima Chohan the Deputy Chairperson. The full-time commissioners were Adv Bokankatla Joseph Malatji, Philile Ntuli, Adv Andre Hurtley Gaum, Matlhodi Angelina (Angie) Makwetla. The part-time commissioners were Adv Jonas Ben Sibanyoni and Christoffel Nissen.

=== 2025 ===
The SAHRC faced procedural challenges in filling vacant leadership positions during 2025. On 16 October 2025, the Portfolio Committee on Justice and Constitutional Development adopted a report recommending that the National Assembly begin the process of appointing a new commissioner from scratch, after the resignation of the Commission's vice-president, Fatma Chauhan, which took effect on 1 April 2024. Although Parliament reduced the list of candidates to eight names and interviewed them in November 2024, deliberations on 2 April 2025 led to an internal legal dispute. By its 28 May 2025 meeting, the committee announced its inability to agree on any candidate for the full-time commissioner or vice-president positions, ultimately recommending the cancellation and relaunch of the previous process to ensure the integrity of appointments.

=== Current commissioners ===
As of April 2026 Chris Nissen is chairperson (appointed January 2018). The full-time commissioners are:

- Philile Ntuli
- Tshepo Madlingozi (since 2024)
- Henk Boshoff (since January 2024)
- Elspeth Nomahlubi Berlinda Khwinana

Part-time commissioners are:

- Sandra Selokela Makoasha
- Aseza Arthur Gungubele

== Criticism and limitations ==
The commission has been involved in a number of controversies, ranging from accusations of racial double standards, promoting racist practices, political bias, and hosting a toxic work culture. In 2017 the trade union Solidarity criticised the commission for what it claims is racial bias and prejudice.

In 2019, complaints were laid at the SAHRC against EFF politician Julius Malema regarding several statements he had made. Malema has sung "kill the Boer" and had made racist remarks against Indian South Africans, accusing them of exploiting black people. In March 2019 the SAHRC stated that there was no basis in law for Malema's comments to be ruled as hate speech. Priscilla Jana, a commissioner responsible for race and equity issues, said in 2019 that the SAHRC is "purposefully lenient to black offenders in incidents concerning racial utterances made to white victims because of the historical context". In July 2023, the Johannesburg High Court set aside the SAHRC ruling that Malema's utterances at a 2016 gathering were not hate speech.

In 2024, SAHRC CEO Vusumuzi Mkhize was placed on precautionary suspension for making politically and racially disparaging remarks about the then newly-formed Government of National Unity in a hot mic incident.

The SAHRC has no legal power to compel action; it can only make recommendations, and its reports are therefore dependent on political will to carry out changes, which is often absent. Daily struggles that absorb the lives of ordinary South Africans may lead them to believe that constitutional rights are less relevant than the provision of basic services.
