= Peter Welz =

German artist

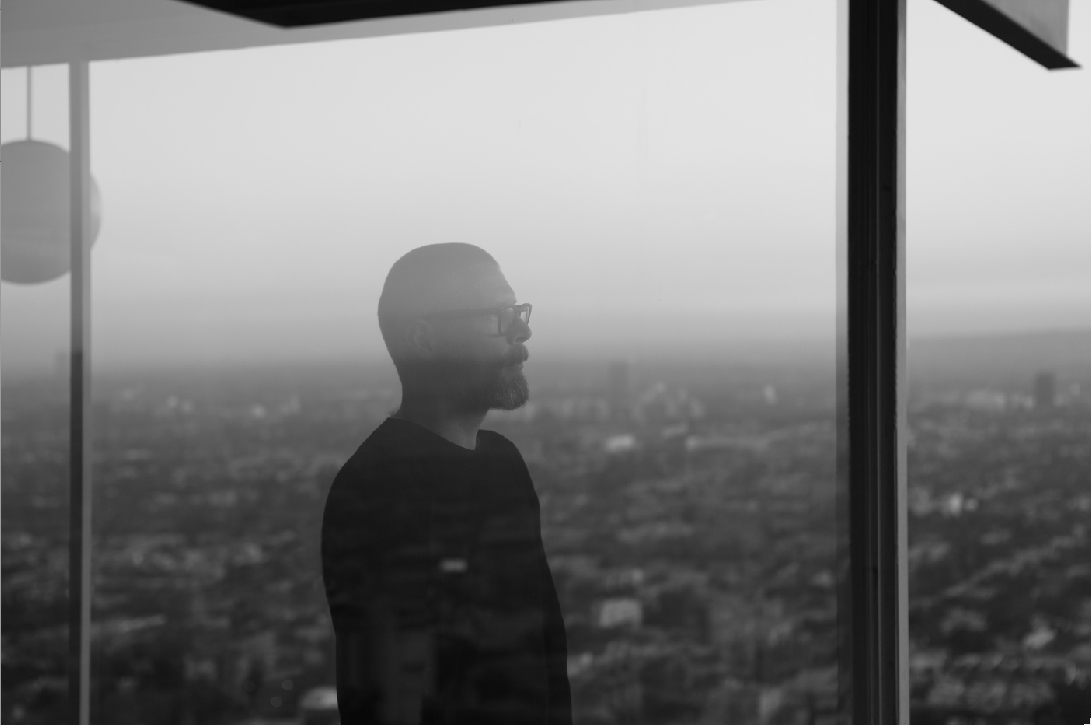
- Portrait (2013)
- Born: December 1, 1972 (age 53); Lauingen, West Germany
- Education: National College of Art and Design
- Known for: Contemporary Art
- Website: peterwelz.com

Peter Welz (born December 1, 1972, in Lauingen, West Germany) is a contemporary German artist based in Berlin. He has been exhibiting his work in video, sculpture and installations since 2003.

== Life and work ==
Welz was born in Lauingen, Germany, in 1972. In the 1990s he studied at the National College of Art and Design (Dublin), the Chelsea College of Arts (London) and at the Cooper Union (New York City).
His artistic works are on the one hand known for their kinetic experimental set-ups; on the other hand cinematic aspects play a central role. In addition to questions about the status of an image, the sculpture and the relationship between image and space are characteristics of his work in recent years. Welz' artistic work also reflects his confrontation with Samuel Beckett. He became known by a five-part video installation, which was developed in close collaboration with choreographer William Forsythe.

In 2020, Welz was one of 117 Berlin-based artists to be represented in the Berghain techno club’s Studio Berlin exhibition with the work Fuck Your Loneliness.
Works by Peter Welz are located in the Goetz Collection, the Falckenberg Collection, in the Collection of the Museum für Moderne Kunst in Frankfurt, and in the Paris Centre Pompidou.

== Studies and teaching ==
Peter Welz was educated at the National College of Art and Design (Dublin), Chelsea College of Art and Design (London) and Cooper Union (New York).He has taught at the Hochschule für Technik Stuttgart (Faculty of Architecture - Bachelor), the Università IUAV di Venezia Venezia (Faculty of Film and Architecture - Master) and the Virginia Commonwealth University Qatar (Faculty of Experimental Film, Video and Installation).

== Scholarships ==
- 2012 Artist-in-residence: Villa Aurora, Los Angeles, United States
- 2008 Artist-in-residence: Centro Cultural Andratx, Majorca, Spain
- 2007 MIT, List Visual Art Center, Boston, MA, US (AICA Awards, 2nd best thematic museum show)
- 2006 Förderpreis GASAG, Berlin, Germany
- 2005 Kaiserring Förderpreis, Museum für moderne Kunst, Goslar, Germany.
- 2003 Konrad Adenauer Stipendium, EHF, Konrad Adenauer Stiftung, Berlin, Germany
- 2003 Artist-in-residence: Irish Museum of Modern Art, Dublin, Ireland

== Artworks (selection) ==
=== Portrait 1: Retranslation | Last Unfinished Portrait (Francis Bacon) | Figure Inscribing a Figure ===
Portrait 1 “Retranslation | Last Unfinished Portrait (Francis Bacon) | Figure Inscribing a Figure” was presented in the exhibition “Corps étrangers” at the Musée du Louvre. In it, Peter Welz and William Forsythe examine the human figure and its relationship to space with an installation that mixes video projections, drawing and painting. The inspiration for the portrait was Francis Bacon's last unfinished self-portrait.

=== Portrait 2: Casa Malaparte ===
The “Casa Malaparte” is Peter Welz's second portrait. Due to the dialog it contains between two architectural icons, the Barcelona Pavilion and the Casa Malaparte, it is not a classic portrait. The installation approach transforms the architecture into a sculptural means of projection and mediates between the two buildings, allowing them to resonate and comment on each other.

=== Portrait 3: Outtake | Monica Vitti Sculpture ===
The third portrait “Outtake | Monica Vitti Sculpture” is a hybrid work between an architectural sculpture and a video installation. It is dedicated to the director Michelangelo Antonioni. His first color film “Red Dessert” is about a woman trying to survive in the modern world of cultural neuroses and existential doubts. The woman embodied by Monica Vitti is the subject of Portrait 3. The projected video sequence focuses on a very decisive moment in Red Desert, when Monica Vitti is asked to cry. It is the most vulnerable, private and powerless moment and the point at which the fictional reality intersects with the actual one. For the projection, Peter Welz uses a sculptural and architectural element made of steel, which is often used as a spatial element in modern architecture, and whose basic structure he takes from the Berlin Kino International, a premiere cinema in the former GDR.

=== Portrait 4: AA Bronson ===
AA Bronson, a Canadian artist, curator and co-founder of the artist collective General Idea, is the element of Peter Welz's fourth portrait. Bronson, standing alone in an undefined space, is orbited by planets. Occasionally we hear footsteps and the whirring of cameras. The two sequences are projected onto two monumental screens positioned at an angle in the exhibition space. The different perspectives of the cameras are understood in relation to each other, they converge and intertwine. The central staging of a single figure without narrative or scenic embedding is reminiscent of Andy Warhol's Screen Tests. Welz consciously follows this tradition and develops his own aesthetic and methodological approach.

=== Portrait 5: Douglas Gordon ===
Portrait 5 “Douglas Gordon | take 02” was recorded in Gordon's studio in 2021 with two iPhones. The two synchronized sequences of hands are positioned opposite each other in the room, reaching out to each other and bridging the fragmented body, mostly corresponding with each other in an uncontrolled dialogue, sometimes clapping in the air or hitting the studio floor. The sound emphasizes the performance in a disturbing way. The portrait was exhibited at the Casa degli Artisti in Milan.

== Exhibitions (selection) ==
- 2005 Mönchehaus Museum Goslar, Germany.
- 2005 Renaissance Society, Chicago, Illinois, US.
- 2006 Museum der Gegenwart, Hamburger Bahnhof, Berlin, Germany (kuratiert von Stan Douglas & Christopher Eamon).
- 2006 MIT, List Visual Art Center, Boston, Massachusetts, US.
- 2006 Louvre, Galerie de la Melpomène, Paris, France.
- 2007 Weserburg Museum für moderne Kunst, Bremen, Germany.
- 2009 National Gallery of Modern Art, Galleria Nazionale d’Arte Moderna, Rome, Italy.
- 2013 Aichi Triennale 2013, Nagoya, Japan.
- 2013 Municipal Museum of Art, Toyota, Aichi, Japan.
- 2013 National Museum of Modern Art, Tokyo (MOMAT), Japan.
- 2014 Galerie Crone: Ausstellung Malaparte, Berlin, Germany.
- 2014/15 Galleria Fumagalli: Portraits & Installations (November 14, 2014 – January 6, 2015), Milan, Italy.
- 2014/15 Weserburg Museum für moderne Kunst: Künstlerräume 02 (December 5, 2014 – May 31, 2015), Bremen, Germany.

== Artworks in public collections (selection) ==
- Centre Georges Pompidou, Paris, France.
- Museum für Moderne Kunst | MMK, Frankfurt, Germany.
- Galeria d’Arte Moderna | GAM, Torino, Italy..
- Lenbachhaus, Städtische Galerie, München, Germany.
- Deichtorhallen, Falckenberg Collection, Hamburg, Germany.
- Hoffmann Collection, Berlin, Germany.

== Awards and prizes ==
- 2006: Förderpreis Gasag, financial grant, Berlin, Germany.
- 2007: AICA Awards, 2nd best thematic museum show Boston-area, MIT List Visual Art Center, USA.

== Bibliography ==
- Carsten Ahrens ed.: Peter Welz | Weserburg | Museum für Moderne Kunst. Ausstellungskatalog, Heidelberg 2010, ISBN 978-3-86828-140-8.
- Peter Welz: TO UNSAY. Ausstellungskatalog, Goslar 2005.
