= Chapter nine institutions =

Chapter Nine Institutions refer to a group of organisations established in terms of Chapter 9 of the South African Constitution to guard democracy. The institutions are:

- the Public Protector
- the South African Human Rights Commission (SAHRC)
- the Commission for the Promotion and Protection of the Rights of Cultural, Religious and Linguistic Communities (CRL Rights Commission)
- the Commission for Gender Equality (CGE)
- the Auditor-General
- the Independent Electoral Commission (IEC)
- an Independent Authority to Regulate Broadcasting.

Though chapter nine calls for a broadcast regulator it does not specifically mandate the Independent Communications Authority of South Africa (ICASA). Interpretations vary on whether ICASA is a Chapter 9 institution or not.

== Parliamentary review ==
In October 2006, an ad hoc parliamentary committee was established to investigate the chapter nine bodies with regard to employment procedures and institutional governance. Also of concern was spending on the institutions and their lack of mandate to operate outside of the country. The committee recommended the establishment of a directorate, under the office of the Speaker, to liaise with the institutions.

== See also ==
- Constitutional body
