= Thuli Madonsela =

South African public lawyer and anti-apartheid activist (born 1962)

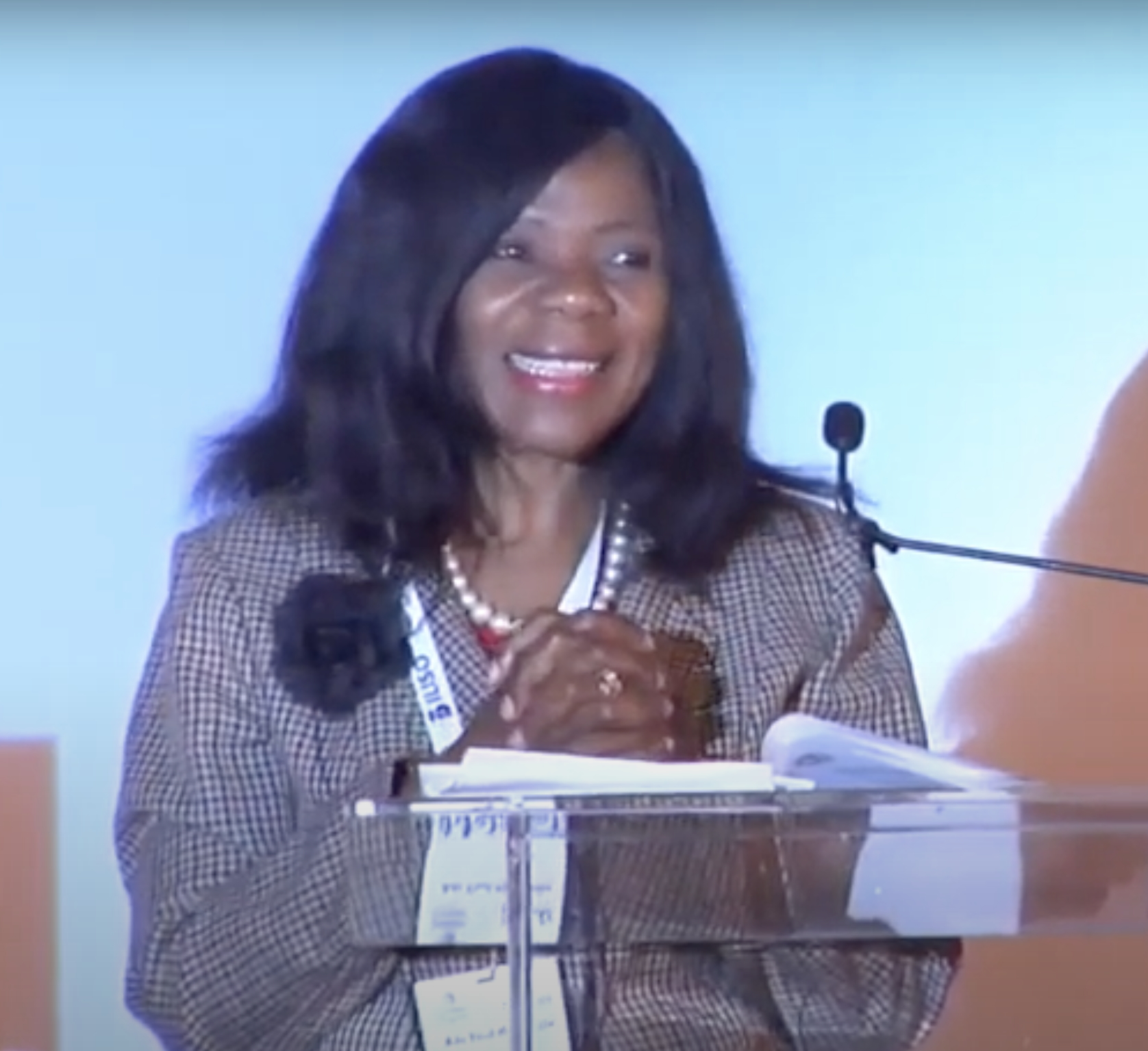

3rd Public Protector of South Africa
- In office 19 October 2009 – 14 October 2016
- Appointed by: President Jacob Zuma
- Deputy: Kevin Malunga
- Preceded by: Lawrence Mushwana
- Succeeded by: Busisiwe Mkhwebane

Personal details
- Born: Thulisile Nomkhosi Madonsela; 28 September 1962 (age 64) Johannesburg, Transvaal, Republic of South Africa
- Party: African National Congress
- Children: 2
- Education: University of Swaziland; University of the Witwatersrand
- Occupation: Ombudsman; lawyer; law professor; anti-apartheid activist

Professor Thulisile Nomkhosi "Thuli" Madonsela (born 28 September 1962) is a South African advocate and professor of law, holding a chair in social justice at Stellenbosch University since January 2018. She served as the Public Protector of South Africa from 19 October 2009 to 14 October 2016. In 1996, she helped draft the final constitution of South Africa promulgated by then-President Nelson Mandela.

== Early life and education ==
Madonsela was born in Johannesburg in 1962, the daughter of informal traders Bafana and Nomasonto, and grew up in Soweto. She attended Evelyn Baring High School in Nhlangano in Swaziland, from where her family originates. She graduated with a BA in Law from the University of Swaziland in 1987, and an LLB from the University of the Witwatersrand in 1990. In March 2015, Madonsela was awarded a Doctor of Laws degree, LL.D. (Honoris causa) from the University of Stellenbosch, followed by another Doctor of Laws degree, LL.D. (honoris causa) from the University of Cape Town in June 2015. She also has honorary doctorates from Rhodes University and the University of Fort Hare.

== Politics ==
Madonsela was, until 2007, an ordinary member of the Pretoria branch of the African National Congress (ANC). During the apartheid era Madonsela served in the ANC and in the United Democratic Front anti-apartheid organisation. She believes that holding political office would not be her "best contribution as a human being". In 1994 she declined the position of ANC MP in South Africa's first post-apartheid Parliament. In January 2014 it was reported that several ANC branches in Gauteng had unsuccessfully nominated her as a candidate to represent the ANC in the National Assembly or one of the provincial legislatures in the 2014 general election. Her spokesperson said she was unaware of the nomination and would not have accepted it.

== Early career ==
Madonsela worked for trade unions and in both the public and private sectors from the 1980s. She was a member of the team who drafted the final constitution of South Africa promulgated by then President Nelson Mandela in 1996. After Mandela's death, Madonsela said in a tribute to him: "We will always admire him for gladly submitting his administration to the scrutiny of checks and balances such as the courts and institutions supporting democracy when its actions came into question." Prior to her appointment as Public Protector, Madonsela served as a full-time member of the South African Law Reform Commission, appointed to the position in 2007 by then President Thabo Mbeki.

== Public Protector ==
Madonsela was appointed Public Protector by President Jacob Zuma for a non-renewable seven-year term commencing 19 October 2009, with unanimous support from the multi-party National Assembly. At the announcement of her appointment, Zuma said Madonsela "will need to ensure that this office continues to be accessible to ordinary citizens and undertakes its work without fear or favour". Madonsela likens her role as Public Protector to the Venda chief's paternal aunt known as the makhadzi, a non-political figure who "gives the people a voice while giving the traditional leader a conscience".

In 2012, she investigated "kickbacks" received by Julius Malema in the context of traffic department contracts given to external contractor On-Point Engineering.

=== "Secure in Comfort" report ===
As Public Protector, Madonsela investigated complaints regarding public spending on Zuma's private homestead in the KwaZulu-Natal town of Nkandla. Her final report on security upgrades to Zuma's homestead titled Secure in Comfort was published on 19 March 2014. Madonsela found that Zuma had benefited unduly from the R246 million the state had spent on the upgrades. Her report has been met with much criticism and opposition from representatives of the ANC ruling party. Shortly before her final report was made public, ANC secretary general Gwede Mantashe and cabinet minister Lindiwe Sisulu made public statements undermining Madonsela and her report, with Mantashe calling it a "political report". After its publication, the African National Congress Youth League (ANCYL) called for Madonsela's resignation, and members of the ANCYL and the ANC-aligned Congress of South African Students (COSAS) made disparaging remarks about her. COSAS, which had been admonished by female cabinet minister Nosiviwe Mapisa-Nqakula for a "sexist" remark, subsequently retracted "a personal address to comrade Madonsela". ANC chief whip Stone Sizani said "we strongly believe that she has overstepped the mark" by making some "disparaging remarks" with "political overtones". A group of lawyers from KwaZulu-Natal started a public campaign to discredit her report, and she was accused of having a political agenda by cabinet minister Fikile Mbalula. On 4 July 2014, ANC MPs in the justice portfolio committee objected to Madonsela's "views that are political in nature" and committee chairperson Mathole Motshekga suggested that the powers of the Public Protector, which are governed by the country's constitution, be reviewed.

Zuma made a submission to Parliament on 14 August 2014 regarding Madonsela's report on Nkandla. Madonsela wrote a letter to Zuma dated 21 August 2014, stating that his submission to Parliament was not an adequate response to her report and requesting a response to her letter by 4 September 2014. During a media briefing on 26 August 2014, Gwede Mantashe criticised her handling of the matter, saying the ANC want her to "behave correctly" and "not abuse" her term of office, while his deputy Jessie Duarte expressed concerns about Madonsela being "populist in her orientation". Madonsela subsequently held a press conference on 28 August 2014, in which she defended her actions and requested those ANC members interfering with her duties to stop doing so. The same day, civil rights organisation AfriForum laid criminal charges against Mantashe and Duarte for contravening the Public Protector Act by insulting the Public Protector. The general secretary of ANC Tripartite Alliance partner COSATU Zwelinzima Vavi and general secretary of its largest affiliate NUMSA Irvin Jim subsequently defended Madonsela and criticised the ANC's response. Madonsela later elaborated to the media that her letter to Zuma complements the parallel parliamentary process, "because finally they would have the president's comments on my report. But now they only have the president's own initiative, which is a general statement on his observations on what happened there, but he's not saying whether he agrees or disagrees with me. He is not saying what he is going to do to fix his branch of government." On 6 September 2014, deputy Minister of Defence and Military Veterans Kebby Maphatsoe publicly accused Madonsela of "acting like a counter-revolutionary" and working for the CIA. Madonsela said she would charge Maphatsoe with contempt if he does not retract his accusations. The ANC distanced itself from Maphatsoe's statements and he publicly withdrew them on 9 September 2014. In a written response sent to Madonsela on 11 September 2014, Zuma disagreed with her understanding of her authority in the matter.

Opposition parties Economic Freedom Fighters and Democratic Alliance approached the Constitutional Court to enforce Madonsela's findings after they were ignored by Zuma and dismissed in Parliament. On 31 March 2016, the Constitutional Court delivered a unanimous judgement stating that the Public Protector's report was binding and Zuma and the National Assembly failed to uphold the country's constitution. The court ordered the National Treasury to determine the amount that Zuma must pay back, and ordered Zuma to do so within 45 days of the court's approval of the National Treasury report.

=== "State of Capture" report ===
Madonsela's final report, "State of Capture", was released as her 7-year term of office came to an end in October 2016. Her report was a result of the complaint submitted by a Catholic priest, Father Stanslaus Muyebe. The report found evidence of state capture, including the Gupta family's improper influence over President Jacob Zuma. Madonsela directed the president to appoint a judicial commission of inquiry, headed by a judge named by the chief justice. Zuma called the report "political propaganda" and challenged it in court, but the High Court dismissed the challenge in December 2017, finding that Zuma must implement the remedial actions within 30 days, and making a personal costs order against Zuma.

== Other activities ==
In 2018 Madonsela was awarded Germany's highest individual honour, the Order of Merit of the Federal Republic of Germany, by German president Frank-Walter Steinmeier during his state visit to South Africa. Steinmeier stated "Thuli Madonsela, you teach us how resilient a democracy actually is if we determinedly defend its principles. In this, you are an example to all us democrats."

In 2023, Madonsela was appointed by United Nations Secretary General António Guterres to the United Nations' Scientific Advisory Board.

== Personal life ==
Madonsela raised her two children, a boy Musawabantu Fidel and a girl, Wenzile Una as a single parent. Her husband died when the children were very young. In 1980, Madonsela began her career as an assistant teacher at her former school, Evelyn Baring High School, in Swaziland. In 1982 she became an assistant teacher at Naledi High School in Soweto, one of the schools at the center of the 1976 Soweto Uprising. In late July 2018, it was revealed that Madonsela was engaged to Dick Foxton, a public relations consultant.

In 2017 it was revealed that Foxton's consulting company, Foxton Communications, had previously been contracted by SABC CEO Hlaudi Motsoeneng "to be the spokesperson and publicist of the Group CEO despite the fact that the SABC had its own internal spokesperson. The company was paid a R350 000.00 per month retainer plus additional fees". Motsoeneng was identified in the State Capture Inquiry as one of the individuals improperly appointed by President Zuma. In response to a parliamentary question in 2018, the Minister of Communications confirmed that the Special Investigating Unit had initiated court proceedings against a number of companies, including Foxton Communications.

== Honours and recognition ==
- 2011 – Daily Maverick named her South African Person of the Year for "serving her role as an ombudsman to the exercise of executive power with unwavering commitment to truth".
- 2014 – Time magazine named her one of the 100 most influential people in the world in the Leaders category and described her as "an inspirational example of what African public officers need to be".
- 2014 – Glamour Women of the Year awards – named Woman of Courage
- 2014 – ANN7 South African of the Year
- 2014 – Transparency International Integrity Award
- 2015 – Doctor of Law (honoris causa), University of Fort Hare (2013), Stellenbosch University (March), Rhodes University (April) and University of Cape Town (June)
- 2016 – FW de Klerk Goodwill Award
- 2016 – Forbes African Person of the year
- 2016 – Chosen as one of the BBC's 100 Women
- 2016 – German Africa Prize
- 2018 – Order of Merit of the Federal Republic of Germany
- 2019 – Diakonia Award

== Publications ==
- Madonsela, Thuli (1995). "Beyond Putting Women on the Agenda". Agenda. 11 (24): 27–38. doi:10.2307/4065890. JSTOR 4065890.
- Madonsela, Thuli (1995). "A fair deal for the woman worker?". In Liebenberg, Sandra (ed.). The Constitution of South Africa from a gender perspective. Cape Town: Community Law Centre at the University of the Western Cape in association with David Philip. ISBN 9780620196567.
- Maluleke, Mikateko Joyce; Madonsela, Thuli (2004). Women and the law in South Africa: Gender equality jurisprudence in landmark court decisions (PDF). Department of Justice and Constitutional Development.
- Madonsela, Thuli (September 2012). "Corruption" (PDF). Quarterly Roundtable (24): 8–13. Archived from the original (PDF) on 4 September 2014.
- Madonsela, Thuli (19 March 2014). Secure in Comfort (PDF). Public Protector South Africa. ISBN 9781920692155. Archived from the original (PDF) on 4 January 2015.

Preceded by Lawrence Mushwana	Public Protector; 2009–2016	Succeeded by Busisiwe Mkhwebane
