= Martin Welz =

South African journalist (born 1945)

Martin Sylvester Welz (born 19 October 1945) is a South African journalist and the editor of Noseweek magazine, known for his investigative work on controversial issues such as government and corporate corruption.

== Early life ==
Martin Welz was born on 19 October 1945 in Worcester, Western Cape, South Africa. He was the fourth son of artist Jean Welz, born in Salzburg, Austria, in 1900. His mother, Inger Marie Welz (née Christensen), was born in Odense, Denmark, in 1908.

== Career ==
=== Sunday Times ===
A report by Welz while he was working for the Sunday Times from 1977–1981 saw an R180-million defamation claim instituted against himself and the paper by Lebanese businessman, Salim el Hajj. El Hajj had been accused by Welz of a series of frauds in the then Bantustans (black 'homelands') and had fled the country before the case got to court. Welz also worked on South Africa's "Muldergate" information scandal and helped expose wrongdoings by apartheid-era cabinet ministers, amongst other things, revealing that both Minister of Manpower and Energy Fanie Botha and State President Nico Diederichs were secretly bankrupt while in office.

In 1981–82, Welz was appointed Parliamentary correspondent for Sunday Express, Johannesburg. While at the Express, he won the Stellenbosch farmers' Winery Award in 1983 for a series, exposing the corrupt pharmaceutical empire established by businessmen Isaac Kay and David Tabatznik.

=== Noseweek ===
Noseweek was founded in Cape Town, South Africa, in June 1993. It contained a minimal amount of advertising and mainly relied on sales.

== Lawsuits ==
=== Dr. Robert Milton Hall ===
The first lawsuit against the magazine was brought in 1994 by Dr. Robert Milton Hall, an American living in Stellenbosch, Western Cape. The trial was in 1996 in the Cape High Court before Judge Johann Conradie. Noseweek had made allegations against Dr. Hall.

The magazine was represented by a legal team, while Welz represented himself. Noseweek and Welz won the case. Judge Johann Conradie presided and in his judgment found that Dr. Hall had, "... sued not to salvage his reputation but to sustain a colossal fraud." This litigation put the magazine on ice for approximately two years and nearly bankrupted it. It was later relaunched thanks to the voluntary contributions of its readers.

=== FirstRand Bank ===
In 2007, Welz represented himself in a court action brought by the FirstRand group to prevent Noseweek from publishing information about FirstRand clients. The action was dismissed with costs.

=== Inge Peacock ===
Cape Town businesswoman, Inge Peacock, sued Noseweek and Martin Welz in March 2012. Judge Andre Le Grange of the Cape High Court dismissed Peacock's case with costs, but stated that the plaintiff may pursue damages for defamation against Noseweek.

==== Weapons whistleblower ====
In 2008, Welz reported that a ship due to dock in Durban harbour carried a shipment of Chinese weapons bound for Zimbabwe. News of the $1.245 million, 77-ton shipment came via what Welz described as "a whistleblower of conscience," who supplied Noseweek with documentation for the shipment.

== Awards ==
- South African Union of Journalists Thomas Pringle Award for Press Freedom.
- Special mention, 2002 Nat Nakasa Award for Media Integrity & Courageous Journalism.
- Joint business category winner, 2004 Mondi Paper Magazine Awards.
- Honorary award for promoting corporate governance through investigative journalism, 2007 Sanlam Financial Journalist of the Year competition.
