= Jean Welz =

South African artist

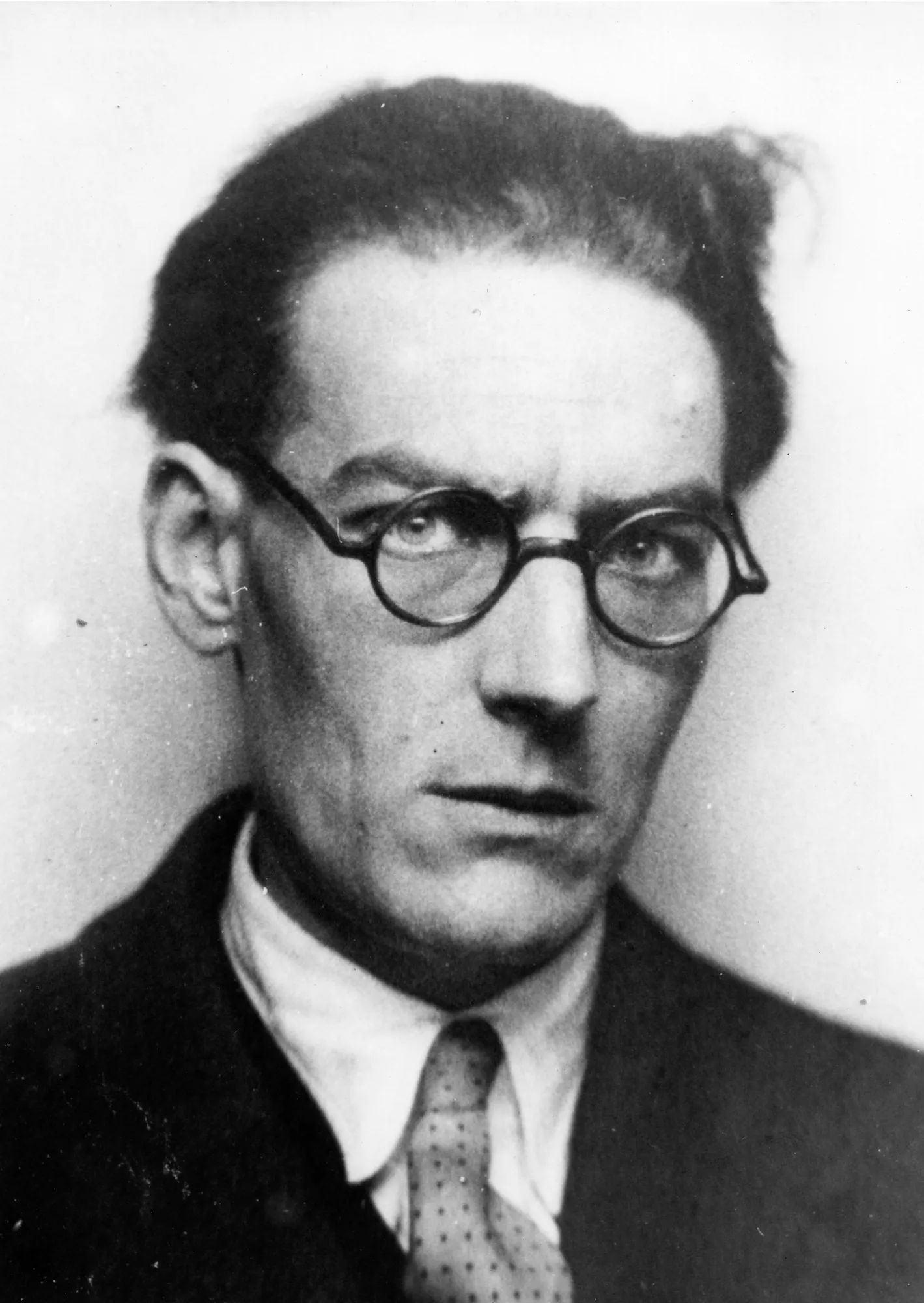
- Born: Johan Max Friedrich Welz; 4 March 1908; Salzburg, Austria
- Died: 24 December 1975 (aged 67); Cape Town, South Africa
- Education: Central School of Art and Design
- Known for: Watercolour, oil painting
- Movement: New Group (South Africa)

Jean Welz (4 March 1908 – 24 December 1975) was an Austrian - born South African artist. He became a prominent architect.

== Biography ==
Johann Max Friedrich Welz was born in Salzburg, Austria, in 1900, into a family in the picture-framing and gilding trade. Called Hans in his youth, he studied art and architecture, and in 1925 traveled to Paris, and worked with prominent modern architects producing a handful of villas of his own until 1937. It was during this period that he adopted the name Jean.

In 1937 Welz emigrated to South Africa with his wife the Danish journalist, Inger Christensen, and their young son, and began work as an architect at the University of the Witwatersrand, where he designed the entrance foyer of the Great Hall and the Institute for Geophysical Research. In 1939 he became ill with tuberculosis and moved with his family to Barrydale in the Little Karoo, where he and his family operated a tea-room.

In 1941 Welz became principal of the Hugo Naudé Art Centre in Worcester, Western Cape, remaining in Worcester for 28 years. He held his first exhibitions in Stellenbosch and Cape Town in 1942, and the same year became a member of the New Group of South African artists, a loose association of mostly younger artists.

Welz was a successful and influential artist until he again became ill in 1968. His health deteriorated and he died in 1975. One of his sons, Martin Welz, is a well-known South African investigative journalist. Another, Stephan Welz, was an art dealer.

== Career ==
Welz came to Paris without any official licensing but found work with architects Robert Mallet-Stevens and Adolf Loos. Welz was heavily involved in Loos' Tzara House (1926) and Loos introduced him to Robert Fisher as a talented designer. Although Fisher was a fan of Loos' modern approach, he relied on Welz to put the theories into practice and gave him free rein of Maison Dubin (1928). Fisher, unlike many architects depending on a junior, allowed Welz to take much of the credit and the building was right next door to Le Corbusier's Villa Cook (1926).

Welz exhibited widely from 1942 until his last major exhibition in 1970. In 1947 he was awarded the Silver Medal of the South African Academy for Arts and Science for his picture Earthenware and cupboard door. In 1969 the South African Academy for Arts and Science awarded him the Medal of Honour for painting.

== Architecture ==
- 1928 Maison Dubin, with Raymond Fisher, Boulogne-Billancourt, France
- 1930 Laura Marx(Karl's daughter) gravestone, Paris, France - destroyed by Nazi's 1940
- 1931 Villa Landau, Epinay-sur-Seine. France - now functions as the Maison de Justice et du Droit
- 1932 Villa Darmstadter, Vaucresson, France
- 1933 Maison Zilveli, Paris, France - currently under extensive restoration, may not be saved.
- 1937 Austrian Pavilion Proposal, Paris, France (project)

== Exhibitions ==
- 1942 First one-man show, Cape Town.
- 1942 South African Academy New Group Art Exhibitions.
- 1948 Overseas exhibition of South African Art, Tate Gallery
- 1952 Van Riebeeck Tercentenary Exhibition, Venice Biennale.
- 1953 Rhodes Centenary Exhibition.
- 1957 São Paulo Biennale.
- 1966 Republic Fest Exhibition, Pretoria.
- 1970 Prestige Retrospective Exhibition, South African National Art Gallery and Johannesburg Art Gallery.
