= Public Protector =

Independent state institution of South Africa

Office of the Public Protector (OPP)

National Institution overview
- Formed: 1 October 1995; 30 years ago
- Preceding National Institution: The Office of the Ombudsman
- Type: Chapter nine institution
- Jurisdiction: Government
- Headquarters: 175 Lunnon Street, Hillcrest Office Park, 0083, Pretoria, South Africa; 25.757869°S 28.240425°E
- Annual budget: R 2.4 billion (2026/27)
- National Institution executive: Adv Nompilo Kholeka Gcaleka, Public Protector; Deputy Public Protector
- Parent National Institution: None (independent)
- Key documents: Constitution of the Republic of South Africa Act 108 of 1996; Public Protector Act 23 of 1994; Executive Members Ethics Act 82 of 1998; Promotion of Access to Information Act 2 of 2000 (PAIA); Electoral Commission Act 51 of 1996; Special Investigation Units and Special Tribunals Act 74 of 1996
- Website: www.pprotect.org

The Public Protector in South Africa is one of six independent state institutions set up by the country's Constitution to support and defend democracy.

According to Section 181 of the Constitution:

- These institutions are independent, and subject only to the Constitution and the law. According to the Constitution, they must be impartial and must exercise their powers and perform their functions without fear, favour or prejudice.
- Other organs of state, through legislative and other measures, must assist and protect these institutions to ensure the independence, impartiality, dignity and effectiveness of these institutions.
- No person or organ of state may interfere with the functioning of these institutions.
- These institutions are accountable to the National Assembly, and must report on their activities and the performance of their functions to the Assembly at least once a year.

== Public Protectors ==
The first person to hold the office was Selby Baqwa, appointed on the inception of the office in 1995. He was succeeded in 2002 by Lawrence Mushwana, in 2009 by Thuli Madonsela and in 2016 by Busisiwe Mkhwebane. The current Public Protector is Kholeka Gcaleka, in office since 9 June 2022 as Acting Public Protector following the suspension of Public Protector Busisiwe Mkhwebane. President Cyril Ramaphosa formally appointed Gcaleka for her seven-year term as Public Protector on 1 November 2023.

The office of the Public protector has been faced with harsh criticism by parliament specifically by the majority party for requesting an increase of R200m in the budget allocation for additional resources. With the justice portfolio committee chairman Mathole Motshekga being critical of the budget and strategic presentation presented by Adv. Thuli Madonsela.

During the budget speech of 2015 the office of the Public Protector was allocated a total budget for 2015/16 of R 246.1 million an increase of R 60 million as opposed to the increase of R 200 million initially requested, with R 15 million going to the employment of additional investigators and the retention of the 70 investigators who were previously appointed on contract.

The office of the Public Protector is required to appear before the National Assembly at least once every year. During the Adv. Thuli Madonsela's budget and strategic presentation, the advocate was requested to present progress reports before parliament on a quarterly basis.

On 9 June 2022, President Cyril Ramaphosa announced that he is suspending Busisiwe Mkhwebane from her duties as the Public Protector in terms of Section 194 of the Constitution which allowed for the suspension of the Public Protector while an impeachment inquiry was under way. On 11 September 2023, National Assembly voted to impeach Busisiwe Mkhwebane, with 318 in support, 43 against and one abstention; her removal comes a month prior to the end of a 7-year non-renewable term.

On 1 November 2023, the president appointed Kholeka Gcaleka as the 5th Public Protector in terms of Section 193. She was previously acting Public Protector since Mkhwebane was suspended in June 2022.

=== Public Protectors (1995–present) ===
No.	Name (Birth–Death)	Portrait	Took office	Left office	Appointed by
1	Selby Baqwa (1951–)		1 October 1995	30 September 2002	Nelson Mandela
2	Lawrence Mushwana (1948–)		1 October 2002	18 October 2009	Thabo Mbeki
3	Thuli Madonsela (1962–)		19 October 2009	14 October 2016	Jacob Zuma
4	Busisiwe Mkhwebane (1970–)		19 October 2016	9 June 2022 (suspended) 11 September 2023 (impeached)	Jacob Zuma
5	Kholeka Gcaleka (1982–)		1 November 2023 (Previously, acting since 9 June 2022)	Incumbent	Cyril Ramaphosa

== Organisational structure ==
The Public Protector has an executive office which administers three major programmes:

- The Investigations and Outreach
- The Executive Management
- The Corporate Support Services

== Mandate ==
The Public Protector receives its mandate from the Public Protector Act of 1994. The Public Protector is one of six State Institutions Supporting Democracy in South Africa. These institutions are independent of the government, subject only to South Africa's Constitution and the law, and report annually to Parliament.

The preamble of the Public Protector Act states, in part:

The Constitution of the Republic of South Africa ... provides for the establishment of the office of Public Protector to investigate matters and to protect the public against matters such as maladministration in connection with the affairs of government, improper conduct by a person performing a public function, improper acts with respect to public money, improper or unlawful enrichment of a person performing a public function and an act or omission by a person performing a public function resulting in improper prejudice to another person.

The Act also gives the Public Protector the authority to order other state institutions to take appropriate remedial action against any impropriety or prejudice made by government.

Any aggrieved complainant may lodge a complaint to the office provided that it falls within powers of the Public Protector in terms of the Public Protector act 23 of 1994. The Public Protector may investigate and take the appropriate remedial action on his/her findings.

== History ==
The Public Protector is one of six State Institutions Supporting Democracy in South Africa. These institutions are independent of the government, subject only to South Africa's Constitution and the law, and report annually to Parliament.

== Functions of the Public Protector ==
The powers of the Public Protector are regulated by the national legislation. Additional powers may also be granted by the national legislator. However, court decisions may not be investigated by the office. It receives and investigates complaints from the public government. Some functions include (but are not limited to):

- The power to investigate any conduct of government or administration that is seen as improper/ prejudiced.
- Their main objective is to defend democracy and its citizens. They are seen as an independent state institution.
- They report to the National Assembly (NA) at least once a year.
- They protect and enforce constitutional obligations.
- Anyone may access or lay a complaint to the public protector for inadequate or corrupt services by government employees.
- They do not deal with complaints against the judiciary.

== Appointment ==
The Public Protector is appointed by the president, in accordance with the provisions of section 193 of the Constitution. The candidate must be a South African citizen who-

"

- is a Judge of a High Court; or
- is admitted as an advocate or an attorney and has, for a cumulative period of at least 10 years after having been so admitted, practised as an advocate or an attorney; or
- is qualified to be admitted as an advocate or an attorney and has, for a cumulative period of at least 10 years after having so qualified, lectured in law at a university; or
- has specialised knowledge of or experience, for a cumulative period of at least 10 years, in the administration of justice, public administration or public finance; or
- has, for a cumulative period of at least 10 years, been a member of Parliament.

" – Sub-s. (1A) Act 23 of 1994

=== Tenure ===
Under chapter nine of the constitution, the Public Protector may only serve a non-renewable period of seven years in office.

== Investigation Reports ==
Reports made by the Public Protector must be open to the public and be accessible to anyone. However certain reports may be kept confidential under exceptional circumstances. The Public Protector has to date investigated at least 40 000 cases.

One of the most prominent cases is the investigation into allegations of impropriety and unethical conduct relating to the installation and implementation of security measures by the Department of Public Works at and in respect of the private residence of President Jacob Zuma at Nkandla in the KwaZulu-Natal province

== Jurisdiction ==
Any matters in which the Public Protector has jurisdiction may be reported to the office of the Public Protector by any person.

In terms of the Public Protector Act 23 of 1994 and other legislative acts, the Public Protector may investigate, on the basis of a complaint or on his or her own initiative, any level of government. This includes national, provincial and local government, any public office bearer, any parastatal and any statutory council.

== Relationship with other chapter nine institutions ==
Similar to other bodies under the Chapter nine institution under the Constitution, the office of the Public Protector is independent of government and must be impartial and must exercise their powers and perform their function without any influence or prejudice.

== Budget ==
Currently the office of the Public Protector manages an estimate of 40,000 cases, with a staff of 314. During the 2013/14 budget, the office was allocated R199.3m, with an increase of R18.3m for the 2014/15 financial year.

During the budget of 2015, the office was allocated an additional increase of R60m instead of the R200m initially requested at the justice portfolio committee. As a result, the office of the Public Protector was required to make drastic cutbacks.

As a result of the funding difficulties, the spokesman of the office the Public Protector office cited that they would look at external agencies to help fund the office. The executive management of the office of the Public Protector has held meetings with development partners from Germany, Japan and Belgium.
