= Amina Desai =

South African political prisoner

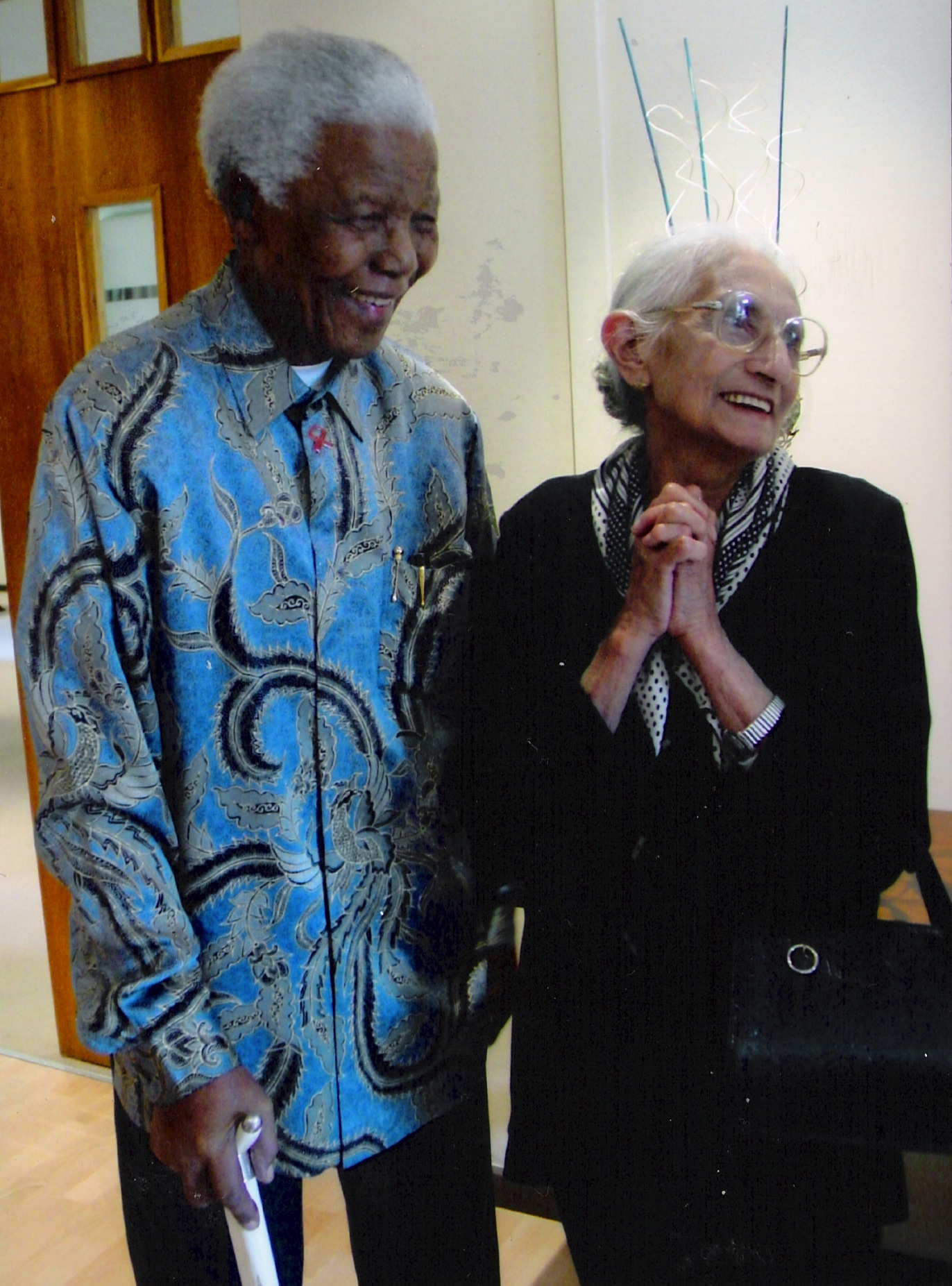
- Amina Desai with Nelson Mandela

Amina Desai (c. 1920 – 10 June 2009) was South Africa's longest serving female Indian political prisoner.

In 1996, aged 76, she was a witness for the Truth and Reconciliation Commission.

In 2013 she was posthumously awarded South Africa's national Order of Luthuli in silver.

== Arrest and incarceration ==
Amina was arrested and accused by the apartheid government of conspiring with her lodger, Ahmed Timol, (who was arrested just days before) to further the aims of the then-illegal African National Congress. Following Timol’s arrest, on 23 October 1971, at 3 am, in the early hours of the morning, the Security Police raided Desai’s home. She was then taken to the notorious John Vorster Square prison in Johannesburg, where she was interrogated for the next four days.

One afternoon, she heard furniture being thrown about in the next room, followed by screams. It was the “most terrible moment of my life” she told the Truth and Reconciliation Commission (TRC) in 1996. Later, it emerged that Timol had fallen from the tenth floor window of the John Vorster Square prison. The police claimed that Timol had jumped to his death.

Desai was kept in solitary confinement for several months after Timol’s death, and was sentenced to five years under the Terrorism Act for furthering the aims of the African National Congress (ANC) and the South African Communist Party (SACP) in that November 1972.

On the first day of her trial, she suggested to her lawyer that he contact Timol who would be able to shed light on the literature found in her car. It was only then that she learnt of Timol’s death.

She served most of her sentence alongside the longtime ANC stalwart Dorothy Nyembe, and for a short while with Winnie Mandela, whose defiance and courage she greatly admired. After five years imprisonment at Barberton and Kroonstad Prisons, she was released in 1978; by then she was South Africa's longest-serving Indian woman political prisoner, and was placed under a banning order and house arrest for a further five years.

== Personal life ==
Born Amina Nagdee in South Africa, she was one of nine children of a Malay mother and Indian father. She was obliged to leave school aged 10 to look after her younger siblings. Intent on becoming a nurse, she enrolled herself in a school for midwifery, until she was unceremoniously taken home by her father five days later, who deemed it an unsuitable profession. She persisted with her education, however, and was eventually allowed to study at Harvard College, in Johannesburg, which at the time was "whites only". Amina became the only non-white student, attaining qualifications in typing, commerce and shorthand.

In 1943 she married Suleiman Desai. He was a key member of the Transvaal Indian Congress, then engaged in a passive resistance campaign against the apartheid government. Desai was also owner of an agency for Watson's shoes, a large local brand; when he died in 1969, Amina immediately assumed control of her husband's business, undeterred by being a woman in a male-dominated profession, and ran it successfully for the next 35 years.

She left South Africa in 2004, as failing health brought her to live with her children in the United Kingdom and Ireland, where they had sought refuge from apartheid in the 1970s. Amina died peacefully in Dublin in 2009.

Musician Kindness (real name Adam Bainbridge) is her grandchild.
