= Janet Love =

South African politician and civil servant

Member of the National Assembly
- In office 9 May 1994 – 1 August 1999

Personal details
- Born: 21 December 1957 (age 68) Johannesburg, Transvaal; Union of South Africa
- Party: African National Congress (formerly)
- Education: Wits University

Janet Yetta Love (born 21 December 1957) is a South African civil servant, activist and former politician who has served as vice-chairperson of the Electoral Commission of South Africa since 2018. Before her appointment to the Electoral Commission in 2016, she was a part-time commissioner at the South African Human Rights Commission from 2009 to 2016. She was also director of the Legal Resources Centre from 2006 to 2018.

During apartheid, Love was a member of Umkhonto we Sizwe and worked for the African National Congress (ANC) in exile, ultimately as an officer for Operation Vula. She represented the ANC at the negotiations to end apartheid and subsequently served in an ANC seat in the National Assembly from 1994 to 1999, when she entered the civil service. She was a member of the National Executive Committee of the ANC from 2007 to 2010.

== Early life and activism ==
Love was born in Johannesburg on 21 December 1957. Her parents had emigrated to South Africa in 1949: her mother, Dora Rabinowitz, was Jewish and a survivor of Stutthof concentration camp, while her father, Frank Love, had been a British soldier. Love completed a bachelor's degree in political science and industrial sociology from Wits University, as well as postgraduate diplomas from Wits and from the University of London.

While at Wits, she was a member of the student representative council and was active in the anti-apartheid National Union of South African Students and its wages commission. In 1975, she was recruited into the informal underground of the African National Congress (ANC), then banned inside South Africa. She left the country in late 1977, during the repressive state crackdown that followed the Soweto uprising; though only intending to leave for a brief sojourn, she remained in exile for the next decade, joining Umkhonto we Sizwe and working for the overseas missions of the ANC and South African Congress of Trade Unions.

In 1987, she was smuggled back into South Africa in order to join the ANC's new and covert Operation Vula. Based in Johannesburg, she was the main communications officer for Vula, and after the Security Branch uncovered the operation in 1990, she went into hiding to avoid arrest. At the Truth and Reconciliation Commission, Love sought and received amnesty for her involvement in Vula's unlawful possession and distribution of arms. From 1991, she was a member of the ANC's delegation to the negotiations that ended apartheid, and she was a member of the management team at the Convention for a Democratic South Africa.

== Post-apartheid career ==
In South Africa's first democratic elections in 1994, Love was elected to represent the ANC in the National Assembly, the lower house of the new South African Parliament. She was a member of the 22-member Constitutional Committee that steered the process of drafting the post-apartheid Constitution, and she also chaired the Portfolio Committee on Agriculture, Water Affairs and Forestry. She was re-elected to a second term in the assembly in the 1999 general election, but she resigned from her seat with effect from 1 August 1999.

She subsequently entered the civil service, serving as special adviser to Ronnie Kasrils at the Ministry of Water Affairs and Forestry; according to the Mail & Guardian, her influence was such that she was referred to in the ministry and department as Kasrils's "deputy minister". She later spent five years as a manager at the South African Reserve Bank, leading strategic analysis in the currency department. In 2006, though not herself a lawyer, she was appointed as national director of the Legal Resources Centre, South Africa's largest public interest law firm, known for its pro bono work.

Ahead of the ANC's 52nd National Conference in December 2007, the Congress of South African Trade Unions endorsed Love for election to the National Executive Committee (NEC) of the ANC. She was elected to a five-year term on the NEC; by number of votes received, she was ranked 45th of the 80 candidates elected.

== Human Rights Commission: 2009–2016 ==
In October 2009, Parliament recommended Love's appointment as a part-time commissioner to the South African Human Rights Commission (SAHRC), a position which she ultimately held for a seven-year term ending in 2016. In 2010, she established a special SAHRC committee on water pollution and human rights. Because her appointment was part-time, she also remained national director at the LRC.

However, she resigned from the ANC NEC in order to take up the SAHRC post. This caused controversy when, in September 2010, ANC Secretary-General Gwede Mantashe said that Love was among the NEC members who had resigned to take up "deployment to strategic state departments and institutions". Although the opposition Democratic Alliance had supported Love's appointment, the party's leader, Helen Zille, argued that Mantashe's framing should "set alarm bells ringing for anybody who treasures the independence" of the SAHRC and other Chapter Nine institutions. Zille's sustained criticism ignited a broader debate about the ANC's policy of cadre deployment. In 2010, a number of prominent figures in civil society and law – including Geoff Budlender, Zackie Achmat, Paul Verryn, Pierre de Vos, Richard Calland, and Judith February of the Institute for Democratic Alternatives – signed an open letter which defended Love. The letter read in part:

We are surprised and dismayed by Premier Helen Zille’s implication that [Love] will not act independently of narrow party politics in her capacity as a human rights commissioner. Under the leadership of Janet Love, the LRC has fought fearlessly for the rights of the poor and powerless, without favour to the ANC or any other political party.

In the same year, asked whether she was still a member of the ANC, Love replied, "That's my own business," but said that she was not a member of the party's offices or decision-making structures. By late 2014, she said that she no longer had "any direct involvement" in any political party, beyond voting.

== Electoral Commission: 2016–present ==
In March 2016, following an interview process, the National Assembly recommended that Love should be appointed as a commissioner at the Electoral Commission of South Africa (IEC), filling the vacancy left by Raenette Taljaard's resignation. Her candidacy was supported by all three of the largest political parties – the ANC, the Democratic Alliance, and the Economic Freedom Fighters – and her appointment was confirmed unanimously by the house. She joined the IEC as a part-time commissioner in April 2016 and was appointed to a full-time position as vice-chairperson of the IEC in November 2018. She remained the national director of the LRC until mid-2018, when she was replaced by Nersan Govender.
