= Geoff Budlender =

South African lawyer

Geoff Budlender SC
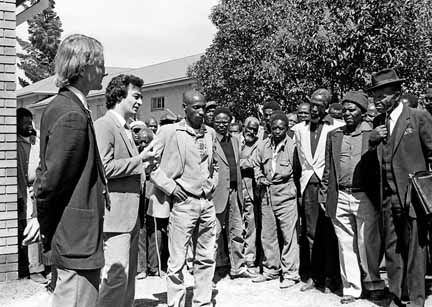
- Geoff Budlender, explains the court procedure to Driefontein residents outside the Volksrust court in 1984.
- Born: Geoffrey Budlender; 18 May 1949 (age 77); Port Elizabeth, Cape Province; South Africa
- Education: Grey High School; University of Cape Town
- Occupations: Advocate; attorney
- Organization: Legal Resources Centre
- Spouse: Aninka Claassens
- Children: 4, including Steven Budlender

Geoffrey Budlender SC (born 18 May 1949) is a South African lawyer known for his involvement in public interest litigation. He co-founded the Legal Resources Centre, where he worked as an attorney until he was admitted as an advocate in 2005. He is currently a part-time member of the Competition Commission's Competition Tribunal.

While a student at the University of Cape Town, Budlender became involved in anti-apartheid activism through the National Union of South African Students. With Arthur Chaskalson and Felicia Kentridge, he co-founded the Legal Resources Centre in 1979 and became reputed as a progressive human rights lawyer. He worked as an attorney at the Centre continuously until 2004, with the exception of a stint as director-general of the Department of Land Affairs between 1996 and 2000. He joined the Cape Bar in January 2005 and gained silk status in 2009. His main practice area is public law, including human rights law, administrative law, and constitutional law.

== Early life and education ==
Budlender was born on 18 May 1949 in Port Elizabeth. He grew up in a middle-class family in the suburb of Mill Park and matriculated at Grey High School.

In 1968, he entered the University of Cape Town as a medical student. Later that year, he became involved in student activism as one of the students who lodged a sit-in during the Mafeje affair. He joined the National Union of South African Students, which at the time was strongly opposed to apartheid, and was elected as the president of the university's student representative council in 1971. In 1972, he transferred from his medical degree to study law, and he graduated with a BA LLB in 1975. Budlender's student activism attracted the attention of the apartheid government, and Prime Minister John Vorster was said (possibly apocryphally) to have described him as "the second most dangerous man in South Africa".

== Early legal career ==
After completing his degree, Budlender served his articles at a Johannesburg law firm that specialised in defending political activists; among other cases, he worked on the defence of anti-apartheid activist Tokyo Sexwale against charges brought under the Terrorism Act.

In 1979, he, Arthur Chaskalson, and Felicia Kentridge co-founded the Legal Resources Centre, supported initially by external donors such as the Ford Foundation and the Carnegie Corporation. The Centre pursued public interest litigation and strategic litigation on a pro bono basis and mounted several prominent challenges to the apartheid state. After the end of apartheid, research by the Truth and Reconciliation Commission and testimony by state operative Paul Erasmus revealed that Budlender had been a target of so-called Stratcom "dirty tricks" operations against members of the anti-apartheid white left.

== Post-apartheid legal career ==
After South Africa's first democratic elections, Arthur Chaskalson was appointed to the new Constitutional Court of South Africa, and Budlender replaced him as national director of the Legal Resources Centre between 1994 and 1996. During that period, in 1995, the Centre represented the appellants in the matter of S v Makwanyane, in which the Constitutional Court handed down its landmark ruling that capital punishment was inconsistent with the interim Constitution; Budlender was an instructing attorney on the case under Advocate Wim Trengove.

In 1996, President Nelson Mandela appointed Budlender as director-general in the national Department of Land Affairs, which was then under the political leadership of Minister Derek Hanekom. After the June 1999 general election, newly appointed Minister Thoko Didiza announced that Budlender would be replaced as director-general; the Mail & Guardian said that he would "leave a gap that will be difficult to fill", and Helena Dolny of the Land Bank publicly suggested that his departure was part of an "ethnic cleansing" of the department's "white left".

In 2000, he returned to the Legal Resources Centre as head of its constitutional litigation unit, a position he held until 2004. In that capacity, he was an attorney for the respondents in Government v Grootboom in 2000. In subsequent years, he represented the Treatment Action Campaign in its campaign to reverse the AIDS-denialist health policies of President Thabo Mbeki's government; in Minister of Health v Treatment Action Campaign, handed down in the Constitutional Court in 2002, they secured an order compelling the government to provide nevirapine to all HIV-positive pregnant women. Budlender also represented the Treatment Action Campaign in its bid to interdict Matthias Rath from distributing multivitamins as a quack treatment for AIDS.

=== Admission to the bar ===
Having until then practiced as an attorney, Budlender was admitted to the Cape Bar as an advocate on 18 January 2005; he was granted silk status in 2009. As an advocate, he argued a number of further politically sensitive cases, including several in the Constitutional Court. Among other clients, he represented mineworkers affected by lung disease in a massive class action suit against 32 mining companies; pensioner Elizabeth Gumede in a challenge to the constitutionality of the Recognition of Customary Marriages Act; Black Sash in its campaign to hold Minister Bathabile Dlamini accountable for the 2017 social grants crisis; and activist Andrew Feinstein during the Seriti Commission of Inquiry into the Arms Deal.

In addition, in 2012, retired judge Ian Farlam recruited Budlender to serve as one of five evidence leaders at his commission of inquiry into the Marikana massacre. He served as head evidence leader throughout the commission's two-year tenure, though he said in his closing arguments that he had found the dishonesty of the commission's witnesses to be "dispiriting".

=== State capture ===
In 2017, Tokyo Sexwale, in his capacity as non-executive chairperson of Trillian Capital Partners, commissioned Budlender to conduct an independent investigation into the veracity of allegations that Trillian had links to the Gupta family and to state capture. Budlender reported that many of the allegations were credible, and Sexwale resigned after tabling it. Budlender's report also implicated McKinsey & Company in questionable dealings with Trillian, and McKinsey, accused of failing to cooperate with Budlender's investigation, later apologised publicly to him. Over the next year, Budlender was commissioned to carry out similar investigations at two public entities – the Public Investment Corporation and the Industrial Development Corporation – that were also suspected of involvement in state capture.

In October 2019, the Department of Justice further announced that it would retain the assistance of Budlender and three other senior advocates – Wim Trengove‚ Ngwako Maenetje, and Tembeka Ngcukaitobi – in guiding state capture-related investigations and prosecutions. R5 million was made available for the legal fees of each advocate. Subsequent to that announcement, Budlender appeared for the National Prosecuting Authority on several occasions, most recently in opposing former president Jacob Zuma's bid to have Billy Downer removed as the state prosecutor assigned to his corruption trial. He also served as counsel for President Cyril Ramaphosa in 2022 when Busisiwe Mkhwebane challenged her suspension from the office of Public Protector.

== Candidacy for judicial appointment ==
Budlender acted as a judge of the High Court of South Africa for the first time in 2001, serving in the Witwatersrand Local Division between May and June. After that, he acted in the Cape High Court for several non-consecutive terms. On three separate occasions, the Judicial Service Commission shortlisted and interviewed him for permanent appointment to the Cape bench; the third and final occasion was in late 2004, following a contentious interview in October.

In September 2009, he was one of nine shortlisted candidates interviewed for appointment to vacancies on the Constitutional Court, and, during his interview, he suggested that he had been passed over for judicial appointment in the past because of his involvement in litigation which Thabo Mbeki's administration considered hostile, especially his work with the Treatment Action Campaign. The Judicial Service Commission did not recommend him for appointment to the Constitutional Court.

The Judicial Service Commission's omission to appoint Budlender as a judge has remained a controversial issue, is frequently described as "inexplicable", and is frequently mentioned as an example of the commission's overzealous application of affirmative action. As early as 2004, legal journalist Carmel Rickard caused a stir by suggesting that Budlender's non-appointment demonstrated that the bench was effectively "closed" to white men. She wrote in the Sunday Times:

There is no white in South Africa who can match his credentials. If Budlender is unacceptable to the commission, no other white male lawyer can make it. It's time for the Judicial Service Commission to be frank with the legal profession and say that white male lawyers should no longer apply for positions on the Bench.

In 2013, commissioner Izak Smuts resigned from the Judicial Service Commission, citing the commission's failure to exploit the "wasted forensic talent" of Budlender, Clive Plasket, and Jeremy Gauntlett.

== Public service ==
Budlender joined the council of his alma mater, the University of Cape Town, in 2002; he served as its chairperson between July 2004 and July 2008. In January 2023, he was appointed as a part-time member of the Competition Commission's Competition Tribunal.

== Honours ==
In October 2021, the International Bar Association awarded Budlender its Pro Bono Award for his pro bono work at the Legal Resources Centre and elsewhere.

== Personal life ==
He is Jewish and lives in Claremont, Cape Town. His wife, Aninka Claassens, is a sociologist at the University of Cape Town; they met during apartheid in Driefontein, where Budlender was representing a community against forced removal and Claassens was working for Black Sash. They have four children and several grandchildren. His son Steven Budlender is also an advocate; the pair appeared together in the Constitutional Court in 2022, arguing on behalf of the defendants in Mineral Sands Resources v Reddell.
