= Nigel Willis =

South African judge (born 1953)

Judge of the Supreme Court of Appeal
- In office 1 July 2013 – 1 October 2018
- Appointed by: Jacob Zuma

Judge of the High Court
- In office 10 November 1998 – 30 June 2013
- Appointed by: Nelson Mandela
- Division: Gauteng

Personal details
- Born: Nigel Paul Willis; 5 June 1953 (age 72) Cape Town, Cape Province; Union of South Africa
- Spouse: Glenda Daniels
- Education: Hilton College
- Alma mater: University of Cape Town; University of South Africa; St Augustine College; Ruprecht-Karls-Universität

Nigel Paul Willis (born 5 June 1953) is a South African retired judge who served in the Supreme Court of Appeal from July 2013 until his retirement in October 2018. Before that, between November 1998 and June 2013, he served in the Gauteng High Court, where he gained a reputation for conservative and pro-capitalist jurisprudence. He was also a judge of the Labour Appeal Court.

Born in Cape Town, Willis began his career in banking but practised as an advocate between 1980 and 1998, taking silk in 1997.

== Early life and education ==
Willis was born on 5 June 1953 in Cape Town. However, he attended school in Natal Province, matriculating in 1970 at Hilton College. He went on to the University of Cape Town, where he completed a Bachelor of Business Science in 1975. Several years later, in 1979, he completed an LLB at the University of South Africa.

While sitting as a judge, Willis returned to university to study theology. He completed an MPhil at St Augustine College in Johannesburg in 2008 and a DPhil at Ruprecht-Karls-Universität in Heidelberg, Germany in 2012. His doctoral dissertation, on pentecostalism, was entitled The Work of the Spirit: the Contribution by American Contemporary Scholars of Pentecostalism to an Understanding of the Worldwide Pentecostal Movement.

== Legal career ==
After his undergraduate graduation, Willis worked at Barclays Bank between 1976 and 1980. However, after completing his LLB, he left banking for legal practice, gaining admission as an advocate of the Supreme Court of South Africa in 1980. He was initially admitted to the Cape Bar, but he left in 1983 to work in Gaborone, Botswana, where he was head of litigation at the firm of Damant Bostock & Magang Attorneys. In 1984, he returned to South Africa and joined the Johannesburg Bar, where he practiced for the next 14 years.

During his time in practice, Willis was appointed as a commissioner of the Small Claims Court in 1989, as a member of the Transkei Industrial Court in 1991, as a presiding officer in the Independent Electoral Commission's Electoral Tribunal in 1994, and as a commissioner in the Commission for Conciliation, Mediation and Arbitration in 1996. He took silk in 1997.

== Gauteng High Court: 1998–2013 ==
In 1998, Willis joined the bench permanently as a judge of the Transvaal Provincial Division of the High Court of South Africa (later the Gauteng High Court). The following year, he was additionally appointed as a judge of the Labour Appeal Court. One of Willis's most controversial judgements, a minority judgement in Woolworths v Whitehead, was written in the Labour Appeal Court in 2000; in it, Willis argued that the right of pregnant women to equal treatment could be overridden in cases where pregnancy discrimination was profitable.

In general, Willis was viewed as a conservative judge and even as a "'maverick' pro-capitalist", with Richard Calland describing him as "seeing the Constitution through the lens of private property". Because of his preference for laissez-faire capitalism, his judicial philosophy was sometimes called "fundamentally at odds" with or (by Pierre de Vos) "completely out of kilter with" the values of the South African Constitution, and particularly with established jurisprudence on socioeconomic rights such as the right to housing. In Machele v Mailula, the Constitutional Court criticised Willis for authorising an eviction without considering the Prevention of Illegal Eviction Act, a decision which the Constitutional Court called "inexcusable", though Willis defended against that charge in a separate and subsequent eviction judgement, Emfuleni Local Municipality v Builders Advancement Services.

Willis was twice nominated unsuccessfully for possible elevation to the Constitutional Court. He was first nominated in 2008, though the Judicial Service Commission declined to recommend any appointment on that occasion; the Mail & Guardian reported that Willis had divided the commission panel, with some members viewing him as highly unsuitable for elevation. He was interviewed again the following year, and during that interview, he expressed his view that the Constitutional Court sometimes "missed the point" and made "orders that are not practically implementable", such as the order in Government v Grootboom.

== Supreme Court of Appeal: 2013–2018 ==
In April 2013, the Judicial Service Commission recommended that Willis and Halima Saldulker should be appointed to two vacancies at the Supreme Court of Appeal. Because Willis's interview had been short and "convivial", while opposing contender Clive Plasket was subjected to rigorous questioning, the announcement attracted a significant amount of public debate. However, President Jacob Zuma accepted the recommendation and confirmed Willis's appointment with effect from 1 July 2013. He served in the appellate court until his retirement in 2018.

== Personal life ==
He is married to Glenda Daniels, an academic and former journalist, and has three children. He formerly served on the boards of several private game reserves in Botswana.
