= Ahmed Timol =

South African anti-apartheid activist (1941–1971)

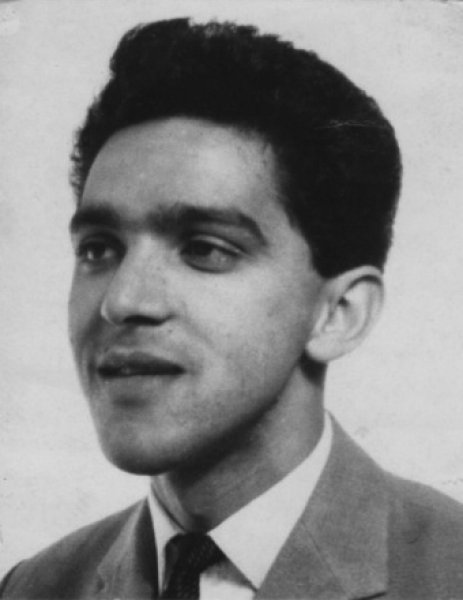
- Born: 3 November 1941; Breyten, Transvaal, Union of South Africa
- Died: 27 October 1971 (aged 29); John Vorster Square, Johannesburg, South Africa
- Occupation: Teacher
- Known for: Anti-apartheid activism
- Honours: Order of Luthuli (silver)

Ahmed Timol (3 November 1941 – 27 October 1971) was an anti-apartheid activist in the underground South African Communist Party. He died at the age of 29 from injuries sustained when he fell from the top floor of John Vorster Square police station in Johannesburg. Police claimed, and an official inquest confirmed, that Timol had committed suicide by jumping out the window. The claim was widely disbelieved in anti-apartheid circles, and in the movement Timol's death became symbolic of the broader phenomenon of deaths in police custody, as well as of the abuses and dishonesty of the apartheid state.

In 2017, the inquest into Timol's death was reopened. It found that Timol had been tortured in custody and had fallen from the window because he was pushed by police officers, not because he jumped.

== Biography ==
Timol was born in 1941 in Breyten, Transvaal (now part of Mpumalanga), into a large Muslim family of Gujarati descent. Timol was one of six children, with two sisters, Zubeida and Aysha, and three brothers, Ismail, Mohammed and Haroon. His father, a shopkeeper, came to South Africa in 1918, at the age of 12, from the Kholvad district of Surat in western India. Timol joined a semi-clandestine Roodepoort Youth Study Group while still a student at Johannesburg Indian High School, and became friends at school with the brothers Aziz Pahad and Essop Pahad, both of whom would become prominent anti-apartheid activists.

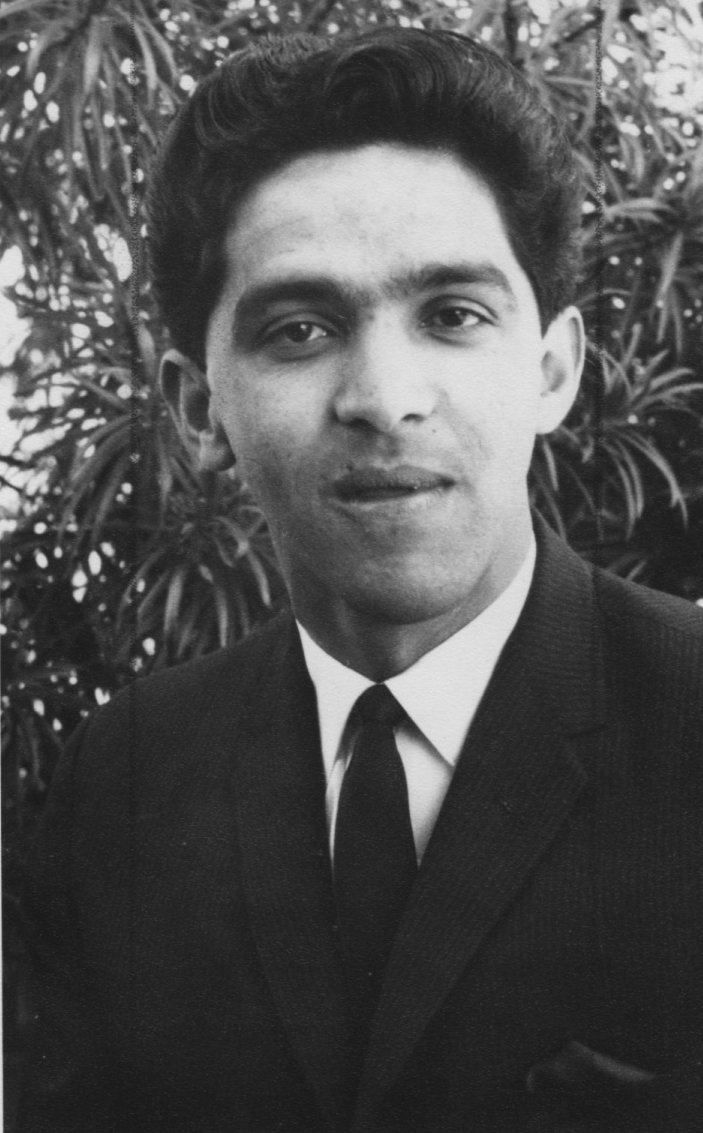
Timol as a young adult

After working as a clerk for some years, Timol received a scholarship from the Kholvad Madressa in Surat to pursue a teaching course at the Johannesburg Training Institute for Indian Teachers, the only institution of higher education for Indians in the Transvaal at the time. He was Vice-Chairman of the Student Representative Council from 1962 to 1963, and the SRC became an affiliate of the National Union of South African Students in 1963.

After teaching for some time at a school in Roodepoort, in 1966 Timol left South Africa for Mecca for the Hajj. In Saudi Arabia, he met and was inspired by Yusuf Dadoo, leader of the Transvaal Indian Congress and later the Chairman of the South African Communist Party (SACP), and Moulvi Cachalia, an African National Congress (ANC) stalwart. In April 1967, Timol went to London, where he lived with the Pahads. He took up a teaching post at the Immigration School at Slough, which provided him with funds, became an active member of the National Union of Teachers and met Ruth Longoni, who worked for the Labour Monthly, a journal run by Rajani Palme Dutt of the Communist Party of Great Britain. The two came close to marrying, but Timol left for Moscow in the Soviet Union in 1969, as he had been selected to study at the International Lenin School. He was trained in Marxist-Leninist ideology, along with three fellow South Africans, one of them Thabo Mbeki, then a communist, later South African state president. After completing his training, Timol returned to London and received additional training for four weeks from Jack Hodgson, an SACP member in exile.

In February 1970, Timol returned to Roodepoort and resumed teaching. He was active in the SACP and in Umkhonto we Sizwe (MK), the paramilitary wing of the ANC, though both had been banned in 1960. His political work included recruitment for the ANC, MK and SACP, producing and distributing pamphlets, and procuring equipment for underground structures.

== Death ==
In October 1971, aged 29, Timol was arrested at a roadblock. According to the police, officers found banned ANC and SACP literature, as well as copies of secret communication correspondence, in the boot of the car he was travelling in. He was detained under the Terrorism Act of 1967 with Amina Desai and two others, all of whom later said that they had been severely tortured in custody. He died on 27 October, five days after his arrest, from injuries sustained when he fell from the tenth floor of John Vorster Square police station in Johannesburg. He was the first political detainee to die in Security Branch custody at John Vorster Square. The police claimed that he had jumped from a window, which his family disputed in the press. His death sparked nationwide shock, anger and demands for an inquiry. Support for such an inquiry came from a broad spectrum of the South African population that included the United Party (UP), various churches, the black South African Students Association, the Coloured Labour Party, and the Indian Congresses. In Durban, a packed meeting attended by people of all races called for a national day of mourning, which was observed on 10 November 1971.

An official inquest in 1972 ruled that his death had been a suicide. The presiding magistrate suggested that Timol had killed himself after disclosing sensitive information during interrogation, because he feared imprisonment, and because the SACP had instructed its members to kill themselves before betraying the party.

Timol's family and others testified about his death at the Truth and Reconciliation Commission (TRC), and the TRC ultimately assigned responsibility for Timol's death to several policemen. It also found that "the inquest magistrate's failure to hold the police responsible for Ahmed Timol's death contributed to a culture of impunity that led to further gross human rights violations."

He was himself the light in a darkening room... The apartheid regime had banned us a decade earlier and had brutally set out to break and torture our scattered comrades. They believed that they had broken the back of the underground. And then they found Ahmed. Mayibuye! ["May it return!"] They performed upon his body a macabre dance, a danse macabre of exorcism through violence. It was their own neurosis that spoke through every blow, because in him our revolutionary spirit was made flesh and they simply could not believe it. He was and remained, even after his death, the spectre that was haunting South Africa.

— Thabo Mbeki on Timol

=== 2017 inquest ===
The inquest was reopened in 2017 at the request of Timol's family. George Bizos was part of the team representing Timol's family, as he had been in the original 1972 inquest. In October 2017, the second inquest found that Timol had been pushed out the window or off the roof by members of the Security Branch. The inquest also heard evidence that Timol had been tortured during his detention, including from Salim Essop, who had been detained and tortured alongside Timol but whose testimony had been excluded from the original inquest. The presiding Judge said that the officers holding Timol in custody were collectively responsible for his death, and that there was a prima facie case of murder under dolus eventualis against the two officers who had interrogated Timol that day, both of whom had died years earlier. One surviving officer, Joao Rodrigues, died in September 2021 while facing a murder charge for Timol's death.

=== Legacy ===
On 29 March 1999, President Nelson Mandela attended a ceremony at which Azaadville Second School in Krugersdorp was renamed after Timol. President Jacob Zuma posthumously awarded him the Order of Luthuli (Silver) in 2009,"for his excellent contribution and selfless sacrifice in the struggle against apartheid."

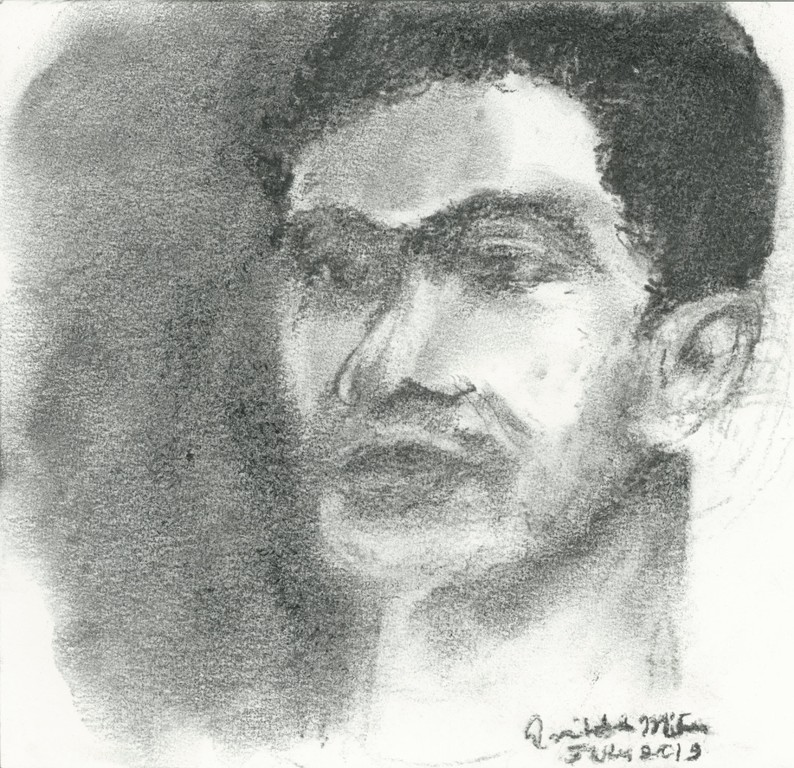
Charcoal portrait of Ahmed Timol by Dr Amitabh Mitra

== In the media ==
The Chris Van Wyk poem "In Detention" (1979) is a satire of the explanations given to cover up Timol's Death Indians Can't Fly (2015), directed by Enver Samuel and edited by Nikki Comninos, is a documentary about Timol. The follow-up Someone to Blame – The Ahmed Timol Inquest (2018), also directed by Samuel, focuses on the reopening of the inquest.
