= Walter Thomas Wragg =

English judge (1842–1913)

Walter Thomas Wragg (1842 – 1913) was an English puisne judge of the Supreme Court of Natal.

Wragg was born in Sheffield, the son of a cutler. He was educated at Sheffield Grammar School, Sheffield Collegiate School and the University of Oxford. After briefly teaching, he joined the Ceylon Civil Service in 1868. From 1872 to 1883, he was a District Judge. In 1879, he was called to the bar from the Inner Temple.

Wragg was appointed puisne judge of the supreme court of Natal in 1883. From 1885 to 1887, he was president of a Commission on Indian immigration laws in Natal. He also headed a special Judicial Commission constructed to try Zulus who attempted to keep up resistance after Cetshwayo's death in 1884. He was knighted by letters patent in 1891. He retired from the bench in 1898, and died in June 1913.
