= Kholvad House =

Landmark in South Africa

- Interactive map of the Kholvad House area

General information
- Status: Completed
- Type: Apartment Building
- Location: 27 Albertina Sisulu Rd (Market Street), Johannesburg, South Africa
- Coordinates: 26.20537°S 28.03481°E
- Completed: 1942

Design and construction
- Architect: Rusty Bernstein

Website
- http://www.kholvad.org.za

Kholvad House, which includes Flat 13, is a Johannesburg, South Africa building and landmark known for its role in the South African struggle for civil rights. Its Flat 13 was the home of Robben Island prisoner Ahmed Kathrada for more than 16 years, including 1952 when he planned the Defiance Campaign, and Nelson Mandela used the home to see clients in 1960 when his law firm was shut down.

== History ==
Nelson Mandela described the building as a place where "the first seeds of non-racialism were sown and a wider concept of the nation came into being". The block of flats was designed by Lionel 'Rusty' Bernstein, a Communist Party leader and Hilton College old boy In 1942, the flats were constructed by a group of Indians from the peasant community of Kholvad. The buildings would also be used to raise funds to educate poor children in Kholvad and in South Africa. Dr. Yusuf Dadoo was one of the early Chairpersons of the Board of Trustees.

Flat 13 in Kholvad house earned a reputation for its ongoing contribution to the struggle. The flat acted as the headquarters for freedom fighters. When Ahmed Kathrada took over Flat 13 it remained a hive of political activity. After Oliver Tambo left for exile in 1960, Mandela moved his legal practice to flat 13. In his book Long Walk to Freedom, Mandela wrote:

"At Wits I met and became friends with Ismail Meer, J. N. Singh, Ahmed Bhoola and Ramlal Bhoolia. The centre of this tight-knit community was Ismail's apartment, Flat 13, Kholvad House. ... There we studied, talked ... and it became a kind of headquarters for young freedom fighters. I sometimes slept here." (Long Walk to Freedom, p. 105)

Flat 13 is also the name of a documentary about Ahmed Kathrada. The film recounts the hopes and tales of anti-apartheid activists, that used this flat as a sanctuary Kholvad House is another historical landmark in South Africa's liberation struggle.
