= Masipa =

Masipa is a surname. Notable people with the surname include:

- Mokgere Masipa (born 1974), South African judge
- Noko Masipa (born 1968), South African politician
- Thokozile Masipa (born 1947), South African judge
