= S v Cooper =

S v Cooper (1976), an important case in South African criminal procedure, dealt with endangering the maintenance of law and order in terms of the Terrorism Act, 1967.

The court held that an accused is not entitled to be informed of every detail of the case against him and the prosecution should not be tied down with further particulars in a way which would limit its case unfairly at the trial.

Thus where there are particulars unknown to the prosecutor, it is sufficient to state that fact.

The use of particulars is intended to meet a requirement imposed in fairness and justice to both the accused and the prosecution.
