= Legal Resources Centre =

Human rights organisation based in South Africa

The Legal Resources Centre (LRC) is a human rights organisation based in South Africa with offices in Johannesburg (including a Constitutional Litigation Unit), Cape Town, Durban and Makhanda. It was founded in 1979 by a group of prominent South African lawyers, including Arthur Chaskalson, Felicia Kentridge, and Geoff Budlender, under the guidance of American civil rights lawyers Jack Greenberg and Michael Meltsner, then Director-Counsel and former First Assistant Counsel of the NAACP Legal Defense and Educational Fund respectively.

The LRC is a generalist public interest law firm that engages in litigation and other activities across a wide range of focus areas, including the full range of rights in the Constitution of South Africa. The LRC has litigated many of South Africa's landmark human rights cases since its establishment, including major cases resisting apartheid injustices and cases under the new Constitution after 1994. These include S v Makwanyane (abolishing the death penalty), Government of the Republic of South Africa v Grootboom (establishing the justiciability of socio-economic rights), the Treatment Action Campaign case (compelling government to provide anti-retroviral drugs to prevent transmission of HIV at childbirth) and the silicosis class action (South Africa's largest class action, against the major players in the gold mining industry, culminating in a multi-billion Rand settlement to compensate black mineworkers).

The LRC has produced more judges than any other law firm or public interest law centre, all appointed after 1994. They include the first head of the newly created Constitutional Court, Arthur Chaskalson, and the former President of the Supreme Court of Appeal, Lex Mpati, as well as many others.

== Notable alumni ==
- George Bizos, human rights advocate
- Jason Brickhill, human rights advocate and academic
- Geoff Budlender, human rights advocate and attorney
- Arthur Chaskalson, Chief Justice and Constitutional Court judge
- Mahendra Chetty, judge of the KwaZulu-Natal Division of the High Court
- Alan Dodson, advocate
- John Hlophe, Judge President of the Western Cape Division of the High Court
- Fayeeza Kathree-Setiloane, judge of the Supreme Court of Appeal
- Felicia Kentridge, human rights advocate and wife of leading anti-apartheid lawyer Sydney Kentridge
- Sisi Khampepe, Constitutional Court judge
- Janet Love, member of the South African Human Rights Commission and Independent Electoral Commission
- Bongani Christopher Majola, former Assistant Secretary-General of the United Nations International Criminal Tribunal for Rwanda
- Shehnaz Meer, judge of the Western Cape Division of the High Court
- Dunstan Mlambo, Judge President of the Gauteng Division of the High Court
- Lex Mpati, former President of the Supreme Court of Appeal
- Mahomed Navsa, judge of the Supreme Court of Appeal
- Sandile Ngcobo, Chief Justice and Constitutional Court judge
- Chris Nicholson, judge in the KwaZulu-Natal Division of the High Court
- Tembeka Ngcukaitobi, human rights advocate and author
- Clive Plasket, judge of the Supreme Court of Appeal
- Thandi Orleyn, corporate executive, former head of Commission for Conciliation, Mediation & Arbitration (CCMA)
