= I. C. Meer =

South African activist (1918–2000)

I. C. Meer OLS

Member of the KwaZulu-Natal Legislature
- In office May 1994 – 1 May 2000

Personal details
- Born: Ismail Chota Meer; 5 September 1918 Wasbank, Natal Province; Union of South Africa
- Died: 1 May 2000 (aged 81) Durban, KwaZulu-Natal; Republic of South Africa
- Party: African National Congress
- Other political affiliations: South African Indian Congress; Communist Party of South Africa
- Spouse: Fatima Meer (m. 1951)
- Children: 3, including Shehnaz Meer
- Education: University of Natal; University of the Witwatersrand

Ismail Chota Meer OLS (5 September 1918 – 1 May 2000), sometimes spelled Ismael Meer, was a South African lawyer, writer, and anti-apartheid activist. He was the secretary of the Transvaal Indian Congress during the presidency of Yusuf Dadoo, and he later held leadership positions in the Natal Indian Congress and South African Indian Congress. After the end of apartheid, he represented the African National Congress in the KwaZulu-Natal Legislature from May 1994 until his death in May 2000.

== Early life and education ==
Meer was born on 5 September 1918 in Waschbank, a small town in northern Natal Province (now KwaZulu-Natal). His father, Chota Meer, had migrated from Surat, India to Natal in 1893, opening a general store called C. A. Meer in nearby Dundee. He was a teenager when his father's business collapsed during the Great Depression, and he moved to the urban centre of Durban to find work. He matriculated in 1939 at Sastri College in Berea, Durban.

After high school, Meer completed a BA degree at the University of Natal, where he was president of the student representative council. Thereafter he moved to Johannesburg to study law at the University of the Witwatersrand. He graduated in 1946 and went on to qualify as an attorney; for many years from 1951, he ran a legal practice in Verulam, Natal.

== Political activism ==
Having joined the Non-European United Front in high school, Meer became increasingly involved in politics as a university student. While at the University of Natal, he was particularly involved in trade union organising, becoming a co-founder and secretary of the Natal Teachers' Union while still a student. In Johannesburg, he was a member of the Communist Party of South Africa, the left-wing Liberal Study Group, and the Transvaal Indian Congress (TIC). His Johannesburg home, Flat 13 at Kholvad House in Market Street, became a meeting place for his politically active classmates; Nelson Mandela later described as "a kind of headquarters for young freedom fighters". In Flat 13 he also became a political mentor to Ahmed Kathrada, who said in his memoirs that Meer was, "more than an individual – he was an institution". His own political influences included Jawaharlal Nehru and Clements Kadalie.

In 1946, Meer was elected to take office as secretary of the TIC, serving under newly elected TIC president Yusuf Dadoo. Under Dadoo's leadership, the TIC launched its campaign of passive resistance to the Ghetto Act, as well as its gradual embrace of the African National Congress (ANC) and other non-Indian political organisations; Meer was regarded as an instrumental figure in both respects. He also contributed to various progressive publications – including through a regular column titled I Remember in the Leader newspaper – and he was editor of the Passive Resister, a Johannesburg-based publication that reported on developments in the two-year-long Ghetto Act campaign.

In the 1950s, while practising as a lawyer in Verulam, Meer remained politically active in the anti-apartheid movement. In 1952, he was on the executive committee of the Defiance Campaign, and on 29 November that year he led one of the campaign's civil disobedience events; he was arrested and imprisoned for a month with hard labour. He went on to serve stints as vice-president of the Natal Indian Congress and president of the Natal branch of the South African Congress of Trade Unions. He and his wife were both subjected to banning orders in 1954, and – after being arrested while recovering from an appendectomy – he was among the 156 activists charged with treason in the 1956 Treason Trial. Although he was acquitted of treason, he was detained again during the 1960 state of emergency. As a result of state banning orders, it was illegal to quote or print Meer's words between 1952 and 1990, though he continued to write under a pseudonym.

== Post-apartheid political career ==
The ANC was unbanned in 1990 during the negotiations to end apartheid, and Meer was elected as chairperson of the party's local branch in Durban West. He stood as an ANC candidate in the first post-apartheid elections in April 1994 and was elected to a seat in the KwaZulu-Natal Legislature. He retained his seat after the June 1999 general election. During this period, he also established the Liberation History Foundation, which promoted historical research and education about neglected aspects of the anti-apartheid struggle.

While still serving as a legislator, Meer died in his sleep on 1 May 2000 at his home in Clare Estate, Durban. In April 2011, President Jacob Zuma admitted him posthumously to the Order of Luthuli, granting him the award in silver for "His excellent contribution to a non-racial and democratic South Africa, struggle for liberation, workers rights and for the formation of the Natal Teachers' Union."

== Personal life ==
In March 1951, he married Fatima Meer, who was his father's grand-niece. Their son, Rashid, died in a car accident in 1995. They also had two daughters, Shamim and Shehnaz. Meer was Muslim; he frequently delivered the jumu'ah khutbah and taught tafsir at his mosque, and he performed hajj with his wife in 1984.

After Meer's death, his family edited and published his autobiography, A Fortunate Man, which was printed in 2002 with a foreword by Nelson Mandela.
