= Fatima Meer =

South African writer and activist (1928–2010)

- Born: 12 August 1928; Durban, Natal, South Africa
- Died: 12 March 2010 (aged 81); Durban, KwaZulu-Natal Province
- Resting place: Brook Street Cemetery, Durban
- Education: University of Natal
- Occupations: Writer and academic
- Notable work: Higher Than Hope
- Title: Professor
- Spouse: Ismail Chota Meer
- Children: 3, including Shehnaz

Fatima Meer (12 August 1928 – 12 March 2010) was a South African writer, academic, screenwriter, and prominent anti-apartheid activist.

== Early life ==
Fatima Meer was born in the Grey Streets of Durban, South Africa, into a middle-class family of nine, where her father M.I. Meer, a newspaper editor of TIV (The Indian View), instilled in her a consciousness of the racial discrimination that existed in the country. Her mother was Rachel Farrell, the second wife of Moosa Ismail Meer. Her mother was orphaned and of Jewish and Portuguese descent. She converted to Islam and changed her name to Amina. When she was 16 years old in 1944, she helped raise £1 000 for famine relief in Bengal, India.

She completed her schooling at the Durban Indian Girls High School. When she was still a student she mobilized students to found the Student Passive Resistance Committee to gather funds for the Indian community's passive resistance campaign from 1946 to 1948. The committee led her to meet Yusuf Dadoo, Monty Naicker, and Kesaveloo Goonam. She subsequently attended the University of the Witwatersrand for one year where she was a member of a Trotskyism group that was affiliated to Non-European Unity Movement (NEUM). She went to the University of Natal, where she completed a Bachelor's degree and Master's degree in Sociology.a

== Political activist ==
Meer and Kesaveloo Goonam became the first women to be elected as executive of the Natal Indian Congress (NIC) in 1950. She helped to establish the Durban and District Women's League on 4 October 1952 as a group of 70 women. This organisation was started in order to build alliances between Africans and Indians as a result of the race riots between the two groups in 1949. Bertha Mkhize became the chairperson and Meer became the secretary of the league. The league undertook work such as organizing child care and distributing milk at Cato Manor. The League also gathered funds for victims of a tornado at Springs where Africans became homeless, and successfully collected £4000 for the Sea Cow Lake flood victims.

After the National Party gained power in 1948 and started implementing their policy of apartheid, Meer's activism increased and as a result of her activism, she was first "banned" in 1952 for three years. She was one of the founding members of the Federation of South African Women (FEDSAW), established on 17 April 1954 in the Trades Hall on Rissik Street, in central Johannesburg, which spearheaded the historical women's march at the Union Buildings, Pretoria, on 9 August 1956. She was one of the leaders of the Women's March in 1956. At the same year, she organized a committee to gather funds for bail and support the families of Natal political leaders who were in the treason trial.

In the 1960s, Meer organised night vigils to protest against the mass detention of anti-apartheid activists without trial outside Durban prison. She was also one of the organisers of a week-long vigil at the Gandhi Settlement in Phoenix. The leader of the vigil was Sushila Gandhi. During the 1970s, Meer started to embrace Black Consciousness Ideology with South African Student Organisation (SASO) led by Steve Biko.

In 1975, Meer co-founded the Black Women's Federation (BWF) with Winnie Mandela. Meer became the first president of the organisation. A year later, she was banned again for a period of five years. The banning order came after she attended a meeting of the Black Studies Programme where she was a key speaker with a speech entitled "Twenty-Five Years of Apartheid Rule". In June 1976, after Soweto Uprisings, 11 women from BWF were arrested and detained under Section 6 of the Terrorism Act. They were placed in solitary confinement at Fort Prison on Johannesburg. She narrowly survived an assassination attempt shortly after her release from detention in 1976 when she was shot at her family home in Durban, but not harmed. Her son, Rashid, went into exile in the same year. She was attacked again and blamed the second attack on the Black Consciousness Movement and Inkatha Freedom Party.

During the 1980s, Meer founded Co-ordinating Committee of Black (Indian, Coloured, African) Ratepayers Organisations to oppose the injustices which were happening to the black townships caused by Durban municipality. She declined the offer of a seat in parliament in 1994, because of her preference for non-governmental work. In May 1999, Meer founded the Concerned Citizens' Group (CCG) to persuade Indian people not to vote for white parties in the next election.

She was a strong supporter of the Iranian Revolution and boycotted Salman Rushdie's trip to South Africa in 1998, claiming that he was a blasphemer. She was involved in protests against the oppression and assault of the Palestinian people and the US-led invasion of Afghanistan. She founded Jubilee 2000 to campaign for the cancellation of Third World debt.

== Charity work ==
She published her book entitled Portrait of Indian South Africans in 1969 and donated all revenue from the sale of the book to the Gandhi Settlement for the needs to build Gandhi Museum and Clinic. She helped an operation to rescue 10 000 Indian flood victims at Tin Town which was located on the banks of the Umgeni River. Meer built temporary housing in a tent and organized relief food and clothing. Later, she successfully negotiated permanent settlement for them in Phoenix. Meer also founded and became a leader of Natal Education Trust which gather money from the Indian community to build schools in Umlazi, Port Shepstone and Inanda.

She founded Tembalishe Tutorial College at Gandhi's Phoenix home to taught blacks in secretarial skills in 1979. Crafts Centre also established at the Settlement to taught screen printing, sewing, embroidery and knitting for unemployed, Both the college and the crafts Center were closed in 1982 following after Fatima detainment for breaching her banning order caused of supervising the work outside of Durban boundary. During the 1980s, she organised scholarships for ten students to go to United States and assisted the "SAVE OUR HOMES COMMITTEE" which was founded by the Coloured community of Sparks Estate to seek justice for who were threatened by the Durban Municipality whom wanted to take their homes. They succeeded gain the compensation for the act. Through the cooperation with Indira Gandhi, she organized scholarship for South African students to study medicine and the political sciences in India. IBR does tutorial programmes to improve the low matric pass rate and Phambili High was founded in 1986 for African students.

In 1992,(2 years before the first democratic election) Fatima Meer founded the Clare Estate Environment Group as a response to the needs of shack dwellers and rural migrants. They have no right in urban areas and need clean water, sanitation and proper settlement. Khanyisa School Project was founded in 1993 as a preparatory school for underprivileged African children before they go to formal school. She was also founded Khanya Women's Skills Training Centre in 1996, which teach 150 Black women in pattern-cutting, sewing, adult literacy and business management.

== Personal life ==
Fatima Meer married her first cousin in 1950, Ismail Meer. This was not uncommon in the Sunni Bhora community where she grew up. Ismail Meer was a prominent lawyer and anti-apartheid activist. He was an active member of the KwaZulu-Natal ANC provincial legislature. In the 1960s he was arrested and charged with treason, along with Nelson Mandela, and other activists. In 1995, Fatima Meer's son Rashid died in a car accident. She is survived by two daughters Shehnaz, a Land Claims Court judge, and Shamim, a social science consultant.

== Academic and writer ==
Meer became a lecturer of sociology and a staff member of the University of Natal from 1956 to 1988. She was the first non-white person to hold that position. She was also a visiting professor at a number of universities in abroad. Meer became a fellow of the London School of Economics, and received three honorary doctorates. First, she received an Honorary Doctorate in Philosophy from Swarthmore College (1984) and in Humane Letters from Bennet College in the United States (1994). Later, she received Honorary Doctorate in Social Sciences from Natal University in South Africa (1998).

She founded the Institute for Black Research (IBR), which became a research and publishing institution and educational NGO in 1972.

== Works ==
=== Books ===
- Portrait of Indian South Africans (1969)
- The Apprenticeship of a Mahatma (1970)
- Race and Suicide in South Africa (1976)
- Towards Understanding Iran Today (1985)
- Resistance in the Townships (1989)
- Higher than Hope (1990) (the first authorized biography of Nelson Mandela, which was translated into 13 languages)
- The South African Gandhi: The Speeches and Writings of M.K. Gandhi (1996)
- Passive Resistance, 1946: A Selection of Documents (1996)
- Fatima Meer: Memories of Love and Struggle (2017)

=== Television ===
- Screenwriter, The Making of the Mahatma, a Shyam Benegal film which was based on her book The Apprenticeship of a Mahatma; the film was co-produced by India and South Africa.

== Honours, decorations, awards and distinctions ==
- Union of South African Journalists Award (1975)
- Imal Abdullah Haroon Award for the Struggle against Oppression and Racial Discrimination (1990)
- Vishwa Gurjari Award for Contribution to Human Rights (1994)
- Top 100 Women Who Shook South Africa list (1999)
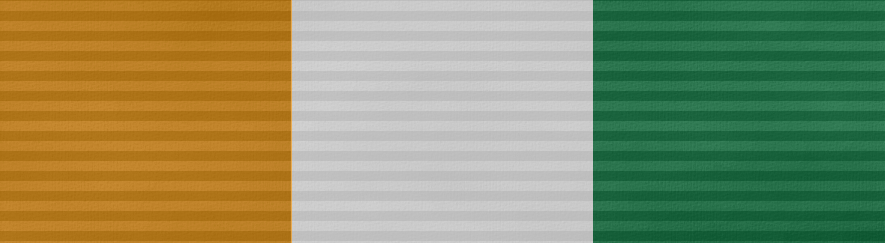
- Pravasi Bharatiya Samman (2003)
- #45 Top 100 Great South Africans (2004)
- South African National Order: Order for Meritorious Service in silver (2009)
- The Order of Luthuli in Silver (2017)

== Death and legacy ==
Fatima Meer died at St. Augustine's Hospital in Durban on 12 March 2010, at age 81, from a stroke she had two weeks earlier. A collection of Fatima Meer's political and academic writings entitled Voices of Liberation was published in 2019. Her paintings and drawings have been exhibited at Constitutional Hill since August 2017.

== See also ==
- List of people subject to banning orders under apartheid
