= St Augustine College of South Africa =

University in Johannesburg, South Africa

Coordinates: 26.139167°S 28.004722°E

- Motto: Intellige ut credas (Latin)
- Motto in English: Understand that you may believe
- Type: Private Roman Catholic; Non-profit Coeducational; Higher education institution
- Established: July 13, 1999
- Founders: Prof (Sr) Edith Raidt
- Religious affiliation: Roman Catholic
- Location: Cedarwood Office Park, Mount Lebanon Road, Woodmead, Johannesburg, Gauteng, South Africa
- Patron Saint: Saint Augustine of Hippo
- Website: http://www.staugustine.ac.za/

St Augustine College of South Africa is a private tertiary academic institution in Johannesburg, South Africa.

== History ==
Shortly after the formal establishment of the Catholic hierarchy in South Africa in 1951, it was first proposed to found a Catholic university in the country. The idea was taken a step further in 1993 when a discussion group – initiated by Professor Emmanuel Ngara, then the Deputy Vice-Chancellor at Fort Hare University, and including Catholic academics, clergy and business persons – began seriously to consider the matter. In June 1997, a board of trustees was constituted to guide the process, and, in November 1997, a Section 21 Company (not for profit) was registered. The name chosen for the proposed institution was ‘St Augustine’ – a conscious link to the African context, St Augustine of Hippo being one of the earliest Christian scholars produced by the continent. Having received recognition and accreditation with the South African Department of Education, on 13 July 1999, St Augustine was officially opened by the Deputy Minister of Education.

St Augustine was canonically recognised by a decree of the South African Bishops’ Conference in 2008; in the same year, it was recognised by the Congregation for Catholic Education, in the Vatican, as a Catholic University. Being Catholic, St Augustine operates in conformity with the provisions of the Code of Canon Law and the 1990 Apostolic Constitution of Pope John Paul II, Ex Corde Ecclesiae.

== Motto ==
The motto of St Augustine College is ‘Intellige ut credas’. According to St Augustine of Hippo, the two dimensions, faith and reason, should not be separated nor opposed, but rather go forward together. After his conversion, St Augustine held that faith and reason are ‘the two forces that lead us to knowledge’ (Contra Academicos, III, 20, 43). To this end the two famous Augustinian formulae (Sermons 43; 9) express this coherent synthesis between faith and reason: Crede ut intelligas (‘believe that you may understand’) – faith opens the way to step through the door of truth – but also, and inseparably, intellige ut credas (‘understand that you may believe’) – in order to find God and believe one must scrutinise truth. It is this second formula that was chosen as the motto of St Augustine College. In Ex Corde Ecclesiae, Pope John Paul II emphasises the relevance of the Augustinian formulae for Catholic universities: they ‘are called to explore courageously the riches of Revelation and of nature so that the united endeavour of intelligence and faith will enable people to come to the full measure of their humanity, created in the image and likeness of God, renewed even more marvellously, after sin, in Christ, and called to shine forth in the light of the Spirit’.

== Campus ==
When it first opened, St Augustine was situated in rented property on the site of the old Union Observatory in Johannesburg. Thanks to the support of the Catholic Diocese of Rottenburg-Stuttgart in Germany, in 2001, St Augustine purchased a campus from the Holy Family Centre, at 53 Ley Road in Victory Park, Johannesburg. In January 2023, it relocated to Cedarwood Office Park in Woodmead, Johannesburg.

== Governance and administration ==
In compliance with the South African Higher Education Act (Act No 101 of 1997) and its own Statutes, St Augustine is governed by a board of directors.

The Grand Chancellor of St Augustine is the ceremonial head, who, in the name of St Augustine, confers all degrees. The current Grand Chancellor is Most Rev Archbishop Jabulani Adatus Nxumalo OMI, Archbishop of Bloemfontein. (Although not a formal office bearer of St Augustine, ([Wilfrid Cardinal Napier] OFM, Archbishop of Durban, is the Patron.))

The President is the chief executive officer of St Augustine and is responsible for the day-to-day running of the institution; the President is accountable to the board of directors. The founding president of St Augustine was Professor Edith Raidt, a Schoenstatt religious sister and renowned expert in the history of the Afrikaans language. Professor Raidt was succeeded on her retirement in 2008 by Rev Dr Michael van Heerden, a Catholic priest. The third president, Dr Magdalene (Madge) Karecki, an American religious sister and expert in missiology, was succeeded from August 2015 until 2021 by Professor Garth Abraham, a South African international law scholar. Currently, St Augustine College is led by Professor Therese (Terry) Marie Sacco, an eminent educator.

The responsibility for regulating all teaching, research and academic functions of St Augustine lies with the Senate. The Academic Dean is responsible for leading the planning and implementation of existing programmes, and for the further development of curricula.

The Registrar directs the academic administration of St Augustine and liaises with all relevant state departments to ensure the continued registration and accreditation of its academic offerings. Currently, the Academic Dean is Professor Jaco Kruger, a graduate from the University of South Africa (UNISA), and the Acting Registrar is Professor Terry Sacco, Head of the Department of Social Sciences.

== Degrees and courses offered ==
The academic programme at St Augustine is offered through five departments: Theology, Philosophy, Applied Ethics and Peace Studies, Education, and Undergraduate Studies. At the post-graduate level, the following degrees are offered: BA (Hons) in Philosophy; BA (Hons) in Peace Studies; BTh (Hons); MPhil in Theology; MPhil in Applied Ethics; MPhil in Culture and Education; DPhil in Philosophy; DPhil in Theology. At the undergraduate level, the BA and the BTh are offered. All degrees are approved and accredited by the South African Council for Higher Education, the South African Qualifications Authority, and the South African Department of Higher Education and Training.

St Augustine also offers the Higher Certificate in Biblical Studies (through contact and distance learning), and a variety of short courses for lifelong learning.

== Academics ==
Apart from the academic staff permanently attached to St Augustine, contributions are regularly made by visiting academics.

St Augustine is home to the Africa Peacebuilding Institute (API); a ‘virtual’ institute – founded with the assistance and expertise of the Mennonite Central Committee – that provides regular training on civilian peacebuilding capacity. Those who have received training through the API are to be found across the world, including in the United Nations and regional peacebuilding organisations.

St Augustine is recognised as a Research Institution (19 August 2010) by South Africa's National Research Foundation; the academic staff publish regularly in their fields of interest and expertise. The in-house journal of the institution is the bi-annual The St Augustine Papers.

In addition to its collection of electronic material and its collection of relevant journals, the St Augustine library holds in excess of 40,000 books. Within the library is the ‘Grimley Library’, a unique collection of 1,665 books addressing Theology, Philosophy and Liturgy, brought to South Africa by Rev Dr Thomas Grimley, the second Catholic Bishop of Cape Town; the collection is one of the oldest in South Africa, including many titles that date back to the 17th and 18th centuries.

== Bonum Commune Award ==
The Bonum Commune Award is the highest that St Augustine is able to bestow; it seeks to honour those who have made an outstanding contribution to the common good, or who have made a significant and exceptional contribution to the academic endeavour, particularly those who have contributed in some way to the welfare and improvement of society.

To date, the following persons have received the award:

- Pius Ncube, Archbishop of Bulawayo (November 2005)
- Walter Cardinal Kasper, President of the Pontifical Council for the Promotion of Christian Unity (November 2006)
- William Lynch, businessman, Johannesburg (November 2007)
- Karl Cardinal Lehman, Bishop of Mainz (February 2008)
- Prof Gustavo Guiterrez OP, Priest and Theologian, Peru (February 2008)
- John Kane-Berman, Director of the South African Institute of Race Relations, Johannesburg (April 2010)
- Conrad Strauss, businessman, Johannesburg (April 2011)
- Kevin Dowling, Bishop of Rustenburg (April 2011)
- Brendan Ryan, businessman, Cape Town (June 2013)
- Gavan Ryan, businessman, Cape Town (June 2013)
- Albert Nolan OP, Priest and Theologian, Johannesburg (May 2015)

== International connections ==
St Augustine is a member of a global network of Catholic universities. Apart from its connection with individual universities, St Augustine belongs to the International Federation of Catholic Universities (IFCU), the Association of Catholic Universities and Higher Institutes of Africa and Madagascar (ACUHIAM), as well as the International Council of the Universities of St Thomas Aquinas (ICUSTA). These connections with the ‘Universal Church’ allow for regular collaboration and exchange programmes.

== Notable alumni ==
- Prof Florian Pfeffel, Head of Studies, Management and Strategy, accadis Hochschule, Bad Homburg, Germany (D Phil in Philosophy, 2003)
- Judge Nigel Willis, Judge of the Supreme Court of Appeal, South Africa (MPhil in Theology, 2008)
- Hon Ms Sibongile Mchunu MP, ANC, South Africa (MPhil in Culture and Education, 2014)

== See also ==
- Roman Catholicism in South Africa
