= Shehnaz Meer =

South African judge (born 1955)

The Honourable Shehnaz Meer

Judge of the High Court
- Incumbent
- Assumed office 27 January 2003
- Appointed by: Thabo Mbeki
- Division: Western Cape

Judge of the Land Claims Court
- Incumbent
- Assumed office 1996
- Appointed by: Nelson Mandela

Personal details
- Born: Yasmin Shehnaz Meer; 28 June 1955 (age 71)
- Parents: Fatima Meer; I. C. Meer
- Education: University of Durban-Westville; University of Cape Town; University of Warwick

Yasmin Shehnaz Meer (born 28 June 1955) is a South African judge who has been acting Judge President of the Land Claims Court since 2012. She was appointed as a puisne judge in that court in 1996, and she has additionally been a judge of the Western Cape High Court since 2003. Before she joined the bench, she was an attorney at the Legal Resources Centre.

== Early life and career ==
Meer was born on 28 June 1955. Her mother was political activist Fatima Meer. After matriculating at the Durban Indian Girls' High School in 1972, she attended the University of Durban-Westville, where she completed a BA in 1975. Thereafter she completed an LLB at the University of Cape Town in 1979 and an LLM at the University of Warwick in 1982.

After serving her articles of clerkship at Dullah Omar's law firm, Meer was admitted as an attorney in 1983. She entered legal practice at the Legal Resources Centre in Cape Town, where she worked as an attorney on public interest litigation matters for the next 13 years. She was the centre's deputy national director from 1994 to 1996 and then its acting national director in 1996.

== Judicial career ==
Later in 1996, Meer was appointed as a judge in the newly established Land Claims Court, and she was among the five judges who sat in the first session of the court when it opened in June 1997.

In November 2002, President Thabo Mbeki announced that he would additionally appoint Meer as a judge of the Western Cape Division of the High Court of South Africa. She joined the High Court on 27 January 2003, and thereafter she divided her time between the High Court in Cape Town and the Land Claims Court in Johannesburg. One of her judgments in the High Court, on transparency in political party funding, was upheld by the Constitutional Court of South Africa in My Vote Counts v Minister of Justice and Correctional Services.

In 2012, after Land Claims Court Judge President Fikile Bam died, Meer was installed as the court's acting Judge President. She continued to hold that position in an acting capacity as of the end of 2023.

== Appellate courts ==
Meer was an acting judge in the Supreme Court of Appeal in 2011, and she has been nominated for elevation to the Constitutional Court on several occasions. She was shortlisted for elevation in 2003, and interviewed again in 2008. On two later occasions, in 2009 and 2021, she was nominated but withdrew from contention before the Judicial Service Commission held its hearings.

== Personal life ==
Meer is divorced and has three children.
