= Piet Koen =

South African judge (born 1959)

The Honourable Piet Koen

Judge of the High Court
- Incumbent
- Assumed office 1 November 2006
- Appointed by: Thabo Mbeki
- Division: KwaZulu-Natal

Personal details
- Born: Petrus Arnolus Koen; 13 September 1959 (age 67) Pietermaritzburg, Natal; Union of South Africa
- Education: University of Natal

Petrus Arnolus Koen (born 13 September 1959) is a South African judge who is currently serving in the KwaZulu-Natal Division of the High Court of South Africa. Before joining the bench in November 2006, he was Senior Counsel in Pietermaritzburg. He is best known for presiding in the corruption trial of former president Jacob Zuma from May 2021 until he recused himself in January 2023.

== Early life and education ==
Koen was born on 13 September 1959 in Pietermaritzburg in the former Natal Province. He matriculated at the Gert Maritz School in Pietermaritzburg and attended the University of Natal, where he completed a BCom in 1980 and an LLB in 1982.

== Legal career ==
Between 1985 and 1986, Koen completed his articles of clerkship at J Leslie Smith & Company. Thereafter the same firm retained him as a practising attorney, notary public and conveyancer. However, in 1988, he joined the bar; between then and 2006, he was a practising advocate in Pietermaritzburg, taking silk in 1998.

For part of that time, from 1990 to 1995, he was a part-time lecturer in contract law and civil procedure at the University of Natal. He was chairperson of the Pietermaritzburg Society of Advocates in 2005, following a two-year term as vice-chairperson, and, on several occasions in 2004 and 2005, he was an acting judge in the KwaZulu-Natal Division of the High Court of South Africa.

== KwaZulu-Natal High Court: 2006–president ==
On 1 November 2006, Koen joined the KwaZulu-Natal High Court bench permanently. He was appointed by President Thabo Mbeki on the recommendation of the Judicial Service Commission.

Among other notable matters, Koen presided in the drug trafficking trial of Sheryl Cwele, the wife of State Security Minister Siyabonga Cwele, and in Cape Bar Council v Judicial Service Commission, which established that Judicial Service Commission decisions were subject to judicial review under the principle of legality and which invalidated certain appointment decisions made by the commission in filling vacancies in the Western Cape High Court.

=== Jacob Zuma corruption trial ===
In May 2021, Koen was designated as the presiding judge in the corruption trial of former president Jacob Zuma and arms company Thales, Zuma's alleged co-conspirator in Arms Deal corruption. He handed down his first major ruling in that matter in October 2021, rejecting Zuma's special plea to halt prosecution on the grounds that, among other things, prosecutor Billy Downer was not competent to try the case. He denied Zuma leave to appeal the special plea judgement in February 2022, as did the Constitutional Court in December 2022.

However, in the interim, Zuma lodged a private prosecution against Downer, alleging that Downer had leaked confidential documents in contravention of the National Prosecuting Authority Act. In November 2023, Koen solicited submissions about the potential appropriateness of him recusing himself from Zuma's corruption trial, on the basis that he had already heard – and expressed himself unconvinced by – Zuma's arguments about Downer's alleged leak. Zuma's counsel, Dali Mpofu, argued strongly in favour of Koen's recusal. When the trial resumed in January 2023, Koen recused himself, saying that "it is what the sound administration of justice, the constitution and my conscience dictate" because his prior statements on the alleged leak could create the perception of bias.

=== Higher courts ===
Koen was an acting judge in the Supreme Court of Appeal between December 2014 and March 2015, between December 2019 and May 2020, and between October and November 2023. In April 2020, he wrote for the Supreme Court majority in Mahlangu v Minister of Police, which limited the Minister of Police's liability for unlawful detention until it was overturned by the Constitutional Court in 2021.

In February 2021, Koen was among eleven candidates whom the Judicial Service Commission shortlisted for possible appointment to one of five permanent vacancies at the Supreme Court of Appeal. During the interviews, which were held in April, Koen said that he took a "positivist" approach to judicial interpretation and aimed to "write judgments for the loser... the loser must understand why they have lost". He was also criticised at length by Chief Justice Mogoeng Mogoeng, who said that a 2016 judicial management meeting with Koen had been "one of my worst experiences". According to Mogoeng:

You were one of the leading voices in that meeting. It was one of the most unfortunate meetings a judge should ever have — and I am putting that in the lightest possible way... I was deeply concerned how you treat the advocates that appear before you — litigants and witnesses, and members of the public. I thought: how did he become a judge?... I am worried about discourtesy. You were extremely rude, it was completely unbefitting for a judge.

At the conclusion of the interviews, the Judicial Service Commission did not recommended Koen for appointment to the Supreme Court. Commentators objected to Mogoeng's "thin-skinned and overly personal" questioning of Koen, and 82 members of the KwaZulu-Natal Society of Advocates signed a statement in Koen's defence. The Mail & Guardian suggested in August 2021 that Mogoeng had misremembered or mischaracterised the 2016 meeting.

In October 2022, Koen was again interviewed for possible elevation, this time as one of eleven candidates for five new vacancies at the Supreme Court of Appeal. During his interview, he was asked about his approach to adjudicating Zuma's corruption trial. He also told the interview panel that he had "felt gutted by the criticism that had been expressed of me" during his last Judicial Service Commission, and he also provided transcripts and audio recordings of the 2016 meeting which Mogoeng had described. Deputy Chief Justice Mandisa Maya said that Mogoeng's description did not fit with her perception of Koen, who, when acting at the appellate court, had "always behaved impeccably". However, the Judicial Service Commission again declined to recommend Koen for appointment.

== Personal life ==
Koen has two children. According to a 2020 disclosure of financial interests, he held R7.7-million in managed investments.
