= Sydney Kentridge =

South African-born British lawyer and judge (born 1922)

Sir Sydney Kentridge KCMG KC SCOB
- Born: Sydney Woolf Kentridge; 5 November 1922 (age 103); Johannesburg, Transvaal, Union of South Africa
- Education: King Edward VII School, Johannesburg (matriculated 1938); University of Witwatersrand (graduated 1942); Exeter College, Oxford (graduated 1948)
- Occupations: Barrister, anti-apartheid activist and judge
- Years active: 1949–2013
- Known for: Apartheid-era political trials
- Spouse: Felicia Geffen (m. 1952; died 2015)
- Children: 4, including William

Sir Sydney Woolf Kentridge (born 5 November 1922) is a South African-born lawyer, judge and member of the Bar of England and Wales. He practised law in South Africa and the United Kingdom from the 1940s until his retirement in 2013. In South Africa, he played a leading role in a number of the most significant political trials in the apartheid-era, including the Treason Trial of Nelson Mandela and the 1978 inquest into the death of Steve Biko. Kentridge's wife, Felicia Kentridge, was also a leading anti-apartheid lawyer.

== Early life and education ==
Kentridge was born in 1922 in Johannesburg, the son of Lithuanian-born Jewish lawyer and politician Morris Kentridge (né Kantrovitch; 1881–1964). Sydney Kentridge attended Johannesburg's King Edward VII School, before studying at the University of Witwatersrand. He graduated in 1942, and served during the Second World War as an intelligence officer in the South African Army in East Africa and Italy. After the war, he attended Exeter College, Oxford, on an ex-serviceman's grant, and graduated with a first-class BA in Jurisprudence in 1948.

== Legal career ==
In 1949, after working briefly as a judge's clerk, Kentridge was admitted as an advocate of the High Court of South Africa. He was appointed a Senior Counsel in 1965. He became a leading defence lawyer in political trials in South Africa, with some of his major cases including the Treason Trial (1956–61), in which he defended Nelson Mandela, and the Prisons Trial (1968–69). A staunch opponent of apartheid, Kentridge represented three Nobel Peace Prize winners during his career – Mandela, Desmond Tutu and Albert Luthuli.

In 1978, he represented the family of the anti-apartheid activist Stephen Biko at the inquest following Biko's death in police custody on 12 September 1977. "There is indisputable evidence," Kentridge said during the inquest, "that...Mr. Biko went into the interrogation room alive and well...[but] he came out a physical and mental wreck. He died a miserable and lonely death on a cold prison floor." Lord Alexander of Weedon wrote of his performance: "Through remorseless and deadly cross-examination, sometimes with brilliant irony, Kentridge established that the founder of the Black Consciousness Movement had been killed by police brutality. The verdict of accidental death was seen as risible." In a 1984 British television dramatisation of the Biko inquest, Kentridge was portrayed by Albert Finney.

Kentridge practiced at The English Bar between 1977 and 2013, and was appointed Queen's Counsel in 1984. He became a Bencher of Lincoln's Inn in 1985. He was a member of Brick Court Chambers, a leading London commercial set, and was widely regarded as the "elder statesman" of the English Bar before his retirement in 2013. Among his most notable cases in the UK was his successful defence of P&O Ferries against a charge of manslaughter in the wake of the 1987 Zeebrugge ferry disaster. Kentridge furthermore served as a judge in a number of jurisdictions, sitting as a Judge of Appeal in Botswana (1981–89), as a Judge of the Courts of Appeal of Jersey and Guernsey (1988–92) and as an Acting Justice of the South African Constitutional Court (1995–96). In the early 2000s, he was also the lawyer of Abdullah Öcalan in his application to the European Court of Human Rights (ECHR).

== Honours ==
Kentridge is a Knight Commander of the British Order of St Michael and St George (1999) and a Supreme Counsellor of the South African Order of the Baobab in Gold (2008). He has been awarded an Honorary LL.D. by the Universities of Leicester (1985), Cape Town (1987), Natal (1989), London (1995), Sussex (1997), Witwatersrand (2000) and Buckingham (2009). He was elected an Honorary Fellow of Exeter College, Oxford – his alma mater – in 1986. He is also a Fellow of the Institute of Advanced Legal Studies (1997), an Honorary Fellow of the American College of Trial Lawyers (1998) and an Honorary Member of the New York City Bar Association (2001). In March 2013, Kentridge was interviewed on the British radio show Desert Island Discs. In May 2013, he received a lifetime achievement award at the inaugural Halsbury Legal Awards. The South African General Bar Council awards an annual prize in Kentridge's name, the Sydney and Felicia Kentridge Award, for excellence in public interest law.

In November 2020, at the age of 98, Kentridge received the Helen Suzman Lifetime Achievement Award at the Absa Jewish Achiever Awards, in recognition of his legal career in South Africa and the United Kingdom. A biography of Kentridge focusing on his major apartheid-era cases, authored by Thomas Grant QC, was published in July 2022.

In 2024, at the South African Jewish Board of Deputies' 120th anniversary gala dinner, he was honoured among 100 remarkable Jewish South Africans who have contributed to South Africa. The ceremony included speeches from Chief Rabbi Ephraim Mirvis, and Kentridge was honoured among other lawyers such as Israel A. Maisels and Bob Hepple.

== Personal life ==
In 1952, Kentridge married Felicia Geffen, a lawyer and anti-apartheid activist who co-founded the South African Legal Resources Centre (LRC); Kentridge himself was a founding trustee of the LRC. He has lived in Maida Vale, London, since the 1990s, and has four children, nine grandchildren and four great-grandchildren. Kentridge's eldest son is the South African artist and filmmaker William Kentridge. Sydney Kentridge is a fan of cricket and opera, and is an uncle of the South African American musician and composer Trevor Rabin. He turned 100 in November 2022.
