= Thomas Grant (barrister) =

English barrister and author (born 1969)

Thomas Grant KC
- Born: Thomas Paul Wentworth Grant; 1969 (age 56–57); Colchester, Essex, England
- Education: Colchester Royal Grammar School; University of Bristol; City, University of London
- Occupations: Barrister and author

Thomas Paul Wentworth Grant KC (born 1969) is an English barrister and author. He has been appointed Visiting Professor of Politics and Law at Gresham College for 2020–2021 and for 2021–2022. Grant was appointed a Visiting Professor Law at the London School of Economics in 2022.

== Early life ==
Grant was born in Colchester, Essex. After obtaining a place at Colchester Royal Grammar School, he went on to read English at Bristol University, where he studied under the poet Charles Tomlinson and took a first-class degree. Grant went on to study law at City University in London.

== Legal career ==
Grant was called to the Bar in 1993. He completed a pupillage in the Chambers of George Carman QC at New Court in the Temple. His pupil masters included Hugh Tomlinson QC, with whom Grant appeared in the litigation relating to the construction of the Wembley stadium arch and the claim brought by the estate of the artist Francis Bacon against Marlborough Fine Art.

New Court Chambers dissolved in 2000, shortly before the death of Carman. Grant joined 9 Old Square Chambers before moving to Maitland Chambers, in Lincoln's Inn, in 2003. He joined Wilberforce Chambers in 2022.

Grant took silk in 2013. He practises in the areas of fraud, commercial, professional negligence and real estate litigation. He was involved in the proceedings brought by the Kazakh BTA Bank against its former chairman Mukhtar Ablyazov. He also acted for Boris Berezovsky in the claim brought by his former partner in 2013 and in later proceedings concerning Berezovsky's estate.

More recently he has represented UBS in its claim against Dr Vijay Mallya relating to his residence in Regent's Park. He appeared in proceedings against the art dealer Matthew Green arising out of his obtaining loans on the security of various works of art he purportedly owned.

In late 2019, Grant appeared for Simon Hume-Kendall in proceedings brought by the administrator arising out of the collapse of London Capital & Finance. In 2020, Grant was retained by the New Zealand businessman Eric Watson (businessman) in ongoing litigation brought by Owen Glenn. Grant is currently involved in ongoing litigation relating to the Venezuelan businessman Wilmer Ruperti and litigation involving the Mehta family In 2023, Grant acted for Oleg Deripaska at the trial of the contempt application brought against him by Vladimir Cerhnukhin.

In 2021, Grant was named Chancery Silk of the Year by Chambers and Partners.

In 2022, Grant became Chair of the Professional Negligence Bar Association.

== Legal writing ==
Grant and Hugh Tomlinson QC were the joint editors of Lender Claims, which was published in 2010 by Sweet and Maxwell.

In 2018, Grant co-edited with David Mumford QC Civil Fraud: Law, Practice and Procedure, again published by Sweet and Maxwell.

Grant is a contributor to The Law of Solicitors' Liabilities, edited by William Flenley QC and Tom Leech QC. The fourth edition was published in 2020.

== Publications ==
In 2015, Grant published Jeremy Hutchinson’s Case Histories, about the life and work of the criminal barrister Lord Hutchinson of Lullington QC, who turned 100 the same year. The book became a Sunday Times bestseller and was short-listed for the Crime Writers' Association Golden Dagger award. Writing in The Guardian, Richard Davenport-Hines noted the book's "pungency, intelligence and humour."

In 2016, Grant contributed an introduction to the re-issue of Sybille Bedford's essay The Trial of Lady Chatterley by Daunt Books.

In 2019, Grant published Court Number One: The Old Bailey Trials that Defined Modern Britain. The book was an Evening Standard best seller and was a Times and Telegraph book of the year. Writing in the Observer, Alexander Larman noted that "there is plenty of humour throughout…but this is ultimately an affecting study of how the law gets it right – and wrong." Writing in the Daily Telegraph, Jake Kerridge described the book as "a hamper of treats".

In an interview in Counsel Magazine in March 2020, Grant explained that: "There were a number of themes I wanted to pick up: changing attitudes to the death penalty, obscenity and sexual behaviour over the century; women’s experience of the criminal law – largely its inability to understand or properly respond to why women sometimes commit acts of violence; the centrality of the Old Bailey to treason, post-war espionage and political downfall; and the courtroom as a place of ritualised entertainment for the masses."

In 2022, Grant published The Mandela Brief: Sydney Kentridge and the Trials of Apartheid, about the South African barrister Sir Sydney Kentridge. The Spectator described the book as "well-written, deeply researched and wholly gripping". Grant appeared on Gareth Cliff's podcast to discuss the book

Over the past few years, Grant has co-written and appeared in a production that is performed in Court One of the Old Bailey, entitled Trial and Error. Reviewing the play for The Oldie in 2017, Valerie Grove wrote: "Courtrooms are pure theatre, and all lawyers are thespians manqués. No wonder Forever Trial and Error, performed this week by a brilliant cast, mainly of barristers, in wood-panelled Court Number 1 at the Old Bailey – scene of famous trials from Oscar Wilde and Ruth Ellis to Lady Chatterley and Profumo – knocks most current West End offerings into a cocked hat." Grant was the subject of a profile in Counsel magazine in August 2022

== Journalism ==
Grant writes regularly for The Times newspaper, both as a book reviewer and in its law pages. In August 2019, he reviewed former Supreme Court judge Jonathan Sumption’s book Trials of the State, writing that Sumption was "becoming one of the dominant personalities of the age". He has also written for Counsel Magazine, the Daily Express, and The Spectator.

== Public speaking ==
Grant speaks regularly at festivals and other events. Speaking at the Charleston festival in 2016, he attracted press attention when he claimed that Jeremy Hutchinson, who had appeared for the defence against Mary Whitehouse in The Romans in Britain trial, now felt some sympathy for her.

In 2019, Grant appeared with Rosie Boycott and Geoffrey Robertson QC at the Hay Festival and with Jonathan Aitken at the Henley festival. In the same year he was interviewed by Judge Edward Bindloss at the Ilkley literary festival.

In 2020, Grant appeared in three podcasts for CrimeHub, discussing famous murder trials of the 20th century. He also appeared in "Stealing Victory", a podcast presented by Tom Pettifor about the theft of the World Cup in 1966.

In October 2020, Grant gave his first Gresham College lecture in a series entitled the Politics of the Courtroom. Speaking about the political lawyer, Grant drew attention to the targeting of lawyers in Turkey and other countries. In October 2021, Grant commenced a second Gresham lecture series on the Misrule of Law.

In October 2021, Grant appeared at a mock trial at the Supreme Court organised by the charity Classics for All, defending Queen Boudica on a charge of terrorism. The Times reported that Grant posed the question "'What have the Romans ever done for us?' Apart, he conceded, from the aqueduct." Boudica was acquitted by the jury.
