= Clive Plasket =

South African judge

Judge of the Supreme Court of Appeal
- In office 2019–2022
- Appointed by: Cyril Ramaphosa

Judge of the High Court
- In office 1 June 2003 – 2019
- Appointed by: Thabo Mbeki
- Division: Eastern Cape

Personal details
- Born: Clive Michael Plasket; 3 October 1957 (age 69) Springs, Transvaal; Union of South Africa
- Spouse: Adrienne Carlisle
- Education: University of Natal; Rhodes University (PhD)

Clive Michael Plasket (born 3 October 1957) is a South African jurist and retired judge who served in the Supreme Court of Appeal from 2019 to 2022. He was formerly a judge of the Eastern Cape High Court from 2003 to 2019. Before that, he was a practising attorney and a legal academic at Rhodes University, renowned especially as an expert on administrative law.

== Early life and education ==
Plasket was born on 3 October 1957 in Springs in the former Transvaal. He attended the Christian Brothers College in Springs and matriculated in 1975 at De La Salle College in Johannesburg.

Thereafter he enrolled at the University of Natal's Pietermaritzburg campus, where he completed a BA in 1980, an LLB in 1982, and an LLM in 1986. In 2003, after over a decade in practice, he completed a PhD at Rhodes University. His doctoral dissertation was on judicial review of administrative action in post-apartheid South Africa.

== Legal and academic career ==
Between his LLB and LLM graduations, Plasket was a temporary lecturer in law at the University of Natal from 1983 to 1984 and then a permanent lecturer at Rhodes's East London campus from 1984 to 1986. Thereafter he served his articles of clerkship in Johannesburg at Cheadle, Thompson & Haysom, the firm of Halton Cheadle, Fink Haysom, and Clive Thompson. After he was admitted as an attorney in July 1989, he remained at the firm as an attorney, gaining promotion to associate partner in 1990.

In 1991, Plasket left Cheadle, Thompson & Haysom for the Legal Resources Centre's Grahamstown office. Hired as an attorney, he was the office's director (initially in an acting capacity) from 1992 to 1997. In 1998, he moved to the firm of Netteltons, also in Grahamstown, where he remained until 2003. However, his work at Netteltons was part-time, as from 1998 Plasket was also a member of the law faculty at Rhodes University. He was a senior lecturer until he was promoted to associate professor in 2000, and he was regarded as an expert on administrative law. He was also an acting judge in the Eastern Cape Division of the High Court of South Africa on multiple occasions from 2001.

== Eastern Cape High Court: 2003–2019 ==
In April 2003, President Thabo Mbeki announced that, on the advice of the Judicial Service Commission, he would appoint Plasket to the bench as a permanent judge of the Eastern Cape High Court. He took office on 1 June 2003.

Notable judgements written by Plasket in the High Court included Premier of the Eastern Cape v Ntamo, on customary law, and Tripartite Steering Committee v Minister of Basic Education, on the government's constitutional obligations arising from the right to basic education.

=== Appellate matters ===
During his service in the High Court, Plasket was seconded to the Supreme Court of Appeal as an acting judge on multiple occasions. He wrote several reported judgements for the appellate court as an acting judge, including, with Judge Mahomed Navsa, the judgement in City of Johannesburg Metropolitan Municipality v Blue Moonlight Properties (an appeal of Blue Moonlight Properties v Occupiers of Saratoga Avenue), which was upheld in the Constitutional Court in December 2011. He also sat as an acting judge in politically controversial matters, including Democratic Alliance v President, on Menzi Simelane's appointment to the National Prosecuting Authority.

=== Judicial Service Commission interviews ===
The Judicial Service Commission thrice shortlisted and interviewed Plasket as a candidate for possible elevation. On the first occasion, in April 2012, he was one of five candidates for two vacancies on the appellate court. Although he was considered a frontrunner, although the interview panel praised his "impressive CV", and although the Mail & Guardian said that commissioners from opposition parties "appeared enamoured" of him, the Judicial Service Commission did not recommend him for appointment; Xola Petse and Ronnie Pillay were appointed instead, although the Mail & Guardian reported that Plasket was popular among the sitting judges of appeal and that he would be "favoured when future vacancies occur".

One year later, Plasket was interviewed for two new vacancies on the Supreme Court of Appeal. During that interview, which lasted two hours, he was subjected to "brutal" questioning about affirmative action in the judiciary. Afterwards, Nigel Willis and Halima Saldulker were the commission's recommendations for elevation, and commentators were highly critical about the perceived difference in tone during the commission's interview of Willis, who, like Plasket, was a white man. Richard Calland, for example, suggested that the commission was biased against Plasket because of his demonstrated political independence.

In February 2019, the Judicial Service Commission announced that it had shortlisted Plasket for an appellate appointment for a third time, now as one of nine candidates for five vacancies. During the interview, held in April, he was again questioned about affirmative action, and also about the Blue Moonlight judgement, socioeconomic rights, and land expropriation without compensation; Supreme Court of Appeal President Mandisa Maya complimented him as "a fearless fighter for the disadvantaged" whose "long battle" to ensure social justice in the Eastern Cape had created the perception that he was "an anti-government judge". After the interviews, Plasket was one of the candidates whom the Judicial Service Commission recommended for elevation (alongside Daniel Dlodlo, Caroline Nicholls, Fikile Mokgohloa, and Thokozile Mbatha), and his appointment was confirmed by President Cyril Ramaphosa in June 2019.

== Supreme Court of Appeal: 2019–2022 ==
Plasket served in the Supreme Court of Appeal from 2019 until his retirement in 2022. Notable judgements penned by him included Cash Paymaster Services v Chief Executive Officer of the South African Social Security Agency, on the tender for social grants provision, and Esau v Minister of Co-Operative Governance and Traditional Affairs, on the legality of the COVID-19 lockdown.

== Later academic appointments ==
After his appointment as a judge, Plasket was a visiting professor at Rhodes University between July 2003 and October 2014; he also served on the university council from 2008 to 2012. In addition to publishing further articles while on the bench, he was involved in several academic journals – the advisory board of Speculum Juris and the editorial boards of African Public Procurement Law Journal and Southern African Public Law – and he was an honorary law professor at the University of KwaZulu-Natal from 2014 to 2016.

== Personal life ==
He is married to Adrienne Carlisle, with whom he has two children.
