= Mahendra Chetty =

South African judge

The Honourable Mahendra Chetty

Judge of the High Court
- Incumbent
- Assumed office 1 June 2014
- Appointed by: Jacob Zuma
- Division: KwaZulu-Natal

Personal details
- Born: Mahendra Ramasamy Chetty; 31 May 1963 (age 63) Durban, Natal Province; South Africa
- Spouse: Marsha Chetty
- Education: University of Durban–Westville; New York University School of Law

Mahendra Ramasamy Chetty (born 31 May 1963) is a South African judge of the High Court of South Africa. He was appointed to the KwaZulu-Natal Division in June 2014. Before that, Chetty was an attorney for the Legal Resources Centre, where he worked between 1990 and 2014; he was the director of the centre's Durban office from 1999 onwards. He was admitted as an attorney in 1988.

== Early life and education ==
Chetty was born on 31 May 1963 in Durban in the former Natal Province. He was classified as Indian under apartheid, and he matriculated at Reservoir Hills High in Durban. Thereafter he read law at the University of Durban–Westville, where he was president of the Law Student Council in 1985. He graduating that year with a BA and LLB. Three years later, he received a Fulbright Scholarship to pursue an LLM at the New York University School of Law, which he completed in 1989.

== Legal career ==
Between 1986 and 1988, Chetty served his articles of clerkship at the firm of Wilkinson, Joshua & Gihwala in Athlone on the Cape Flats of Cape Town. He was admitted as an attorney in March 1988. After his hiatus for further education in New York, he joined the Legal Resources Centre in 1990. He was an attorney at the centre for the next 24 years, based in Johannesburg until 1995 and thereafter in Durban. He was the director of the Legal Resources Centre's Durban office between 1999 and 2014.

From 1994 to 2013, Chetty was also an arbitrator and mediator under the Independent Mediation Service of South Africa (later Tokiso), a dispute resolution agency, and he chaired KwaZulu-Natal's Town Planning Appeals Board and Development Facilitation Appeals Tribunal between 2008 and 2013. He acted as a judge for the first time in early 2013, sitting in the Labour Court between January and March 2013. Thereafter he acted in the High Court of South Africa, first in the North Gauteng Division from April to June 2013 and then in the KwaZulu-Natal Division in November 2013.

== KwaZulu-Natal High Court: 2014–present ==
In April 2014, Chetty was one of nine candidates whom the Judicial Service Commission shortlisted and interviewed for possible permanent appointment to four vacant seats in the KwaZulu-Natal High Court. Although his interview generally proceeded smoothly, he was confronted about his background as a human rights lawyer at the Legal Resources Centre: Fatima Chohan, who was a member of the commission and the Deputy Minister of Home Affairs, said that she would be "slightly discomfited" if a judge with Chetty's "activist background" was required to rule impartially in a dispute between indigent populations and the state. Chetty responded that, "I am a fair person... The fact that I have acted my entire life for a group of people doesn't mean I will abdicate my judicial responsibility."

After the interviews, Chetty was among the four candidates whom the Judicial Service Commission recommended for appointment, the others being Nkosinathi Chili, Peter Olsen, and Thoba Poyo-Dlwati. President Jacob Zuma confirmed all four appointments the following month, and Chetty took office on 1 June 2014.

Among other notable High Court matters, Chetty presided in the corruption trial of Mike Mabuyakhulu, a former member of the Executive Council of KwaZulu-Natal; after a two-year trial, Chetty acquitted Mabuyakhulu in May 2023. The trial took place during the COVID-19 pandemic, and in September 2021, Chetty controversially ordered that all attendees at hearings – whether defendants, lawyers, supporters, or journalists – had to display proof of COVID-19 vaccination or a negative COVID-19 test result. Following media coverage of this directive, the Office of the Chief Justice released a statement clarifying that Chetty had made the order on his own discretion based on the wide degree of public interest in the Mabuyakhulu hearings.

Chetty was an acting judge in the Supreme Court of Appeal between June and September 2022 and between October and November 2023.

== Personal life ==
He is married to Marsha Chetty and has two children.
