= Mokgere Masipa =

South African judge

The Honourable Mokgere Masipa

Judge of the High Court
- Incumbent
- Assumed office 1 July 2016
- Appointed by: Jacob Zuma
- Division: KwaZulu-Natal

Personal details
- Born: 1 March 1974 (age 52) Mokopane, South Africa
- Education: University of the North (BProc); University of Natal (LLB); University of KwaZulu-Natal (LLM)

Mokgere Busisiwe Shareen Masipa (born 1 March 1974) is a South African judge of the High Court of South Africa. She was appointed to the KwaZulu-Natal Division in July 2016 after 14 years as a practising attorney in Durban. She is an expert on labour law.

== Early life and education ==
Masipa was born on 1 March 1974 at Mogalakwena Hospital in the former Transvaal Province. She spent her adolescence in the Northern Transvaal, matriculating at Ebenezer High School in Mokopane. Thereafter she went on to the University of the North, where she completed a BProc in 1996, and the University of Natal, where she completed an LLB in 1998. Later, while a practising attorney, she completed an LLM at the University of KwaZulu-Natal in 2015; her field was labour studies and her dissertation was titled, "The Effect of African Cultural Practices on Family Responsibility Leave."

== Legal career ==
After graduating from the University of Natal, Masipa began her legal career as a judge's associate in the Department of Justice; from 1998 to 2000, she was based in the Labour Court and Labour Appeal Court in Durban. During that time, she worked under Labour Court Judge Raymond Zondo, who later became Chief Justice of South Africa.

After that, from 2001 to 2002, she served her articles of clerkship at the firm of Anand-Nepaul Attorneys in Durban; she was admitted as an attorney of the High Court of South Africa in 2002. She remained at the firm as an attorney for five years thereafter, and the firm became Masipa-Nepaul Inc. in 2004 when she became a director. In 2007, Masipa founded her own firm, Masipa Inc.

In practice, Masipa was a specialist in labour law and an accredited mediator, with particular experience in the resolution of labour disputes. In this vein, she was a part-time commissioner at the Commission for Conciliation, Mediation and Arbitration from 2004 to 2016. She was also the chairperson of the disciplinary committee of the National Home Builders Regulatory Council from 2009 to 2011, and she served as a panelist in several industrial bargaining councils in sectors including public health and social development (2008–2013), public service (2008–2016), education (2008–2016), chemicals (2008–2016), public safety and security (2011–2016), and local government (2015–2016).

At the same time, Masipa was an acting judge in the Labour Court in July 2013. In 2015, she served as an assessor in a murder trial heard in the KwaZulu-Natal Division of the High Court, and later that year she acted for the first time as a judge in the High Court: she sat in the Pietermaritzburg High Court from July to September 2015 and in the Durban High Court from November 2015 to June 2016. She also participated in aspirant judges' training in 2016.

== KwaZulu-Natal High Court: 2016–present ==
In April 2016, Masipa was shortlisted and interviewed as a candidate for possible permanent appointment to the bench of the KwaZulu-Natal High Court. During the interviews in Cape Town, Masipa disclosed that the KwaZulu-Natal Law Society had made a finding of misconduct against her during her years in practice; Masipa said that the complaint arose from an apparent confusion related to the non-appearance of one of her clients in court, and that she had taken the finding on appeal. She was also asked about her experiences of sexism in the legal sector. After the interviews, she was one of three candidates whom the Judicial Service Commission recommended for appointment to the bench, and, in June, President Jacob Zuma confirmed her appointment to the KwaZulu-Natal Division with effect from 1 July 2016.

As of 2023, Masipa had written five reported judgements in the High Court, traversing criminal law, constitutional law, and family law. Among those judgements, NFM v John Wesley School affirmed that although private schools were autonomous, they were bound by the provisions of the South African Schools Act and the Constitution, particularly the best interests of the child provision. Masipa therefore found that private schools were prohibited from taking unfair, humiliating, or exclusionary action against students in order to recover delinquent school fees.

=== Appellate courts ===
During her time in the High Court, Masipa was an acting judge in the Competition Appeal Court for two full years, throughout 2022 and 2023. She was also an acting judge in the Supreme Court of Appeal on three occasions, between June and September 2022, April and May 2023, and October and November 2023. While in the Supreme Court, Masipa single-authored the court's majority decision in Louw v Patel, a medical malpractice matter; she also co-authored two other majority judgements and wrote a dissenting judgement. She again acted in the Supreme Court during 2024. While continuing to act as a judge of the Competition Appeal Court. During 2026, she was invited to and acted in the Labour Appeal Court.

=== 2023 appellate nomination ===
In October 2023, Masipa was among the 11 candidates whom the Judicial Service Commission shortlisted and interviewed for possible permanent appointment to one of four judicial vacancies in the Supreme Court of Appeal. During the interview, she was praised for the independence that she had displayed in writing dissenting judgements and for her experience in labour law, but Xola Petse, the Deputy President of the Supreme Court, pointed out that labour matters were more likely to be dealt with in the Labour Appeal Court than in the Supreme Court. Petse also said that she had been invited to return to the Supreme Court as an acting judge because he believed that she would benefit from more acting experience on the appellate bench. Gauteng Judge President Dunstan Mlambo criticised Masipa for her delay in delivering a certain judgement, and Petse raised concern that appellate judgements allocated to her had been co-authored, rather than single-authored by Masipa.

The Judicial Service Commission did not recommend Masipa for appointment; indeed, although there were four vacancies, it recommended only Fayeeza Kathree-Setiloane and Shane Kgoele for elevation. Asked by the Council for the Advancement of the South African Constitution to provide reasons for this decision, the Judicial Service Commission outlined why the other nine candidates had not received the support of a majority of the commission; in Masipa's case, commissioners had apparently raised concerns about her relative inexperience.

== Personal life ==
Masipa is unmarried and has two children.
