= Felicia Kentridge =

South African lawyer and activist (1930–2015)

Felicia, Lady Kentridge
- Born: Felicia Nahoma Geffen; 7 August 1930; Johannesburg, South Africa
- Died: 7 June 2015 (aged 84); Maida Vale, London, England
- Other names: Felicia, Lady Kentridge
- Education: University of Cape Town; University of the Witwatersrand
- Occupations: Lawyer, anti-apartheid activist and artist
- Spouse: Sir Sydney Kentridge (m. 1952)
- Children: 4, including William

Felicia, Lady Kentridge (née Geffen; 7 August 1930 – 7 June 2015) was a South African lawyer and anti-apartheid activist who co-founded the South African Legal Resources Centre (LRC) in 1979. The LRC represented black South Africans against the apartheid state and overturned numerous discriminatory laws; Kentridge was involved in some of the Centre's landmark legal cases. Kentridge and her husband, the prominent lawyer Sydney Kentridge, remained involved with the LRC after the end of apartheid, though they moved permanently to England in the 1980s. In her later years, Kentridge took up painting, and her son William Kentridge became a famous artist.

== Biography ==
=== Early life and education ===
Felicia, Lady Kentridge was born Felicia Nahoma Geffen in Johannesburg in 1930, the younger daughter of a Jewish legal family; her mother was South Africa's first female advocate. Felicia studied law at the University of Cape Town and later the University of the Witwatersrand, obtaining her LLB from the latter in 1953. In 1952, while still studying, she married Sydney Kentridge, a lawyer who went on to defend Nelson Mandela and other leading anti-apartheid figures in the Treason Trial of 1956.

=== Anti-apartheid activism ===
Felicia and Sydney Kentridge were both staunch opponents of apartheid, and Felicia sought to overturn the legal basis for segregation and discrimination in South Africa. In the early 1970s, she visited the United States to study the work of public-interest legal centres, and was inspired to found a similar legal clinic for impoverished South Africans in 1973. In 1979, under the direction of American civil rights attorneys Jack Greenberg and Michael Meltsner, she and a group of other prominent anti-apartheid lawyers, including her husband Sydney and Arthur Chaskalson, set up the Legal Resources Centre (modeled on the NAACP Legal Defense and Educational Fund, of which Greenberg was then director-counsel) to campaign for human rights and judicial fairness for black South Africans. Kentridge travelled abroad to gather support for the LRC, and managed to win funding from institutions such as the Carnegie, Ford and Rockefeller Foundations. She ran the LRC's administrative affairs and also contributed to some of its most important legal victories, helping to overturn discriminatory laws such as the system of mandatory passes for black South Africans.

In the early 1980s, Kentridge and her husband moved to London, though she continued to travel to South Africa regularly to assist the LRC. She furthermore worked as the chairperson of the Legal Resources Trust, and helped to set up the Southern Africa Legal Services and Legal Education Project and the British Legal Assistance Trust, which later became part of the Canon Collins Education and Legal Assistance Trust. After the end of apartheid in 1994, Kentridge remained involved with the LRC, which continues to conduct public-interest legal work to the present day. The South African General Bar Council awards an annual prize named in Kentridge's honour, the Sydney and Felicia Kentridge Award, for excellence in public-interest law.

=== Later life and death ===
In her later years, Kentridge became a painter, working mostly in watercolour. She was eventually diagnosed with progressive supranuclear palsy, which ultimately left her paralysed. She died at home in Maida Vale, London, in June 2015.

== Personal life ==
In 1952, Geffen married Sydney Kentridge (now Sir Sydney), a South African lawyer and one-time Constitutional Court judge, who survived her. At the time of her death in 2015, she had four children, nine grandchildren and one great-grandchild. Her eldest son, William, is a South African artist, public speaker and filmmaker.
