= Halima Saldulker =

South African judge

The Honourable Halima Saldulker

Judge of the Supreme Court of Appeal
- Incumbent
- Assumed office 1 July 2013
- Appointed by: Jacob Zuma

Judge of the High Court
- In office 1 August 2004 – 30 June 2013
- Appointed by: Thabo Mbeki
- Division: Gauteng

Personal details
- Born: 6 February 1957 (age 69) Durban, Natal; Union of South Africa
- Education: University of Durban–Westville

Halima Khanam Saldulker (born 6 February 1957) is a South African judge of the Supreme Court of Appeal. She began her judicial career as a judge in the South Gauteng High Court from August 2004 to July 2013, when she was appointed to the Supreme Court. Before that, she practiced as an advocate in Johannesburg between 1988 and 2004.

== Early life and education ==
Saldulker was born on 6 February 1957 in Durban in the former Natal Province (present-day KwaZulu-Natal). She attended Juma Musjid Girls School, neighbouring Durban's Juma Mosque, and matriculated at Durban Indian High School in 1974. Thereafter she attended the University of Durban–Westville, completing a BA in 1977 and an LLB in 1979.

She worked for some time in the insurance sector before qualifying as an attorney. Subsequently, in 1988, she was admitted to the Johannesburg Bar, where she practiced as an advocate for the next 16 years. She was also involved in the General Council of the Bar, which she served as secretary and honorary assistant secretary from 1997 to 2001 and which she represented on the Legal Aid Board from 1998 to 2004.

== Judicial career ==
In July 2004, on the recommendation of the Judicial Service Commission, President Thabo Mbeki announced Saldulker's appointment to the bench of the Transvaal High Court, later renamed the Gauteng High Court. She joined the bench on 1 August.

She served in the South Gauteng Division for nine years before, on 1 July 2013, she joined the bench of the Supreme Court of Appeal. She was appointed by President Jacob Zuma following interviews in which her performance was largely overshadowed by the controversy surrounding the questioning of a fellow contender, Eastern Cape judge Clive Plasket.

== Personal life ==
She is married to Goolam Saldulker, with whom she has two daughters and a son.
