= Johannesburg Central Police Station =

Police station in Johannesburg, South Africa

Coordinates: 26°12′23″S 28°1′53″E

- Interactive map of the Johannesburg Central Police Station area

General information
- Status: Completed
- Type: Police Station
- Location: 1 Commissioner Street, Johannesburg
- Completed: 1968

Technical details
- Floor count: 13

Design and construction
- Architects: Harris Fels Jankes and Nussbaum

The Johannesburg Central Police Station is a South African Police Service police station in downtown Johannesburg, South Africa. From its unveiling in 1968 until September 1997, it was called John Vorster Square, after Prime Minister B.J. Vorster.

== History ==
John Vorster Square was officially opened on the 23 August 1968 by John Vorster, then the prime minister of the Republic of South Africa. It was a 10 storey, blue-coloured cement building. The ninth and tenth floors were occupied by the Security Branch of the South African Police, while the detainees cells were on the lower floors of the building. In September 1997, John Vorster Square was renamed Johannesburg Central Police Station, and the decorative bust of Vorster was removed. It now houses the South African Police Service.

== Under Apartheid ==
=== Detention ===
During Apartheid, the station was a notorious site of interrogation, torture and abuse by the Security Branch of the South African Police of anti-apartheid activists, many of whom, after 1982, were held under the Internal Security Act. John Vorster Square was also used as a detention centre mostly for political activists; those sent into "detention" were not allowed to have any contact with family members, lawyers or any outside help; they were cut off from the world. Detention could last for a few hours to a few months, depending on the police.

=== Deaths ===
Of the 73 known deaths of political activists in police custody in South Africa between 1963 and 1990, eight (11 percent) were at John Vorster Square. Government and police officials claimed that the large number of deaths were due to politically motivated suicides, in the words of one police official as part of a "communist plot." These deaths spurred the protest poem 'In Detention' by Chris van Wyk. Even when the reported cause of death was corroborated by an official inquest, civil society largely mistrusted the police's accounts of the deaths. At the Truth and Reconciliation Commission, police officers and activists testified extensively about the use of torture in detention, and three of the inquests into deaths at John Vorster have since been reopened.

Five of the deaths at John Vorster were recorded as suicides, on which the Commission concluded the following:

[G]iven the extensive evidence of physical as well as psychological torture, suicides under conditions of detention should be regarded as induced suicide for which the security forces and the former government are accountable.

==== 1971: Ahmed Timol ====
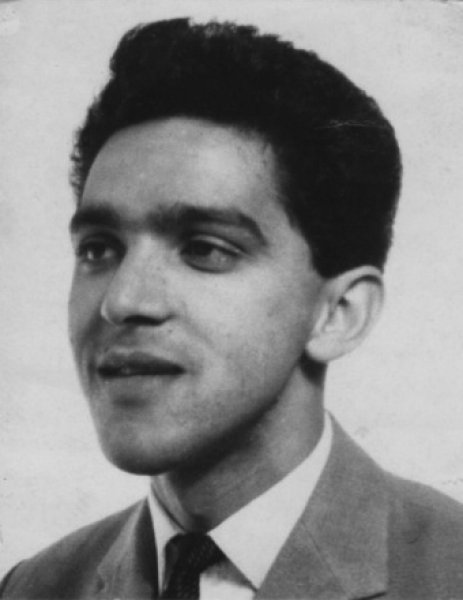
Police officers pushed Ahmed Timol out of the window at John Vorster

The first detainee to die in John Vorster Square was Ahmed Timol, a 30 year old teacher and political activist and an underground member of the South African Communist Party and Umkhonto we Sizwe, the military wing of the African National Congress. On 27 October 1971, Ahmed Timol plunged to his death from the 10th floor five days after his arrest. The police claimed that he had committed suicide and an official inquest into his death in 1972 backed up this claim, despite evidence that he had been subjected to severe torture before his death. A subsequent inquest into Timol's death in 2017 overturned the ruling of the 1971 inquest, and found that Timol had indeed been murdered by the security police.

==== 1976: Wellington Tshazibane ====
The second detainee to die in John Vorster Square was Wellington Tshazibane. On 11 December 1976 he was found hanging dead in his cell. He had been arrested four days earlier for alleged complicity in an explosion at the Carlton Centre in Johannesburg. "An official inquest, much like the previous inquest into Timol's death, exonerated the police of any wrongdoing."

==== 1977: Elmon Malele and Matthews Mabelane ====
Elmon Malele was arrested on 10 January 1977 and died 10 days later of a brain hemorrhage at a nursing home in Johannesburg where he had been taken after he had allegedly lost his balance after standing for six hours (a standard torture technique) and hit his head on the corner of a table. An official inquest found that his death was due to natural causes, likely resulting from the injury occurring from the standing for several hours.

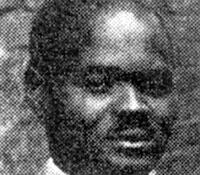
Elmon Malele died at John Vorster from a brain hemorrhage after falling and hitting his head on a desk

Less than a month later, on 15 February 1977, Matthews Mabelane plunged to his death from the 10th floor after having been detained. The police claimed that he had climbed out of the window onto a ledge in an attempt to escape and had slipped and fallen to his death. An inquest in April 1977 found the cause of death to be "Accidental". His family said that he had written a message to them on the lining of his trousers: "Brother Lasch, inform mom and other brothers that the police are going to push me from the 10th floor and I am bidding you goodbye forever."

==== 1982: Neil Aggett and Ernest Dipale ====
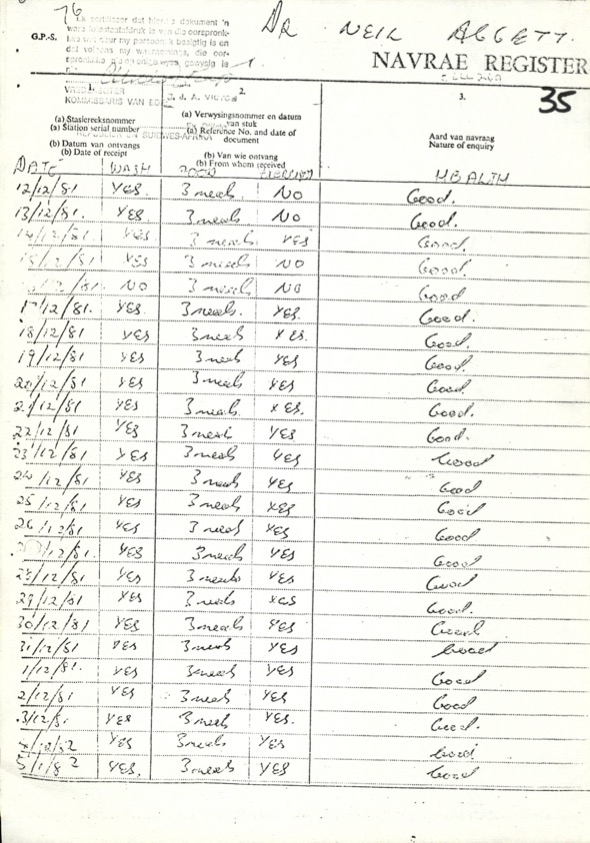
Enquiry Registrar for Neil Aggett, 1981. Entered into court records as an exhibit in Aggett's inquest.

Having been arrested in November 1981, Neil Aggett was found hanging dead in his cell 70 days later on 5 February 1982. He was one of many trade union organisers detained during that period whom the apartheid regime regarded as a threat. Although a high profile court case showed how Aggett's 80-hour interrogation on the weekend before his death had led to his emotional collapse, the security police were cleared of any wrongdoing.

Ernest Dipale was detained at the same time as Aggett in November 1981 and was released three-and-a half months later. He had made a statement to a magistrate complaining of assault and torture by electric shock but nothing came of his complaints. He was detained again on 5 August 1982 and held at John Vorster Square. Three days later he was found hanging dead in his cell. An inquest in June 1983 found no-one criminally liable for his death.

==== 1988: Stanza Bopape ====
Stanza Bopape was arrested on 10 June 1988 and went missing thereafter. The police said that he had escaped during transit while officers were changing a tyre. As late as 1990, government officials claimed to be investigating his whereabouts and said that he had been seen at the scene of a terror attack in April 1989. At the Truth and Reconciliation Commission, police officers testified that Bopape had died of a heart attack after being subjected to repeated electric shocks during interrogation. His body was dumped in the Nkomati River.

==== 1990: Clayton Sithole ====
The last death recorded at John Vorster Square was that of 20-year old Clayton Sithole, who was father of Zindzi Mandela's child and Nelson Mandela's grandchild. He had been arrested on suspicion of belonging to an African National Congress cell implicated in several murders. Police said he was found ''hanging from a shower pipe at police cells'' in a presumed suicide on 30 January 1990, only 11 days before Mandela was released from prison. President F.W. de Klerk appointed a judicial commission of inquiry, the first ever in such a case, to investigate his death. The commission was chaired by Richard Goldstone and confirmed that Sithole had committed suicide, presumably for reasons relating to the confession he had made to police about his involvement in several murders.
