= KwaZulu-Natal High Court =

Superior court of law in KwaZulu-Natal, South Africa

KwaZulu-Natal Division of the High Court of South Africa
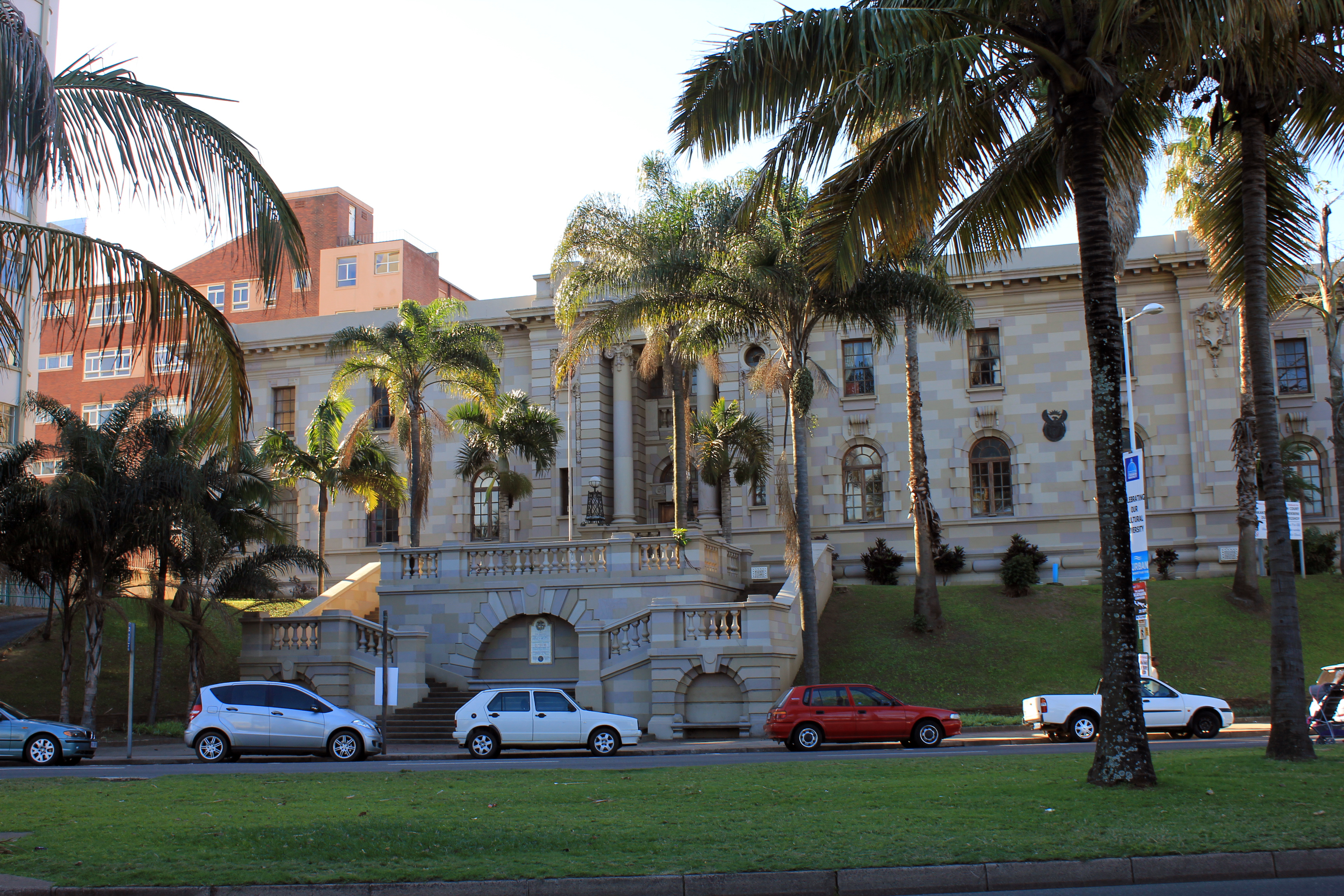
- The Durban courthouse of the KwaZulu-Natal Division
- Interactive map of KwaZulu-Natal Division of the High Court of South Africa
- 29.5994°S 30.3804°E
- Established: 1846 (Natal District Court)
- Jurisdiction: KwaZulu-Natal, South Africa
- Location: Pietermaritzburg (main seat), Durban (local seat)
- Coordinates: 29.5994°S 30.3804°E
- Composition method: Presidential appointment on the advice of the Judicial Service Commission
- Authorised by: Chp. 8 of the Constitution; Superior Courts Act, 2013
- Appeals to: Supreme Court of Appeal; Constitutional Court
- Number of positions: 30

Judge President
- Currently: Thoba Poyo-Dlwati

The KwaZulu-Natal High Court (in full the KwaZulu-Natal Division of the High Court of South Africa) is a superior court of law with general jurisdiction over the KwaZulu-Natal province of South Africa. The main seat of the division is at Pietermaritzburg, while a subordinate local seat at Durban has concurrent jurisdiction over the coastal region of the province. As of January 2024 the Judge President of the division is Thoba Poyo-Dlwati. The division has 30 permanent judges, with 15 (including the judge president and deputy judge president) seated in Pietermaritzburg, and 15 seated in Durban.

== History ==
The Natalia Republic, established in 1839 by Voortrekkers, was annexed by Britain in 1843 and renamed Natal. In 1844 it was attached to the Cape Colony, and in 1846 a District Court for Natal was established with its seat in Pietermaritzburg. In 1856 Natal was detached from the Cape and became a separate colony, and in 1857 the District Court was replaced by a Supreme Court of Natal. When the Union of South Africa was formed in 1910, the Supreme Court of Natal became the Natal Provincial Division of the Supreme Court of South Africa; at the same time, the circuit court at Durban became the Durban & Coast Local Division. When the current Constitution of South Africa came into force in 1997, the courts became High Courts, and in 2009 they were renamed the KwaZulu-Natal High Courts. In 2013, in the restructuring brought about by the Superior Courts Act, the courts became two seats of a single KwaZulu-Natal Division of the High Court of South Africa.

After former South African President Jacob Zuma failed to appear in court on 4 February 2020, the KwaZulu-Natal Division of the High Court of South Africa issued an arrest warrant against Zuma.

== Seats ==
Map of the areas of jurisdiction of the seats of the division

Following the 2022 report of a committee on rationalising the jurisdiction of High Court divisions,, the areas of jurisdiction of the seats of the KwaZulu-Natal division were reorganised with effect from 1 July 2026.

City	Coordinates	Jurisdiction	Former names
Pietermaritzburg (main seat)	29.5994°S 30.3804°E	Exclusive jurisdiction over Amajuba District Municipality, Harry Gwala District Municipality, Umgungundlovu District Municipality, Uthukela District Municipality, and Umzinyathi District Municipality; Concurrent appeal jurisdiction over the whole KwaZulu-Natal province	Natal District Court; Supreme Court of Natal; Natal Provincial Division; KwaZulu-Natal High Court, Pietermaritzburg
Durban	29.8621°S 31.0194°E	eThekwini Metropolitan Municipality, iLembe District Municipality, Ugu District Municipality, King Cetshwayo District Municipality, Umkhanyakude District Municipality, Zululand District Municipality	Durban Circuit Court; Durban & Coast Local Division; KwaZulu-Natal High Court, Durban

== Judges ==
As of January 2023, the permanent judges of the KwaZulu-Natal Division were:

- Thoba Poyo-Dlwati (Judge President)
- Isaac Madondo (Deputy Judge President)
- Piet Koen
- Dhaya Pillay
- N. H. Radebe
- R. Seegobin
- J. A. Ploos van Amstel
- G. Lopes
- Mahendra Chetty
- N. E. Chili
- P. C. Buizedenhout
- C. S. Sibiya
- M. T. Ncube
- R. G. Mossop
- G. N. Kruger
- K. Pillay
- S. R. Balton
- M. S. Moodley
- E. J. S. Steyn
- J. I. Henriques
- Z. P. Nkosi
- R. A. K. Vahed
- P. J. Olsen
- Mokgere Masipa
- K. Q. Hadebe
- S. B. Mngadi
- B. S. M. Bedderson
- M. E. Nkosi

== See also ==
- Category:Judges of the KwaZulu-Natal High Court
