= Richard Calland =

British-South African writer and political analyst

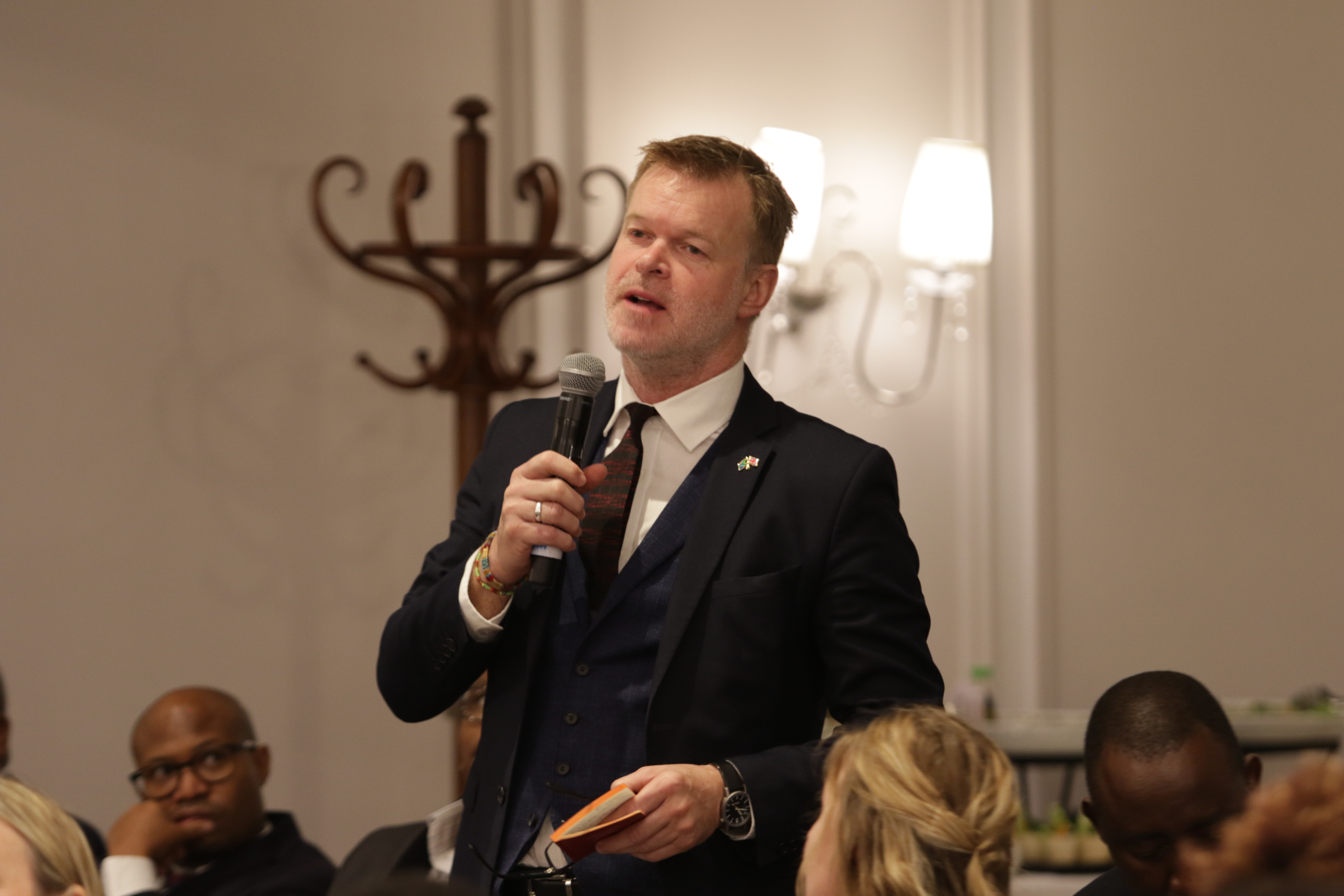
Calland in 2018

Richard J. T. Calland (born 10 July, 1964) is a British-South African writer and political analyst. Until 2023 Calland was associate professor of public law at the University of Cape Town. He subsequently was appointed adjunct associate professor at the Wits School of Government and a fellow of the Cambridge Institute for Sustainability Leadership. He is a co-director of Sustainability Education and has been a columnist for the Mail & Guardian since 2001.

== Biography ==
=== Education ===
Calland read law at Durham University (Hatfield College) and was called to the bar at Lincoln's Inn in 1987. Whilst at Durham, Calland wrote for the student newspaper criticising the policing of the 1984 Miners' Strike and Thatcherism more widely, calling for it to be replaced with "a fresh radical consensus". Apart from his undergraduate degree he holds an LLM from the University of Cape Town and a postgraduate diploma in world politics from the London School of Economics.

=== Career ===
Calland practiced as a barrister in London until 1994, when he moved to South Africa to work as an advisor to the ANC in the Western Cape before the upcoming election.

From 1995 to 2011 he headed the Political Monitoring & Information Service at IDASA. In 2005 he was a visiting scholar at the Lauterpacht Centre for International Law at Cambridge University. Other than democratic governance, his academic interests include sustainable development and climate finance. He is the author of several books on the Politics of South Africa, among them, The Zuma Years: South Africa's Changing Face of Power, published in 2013.

Along with Lawson Naidoo and Ian Farmer, Calland is co-founder of the Paternoster Group, a political consulting company. Calland also co-founded the Council for the Advancement of the South African Constitution (CASAC) with Naidoo.

In 2017 Calland was embroiled in a controversy in which activists raised concerns about "the foreign corporations that The Paternoster Group works with, about the use by Naidoo and Calland of their position in civil society to promote their business venture, about their sources of income, and about the link to Marikana". The activists criticised the association between Paternoster and Ian Farmer who was CEO of Lonmin at the time of the Marikana Massacre. Paternoster had produced a report on the Marikana massacre which the activists claimed "seems to engage in special pleading on behalf of Lonmin". In the resulting fallout the SaveSA campaign cut ties with CASAC.

In September 2022, Speaker of the Parliament of South Africa, Nosiviwe Mapisa-Nqakula appointed him to the Panel constituted in terms of section 89 of the Constitution of South Africa to determine whether there was a prima facie case to against President of South Africa, Cyril Ramaphosa based on the heist on his farm, Phala Phala, in Limpopo. However, due to objections raised by the Democratic Alliance and Economic Freedom Fighters on perceived biases, he resigned from the panel.

== Views ==
Commenting to the Chicago Tribune in 1999, he compared the charisma and charm of Nelson Mandela to Ronald Reagan. He has been critical of the proposal made by Thuli Madonsela that public servants implicated in corruption should be given the chance to apply for amnesty.
