= Terrorism Act, 1967 =

Law of the South African Apartheid regime

Parliament of South Africa
- Long title: Act to prohibit terroristic activities and to amend the law relating to criminal procedure; and to provide for other incidental matters.
- Citation: Act No. 83 of 1967
- Enacted by: Parliament of South Africa
- Assented to: 12 June 1967
- Commenced: 21 June 1967 (deemed retroactive to 27 June 1962)
- Repealed: 2 July 1982
- Administered by: Minister of Justice

Repealed by
- Internal Security Act, 1982
- Status: Repealed

The Terrorism Act No 83 of 1967 was a law of the South African Apartheid regime that was put in place to respond to violent resistance from people, groups and officials that the apartheid regime opposed. It categorized participation in any form of terrorist activity as a capital crime. The act was repealed with the implementation of the Internal Security Act of 1982; however, Section 7 remained in effect.

The act was originally put in place due to a form of modern terrorism being developed during the apartheid period. Terrorism was occurring due to activities of the state and because of liberation movements that were happening at the time. The acts stated purpose was to assist the government in combating terrorism; however, it was instead used by law enforcement to target and prosecute various organizations and individuals who had opposed state control. The Apartheid government used anti-terrorism laws to target those who opposed the regime. For instance, the government detained hundreds of members of the South West African People's Organization (SWAPO), a former independence movement in South West Africa. The enforcement of the act allocated security forces a large amount of control, and many individuals detained by police during this period had reported excessive use of force. At least 15 people died while in detainment during the first few years.

== Structure ==
The Terrorism Act of 1967 comprises ten sections, each addressing specific categories: Definitions; The Meaning of Terrorism; Harboring, Concealing, or Assisting Terrorists; Jurisdiction and venue; Trial Procedures for Offenses under the act; Detention of Terrorists and Other Persons for Interrogation; the Legal Process in criminal proceedings; Trial initiation by the Attorney General or Acting Attorney General; Commencement and Application of the Act; and Short title.

Section 1: This section of the Act provides essential definitions needed to understand the document including terms such as "commissioner", "minister", and "republic".

Section 2: The purpose of section 2 is to define exactly what terrorism is. Terrorism was defined as any activity aimed at disrupting law and order, or any action that encouraged others to engage in such acts.

Section 3: Section 3 of the act extended prosecution not only to those who committed the offense but also to anyone found to be assisting, even if they were not directly involved. Conviction under this section could result in a prison sentence of up to five years or, in some cases, the death penalty.

Section 4 and 5: This section outlines who has authority over crimes that directly violate the terrorism act.

Section 6: Section 6 of the Act allowed someone suspected of involvement in terrorism—which was very broadly defined as anything that might "endanger the maintenance of law and order"—to be detained for a 60-day period (which could be renewed) without trial on the authority of a senior police officer. Since there was no requirement to release information on who was being held, people subject to the Act tended to disappear.

The death of Steve Biko in police custody in 1977, while being detained under the Act, was a particular cause célèbre. It is estimated that approximately 80 people died while being detained under the Act. The poem 'In Detention' was written by Chris van Wyk as a protest to the seemingly unexplainable deaths at the John Vorster Square, supposedly at the hands of police brutality.

Section 7: This section ensured that when someone was arrested and brought to trial, the judiciary retained some degree of oversight, preventing security forces from having complete control. This section is still enacted.

Section 8: Section 8 required the consent of the attorney general for any trial related to the terrorism act to proceed.

Section 9: This section explains how the Act came into operation and where it is applied.

Section 10: Section 10 specifies the official title of the Act as "The Terrorism Act of 1967."

== Other provisions ==
Other provisions of the Act included the founding of the Bureau of State Security.
