= List of post-secondary institutions in South Africa =

Location of South Africa

This is a list of post secondary educational institutions in South Africa. These institutions are not accredited degree-granting institutions. For a list of universities and other degree-granting institutions see List of universities in South Africa and List of business schools in South Africa.

Institution	Location(s)
G Vision Computer and Business Institutional College	Johannesburg
5th Dimension College of Visual Art	Johannesburg
Acsess Business Academy	Brits, East London, Port Elizabeth, Pretoria - as well as Distance education services
Assessment College	Johannesburg
Bantori Business College	Johannesburg, Pretoria
Baptist Theological College of Southern Africa	Randburg
Bible Institute of South Africa	near Cape Town
Boston City Campus and Business College	Multi-city
Boston House School of Design	
Business Management Training College	Johannesburg - Distance Education
CAMPUS International Hotel School	
Central Johannesburg College	Johannesburg
Centurion Academy	Centurion
College of Modern Montessori	Johannesburg
College of the Transfiguration	Grahamstown
College SA	Distance Education
Contemporary Music College	Pretoria
Design Academy of Fashion	
Design School Southern Africa	
Diamond Education College	Johannesburg
Durban Computer College	Durban
Durbanville College	Durbanville
Dunamis Degree Accreditation Association	
Education Facilitators	Randburg
Ekurhuleni West College	Multi-campus
False Bay College	Bellville, Khayelitsha, Muizenberg, Noordhoek, Tokai
Fasford Academy	Pretoria
Flavius Mareka FET College	Kroonstad, Mphohadi, Sasolburg
George Whitefield College	Cape Town
Global School of Business	Sandton
Greenside Design Center	Johannesburg
Grootfontein College of Agriculture	Middelburg, Eastern Cape
Hampton College (Durban, South Africa)	Durban
HTA School of Culinary Art	Johannesburg
Ikhala FET College	Aliwal North
Institute of Logistics and Supply Chain Management	South Africa
Industries Education & Training Institute (IETI)	Cape Town, Port Elizabeth, Johannesburg
Intec College	Distance Education
International Peace University of South Africa	
Kaizen Business Education Centre	Edenvale
K.I.B Accounting and Computer Training Centre	
La Musique	Paarl
Latitude Varsity	Cape Town
LearnLogic	Centurion
London School of University Studies	Johannesburg
Lovedale FET College	Alice, Eastern Cape
Lyceum College	Johannesburg - Distance Education
Mukhanyo Theological College	
National College of Photography	Johannesburg, Pretoria
Northlink College	Cape Town
Open Learning Group	South Africa
Port Elizabeth College	Port Elizabeth
Potchefstroom Akademie	Potchefstroom
Pretoriase Akademie vir Christelik-volkseie Hoër Onderwys	Pretoria
Professional Child Care College	
Professional Drafting Services	
Qualitas Business & Technology Academy	Bloemfontein, George, Kimberley, Newcastle, Vanderbijlpark
Qualitas Hair Academy	Bloemfontein, Kimberley, Newcastle, Tableview
Qualitas Health Academy	Newcastle
Qualitas School of Architecture & Building Construction	Bloemfontein
Qualitas Wellness Academy	Bloemfontein
Salon Magic Academy of Hairdressing	Durban
South African Academy for Hair and Skincare Technology	Potchefstroom
South African College of Applied Psychology	Cape Town
South African College of Herbal Medicine and Health	
South African Theological Seminary	Rivonia - Distance Education
Southern African Wildlife College	10 km from Kruger National Park
The Swiss Hotel School	Johannesburg
Timothy Ministry Team	Wellington

== See also ==
- Ranking of South African universities
- List of colleges and universities by country
- List of colleges and universities
- List of South African university chancellors and vice-chancellors
- List of medical schools in South Africa
- List of law schools in South Africa
- List of business schools in South Africa
- List of architecture schools in South Africa
- Higher Education South Africa
- Academic boycotts of South Africa (historical Apartheid-era)
