= List of universities in South Africa =

Location of South Africa

This is a list of universities in South Africa. In this list, colleges and universities are defined as accredited, degree-granting, tertiary institutions. As of September 2022, only South African public degree-granting institutions may call themselves a "university", whereas other accredited private for-profit or not-for-profit degree-granting institutions tend to call themselves colleges, institutes, or business schools.

Some of these private institutions are local campuses of foreign universities. Degree-granting institutions (both public and private) must be registered with, and have their specific degree programs accredited by, the Council on Higher Education.

In 2004 South Africa started reforming its public higher education system, merging and incorporating small public universities into larger institutions, and renaming all higher education institutions "university" (previously there had been several types of higher education institution).

The country's universities and "technikons", which were incorporated with others and thus no longer exist, are listed at the end of the article.

Two new universities were launched in 2013; Sol Plaatje University and the University of Mpumalanga. They are tentatively classified in the universities of technology category, pending clarification of their programs.

== Public universities ==
Public universities in South Africa are divided into three types: traditional universities, which offer theoretically oriented university degrees; universities of technology ("technikons"), which offer vocational oriented diplomas and degrees; and comprehensive universities, which offer a combination of both types of qualification.

=== Traditional universities ===
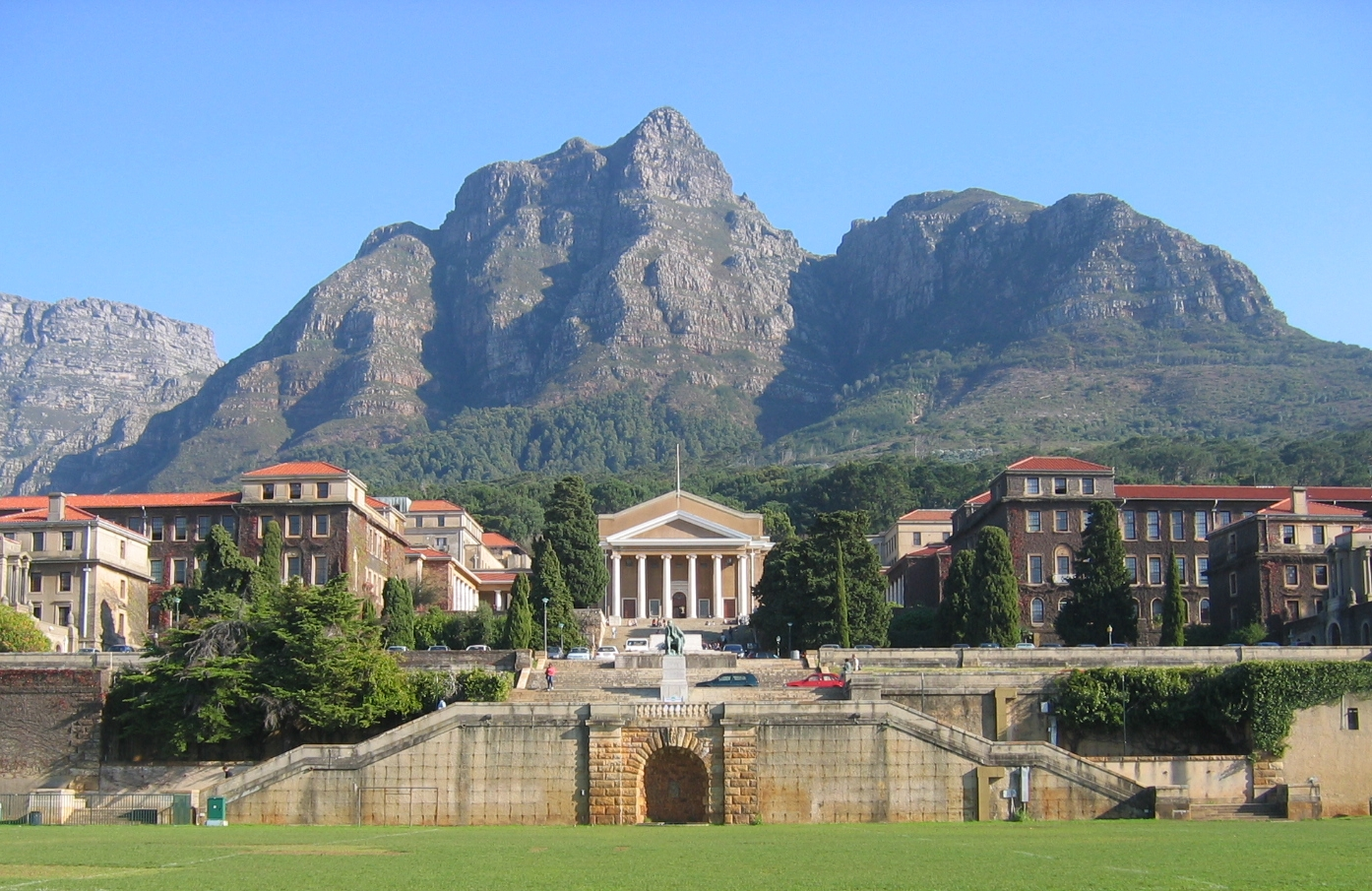
University of Cape Town

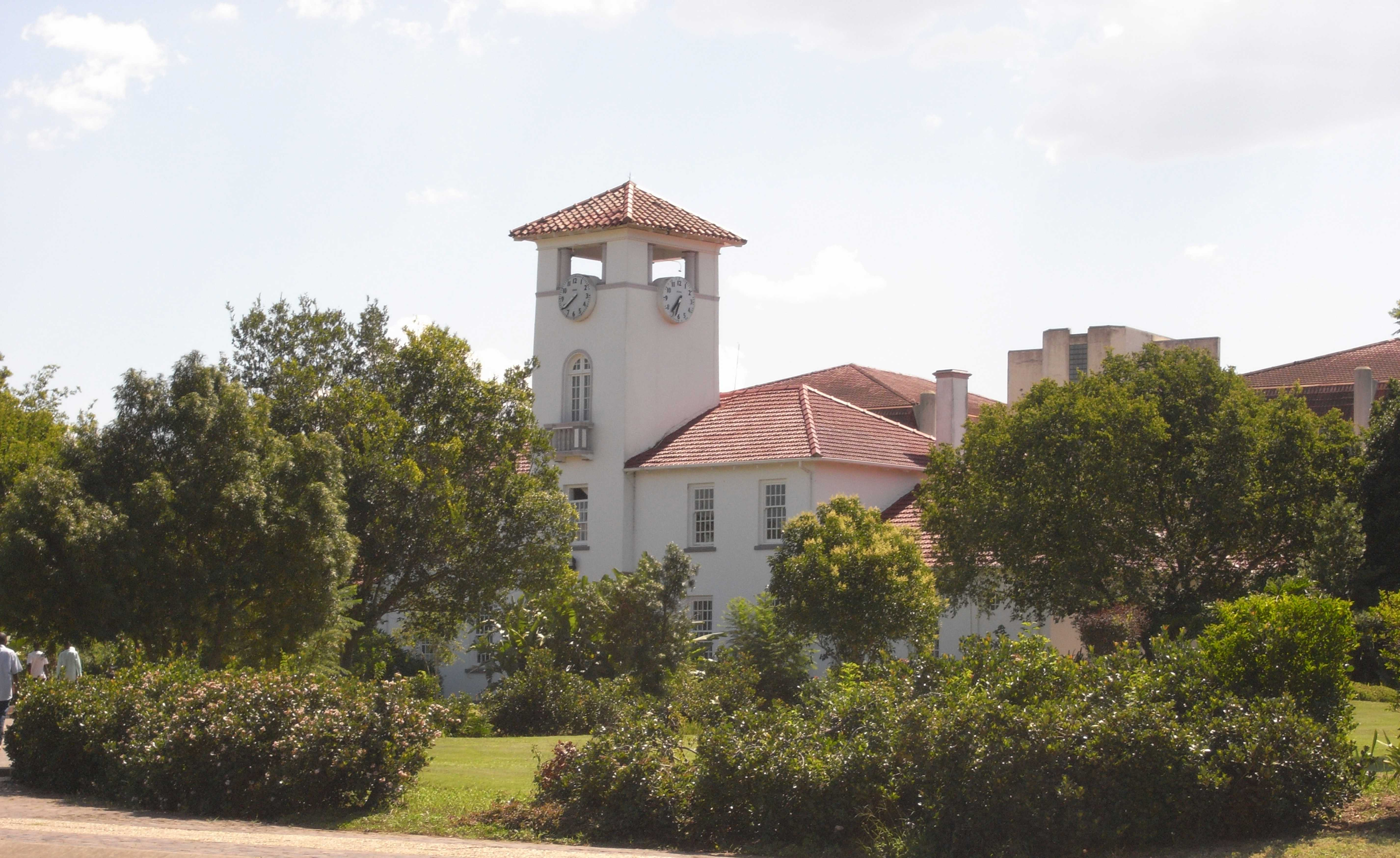
University of Fort Hare

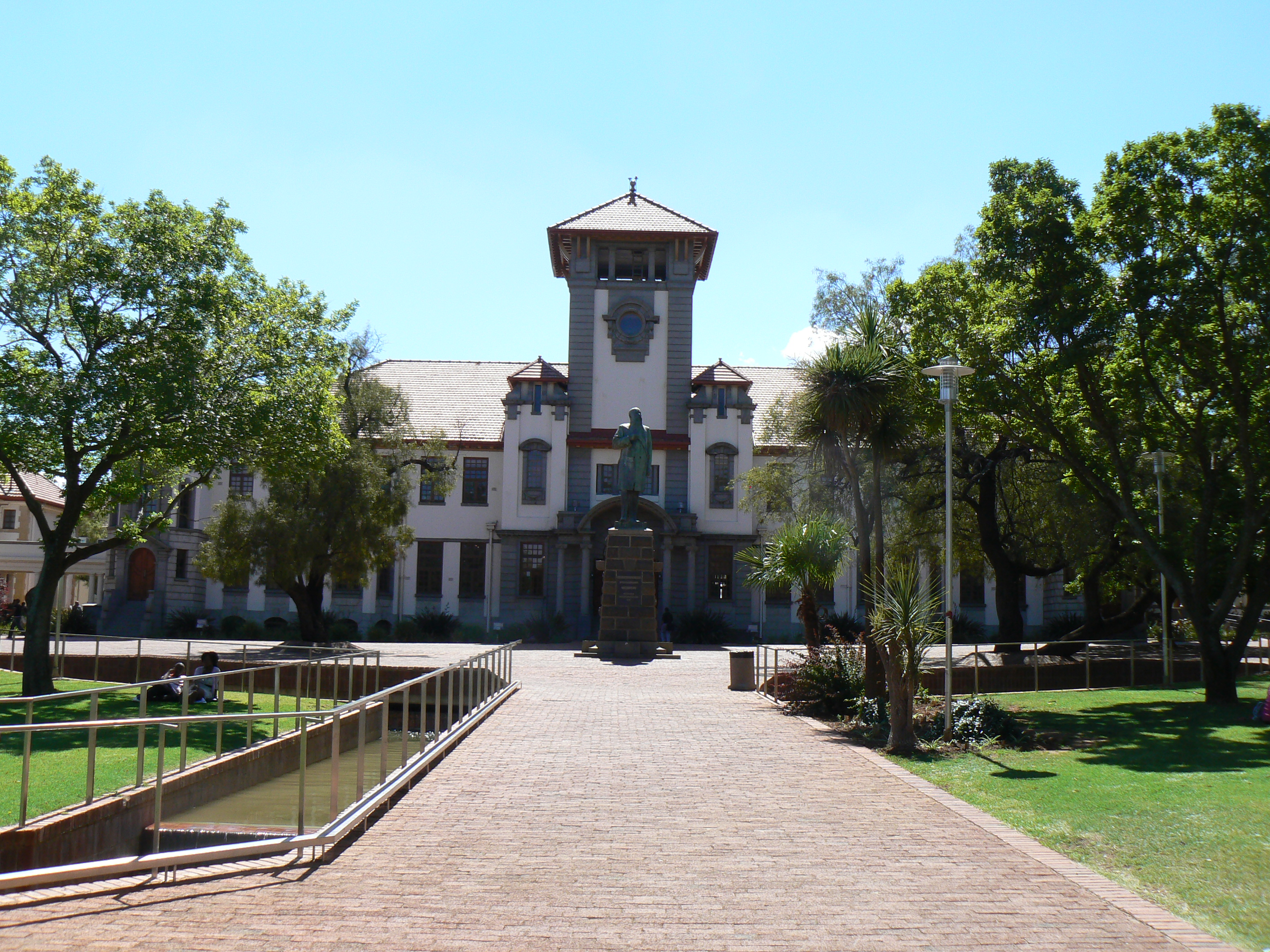
University of the Free State

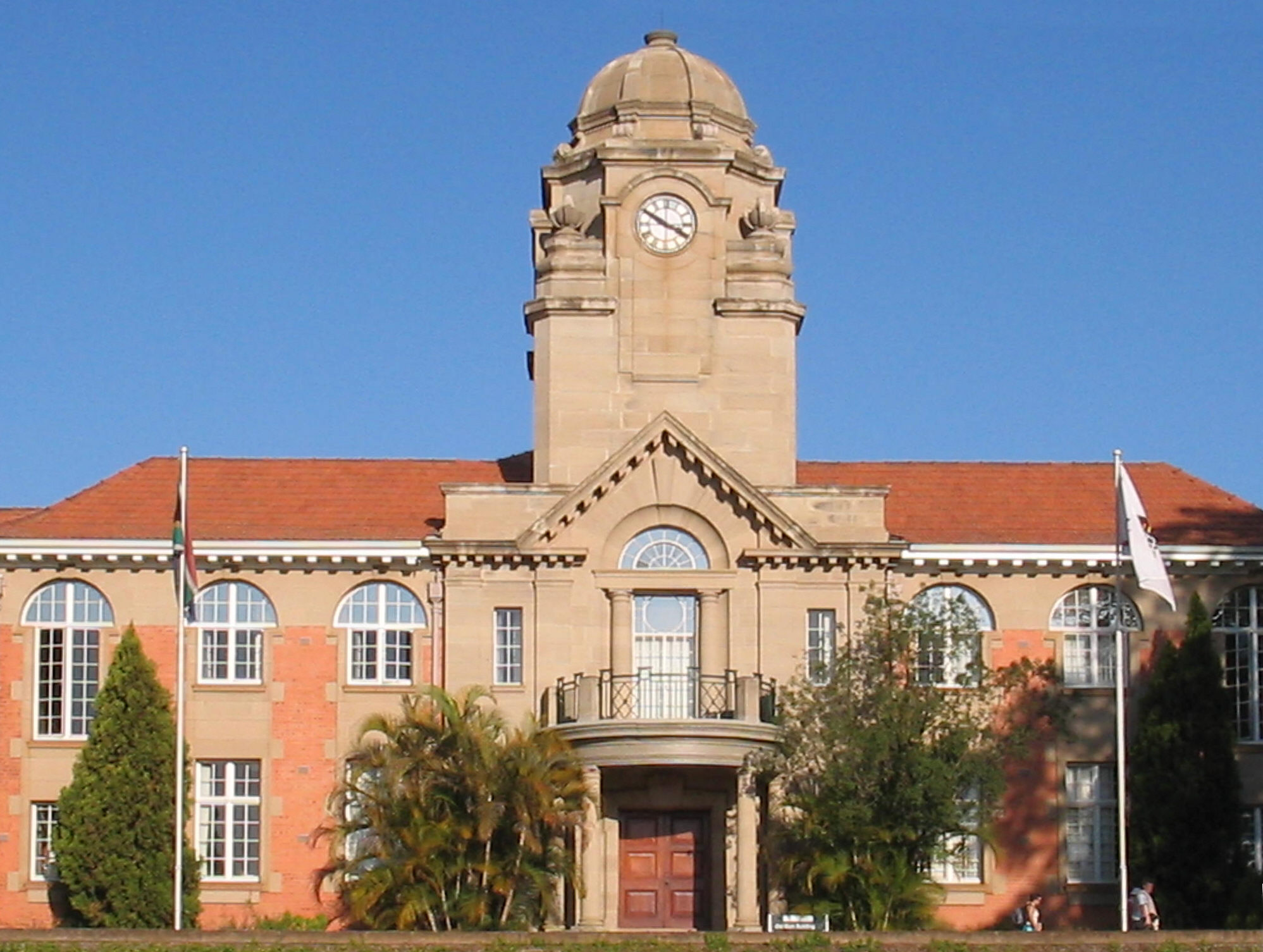
University of KwaZulu-Natal

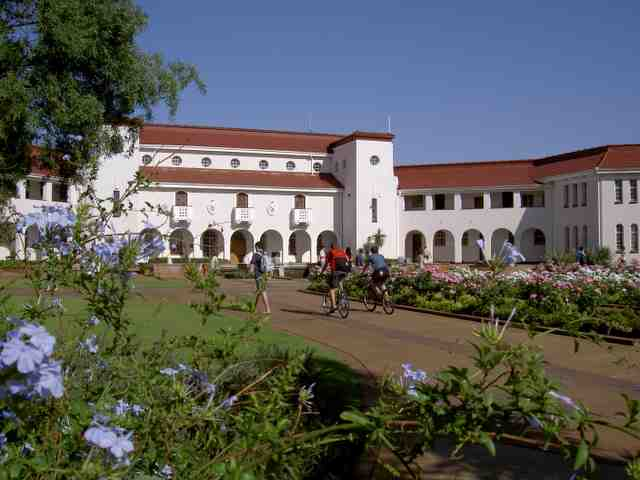
North-West University

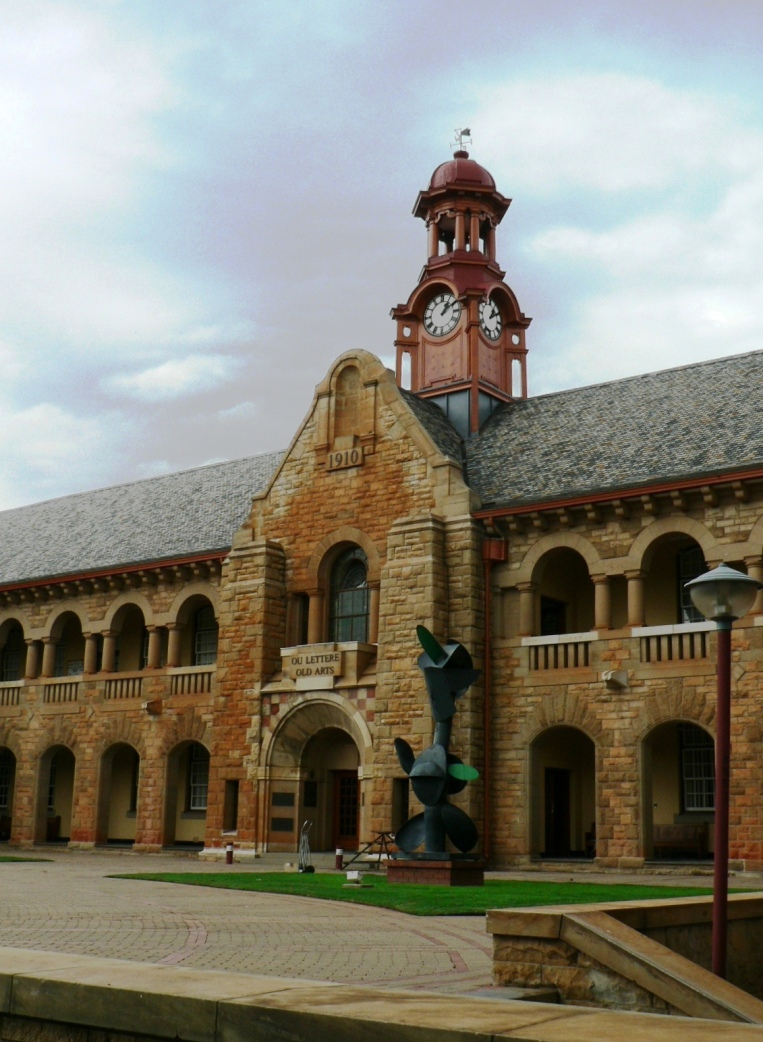
University of Pretoria

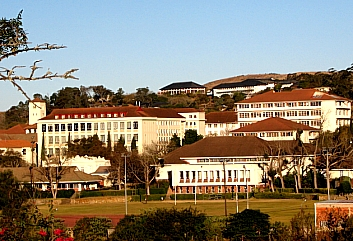
Rhodes University

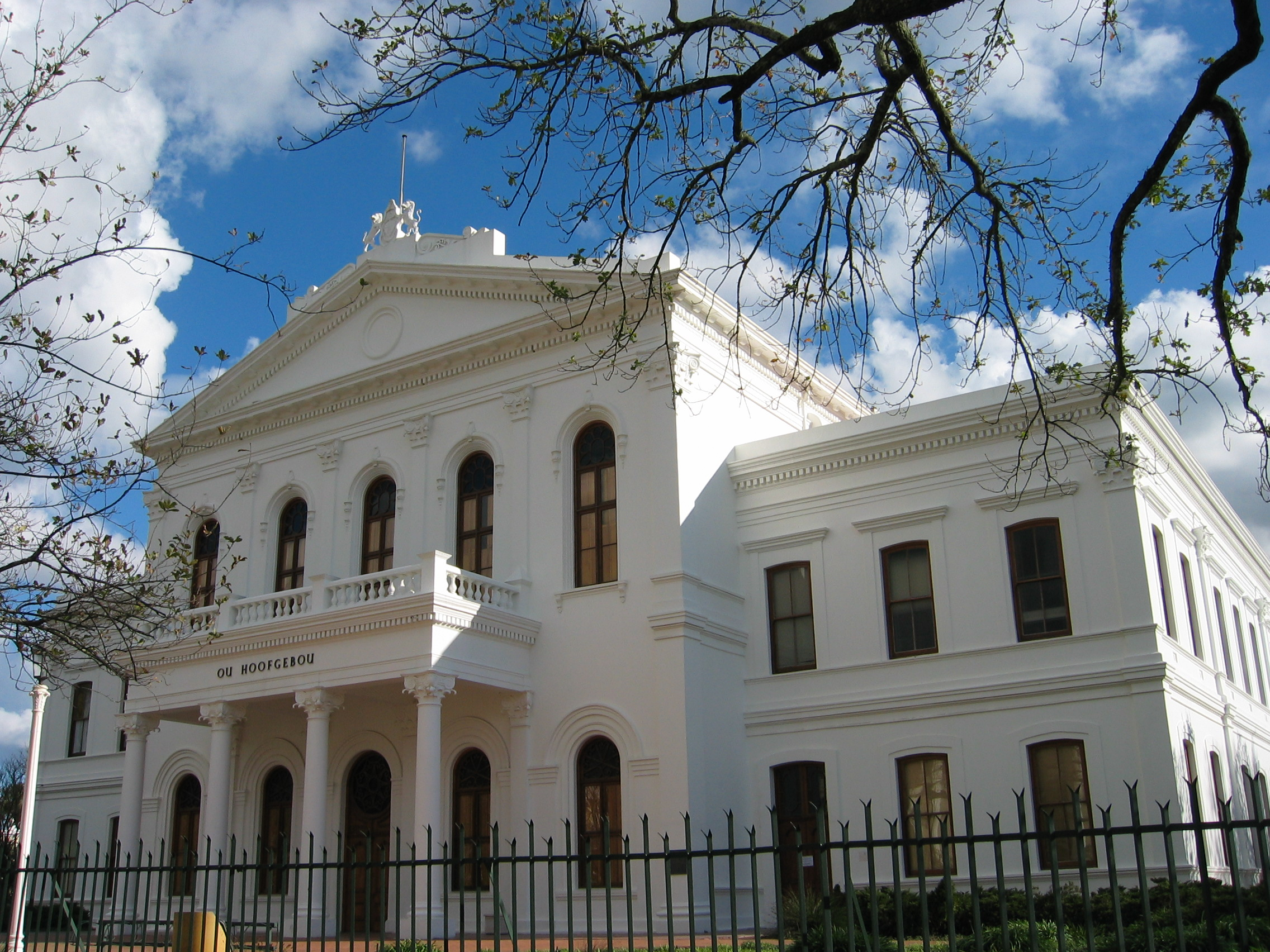
Stellenbosch University

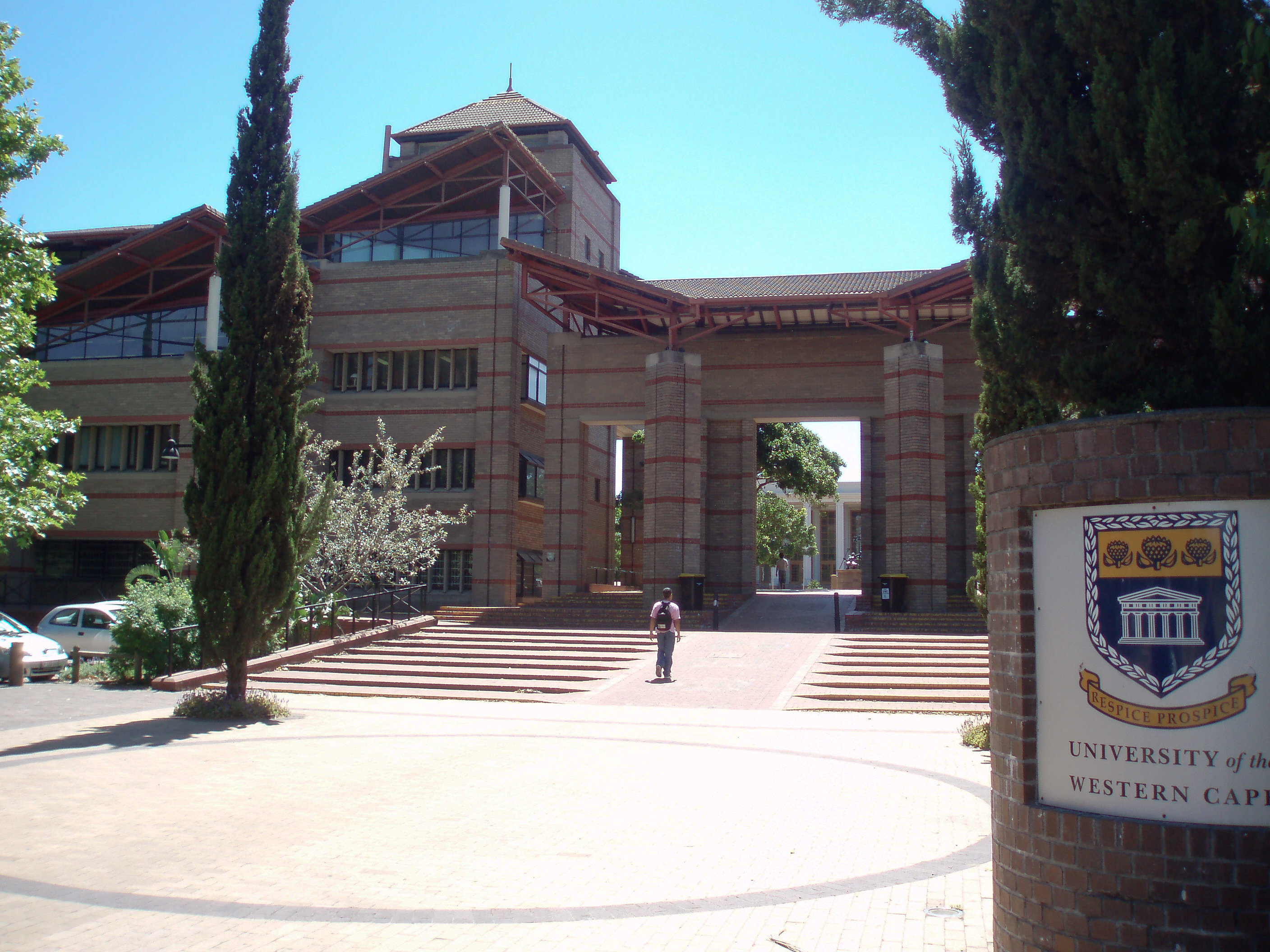
University of the Western Cape

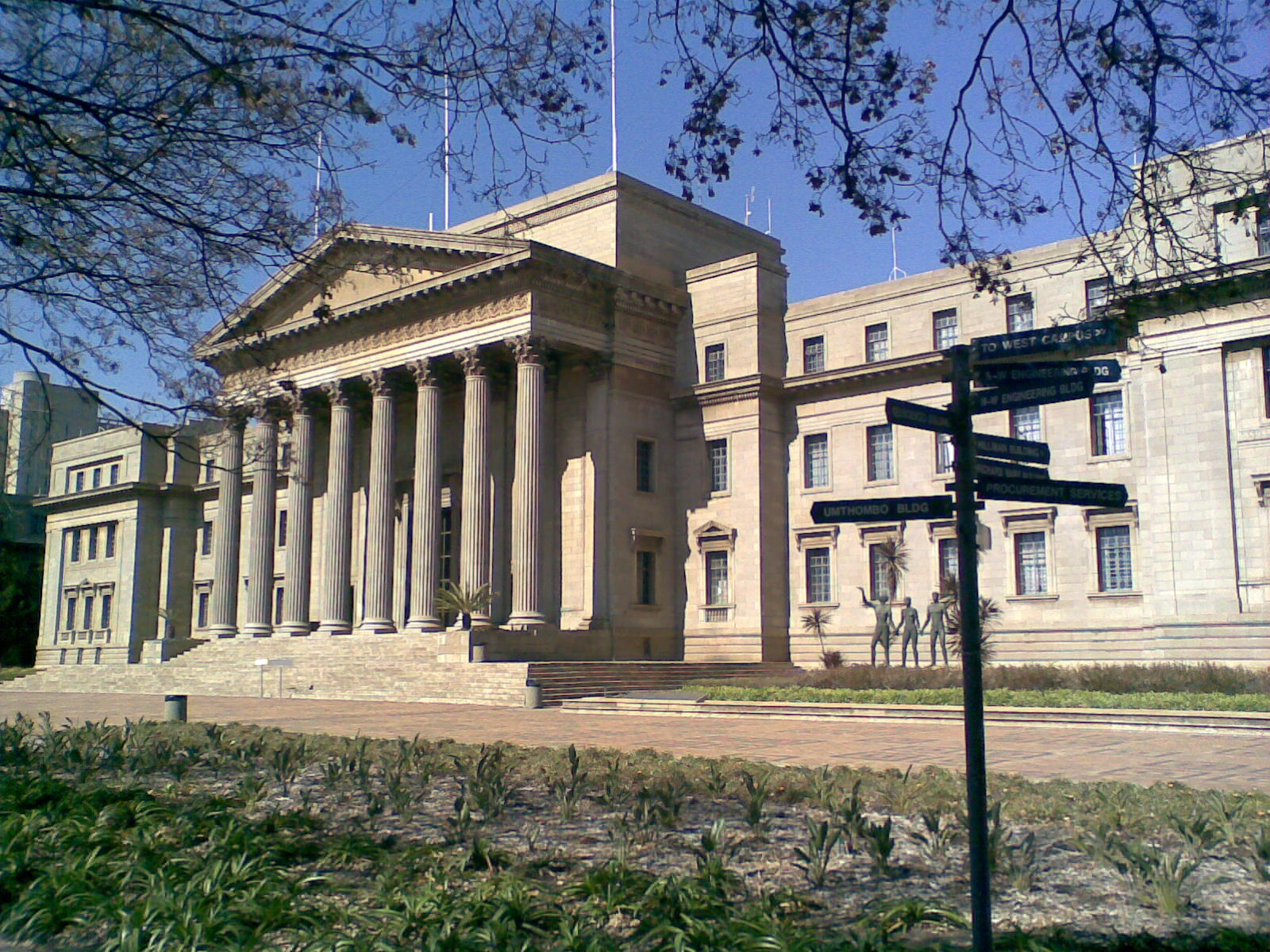
University of the Witwatersrand

Institution	Nickname	Founded	University status	Undergrad	Postgrad	Total	Location(s)	Medium
University of Cape Town	Ikeys / UCT	1 October 1829	2 April 1918	17,685	11,329	29,427 (2024)	Cape Town	Eng
University of Fort Hare	UFH / Blues	1916		9,074	2,000	13,000+ (2025)	Alice, East London, Bhisho	Eng
University of the Free State	Kovsies / UFS	28 January 1904	1950	21,193 (2011)	5,082 (2011)	40,248 (2025)	Bloemfontein, QwaQwa	Eng
University of KwaZulu-Natal	UKZN / Natal / Impi	1 January 2004^{1}	1 January 2004	33,456	13,064	46,000 (2025)	Durban, Pietermaritzburg, Pinetown, Westville	Eng
University of Limpopo	Turfloop	1 January 2005^{1}	1 January 2005	17,273	3,327	20,600	Polokwane, Turfloop	Eng
North-West University	NWU / Pukke / Eagles	1 January 2004^{1}	1 January 2004	50,409	7,245	55,096 (2025)	Mafikeng, Mankwe, Potchefstroom, Vanderbijlpark	Afr (Potchefstroom campus), Eng (Mafikeng campus), Setswana (Vaaldriehoek campus)
University of Pretoria	Tuks / Tukkies / UP	4 March 1908	10 October 1930	35,942^{2}	12,541^{2}	56,453	Pretoria, Johannesburg^{3}	Eng
Rhodes University	Rhodes / RU	31 May 1904	10 March 1951	5,456	1,127	6,700	Grahamstown	Eng
Sefako Makgatho Health Sciences University^{4}	SMU (formerly MEDUNSA)	16 May 2014	16 May 2014			6,410 (2018)	Ga-Rankuwa, Pretoria	Eng
Stellenbosch University	Maties, Stellies	1866	2 April 1918	17,970	9,853	34,000 (2025)	Stellenbosch, Saldanha Bay, Bellville, Tygerberg	Eng, Afr
University of the Western Cape	UWC / Bush / U Dubs	1959	1970	11,836	3,390	15,226	Bellville	Eng
University of the Witwatersrand	Wits, Witsies	1896	1922	25,835	15,867	41,702 (2025)	Johannesburg	Eng

Note^{1}: By merger of existing institutions

Note^{2}: Exact and current numbers not available, these numbers are from the University of Pretoria's wiki.

Note^{3}: The university's business school the Gordon Institute of Business Science has a campus in Illovo and an inner-city campus on Pritchard Street, in downtown Johannesburg.

Note^{4}: Split out from the University of Limpopo into which Medical University of South Africa had previously merged.

=== Comprehensive universities ===
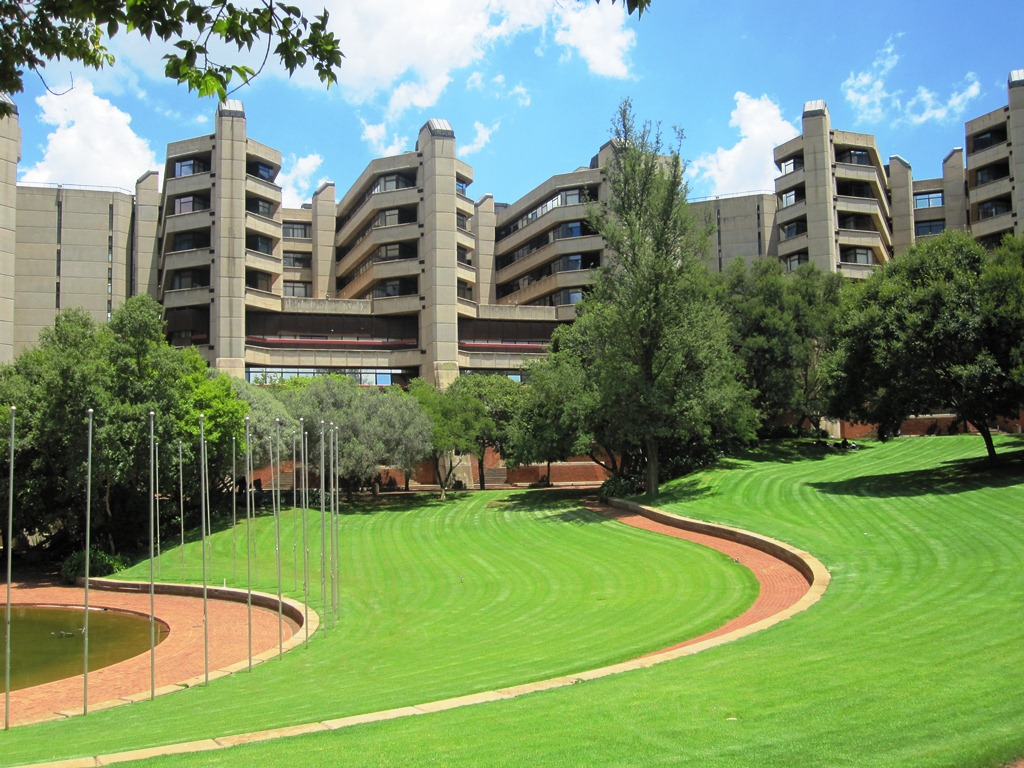
University of Johannesburg

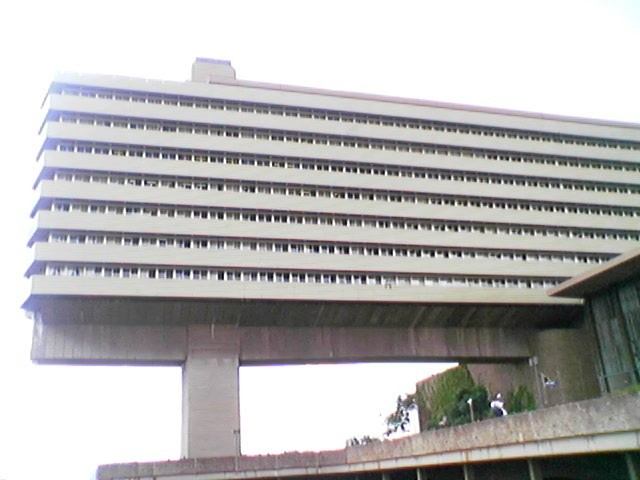
University of South Africa (Unisa)

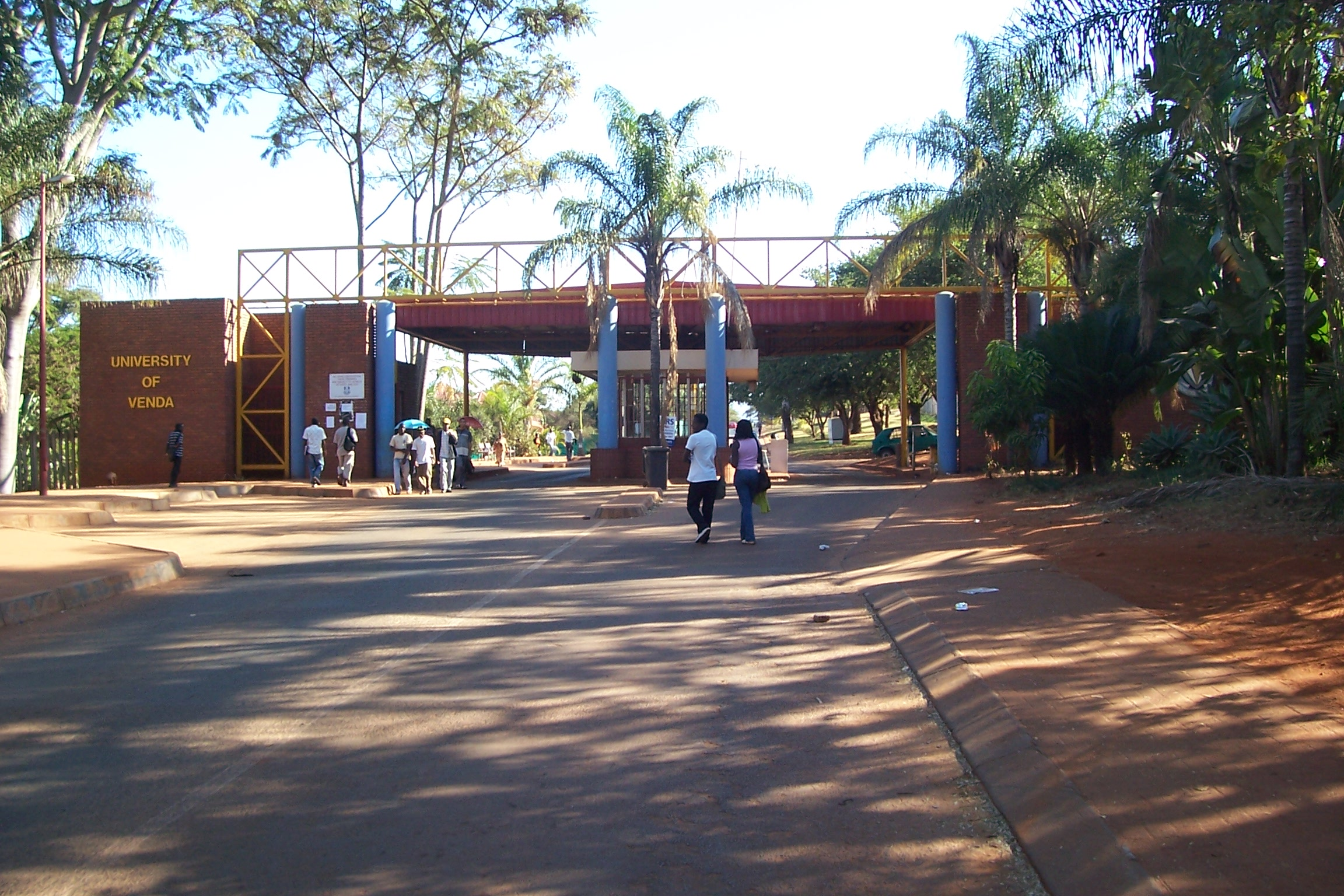
University of Venda

Institution	Nickname	Founded	Undergrad	Postgrad	Total	Location(s)	Medium
University of Johannesburg	UJ	1 January 2005^{1} (1967 as RAU, Technikon Witwatersrand and the East Rand campus of Vista University)	41,229	13,296	54,525 (2025)	Johannesburg, Soweto	Eng
Nelson Mandela University	Madibaz / NMU	1 January 2005^{2} (1964 as UPE)	19,768	2,884	22,652	Gqeberha, George	Eng
University of South Africa	Unisa	1873 (UCGH)			370,000+ (2025)	Distance education, headquartered in Pretoria, campuses and regional offices nationwide	Eng
University of Venda	Univen	1982			10,968	Thohoyandou	Eng
Walter Sisulu University	WSU/ALL BLACKS	1977 (Unitra)			32,081 (2018)	East London, Butterworth, Mthatha, Queenstown	Eng
University of Zululand	UniZulu	1960	6,456	369	6,825	Empangeni	Eng

Note^{1}: By merger of existing institutions
Note^{2}: By merger of existing institutions

=== Universities of technology ===
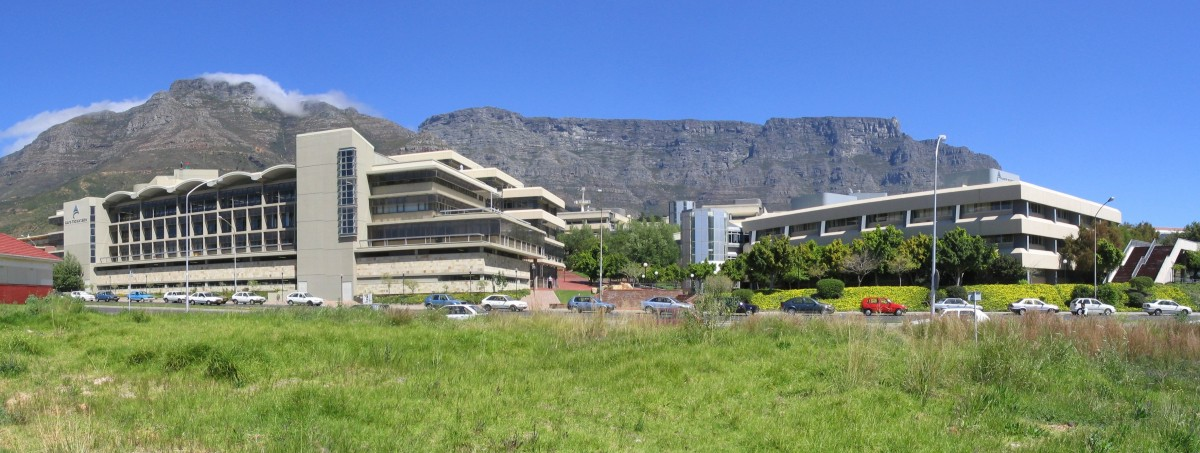
Cape Peninsula University of Technology

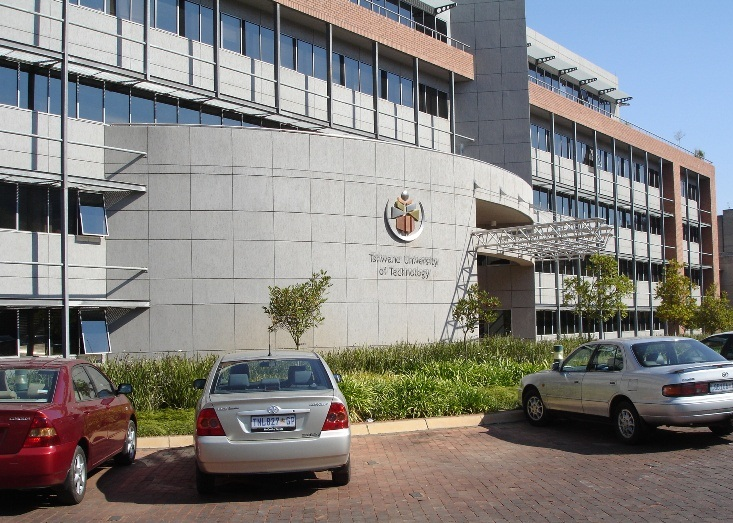
Tshwane University of Technology

Institution	Nickname	Founded	University status	Undergrad	Postgrad	Total	Location(s)	Medium
Cape Peninsula University of Technology	CPUT/Cats	2005^{1}	2005			35,000+ (2026)	Bellville, Cape Town	Eng
Central University of Technology	CUT/Ixias	1981				22,380 (2026)	Bloemfontein, Welkom	Eng
Durban University of Technology	DUT	2002^{1}	2002			23,000	Durban, Pietermaritzburg	Eng
Mangosuthu University of Technology	MUT	1979	2007	14,000	500	14,500 (2025)	Umlazi	Eng
University of Mpumalanga	UMP	2013	2013				Mbombela	Eng
Sol Plaatje University	SPU	2013	2013				Kimberley, Northern Cape	Eng
Tshwane University of Technology	TUT/Vikings	2003^{1}	2003			66,209 (2025)	Pretoria, Mbombela, Polokwane, Ga-Rankuwa, Soshanguve, Witbank	Eng
Vaal University of Technology	VUT	1966	2003			17,000	Vanderbijlpark, Secunda, Kempton Park, Klerksdorp, Upington	Eng

Note^{1}: By merger of existing institutions

== Private degree-granting seminaries, institutes and colleges ==
=== Theological seminaries ===
Institution	Nickname	Founded	Enrollment	Type	Location(s)	Medium
Auckland Park Theological Seminary	ATS	1997 (1956)		Theological seminary	Johannesburg	Eng
Open Christian University	OCU	2021	Rolling Enrollment	Theological	Online	Eng
Baptist Theological College of Southern Africa		1951		Theological seminary	Johannesburg	Eng
George Whitefield College		1989		Theological seminary	Cape Town	Eng
South African Theological Seminary	SATS	1996		Theological seminary	Online	Eng
St Augustine College of South Africa		1999		Private Tertiary Academic Institution	Johannesburg	Eng

=== Institutes ===
Institution	Nickname	Founded	Enrollment	Type	Location(s)	Medium
Two Oceans Graduate Institute	TOGI	2017		Registered private higher education institution	Distance/Online	Eng

== University rankings ==
League tables of South African universities are largely based on international university rankings, because there have not as yet been published any specifically South African rankings.

== University research collaboratives ==
- Cape Higher Education Consortium (CHEC)
- Foundation of Tertiary Institutions of the Northern Metropolis (FOTIM)
- Higher Education South Africa (HESA)
- Southern Education and Research Alliance (SERA)

== Defunct institutions ==
Institution	Location	Founded	Closed	Notes
Bond South Africa	Sandton		2004	Reopened as a new institution. Now Varsity College, part of IIE
Border Technikon	East London		2005	Merged. Now part of Walter Sisulu University for Technology and Science
University of Bophuthatswana	Potchefstroom	2004		Now part of North-West University
University of the Cape of Good Hope	Cape Town	1873	1916	Renamed University of South Africa
Cape Technikon				Now part of Cape Peninsula University of Technology
University of Durban-Westville	Westville	1972	1 January 2004	Now part of University of KwaZulu-Natal
Eastern Cape Technikon	Butterworth	1994	2005	Now part of Walter Sisulu University for Technology and Science
Medical University of South Africa	Ga-Rankuwa	1976	1 January 2005	Now part of University of Limpopo
Technikon Natal	Durban			Now part of Durban University of Technology
University of the North	Polokwane	1959	1 January 2005	Now part of University of Limpopo
University of Natal	Pietermaritzburg, Durban	1910	1 January 2004	Now part of University of KwaZulu-Natal
University of North-West, formerly the University of Bophuthatswana	Mafikeng		1 January 2004	Now part of North-West University
Port Elizabeth Technikon.	Port Elizabeth, George	1882	2005	Now part of Nelson Mandela University
University of Port Elizabeth	Port Elizabeth	31 January 1964	2005	Now part of Nelson Mandela University
Potchefstroom University for Christian Higher Education	Potchefstroom	29 November 1869	1 January 2004	Now part of North-West University
Rand Afrikaans University	Johannesburg	1967	2005	Now part of University of Johannesburg
Technikon SA			1 January 2004	Now part of University of South Africa
Transvaal University College	Johannesburg, Pretoria	1906	1910/1930	Predecessor of the University of Pretoria and the University of the Witwatersrand. The University of the Witwatersrand was named the Transvaal University College from 1906 to 1910. The University of Pretoria was established as the Pretoria branch of the Transvaal University College in 1908 and retained that name until 1930.
University of Transkei	Transkei	1977	2005	Now part of Walter Sisulu University for Technology and Science
University of Gazankulu	Giyani	?	?	Probably distributed between the University of Venda and the University of Limpopo
Vista University	Multi-city campus university	1981	2004/2005	Now merged with the Nelson Mandela University, the University of the Free State, the University of Johannesburg, the University of Pretoria, the University of South Africa and the Vaal University of Technology.
Technikon Witwatersrand	Johannesburg	1925	2005	University of Johannesburg

== See also ==
- Ranking of South African universities
- List of colleges and universities by country
- List of post secondary institutions in South Africa
- List of South African universities by endowment
- List of South African university chancellors and vice-chancellors
- List of medical schools in South Africa
- List of law schools in South Africa
- List of business schools in South Africa
- List of architecture schools in South Africa
- Open access in South Africa
- Higher Education South Africa
- Academic boycotts of South Africa (historical Apartheid-era)
