= List of business schools in South Africa =

Location of South Africa

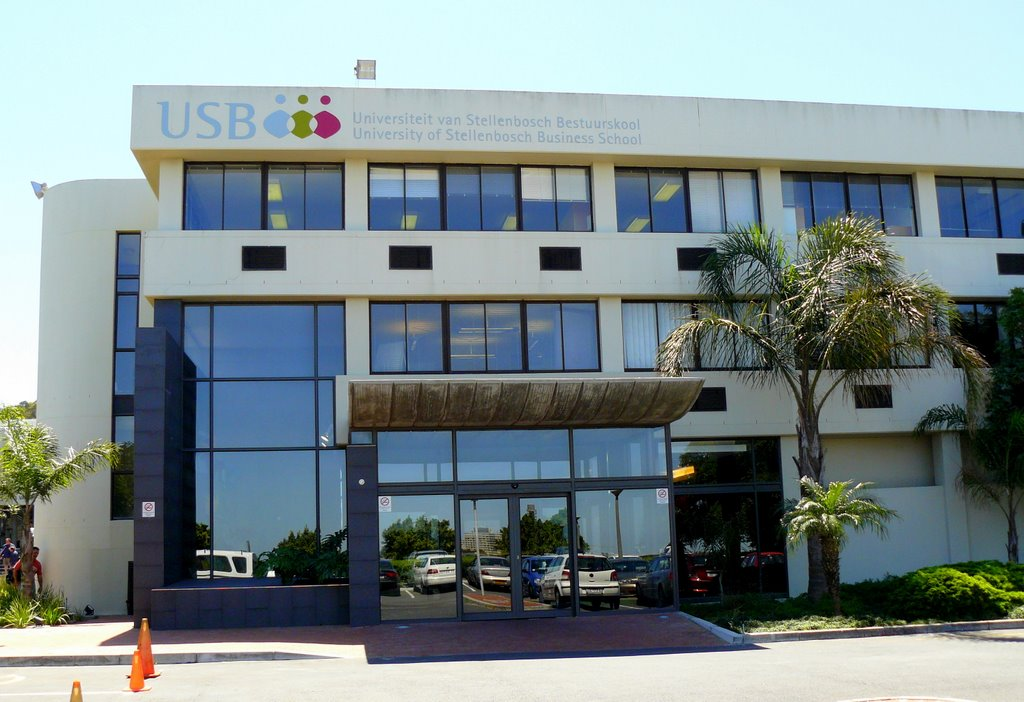
USB main building entrance

This is a list of business schools in South Africa. For the purposes of this list business schools are defined as accredited, degree-granting, postsecondary institutions. Institutions are accredited in South Africa by the Council on Higher Education (CHE), whilst institutions also pursue international accreditation from AMBA, EQUIS and AACSB.

Founded in 1949, the University of Pretoria's now defunct Graduate School of Management was the first business school in South Africa and was the first MBA programme to be launched outside of North America, whilst the University of Cape Town Graduate School of Business and University of Stellenbosch Business School, founded in 1964, are the oldest business schools in continuous operation. Founded in 2005, the Nelson Mandela University Business School is the newest business school in South Africa. SHS Institute of Hospitality Management was established in 1995 and provides programmes such as Bachelor of Hospitality Management

== Business schools ==
Business School	Institution	City	Accreditation	Year founded
Henley Business School South Africa	Henley Business School	Johannesburg	CHE, AMBA (MBA), EQUIS, AACSB	1992
The Business School of South Africa		Centurion	Full SETA Accreditation	2005
SA Business School		Johannesburg	CHE	2015
Regent Business School		Johannesburg	CHE	1999
CIDA City Campus		Johannesburg	Closed / Deregistered	2000
Gordon Institute of Business Science (GIBS)	University of Pretoria	Johannesburg^{1}	CHE, AMBA (MBA & DBA), AACSB	2000^{2}
Graduate School of Business	University of KwaZulu-Natal	Durban	CHE	1974
Management College of Southern Africa		Durban	CHE	1995
Milpark Business School		Johannesburg	CHE	1997
Nelson Mandela University Business School	Nelson Mandela University	Port Elizabeth	CHE	2005
Graduate School of Business and Government Leadership	North-West University	Mafikeng	CHE	2000
NWU Business School	North-West University	Potchefstroom	CHE	1998
Regenesys Business School		Johannesburg	CHE	1999
Regent Business School		Johannesburg	CHE	
Rhodes Business School (RBS)	Rhodes University	Grahamstown	CHE, AMBA (MBA) (in process)	2000
Southern Business School		Johannesburg	CHE	1996
South African College of Business (SACOB)		Cape Town	Umalusi (in process), CHE (in process)	2011
School of Business Leadership (SBL)	University of South Africa	Midrand	CHE	1965
The Business School at Varsity College	The Independent Institute of Education	Multiple campuses	CHE	1991
Tshwane University of Technology Business School	Tshwane University of Technology	Pretoria	CHE	1999
Turfloop Graduate School of Leadership	University of Limpopo	Polokwane	CHE	1997
UCT Graduate School of Business (GSB)	University of Cape Town	Cape Town	CHE, AMBA (MBA), EQUIS, AACSB	1964
University of Stellenbosch Business School (USB)	Stellenbosch University	Bellville	CHE, AMBA (MBA), EQUIS, AACSB	1964
University of the Free State Business School	University of the Free State	Bloemfontein	CHE	1999
Johannesburg Business School (JBS)	University of Johannesburg (UJ)	Johannesburg	CHE	1919
SHS - Institute of Hospitality Maanagement	The Swiss Hotel School (SHS)	Johannesburg	CHE	1995
SHS - Institute of Culinary Arts	The Swiss Hotel School (SHS)	Johannesburg	QCTO	1995
Wits Business School (WBS)	University of the Witwatersrand	Johannesburg	CHE, AMBA (MBA)	1968
DUT Business School	Durban University of Technology	Durban	CHE	2021

^{1} GIBS offers company specific programmes in London, United Kingdom

^{2} Note as of January 2008 GIBS replaced the Graduate School of Management

=== Rankings ===
League tables of South African business schools are largely based on international business schools rankings, because specifically South African rankings have not as yet been published.

=== Business school alliances ===
- South African Business Schools Association (SABSA)

== See also ==
- List of universities in South Africa
- Ranking of South African universities
- List of colleges and universities by country
- List of colleges and universities
- List of post secondary institutions in South Africa
- List of South African university chancellors and vice-chancellors
- List of medical schools in South Africa
- List of law schools in South Africa
- List of architecture schools in South Africa
- Higher Education South Africa
- Academic boycotts of South Africa (historical Apartheid-era)
