= South African Technology Network =

Coalition of five Technology universities for among others, collaboration and support

The South African Technology Network is a coalition between five of the South African Universities of Technology. Also known as SATN, the network was founded in 2005 and launched at their 2008 national conference. Established with the main goal of providing for a network to ensure the continuation of the process of cooperation, collaboration, support and joint activities such as joint curriculum development, applied research, quality assurance, cooperative education etc. within the Universities of Technology (UoTs) in the Republic of South Africa.

== Members ==
University	Location	University Status	Homepage
Cape Peninsula University of Technology (CPUT)	Cape Town, Western Cape	2005	Website
Central University of Technology (CUT)	Bloemfontein, Free State	2004	Website
Durban University of Technology (DUT)	Durban, KwaZulu-Natal	2006	Website
Tshwane University of Technology (TUT)	Pretoria, Gauteng	2004	Website
Vaal University of Technology (VUT)	Vanderbijlpark, Gauteng	2004	Website

== SATN Trust ==
The SATN Trust was registered in August 2008 as an initiative of the vice-chancellors of the South African Universities of Technology (UoTs). It was established in order to present the views of UoTs at a national and international level, and to develop national education and training policies in accordance of the nature and character of UoTs. As well as promoting relevant research, academic excellence and employability of students. The trust will also promote co-operation between UoTs and commerce and industry.

The trustees of the SATN include the vice-chancellors of the five Universities of Technology, one member from the Department of Education, the CEO of Higher Education South Africa, and the CEO of the Tshumisano Trust.
