= Baptist Union of Southern Africa =

Christian denomination

- Abbreviation: BUSA
- Classification: Evangelical Christianity
- Theology: Baptist
- Associations: Baptist World Alliance, Evangelical Alliance of South Africa
- Headquarters: Roodepoort, South Africa
- Origin: 1877
- Congregations: 537
- Members: 36,591
- Missionary organization: Missions Board
- Aid organization: Deed of Love Ministry
- Seminaries: 2
- Official website: baptistunion.org.za

The Baptist Union of Southern Africa is a Baptist Christian denomination in South Africa. It is affiliated with the Baptist World Alliance and the Evangelical Alliance of South Africa. The headquarters is in Roodepoort in Gauteng province.

== History ==
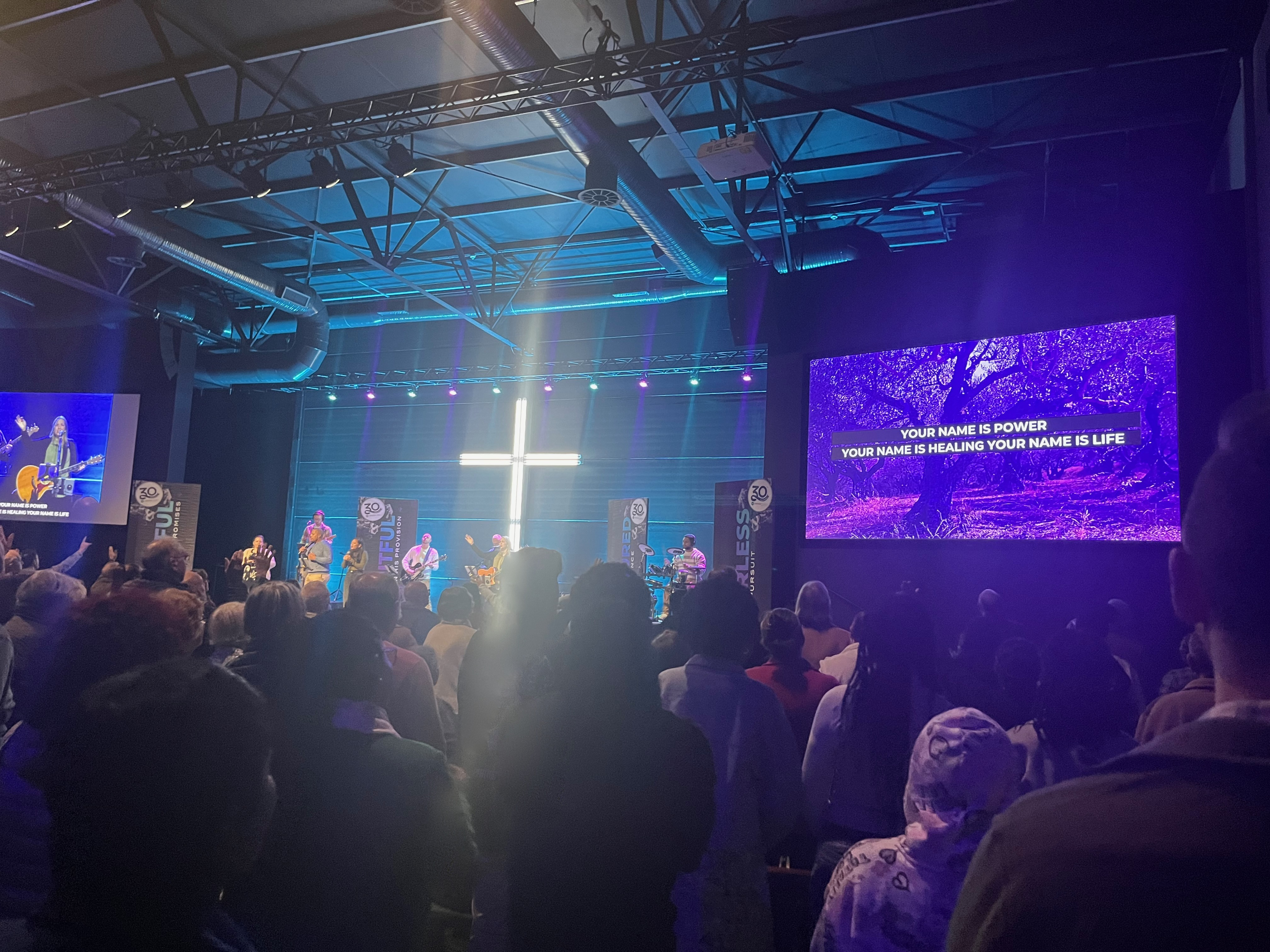
Worship service at Linkway Church in Cape Town.

The Baptist Union of Southern Africa has its origins in the first Baptist churches in Salem, Eastern Cape and in Grahamstown founded in 1823 by William Miller, an English Baptist pastor. The first ordained Baptist preacher to travel to South Africa was William Davies, who was sent by the Baptist Missionary Society in England. He arrived in 1832 and ministered in Grahamstown for a short period. Work in Kariega, about 16 miles from Grahamstown, began in 1834. A German settlement around 1860 brought the first German Baptist work led by Carsten Langheim. A German pastor, Carl H. Gutsche, baptized J. D. Odendall, who founded the first Dutch-speaking Baptist church in South Africa in 1886. The Baptist Union was founded in 1877 by four English-speaking churches and one German-speaking church. The South African Baptist Missionary Society was formed in 1892. Black Baptist churches united to form the Bantu Baptist Church in 1927, under the auspices of the South African Baptist Missionary Society.

According to a census published by the association in 2023, it claimed 537 churches and 36,591 members.

== Schools ==
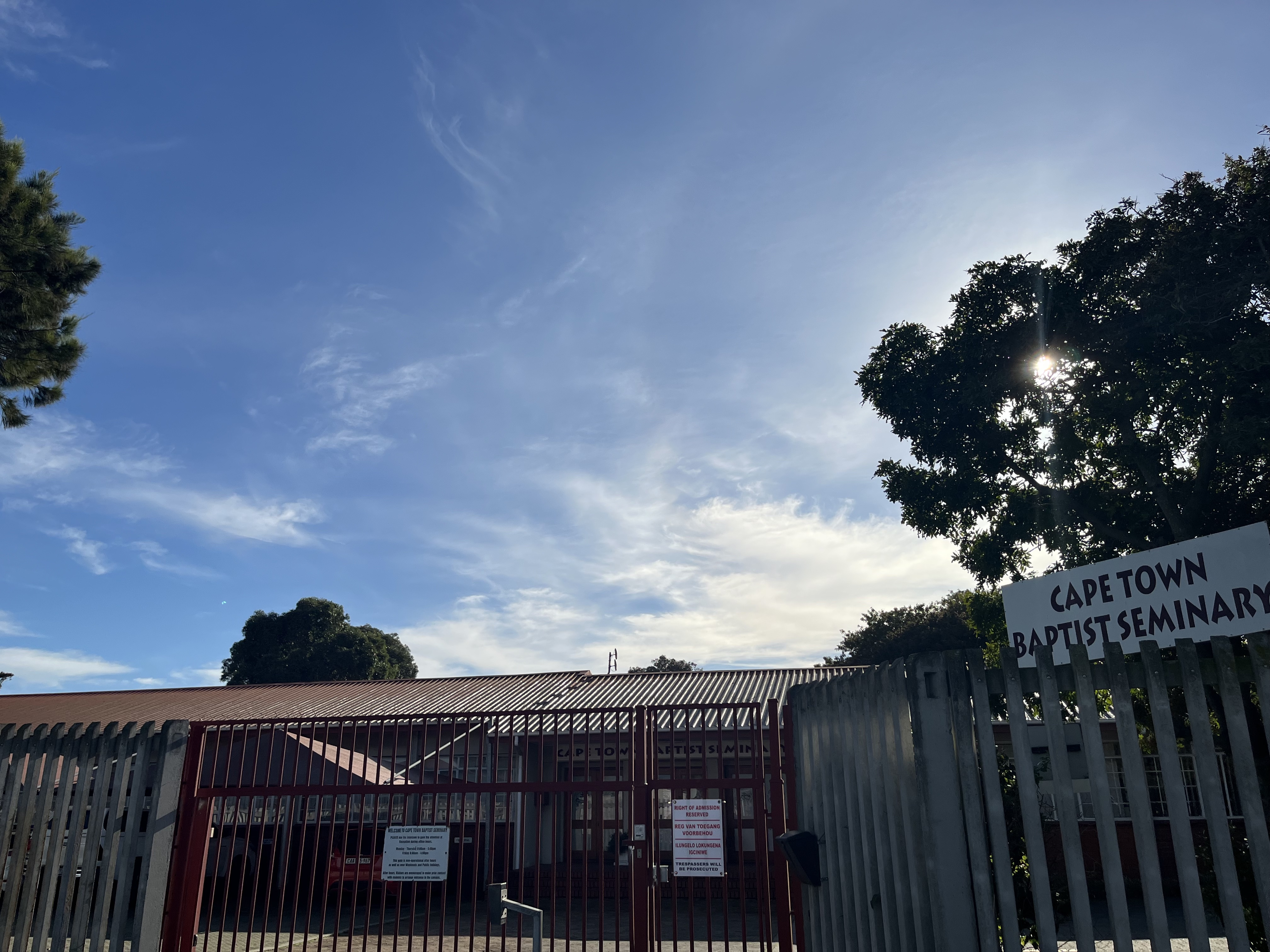
Cape Town Baptist Seminary.

In 1951, the Baptist Union establishes the Baptist Theological College of Southern Africa in Randburg and the Cape Town Baptist Seminary in 1974 in Cape Town.

== Missionary Organization ==
The Convention has a missionary organization, Missions Board.

== Humanitarian organization ==
It has a humanitarian organization, Deed of Love Ministry.

== Associations ==
The Baptist Union of Southern Africa comprises a number of associations and networks. Each association or network is made up of a number of autonomous local churches which prescribe to Christian tenets of belief and Baptist distinctives and hold voluntary membership with an association.

- Baptist Northern Association
- Western Province Baptist Network
- Baptist Association of the Northern Cape
- Border Baptist Network
- Eastern Province Baptist Network
- Free State Baptist Network
- Kwa-Zulu Natal Baptist Association

== See also ==
- Bible
- Born again
- Baptist beliefs
- Jesus Christ
- Believers' Church
