= SABSA =

SABSA may refer to:

- Saudi Arabian Boy Scouts Association
- Sherwood Applied Business Security Architecture, a framework and methodology for enterprise security and risk management
- South African Business Schools Association
