= Gauteng and Environs Library Consortium =

Cooperative regional academic library network

- Abbreviation: GAELIC
- Formation: April 1996
- Purpose: Education, research, lifelong learning
- Headquarters: 1 Jan Smuts Avenue, Braamfontein 2000, Johannesburg, Gauteng, South Africa
- Coordinates: 26.189771°S 28.031677°E
- Region served: South Africa
- Official language: English
- Parent organization: Foundation of Tertiary Institutions of the Northern Metropolis

Gauteng and Environs Library Consortium (GAELIC) was the first project of FOTIM (Foundation of Tertiary Institutions of the Northern Metropolis) in South Africa. GAELIC was founded in April 1996. Its mission was to use and develop the information resources in the Gauteng, Limpopo, and North West province of South Africa in order to promote education, research and lifelong learning. Due to consolidation of projects and duplication, FOTIM and GAELIC closed down in July 2011.

== Members ==
- University of Johannesburg
- University of Limpopo
- North-West University
- University of Pretoria
- University of South Africa
- Tshwane University of Technology
- Vaal University of Technology
- University of Venda
- University of the Witwatersrand

== See also ==
- List of library consortia in South Africa
- Foundation of Tertiary Institutions of the Northern Metropolis
