= Sadullah Khan =

Islamic studies academic

Sadullah Khan, originally from South Africa, born in Vryburg, was a student leader active in the anti-apartheid struggle. Sheikh Khan has been a public speaker since the age of 12, a public reciter of Quran since age 6, a chanter of melodious odes in praise of the Prophet since 8, and an experienced teacher at colleges and universities in South Africa and the United States; Khan completed studies in law at University of Durban, South Africa, Journalism (UK) and Islamic Studies at Al - Azhar University in Cairo, Egypt.

Khan co-founded the Islamic College of Southern Africa (now International Peace University of South Africa) where he also headed the Quranic Sciences Department from 1990 to 1998. He formerly wrote the column Ask the Imam for Beliefnet.com, and lectured on Islamic Civilization at California State University, Dominguez Hills, where he also presented a thirteen-week three-hour weekly live TV program from CSUDH on Islamic Civilization & Culture. As a motivational speaker he addresses issues of theology, spirituality, empowerment and youth development. He is the author of the book Dimensions of the Qur'an. Khan has had several roles:

- Director of Muslim Affairs at the University of Southern California
- Lecturer on Islam for the Academy of Judaic, Christian and Islamic Studies at the University of California, Los Angeles
- Advisor for the development of the post-graduate Islamic Studies program at Claremont Graduate University
- Advisor to the Chancellor's Committee on Religion Ethics and Values at UCLA
- Presenter of weekly Wise Living TV show titled "From the Streets of LA to the Hearts of the World"

He is the CEO of Islamia College, in Cape Town, South Africa.
