= Central Johannesburg College =

College in Johannesburg, South Africa

Coordinates: 26.113809°S 28.102866°E

Central Johannesburg College (CJC) is a South African college found in September 2001, with the official declaration Technical Colleges into Further Education and Training Colleges made by the Minister of Education, Kader Asmal. His declaration followed a national strategy to restructure the educational landscape of South Africa and provide improved access to a more diverse student population. It is the ultimate aim to create a Further Education and Training (FET) sector that will directly affect the transformation of society in terms of relevant education that will uplift the economy through active entrepreneurial training and the preparation of students for the world of work.

== See also ==
- Rankings of universities in South Africa
