= Durbanville College =

College in South Africa

- Motto: Carpe diem (Seize the day)
- Type: Institution for Higher Education
- Active: 1992–2022
- Academic affiliations: University of South Africa
- Chancellor: PG Smit
- Location: Durbanville, Western Cape, South Africa; 33.8340°S 18.6476°E
- Website: www.durbanvillecollege.ac.za

Durbanville College was an institution for higher education and registered under South African law. It was situated in Durbanville, South Africa and affiliated with the University of South Africa. It was a private institution. The college closed down in January 2022.

== Campus ==
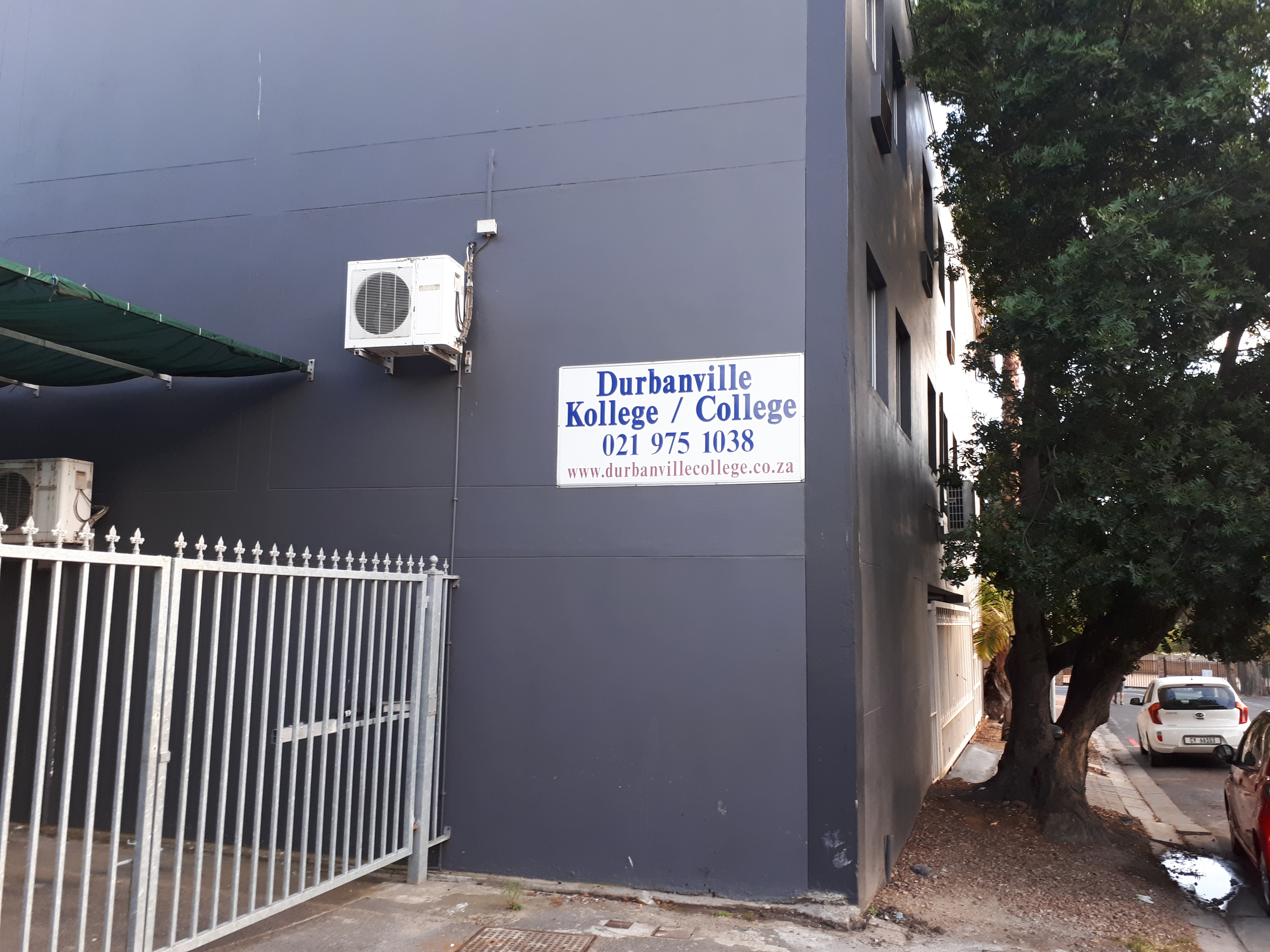
Durbanville College Main Building

Only one campus existed in Durbanville.

== Academics ==
The lecturers taught students in a classroom environment, towards a degree that awarded by the University of South Africa. Courses offered by the University of South Africa was normally by way of correspondence. The college had an agreement with the University of South Africa; students had to apply at the University of South Africa and comply with the requirements they set for the specific qualification admission. The degree or diploma was therefore awarded by the University of South Africa at their graduation ceremony. The college only offered undergraduate courses in:

- Bachelor of Education
- Bachelor of Commerce
- Other certificates and short course

== Language medium ==
The courses were conducted in English and Afrikaans.

== Research ==
Postgraduate studies were not offered, and no formal research was conducted. The college had an undertaking with Durbanville library to assist with undergraduate research.

== Student life ==
The motto was Carpe Diem, Latin for "Seize the day". A annually elected student body organized activities for students.

== Principals ==
Since they bought the college from the original founders, the du Plooy family in 1996, DM Laas and PG Smit were the principals responsible for the college. They fulfilled the roles of chancellor and administrator respectively.
