= Latitude Varsity =

- Location: Bellville, Western Cape, South Africa
- Website: http://www.latitudevarsity.com/

Latitude Varsity is a small university located in Bellville, South Africa. It specializes in computer science, business education, and finance.
