= Regenesys Business School =

Organization in Johannesburg, South Africa

Coordinates: 26°6′39″S 28°3′21″E

Regenesys
- Motto: Awakening Potential
- Type: Private university
- Established: 1998
- Founders: Dr Marko Saravanja, Dr Penny Law, Mr William Vivian
- Affiliations: South African Business Schools Association
- Chairperson: Dr Marko Saravanja
- Dean: Dr Sibongiseni Kumalo
- Academic staff: 90
- Administrative staff: 342
- Students: 200,000+
- Location: Mumbai, India; Sandton, South Africa; Lagos, Nigeria; Nairobi, Kenya;, South Africa, India, Nigeria, Kenya, United States of America
- Campus: Multiple Sites
- Colors: Gold
- Website: www.regenesys.net

Regenesys is a private college based in Johannesburg, South Africa. The Regenesys Group includes Regenesys Business School, Regenesys School of Public Management, Regenesys School of Law, and School of Technology. The group has campuses and offices online and in South Africa, Mumbai, Nairobi, and Lagos.

== Academic Programmes ==
Regenesys has a focus on business management, public management, and law. Its accredited programmes include:

POSTGRADUATE

- Doctor of Business Management
- Master of Business Administration
- Master of Public Management
- Postgraduate Diploma in Business Management
- Postgraduate Diploma in Public Management

UNDERGRADUATE

- Bachelor of Laws (LLB) (introduced 2023)
- Bachelor of Accounting Science (BCompt)
- Bachelor of Business Administration
- Bachelor of Business Administration in Banking
- Bachelor of Business Administration in Retail Management
- Bachelor of Public Management
- Bachelor of Science in Computer Science
- Higher Certificate in Business Management
- Higher Certificate in Business Management in Credit Banking
- Higher Certificate in Business Management in Retail Management
- Higher Certificate in Public Management

== Corporate Education Programmes ==
Regenesys Corporate Education offers a wide range of open-enrolment and customised corporate education programmes for senior, middle and junior managers in business, government, non-profit, and state-owned enterprises. Programmes include:

- Executive Development Programmes
- Management Development Programmes
- Online Short Learning Programmes
- Skills Programmes
- Learnerships

== Accreditation ==
Regenesys is accredited by the Council for Higher Education in South Africa. It is also registered with the Department of Higher Education and Training. South African higher education institutions are accredited through the Council for Higher Education in South Africa and Regenesys is accredited to offer its programmes in accordance with the national quality standards.

== Ranking ==
Regenesys is ranked as one of the top 50 business schools in South Africa. The school was given a ranking from the 2022 PMR.Africa rating. The ratings are based on respondents who rate MBA/MBL graduates and students on a variety of attributes or criteria, including: application of knowledge in the workplace, emotional intelligence, entrepreneurial skills, financial management, innovation, leadership qualities and strategic management. The survey was conducted among human resource managers, directors and line managers from corporate companies, national, provincial and local government departments, municipalities and state-owned enterprises.

== Advisory Boards ==
The Regenesys advisory board is a body that provides non-binding strategic advice to the management of the Regenesys group. The advisory council consists of 15 boards.

== Holistic Approach to Education ==
A holistic approach is practiced because the co-founder of Regenesys, Dr Saravanja, was a monk.
