= Salem, South Africa =

Salem
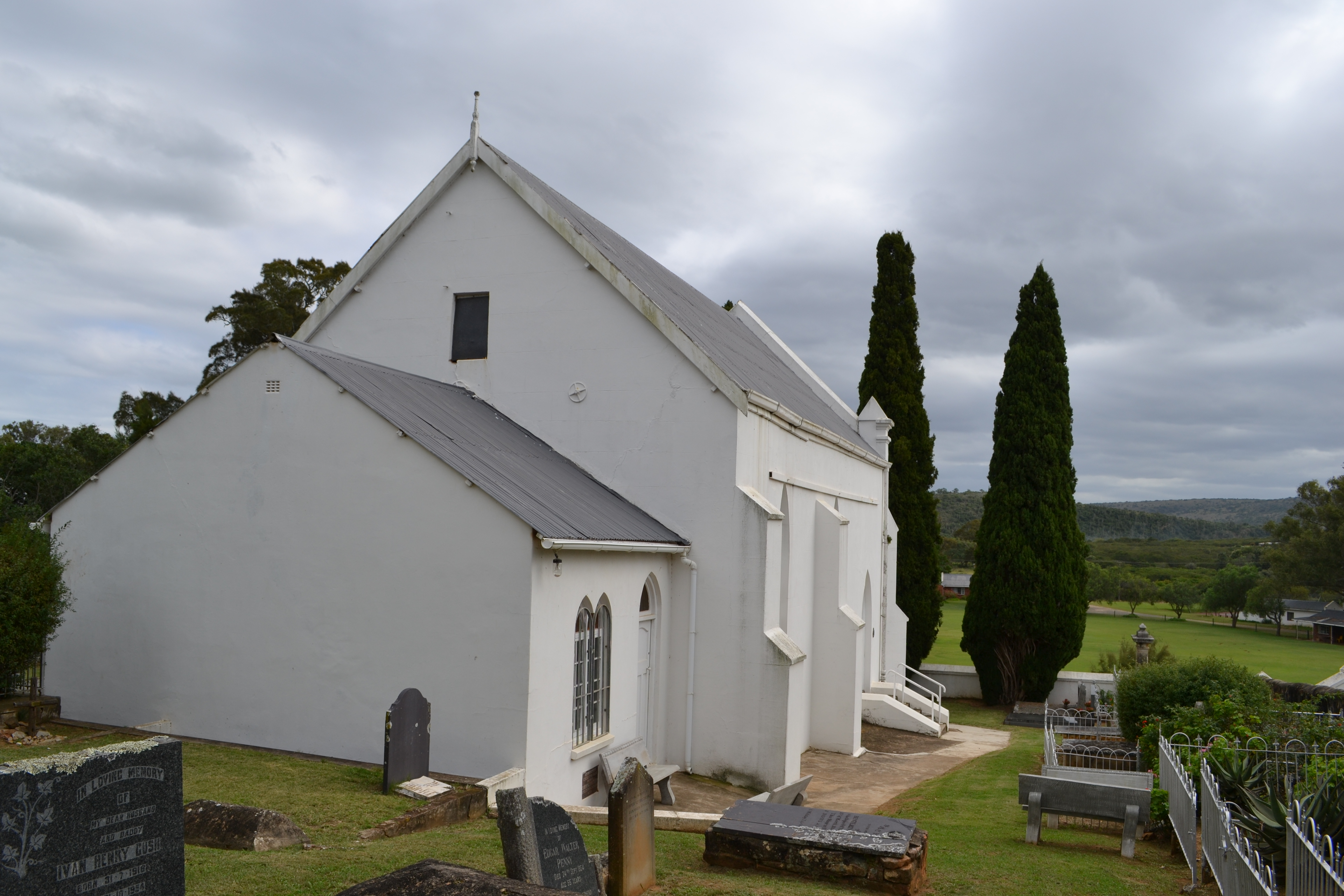
- 1820 Methodist Church in Salem

- Location within Eastern Cape Location within South Africa
- Coordinates: 33°28′17″S 26°29′00″E
- Country: South Africa
- Province: Eastern Cape
- District: Sarah Baartman
- Municipality: Makana
- Time zone: UTC+2 (SAST)
- PO box: 6150

Salem is a settlement in South Africa, about 20 kilometres (12 mi) south of Grahamstown and 20 kilometres (12 mi) north of Alexandria. It was founded as a settlement of the Hezekiah Sephton party of 1820 Settlers comprising the following families and individuals: Jones, John Filmer, Aadam Proctor, Wm. Muir, Urry, Watkins, Mika Williams, Colling, Booth, Rees, Talbot, Bryant, Wm. Penny, Oats, Prior, Timlett, Rayner, Prinn, Istead, Jenkinson, Cyrus, Wells, Marsh, Serle, Sparks, C. Penny, Witherage, Gush, Wickman, Clark, Watson, Hancock, Shaw, Webb, Kidd, Meller, Evans, Hogsflesh, Slater, Croft, Turpin, Brown, Ochse, B. Rudman, S. Rudman, Caldicott, Watkins and R. Jones. The families travelled in three parties from Port Elizabeth, the last arriving at the Salem site on July 23. The name is of biblical origin (Genesis 14:18) and, proclaimed the Sunday after their arrival by the Reverend Shaw, means 'peace'; the local application refers to a reconciliation between sects.

A church built from mud blocks and thatch was consecrated in 1824, and replaced by a stone structure in 1832. The church often served as a refuge for women and children during the Frontier Wars. Several settler houses, built in the Georgian style, have been preserved.

In December 2017 the Constitutional Court upheld a land claim lodged in respect of the Salem Commonage by descendants of the Black community that previously occupied the land.
