= Professional Child Care College =

Professional Child Care College, located in South Africa, grew out of a course that was started in Cape Town in 1990 to train professional nannies. A branch was established in Johannesburg in 1991. In order to better meet the need for good child care the course was expanded to include the various modules which are in operation today. The Johannesburg branch became independent in 1995 and the Professional Child Care College was born.
