= Mukhanyo Theological College =

South African theological college

Mukhanyo Theological College is a multi-campus South African theological college with the lead campus located in KwaMhlanga, Mpumalanga, about an hour's drive northeast from Pretoria. Other centers are located in Pretoria, Johannesburg, Durban, Potchefstroom, Rustenburg and Cape Town. The college provides in-depth Bible training to church leaders and young people who want to prepare themselves for the ministry of God's Word, as pastors and as witnesses to the world.

The college is registered in South Africa as a private higher education institution and accredited to offer the following qualifications: Higher Certificate in Bible Teaching, Higher Certificate in Church Ministry, Bachelor of Theology, and Bachelor of Theology Honours, amongst other graduate programmes.
