= South African Theological Seminary =

Coordinates: 26.0523°S 28.0061°E

icon

The South African Theological Seminary (SATS) is a broadly evangelical distance education institution based in Bryanston (Johannesburg Region E), South Africa, founded in 1996. As of May 2018, Kevin Smith is the principal of the seminary. The seminary provides multiple undergraduate, graduate and stand alone courses to over 3000 students in over 80 countries. As of the start of 2016 SATS has graduated 574 B.Th students, 110 M.Th students and 40 PhD students.

== History and programs ==
The seminary was established by Christopher Peppler in 1996 and is one of the founding members of the National Association of Distance Education Organisation in South Africa (NADEOSA). SATS is accredited by the Council on Higher Education (CHE) and its qualifications are registered with the South African Department of Higher Education and Training. SATS has the authority to issue qualifications up to the doctorate level and provides the following programs: Undergraduate (Higher Certificate in Christian Life, Higher Certificate in Christian Counseling, Bachelor of Theology B.Th., Bachelor of Theology with a focus on Christian counselling) and post-graduate (B.Th. Honours, Master of Divinity, M.Th., Ph.D. in Theology).

SATS comes under the spiritual oversight of the elders of The Village Church which was planted by Rosebank Union Church. The seminary is broadly evangelical in its theological approach.

== Principals ==
- 1996-2005 Christopher Peppler (Th.D. University of Zululand).
- 2006-2017 Reuben van Rensburg (Th.D. University of Zululand).
- 2018–present Kevin Smith (D.Litt. University of Stellenbosch, Ph.D. South African Theological Seminary).

== See also ==
- List of universities in South Africa
