= Mangosuthu University of Technology =

University in Umlazi, South Africa

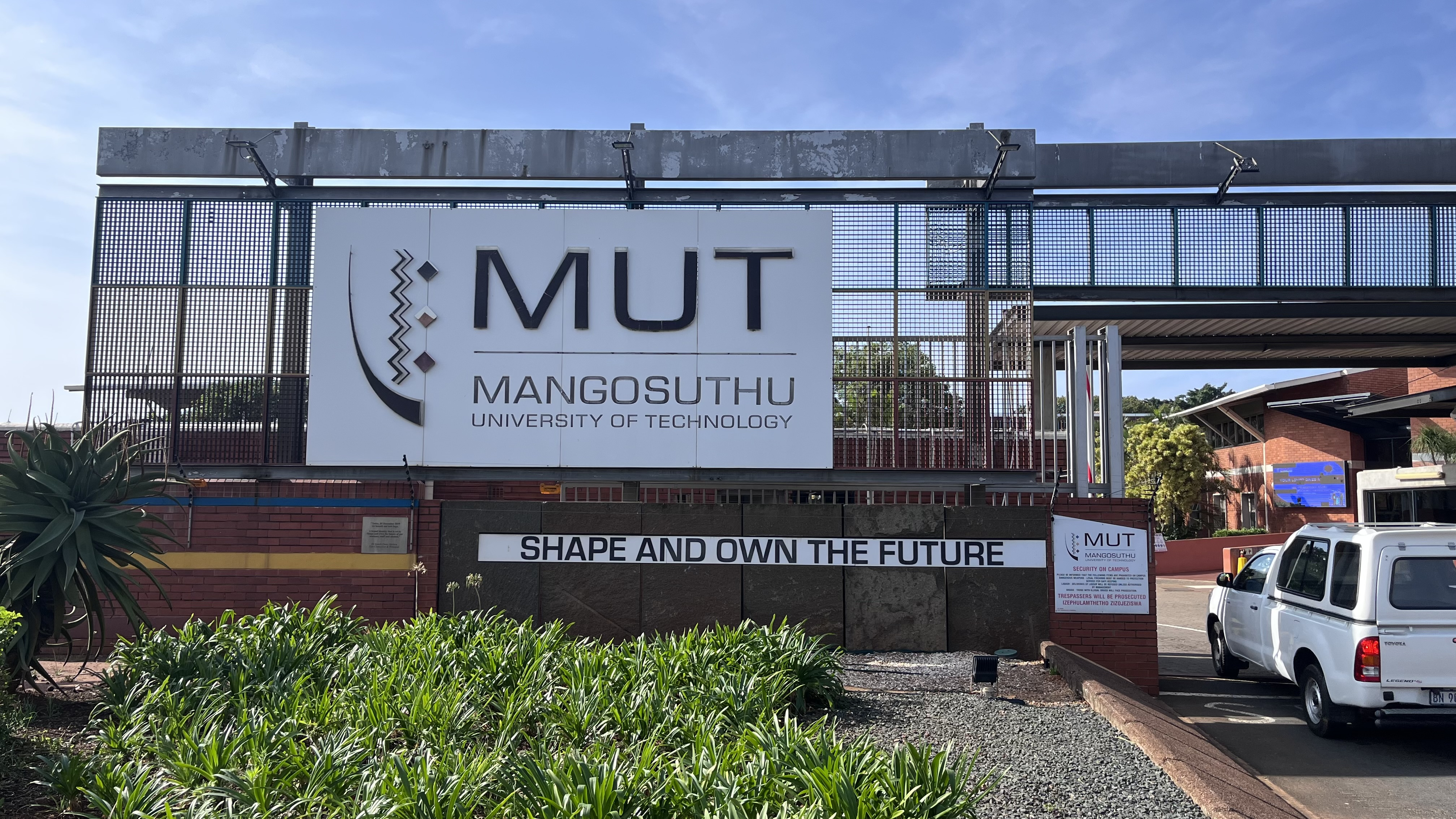
- Former names: Mangosuthu Technikon
- Motto in English: shape and own the future
- Type: Public; University of Technology
- Established: 1979
- Affiliations: AAU; ACU; HESA
- Chancellor: Sandile Zungu
- Vice-Chancellor: Professor N Sibiya
- Students: 13000
- Location: Umlazi, KwaZulu-Natal, South Africa; 29.9701°S 30.9137°E
- Campus: Suburban
- Publication: MUT Spirit, Good News Friday, Alumni Magazine and Boundless
- Colours: Maroon, Gold, Black and White
- Nickname: MUT
- Website: www.mut.ac.za

Mangosuthu University of Technology (MUT) is a university of technology situated in Umlazi near the city of Durban, South Africa, on a site overlooking the Indian Ocean. MUT is located in the academic hub in the eThekwini metropole. It is a residential university.

== History ==
Currently the fourth-largest township in South Africa, Umlazi got its name, according to legend, from a time when King Shaka passed through the area. He apparently refused to drink from the local stream, saying the water tasted like ‘umlaza’ – the acid taste from fermented milk.

Originally known as the Umlazi Mission Reserve and owned by the Anglican Church, it was earmarked by the government in 1940 as a relocation point for [Cato Manor] residents. This was contentious and was one of the causes of the Cato Manor riots of 1959. In 1967 Umlazi was declared a township, divided into 26 sections named for letters of the alphabet. It is the only township in South Africa with its own vehicle registration number;NUZ.

In 1974 the Chief Minister of KwaZulu, Dr [Mangosuthu Buthelezi], began discussing the idea of a dedicated tertiary educational institution specialising in technical subjects for black students, to meet the urgent and growing demand for expertise in these subjects.

Anglo American and De Beers Consolidated Mines pledged R5 million to start building the initial facility, and later they were joined by Mobil Oil, AECI, the S.A. Sugar Millers’ Association, the Rembrandt and Distillers Corporation, LTA Limited, Sasol and other sponsors, who pledged more funds to establish the Schools for Chemical Engineering, Mechanical Engineering, Electrical Engineering, Civil Engineering and Building, and Business and Secretarial Studies.

By mid-1977 the project could go ahead. The KwaZulu Cabinet decided to site the Technikon in Umlazi which, while part of KwaZulu, is also part of the Durban Metropolitan area. Given the urgency of the demand for technicians, and the need to build up the institution in an orderly fashion, it was decided to open its doors as soon as possible. Hence preliminary but permanent buildings were designed and built, and teaching began in 1979. The Technikon moved into its main buildings on their completion in September 1981.

In November 2007, Mangosuthu Technikon was renamed Mangosuthu University of Technology (MUT).

== See also ==
- Rankings of universities in South Africa
