= Foundation of Tertiary Institutions of the Northern Metropolis =

South African academic association

- FOTIM
- Formation: 1995
- Type: Association of universities
- Headquarters: Room 2002, Senate House, University of the Witwatersrand
- Location: South Africa
- Members: 9
- Website: http://www.fotim.ac.za

Foundation of Tertiary Institutions of the Northern Metropolis, FOTIM, is the biggest academic association in South Africa. FOTIM consists of nine universities and universities of technology in the Gauteng, Limpopo Province and North West Province.

FOTIM was created during 1995. The purpose of its creation is for regional collaboration between universities and universities of technology in the northern region of South Africa.

Some major projects of FOTIM include: Gauteng and Environs Library Consortium and VUMA.

== Projects ==
The Gauteng and Environs Library Consortium (GAELIC) remains the largest project of FOTIM. As a result of the work of this project, all member institutions have now implemented the INNOPAC library system, which is funded by the Andrew W Mellon Foundation. A major challenge will be the rationalisation of purchasing policies through agreements of collaboration between member institutions that now have access to each other's holdings.

The Information and Communication Technology (ICT) project, under way in all member institutions of FOTIM, has as two of its major aims the fostering of flexible learning and the building of capacity through human resource training and skills development in the information technology area.

Other FOTIM initiatives include matters pertaining to access, quality assurance, disability, HIV/AIDS and regional clearance of academic programmes. A number of workshops and meetings addressing these topics took place in 2001.

On the issue of academic programme collaboration, FOTIM commissioned two consultants to investigate opportunities for collaboration in the region. A report entitled Academic Programme Collaboration in the FOTIM Region is being examined and discussed by the senior management of member institutions. A meeting will be convened early in 2002 to consider the consultants' recommendations.

The year 2001 saw a significant increase in the importance and recognition accorded by the Department to the regional consortia at a time when the tertiary sector faces some of its greatest challenges in recent decades.

== Members ==
- University of Limpopo
- North-West University
- University of Johannesburg
- Tshwane University of Technology
- University of the Witwatersrand
- Vaal University of Technology
- University of Venda
- University of Pretoria
- University of South Africa
- Gauteng and Environs Library Consortium
