= Business Management Training College =

Business Management Training College (Pty) Ltd (BMT College)
- Motto: Prosperity through Knowledge
- Type: Registered Private Higher Education Institution (PHEI); Business College; Undergraduate
- Established: 1992
- Principal: Dr BA van der Linde
- Location: Johannesburg, Gauteng, South Africa
- Website: https://www.bmtcollege.ac.za/

Business Management Training College (BMT College) is a private higher education institution based in South Africa. It specialises in undergraduate qualifications in Business Management and Human Resource Management. The college is registered with the Department of Higher Education and Training (DHET) (Reg No 2011/HE07/002) as a distance education provider. The institution's qualifications are accredited by the Council on Higher Education (CHE).

The institution was established in 1992 as a distance education provider.

Established to cater to the needs of working professionals, BMT College offers flexible, online learning programs. The institution is known for its asynchronous learning model, which allows students to study at their own pace, and its online assessment methods, enabling learners to complete assessments at times most convenient to them.

The college is also actively involved in promoting ethical practices in education and has recently achieved FSCA (Financial Sector Conduct Authority) approval for its Higher Certificate in Business Management.
