= Baptist Theological College of Southern Africa =

Theological college in Randburg, South Africa

Coordinates: 26.09936°S 28.00071°E

- Motto: Equipping Believers for Ministry Globally
- Type: Private
- Established: 1951
- Affiliation: Baptist Union of Southern Africa
- President: Prof. 'Piff' G. C. Pereira
- Location: Randburg, South Africa
- Website: btc.co.za

The Baptist Theological College of Southern Africa (BTC) is a Baptist theological institute located in Randburg, South Africa. The college's current principal is Prof. 'Piff' G. C. Pereira who succeeded Prof. Martin Pohlmann who had served as the Principal for 14 years until 2017.

== History ==
The college was established in 1951 by the Baptist Union of Southern Africa to prepare pastors for Baptist churches. Building on its Baptist heritage, today the college welcomes students from all denominations who seek to equip themselves for Christian ministry. In 2019, more than 500 students were registered across the College's different qualification programmes.

== Programs ==
The college offers qualifications including the Higher Certificate in Ministry (Pastoral Major), Bachelor of Biblical Studies, Bachelor of Theology and Master of Theology. The college is registered with the Department of Higher Education and Training as a Higher Education Institution, and its programmes are accredited by the Council on Higher Education (CHE).
