= South African Business Schools Association =

South African Business Schools Association - SABSA
- Abbreviation: SABSA
- Formation: 2004
- Type: Business Schools Association
- Legal status: Non Profit Organisation
- Headquarters: Johannesburg, South Africa
- Location: South Africa
- Region served: South Africa
- Members: 22
- Official language: English
- Chair: Prof Morris Mthombeni
- Board of directors: Prof Morris Mthombeni, Prof Fulu Netswera, Prof Catherine Duggan, General Manager: Anne Wilson
- Website: www.sabsa.co.za

The South African Business Schools Association (SABSA) is an association of South African business schools offering accredited MBA programmes. Institutions are accredited in South Africa by the Council on Higher Education (CHE), whilst institutions also pursue international accreditation from AMBA, EQUIS, and AACSB.

== Members ==
Business School	Institution	City	Accreditation	Year founded
The Da Vinci Institute of Technology Business School	Da Vinci Institute	Johannesburg	CHE	
DUT-Faculty of Management Sciences	Durban University of Technology	Durban	CHE	
Gordon Institute of Business Science (GIBS)	University of Pretoria	Johannesburg	CHE, AMBA	2000†
Graduate School of Business	University of KwaZulu-Natal	Durban	CHE	
Graduate School of Business and Government Leadership	North-West University	Mafikeng	CHE	
Henley Business School Africa	Henley Business School	Johannesburg	CHE, AMBA, EQUIS, AACSB	1992
IIEMSA	IIEMSA	Johannesburg	CHE	2001
Management College of South Africa- MANCOSA	MANCOSA	Johannesburg	CHE	
Milpark Business School	Stadio University	Johannesburg	CHE	
Nelson Mandela Metropolitan University Business School	Nelson Mandela Metropolitan University	Port Elizabeth	CHE	2005
Potchefstroom Business School	North-West University	Potchefstroom	CHE	
Regenesys Business School	Regenesys	Johannesburg	CHE	
Regent Business School	Regent	Johannesburg	CHE	
Rhodes Business School	Rhodes University	Grahamstown	CHE, AMBA	2000
Richfield Graduate Institute Business School	Richfield	Umhlanga	CHE	
UNISA Graduate School of Business Leadership (SBL)	University of South Africa	Midrand	CHE	1965
Tshwane School for Business & Society	Tshwane University of Technology	Pretoria	CHE	1999
Turfloop Graduate School of Leadership - TGSL	University of Limpopo	Polokwane	CHE	1997
UCT Graduate School of Business (GSB)	University of Cape Town	Cape Town	CHE, EQUIS	
Stellenbosch Business School	Stellenbosch University	Cape Town	CHE, AMBA, EQUIS	1964
University of the Free State Business School	University of the Free State	Bloemfontein	CHE	
Wits Business School (WBS)	University of the Witwatersrand	Johannesburg	CHE, AMBA	1968

† Note as of January 2008 GIBS replaced the Graduate School of Management, which was founded in 1949 and was the first MBA programme to be launched outside of North America.

== Partners ==
SABSA partners with the Association of African Business Schools (AABS), and SADCnet (funded by the W. K. Kellogg Foundation, the Gordon Institute of Business Science and the University of Botswana). SADCnet offers workshops for business school leaders in the Southern African Development Community (SADC).
