= International Peace University of South Africa =

Coordinates: 33°58′32″S 18°31′23″E

'International Peace University South Africa', now known as the International Peace College South Africa (IPSA) was established when the Islamic College of Southern Africa (ICOSA) and Darul Arqam Islamic Institute (DAII) merged in 2005. It became the first registered higher tertiary institution offering a Higher Certificate and Bachelor of Arts degree in Islamic Studies when the college was accredited by the Council on Higher Education and registered with the Department of Higher Education and Training, and listed on the South African Qualifications Authority registry.
