= Rankings of universities in South Africa =

Location of South Africa

Lists that rank universities are regularly published by the popular press. Intended originally as a marketing or a benchmarking tool, university rankings are also used for research evaluation and policy initiatives.

Major ranking organizations (see tables below) attempt to fulfill a demand for information and transparency. However, rankings influence evaluation choices and distort higher education policies. Organizations that publish these university rankings also use data analytics and maintain repositories of data that is related to institutions. They use this information to offering consulting services.

The effect is that a few private data compnow are effectively responsible for educational governance. Termed the “analytics-industrial complex" ranking are more than measurements of quality, these privately held rankings define quality, shaping policy discussions and decisions.

These list producers also allow well remunerated vice-chancellors to justify their remuneration and claim a top spot for their university in an educational league.

These ranking, the publishers claim, are determined by quantitative indicators. Published research suggests otherwise, rankings are re-shaping public education and harming the academic project. According to an Independent Expert Group (IEG), convened by the United Nations University International Institute for Global Health, Global university rankings are

- conceptually invalid
- based on flawed and insufficiently transparent data and methods
- biased towards research, STEM subjects, and English-speaking scholars
- are colonial and accentuate global, regional, and national inequalities.

Rankings of universities in South Africa are used to influence how students, parents, policymakers, employers, the wider public and other stakeholders think about higher education. These local league tables are based on international university rankings since there are no South African rankings yet. This absence might be attributed to international criticism of college and university rankings.

Its generally agreed that rankings apply questionable criteria and an opaque methodology. The Council for Higher Education (CHE) has recently taken a critical perspective on university rankings, publishing an opinion that argues that rankings are both neocolonial and neoliberal. According to the author, more than 47 publishing companies have used “inappropriate indicators …as a proxy for offering a quality education”.

Higher Education is being re-shaped by private for-profit companies and are part of a billion-dollar profit center for the companies owning them. Ranking companies prey on universities and governments in the global south, and their anxieties to be seen as a “world class” university. This has led to number of gaming behaviors in the sector.

This is a global problem, and it seems that Higher Education priorities are misplaced, with marketing and communications officials focused on branding their institutions, looking appealing to prospective students, by referring repeatedly to rankings, instead of focusing on the needs of actual students. Since 2013, Rhodes University has held this critical position about rankings Rhodes position was given credence by Wits University, when Wits recently re-published an article in “The Conversation” entitled “ University rankings are unscientific and bad for education: experts point out the flaws”.

This stance is increasingly supported by notable institutions beyond North America, such as the University of Zurich, Utrecht University, and some of the Indian Institutes of Technology. Recently Nature concurred with this opinion that rankings are methodologically problematic.

Notwithstanding the above information, the numerous international university rankings do seem to agree that South Africa's university system is the strongest on the continent: it is home to 8 of the top 10 highest ranked African universities.

The University of Cape Town has for numerous years been the highest ranked university in Africa, and has a highly-regarded academic reputation, and significant contribution to global research. The top five universities in South Africa are, in order of the 2027 QS World University Rankings, the University of Cape Town, University of Johannesburg, Stellenbosch University, University of the Witwatersrand, and University of Pretoria.

== Context on South African higher educational institutions ==
A 2010 Centre for Higher Education Transformation report identified three university clusters in South Africa, grouped according to function. The input variables used to group universities were:

- Percentage of headcount enrolment in science, engineering and technology
- Masters and doctoral enrolments
- Student-to-staff ratios
- Permanent staff with doctoral degrees
- Private and government income
- Student fee income

The output variables were:

- Student success rates
- Graduation rates
- Weighted research output units per permanent staff member

The Red cluster constitutes the top research-intensive universities. The Blue cluster consists of institutions focused primarily on technical training, while the Green cluster includes institutions which show characteristics of both missions. The clusters are:

South African University Clusters
Red Cluster	Green Cluster	Blue Cluster
Top Research-Intensive Universities	Research-Intensive Universities & Technical Training	Technical Training
University of the Witwatersrand	University of the Free State	Vaal University of Technology
Stellenbosch University	University of KwaZulu-Natal	Central University of Technology
University of Cape Town	North-West University	Durban University of Technology
University of Pretoria	University of Fort Hare	Mangosuthu University of Technology
Rhodes University	University of Limpopo	Tshwane University of Technology
	University of the Western Cape	Cape Peninsula University of Technology
	University of Johannesburg	University of Venda
	Nelson Mandela Metropolitan University	Walter Sisulu University
	University of Zululand	

== Rankings ==
In part because of the inherent difficulty of ranking complex educational institutions, there are an expanding number of competing international university ranking schemes, each with a different emphasis. Four of the most prominent are the Times Higher Education World University Rankings (most widely accepted), The Center for World University Rankings (CWUR), QS World University Rankings, and the Academic Ranking of World Universities (ARWU, sometimes referred to as the "Shanghai Rankings").

=== Times Higher Education World University rankings ===
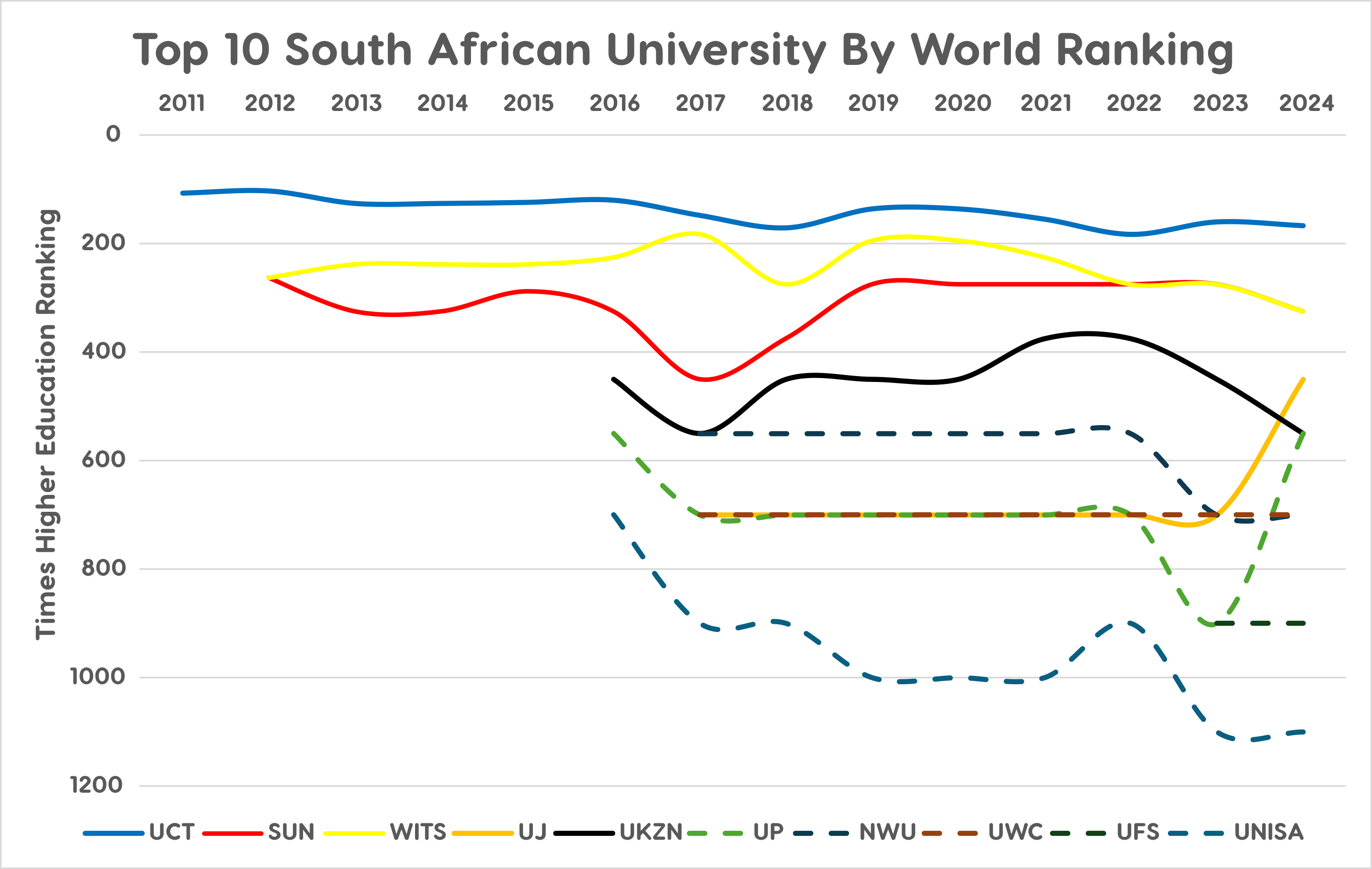
Top 10 South African University By World Ranking According To Times Higher Education

The Times Higher Education World University Rankings ranked the top South African universities as follows:

Times Higher Education 2011 to 2027 South Africa Rank
SA Rank	University	World Rank																
SA Rank	University	2027	2026	2025	2024	2023	2022	2021	2020	2019	2018	2017	2016	2015	2014	2013	2012	2011
1	University of Cape Town	147	164	180	167	160	183	155	136	136	171	148	120	124	126	126	103	107
2	University of the Witwatersrand	301–325	301–350	301–350	301–350	251–300	251–300	201–250	194	194	251–300	182	201-250	251-275	226-250	226-250	251-275	-
3	Stellenbosch University	326–350	301–350	301–350	301–350	251–300	251–300	251–300	251–300	251–300	351–400	401-500	301-350	276-300	301-350	301-350	251-275	-
4	University of Johannesburg	351–375	351–400	401–500	401–500	601–800	601–800	601–800	601–800	601–800	601–800	601-800	-	-	-	-	-	-
5	University of Pretoria	451–500	501–600	601–800	501–600	801–1000	601–800	601–800	601–800	601–800	601–800	601-800	501-600	-	-	-	-	-
6	University of KwaZulu-Natal	501–550	501–600	501–600	501–600	401–500	351–400	351–400	401–500	401–500	401–500	501-600	401-500	-	-	-	-	-
7	University of the Western Cape	701–800	601–800	601–800	601–800	601–800	601–800	601–800	601–800	601–800	601–800	601-800	-	-	-	-	-	-
8	North-West University	801–1000	801–1000	801–1000	601–800	601–800	501–600	501–600	501–600	501–600	-	-	-	-	-	-	-	-
=9	Durban University of Technology	1201–1400	1501+	1201–1500	1001–1200	501–600	401–500	401–500	-	-	-	-	-	-	-	-	-	-
=9	University of South Africa	1201–1400	1201–1500	1201–1500	1001–1200	1001–1200	801–1000	1001+	1001+	1001+	801–1000	801+	601-800	-	-	-	-	-
=9	University of the Free State	1201–1400	1001–1200	1001–1200	801–1000	801–1000	-	-	-	-	-	-	-	-	-	-	-	-
=12	Nelson Mandela University	1401–1600	1201–1500	-	-	-	-	-	-	-	-	-	-	-	-	-	-	-
=12	Sefako Makgatho Health Sciences University	1401–1600	1201–1500	1201–1500	-	-	-	-	-	-	-	-	-	-	-	-	-	-
=15	Walter Sisulu University	1801–2000	-	-	-	-	-	-	-	-	-	-	-	-	-	-	-	-
=15	Tshwane University of Technology	1801-2000	-	-	1201–1500	-	1001–1200	1001+	801–1000	801–1000	-	-	-	-	-	-	-	-
=17	University of Venda	1801–2000	-	1501+	1201–1500	-	-	-	-	-	-	-	-	-	-	-	-	-
=17	Vaal University of Technology	1801–2000	-	-	-	-	-	-	-	-	-	-	-	-	-	-	-	-
	Rhodes University	-	-	-	-	801–1000	-	-	-	-	-	-	-	-	-	-	-	-
	Cape Peninsula University of Technology	-	-	-	1201–1500	-	-	-	-	-	-	-	-	-	-	-	-	-
	University of Fort Hare	-	-	1501+	-	1201–1500	-	-	-	-	-	-	-	-	-	-	-	-

=== QS World University rankings ===
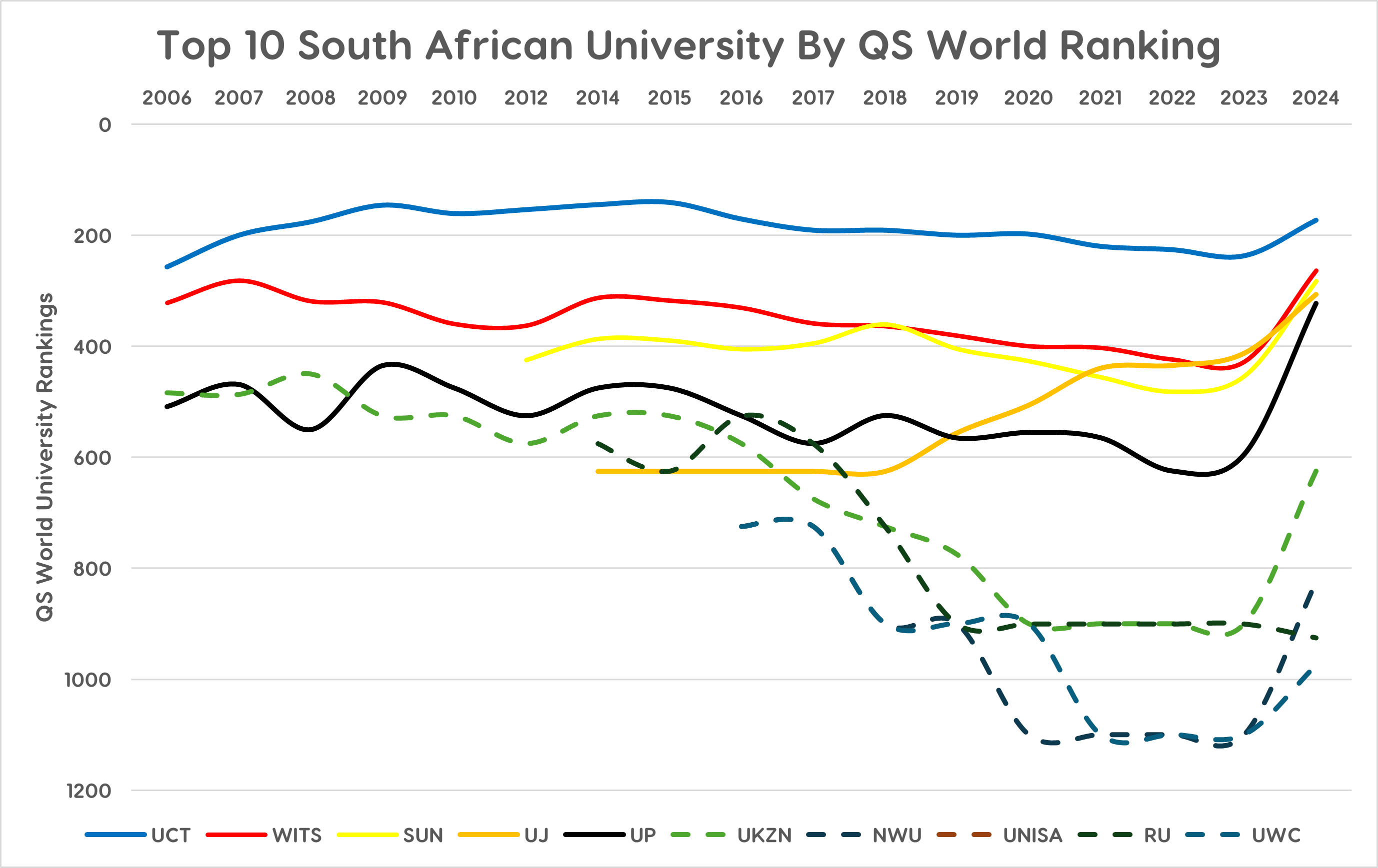
Top 10 South African University By World Ranking According To QS (2004 through 2024)

QS World University Rankings ranked the top South African universities as in the table below.

(Before 2010 the ranking was known as the Times Higher Education-QS World University Rankings)

The University of Cape Town (UCT) has consistently ranked as the top university not only in South Africa, but across the continent of Africa. In the 2026 QS ranking, UCT ranked first in the categories of Academic Reputation, Employer Reputation, Sustainability, and Web Impact.

QS World University 2006 to 2026 South Africa Rank
SA Rank	University	World Rank																		
SA Rank	University	2026	2025	2024	2023	2022	2021	2020	2019	2018	2017	2016	2015	2014	2012	2010	2009	2008	2007	2006
1	University of Cape Town	150	171	173	237	226	220	198	200	191	191	171	141	145	154	161	146	176	200	257
2	University of Witwatersrand	291	267	264	428	424	403	400	381	364	359	331	318	313	363	360	321	319	282	322
3	Stellenbosch University	302	296	283	454	482	456	427	405	361	395	401-410	390	387	401- 450	-	-	-	-	-
4	University of Johannesburg	308	312	306	412	434	439	501-510	551-560	601-650	601-650	601-650	601-650	601-650	-	-	-	-	-	-
5	University of Pretoria	362	354	323	591-600	601-650	561-570	551-560	561-570	501-550	551-600	501-550	471-480	471-480	501-550	451–500	401–500	501–600	469	509
6	University of Kwazulu-Natal	558	587	621-630	801-1,000	801-1,000	801-1,000	801-1,000	751-800	701-750	651-700	551-600	501-550	501-550	551-600	501–550	501–600	401–500	487	484
7	North-West University	951-1,000	851-900	801-850	1001-1200	1001-1200	1001+	1001+	801-1,000	801-1,000	701+	701+	-	-	-	-	-	-	-	-
8	University of South Africa	901-950	851-900	851-900	-	-	-	-	-	-	-	-	-	-	-	-	-	-	-	-
9	Rhodes University	1,001-1,200	951-1,000	901-950	801-1,000	801-1,000	801-1,000	801-1,000	801-1,000	701-750	551-600	501-550	601-650	551-600	-	-	-	-	-	-
10	University of the Western Cape	951-1,000	951-1,000	951-1,000	1,001-1,200	1,001-1,200	1,001+	801-1,000	801-1,000	801-1,000	701+	701+	-	-	-	-	-	-	-	-
11	University of the Free State	1,001-1,200	1,001-1,200	1,001-1,200	-	-	-	-	-	-	-	-	-	-	-	-	-	-	-	-

=== ARWU/Shanghai ===
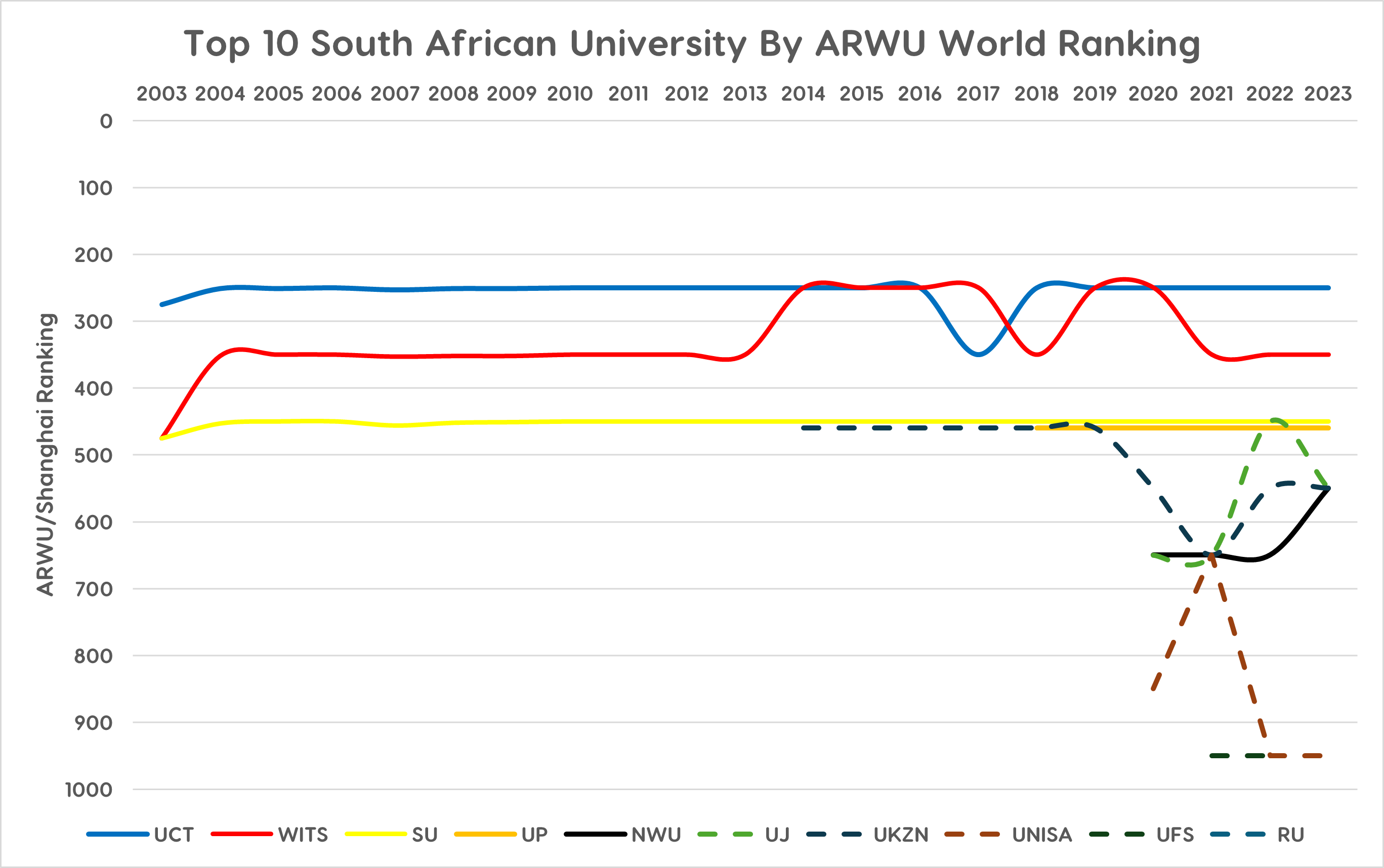
Top 10 South African University By World Ranking According To ARWU

The Academic Ranking of World Universities has ranked the top South African universities as follows:

ARWU/Shanghai 2003 to 2024 South Africa Rank
SA rank	University	World Rank																				
SA rank	University	2023	2022	2021	2020	2019	2018	2017	2016	2015	2014	2013	2012	2011	2010	2009	2008	2007	2006	2005	2004	2003
1	University of Cape Town	201-300	201-300	201-300	201-300	201-300	201-300	301-400	201-300	201-300	201–300	201–300	201–300	201–300	201–300	201–302	201–302	203–304	201–300	203–300	202–301	251–300
2	University of the Witwatersrand	301-400	301-400	301-400	201-300	201-300	301-400	201-300	201-300	201-300	201–300	301–400	301–400	301–400	301–400	303–401	303–401	305–402	301–400	301–400	302–403	451–500
=3	Stellenbosch University	401-500	401-500	401-500	401-500	401-500	401-500	401-500	401-500	401-500	401–500	401–500	401–500	401–500	401–500	402–501	402–503	403–510	401–500	401–500	404–502	451–500
=3	University of Pretoria	401-500	401-500	401-500	401-500	401-500	401-500	-	-	-	-	-	-		-	-	-	-	-	-	-	-
=5	North-West University	501-600	601-700	601-700	601-700	-	-	-	-	-	-	-	-		-	-	-	-	-	-	-	-
=5	University of Johannesburg	501-600	401-500	601-700	601-700	-	-	401-500	-	-	-	-	-		-	-	-	-	-	-	-	-
=5	University of KwaZulu-Natal	501-600	501-600	601-700	501-600	401-500	-	401-500	401-500	401-500	401–500	-	-		-	-	-	-	-	-	-	-
8	University of South Africa	901-1000	901-1000	601-700	801-900	-	-	-	-	-	-	-	-		-	-	-	-	-	-	-	-
9	University of the Free State	-	901-1000	901-1000	-	-	-	-	-	-	-	-	-		-	-	-	-	-	-	-	-
10	Rhodes University	-	-	-	901-1000	-	-	-	-	-	-	-	-		-	-	-	-	-	-	-	-

Note: These are the only ranked South African universities.

=== Center for World University Rankings (CWUR) ===
The CWUR ranked the top South African Universities as follows:

2024 Center for World University Rankings (CWUR)
SA Rank	University	2024
1	University of Cape Town	271
2	University of the Witwatersrand	291
3	Stellenbosch University	440
4	University of KwaZulu-Natal	483
5	University of Pretoria	538
6	University of Johannesburg	624
7	North-West University	869
8	University of the Free State	1127
9	University of Western Cape	1154
10	University of South Africa	1293
11	Rhodes University	1321
12	Nelson Mandela University	1707
13	Tshwane University of Technology	1959

=== Round University Ranking (RUR) ===
2024 Round University Ranking (RUR)
SA Rank	University	2024
1	University of Cape Town	176
2	University of Witwatersrand	396
3	University of KwaZulu Natal	442
4	Stellenbosch University	458
5	University of Johannesburg	490
6	University of Pretoria	503
7	University of South Africa	683

=== U.S. News & World Report Best Global Universities Ranking (USNWR Global‌) ===
2024 USNWR Global‌ Rankings
SA Rank	University	2024
1	University of Cape Town	116
2	University of Witwatersrand	264
3	Stellenbosch University	311
4	University of Johannesburg	357
5	University of Kwazulu Natal	401
6	University of Pretoria	439
7	North West University	540
8	University of the Western Cape	726
9	University of South Africa	861
10	University of the Free State	912
11	Rhodes University	953
12	Tshwane University of Technology	1181
13	Durban University of Technology	1223
14	Nelson Mandela University	1268
15	University of Limpopo	2182
16	University of Venda	Unranked

=== Scimago Global‌ Rankings ===
2024 Scimago Global‌ University Rankings
SA Rank	University	2024
1	University of Cape Town	838
2	University of the Witwatersrand, Johannesburg	1247
3	Stellenbosch University	1295
4	University of Pretoria	1297
5	University of KwaZulu-Natal *	1354
6	University of Johannesburg	1699
7	North-West University	2201
8	University of South Africa	2779
9	University of the Western Cape	3498
10	University of the Free State	4236
11	Tshwane University of Technology	4691
12	University of Fort Hare	4865
13	Rhodes University	5258
14	Durban University of Technology	5769
15	University of Venda	5959
16	Walter Sisulu University	5969
17	Nelson Mandela Metropolitan University	5994
18	Cape Peninsula University of Technology	6246
19	University of Limpopo	6884
20	Central University of Technology, Free State	7065
21	University of Zululand	7105
22	Sefako Makgatho Health Sciences University	7294
23	Vaal University of Technology	7811

=== University Ranking by Academic Performance (URAP) ===
URAP, which is a newer ranking scheme based solely on quantitative measures of academic productivity, includes data for a larger number of global universities, and thus gives an alternative view of the relative standing of more South African institutions. The 2020-2021 edition of URAP ranked the top South African Universities as follows:

2024 URAP University Rankings
SA Rank	University	2024
1	University of Cape Town	243
2	University of Witwatersrand	340
3	Stellenbosch University	362
4	University of Kwazulu Natal	371
5	University of Johannesburg	467
6	University of Pretoria	475
7	North West University	589
8	University of the Free State	884
9	University of South Africa	970
10	University of the Western Cape	1048
11	Rhodes University	1298
12	Durban University of Technology	1328
13	Tshwane University of Technology	1392
14	Nelson Mandela University	1432
15	University of Fort Hare	1952
16	Sefako Makgatho Health Sciences University	2229
17	University of Venda	2255
18	Cape Peninsula University of Technology	2365
19	University of Limpopo	2420
20	Walter Sisulu University	2653
21	University of Zululand	2735
22	Vaal University of Technology (VUT)	2938

== Admission Rates ==
University admissions in South Africa are highly competitive. South Africa has many universities renowned for their quality education and research opportunities. The limited number of spots available and the growing demand for tertiary education create high competition among matriculating students.

South African universities have some of the lowest admission rates, as only NSC Results, standardized test scores (National Benchmark Test) and demographic information play a role in determining admission.

In 2023, around 900 000 students participated in the NSC final exams, with around 570 000 students passing. South African universities have around 140 000 spaces for first years. Application costs range from Free to R300 ($15). Applications request the student's Grade 11 NSC results, Gender, Race and additionally may require the student to take the National Benchmark Test. Acceptance rates range from 1.35% to 20%.

University Admissions Rates in South Africa (Note: University has free Applications) (Note: SA Rank Based on Times Higher Education World University Rankings)
SA Rank	University name	Applications	Accepted students	Acceptance rate	Source
1	University of Cape Town	92 841	4 500	4.85%	
=2	Stellenbosch University	88 085	5 600	6.36%	
=2	University of the Witwatersrand	140 000	6 000	4.29%	
4	University of Johannesburg	283 000	10 500	3.71%	
=5	University of Pretoria	116 994	7 675	6.56%	
=5	University of Kwazulu Natal	120 000	9 000	7.50%	
=7	University of the Western Cape	70 000*	4 500	6.43%	
=7	North West University	181 000*	11 717	6.47%	
=9	University of the Free State	240 393*	8 100	3.37%	
=11	Durban University of Technology	174 925	8 564	4.90%	
=13	University of Fort Hare	258 726	3 500	1.35%	
=13	Tshwane University of Technology	100 000	12 549	12.55%	
n/a	Nelson Mandela Metropolitan University	67 022*	7 200	10.74%	
n/a	Cape Peninsula University of Technology	72 000	9 000	12.50%	
n/a	University of Zululand	184 021	6 085	3.31%	
n/a	Vaal University of Technology	20 989	5 404	25.75%	
n/a	Central University of Technology	211 186*	6 283	2.98%	
n/a	Walter Sisulu University	304 671*	7 000	2.30%	
n/a	University of Limpopo	200 000	5 100	2.55%	

== See also ==
- College and university rankings
