= Academic boycott of South Africa =

Series of boycotts of South African academic institutions and scholars

The academic boycott of South Africa comprised a series of boycotts of South African academic institutions and scholars initiated in the mid-1960s, at the request of the African National Congress, with the goal of using such international pressure to force the end to South Africa's system of apartheid. The boycotts were part of a larger international campaign of "isolation" that eventually included political, economic, cultural and sports boycotts. The academic boycotts ended in 1990, when its stated goal of ending apartheid was achieved.

An academic boycott isolates scholars by depriving them of the formal and informal resources they need to carry on their scholarship. An academic boycott can include:

1. Scholars refusing to collaborate with South African scholars on research,
2. Publishers, journals, and other scholarly resources refusing to publish scholarship or experiments by South African scholars, or refusing to provide access to scholars in South Africa,
3. International conferences refusing to locate in South Africa or include South African scholars,
4. Scholars refusing to travel to South Africa or participate in activities such as serving on thesis committees for South African students,
5. Universities and other institutions worldwide refusing to grant access to their resources to South African scholars, or to invite South African scholars to their own institutions.

Both during and after the apartheid era, there was debate whether academic boycotts were an effective or appropriate form of sanctions. Even within anti-apartheid circles there was debate over whether the boycotts were ethically justified, and whether they hurt liberal scholars more than conservative ones. Campus libertarians criticised the ban because they believed it interfered with academic freedom, and conservative groups worldwide criticised the boycotts simply because they "disliked such anti-apartheid initiatives".

Subsequent research in the post-apartheid area has claimed that the boycotts were more a "symbolic gesture of support" for anti-apartheid efforts rather than a direct influencer of the situation. Additionally, the academic boycott was perceived by the targets of the boycott, South Africa scholars, as unjust and anti-South African.

== Motivation ==
The African National Congress first called for an academic boycott to protest South African apartheid in 1958 in Ghana. The call was repeated the following year in London.

== Formal declarations ==
=== British Academics ===
In 1965, 496 university professors and lecturers from 34 British universities signed the following declaration in protest against apartheid and violations of academic freedom. They referred to the bans against Jack Simons and Eddie Roux, two well-known progressive academics who had been banned from teaching and writing in South Africa because of their political beliefs.

ACADEMIC BOYCOTT OF SOUTH AFRICA: DECLARATION BY BRITISH ACADEMICS, 1965

We, the (undersigned) professors and lecturers in British universities in consultation with the Anti-Apartheid Movement:

1. Protest against the bans imposed on Professors Simons and Roux;
2. Protest against the practice of racial discrimination and its extension to higher education;
3. Pledge that we shall not apply for or accept academic posts in South African universities which practise racial discrimination.

=== United Nations ===
In December 1980, the United Nations passed a resolution "Cultural, Academic and other boycotts of South Africa":

The General Assembly, .. Noting that the racist regime of South Africa is using cultural, academic, sports and other contacts to promote its propaganda for the inhumane policies of apartheid and "bantustanation",

1. Requests all States to take steps to prevent all cultural, academic, sports, and other exchanges with the racist regime of South Africa;

: :

2. Also requests States that have not yet done so:

: :

2 (b) To cease any cultural and academic collaboration with South Africa, including the exchange of scientists, students and academic personalities, as well as cooperation on research programmes.

: :

4. Urges all academic and cultural institutions to terminate all links with South Africa

5. Encourages anti-apartheid and solidarity movements in their campaigns for cultural, academic and sports boycotts of South Africa

== Apartheid-era debate ==
"The ethical and other issues surrounding the academic boycott deeply divided the academic community, both within and outside South Africa."

=== Proponents ===
"Boycott proponents argued that academics should not be treated as an elite detached from the political and social environment in which it functions, especially since some of the South African universities seemed to be tools of the Nationalist government."

==== Desmond Tutu ====
Desmond Tutu, a prominent leader within the anti-apartheid, described his clear support for the academic boycott of South Africa. He wrote that it needed to be maintained for institutions which had a bad record in opposing apartheid, but could be lifted for others as the political situation eased. The boycott had "certainly made a number of people sit up and take notice, especially the so-called liberal universities."

They thought that just as a matter of right they would find acceptance because they were allowing blacks into their establishments. I mustn't belittle them too much, I think that they did stand up for academic freedom and so forth, but I don't think myself actually that they were sufficiently vigorous and the boycott helped to knock sense into their heads, to realise that they did have a role in seeking to undermine that vicious system [of apartheid].

I would, I think, now still say that we maintain [the academic boycott] insofar as, if for instance academics from here want to go to South Africa then you want to look at who is inviting them. Under whose auspices are they going? Are they going to institutions that have a good track record in their opposition to apartheid? But I would say that as things begin to ease up, this ought perhaps to be one of the first of the constraints that goes to give some of these people the reward.

But I would myself say it is important for academics outside of South Africa also to say they want to reward places like UWC which stuck their necks out and then let these others get the crumbs that remain from the table.

=== Opponents ===
"Opposition to this boycott persisted throughout the 1980s: conservatives around the world disliked such anti-apartheid initiatives; campus libertarians perceived a loss of academic freedom; and some liberal South Africans argued that their universities, as centres of resistance to apartheid, made precisely the wrong targets."

==== From within anti-Apartheid circles ====
Opponents from within anti-Apartheid circles "argued that ideas and knowledge should be treated differently than tangible commodities, that obstacles to information access could actually hurt the victims of apartheid (for example, retard medical research and, ultimately, reduce the quality of health care), and that an academic boycott (in contrast to economic, trade, or political boycott) would not even be noticed by the South African government. Change is much more likely to occur by providing information than by withholding it."

Such a boycott would cut a university off from its life blood, the nurturing flow of ideas.... The campaign plays directly into the hands of the destructive right-wing in this country which would also dearly love to cut us off from the world and its influences.

Solomon Benatar, a critic, wrote that

Academic boycott has been justified as an appropriate political strategy in the struggle against the oppression of apartheid. Moral outrage against racist policies has led to the claim that academic boycott is a morally imperative component of a broader sanctions policy. This claim has neither been substantiated by a reasoned ethical argument nor weighted against an ethically justifiable approach that is consistent with universal humanitarian aspirations and which allows rejection of apartheid to be coupled to constructive endeavours.

===== "Selective" Alternatives =====
Solomon Benatar, a professor at University of Cape Town, and others advocated an alternative proposal: a "selective boycott"/"selective support" effort which would boycott South African organizations only if they were practitioners of apartheid and would extend support to organizations that did not practice apartheid. This alternative proposal was criticized because of both "the practical problems of implementation" and that "it implicitly endorsed the idea that political views are valid determinants of who should attend scholarly meetings, whose work should be published, and so on."

== Post-Apartheid analysis ==
"That most of the scholars in our study judged the boycott to be an irritant or inconvenience, rather than a significant barrier to scholarly progress, suggests that it proved more a symbolic gesture than an effective agent of change."

=== Easily circumvented ===
"The academic boycott was more of an irritation than a true obstacle to scholarly progress."

"In most cases, scholars and libraries were able to circumvent the boycott one way or another—for example, by using 'third parties' in less antagonistic countries although with delays and at greater expense."

=== Perceived as unjust discrimination ===
"Many [South African] scholars felt left out, isolated, unjustly discriminated against."

"Suspicions were created" ... "that a submission was really rejected for political reasons, not the reasons claimed", "that the high incidence of inactive research materials, such as biological agents and antibodies, received by South African institutions was not a mere coincidence"

== Comparisons to academic boycotts of Israel ==
The academic boycott of South Africa is frequently invoked as a model for more recent efforts to organize academic boycotts of Israel.

Some invoke the comparison to claim that an academic boycott of Israel should not be controversial based on the misconception that the academic boycott of South Africa was uncontroversial and straightforward. The reality, at the time, was very different. The effort was the subject of significant criticism and contentious debate from diverse segments. Andrew Beckett writes, in the Guardian, on what he believes to be a mistaken comparison:

In truth, boycotts are blunt weapons. Even the most apparently straightforward and justified ones, on closer inspection, have their controversies and injustices.

Other, such as Hillary and Stephen Rose in Nature, make the comparison and argue for an academic boycott of Israel based on a belief that the academic boycott of South Africa was effective in ending apartheid. George Fink responds to this claim in a letter to Nature:

The assertion [...] that the boycott of South Africa by the world's academic communities 'was instrumental in ending apartheid in South Africa' is a deception.

The African National Congress, which was the leading anti-apartheid movement in South Africa, has made available archival documentation to support their assertion that the boycott campaign, but not the academic boycott specifically, was, indeed, instrumental in ending apartheid.

== See also ==
- History of South Africa in the apartheid era
- Anti-Apartheid Movement (UK)
- Internal resistance to South African apartheid
- Disinvestment from South Africa
