= Vaal University of Technology =

Public university in South Africa

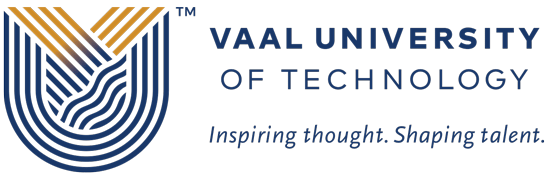
- Other name: VUT
- Former name: Vaal Triangle College
- Motto: Inspiring thought, Shaping Talent
- Type: Public
- Established: 1966; 60 years ago
- Affiliations: AAU; ACU; FOTIM; HESA; SACU
- Vice-Chancellor: Prof Khehla Ndlovu
- Administrative staff: 1,000+
- Students: 19,000+
- Location: Vanderbijlpark, Gauteng, South Africa; 26°42′38″S 27°51′39″E
- Colours: Sapphire, Gold & Dandelion
- Website: www.vut.ac.za

Vaal University of Technology (VUT) is a higher education institution in South Africa. It attracts students from all over the country. It is one of the largest residential universities of technology, with about 20 000 students, 40 programs, all primarily taught in English. The campus and facilities are conducive to learning, research, recreation and sport, art and culture, and community service. The campuses have lecture halls, laboratories, a number of auditoriums and office space situated on 46,000 m^{2} (500,000 sq ft).

== History ==
The forerunner to the Vaal University of Technology was named the Vaal Triangle College for Advanced Technical Education. Situated in Vanderbijlpark in South Africa's industrial heartland, it opened to 189 students (taught by 15 members of staff ) in 1966. Growth was rapid. In 1975, new buildings – including a library, gymnasium, laboratories and lecture halls – enabled growth to continue, so that by 1978 student enrolments reached 3,000 and the staff complement 137. The following year, the Advanced Technical Education Amendment Act brought a name change – the Vaal Triangle Technikon – and the opportunity for the new category of higher education institutions to offer and award National Certificates, National Diplomas, National Higher Diplomas and National Masters Diplomas.

By 1987, as new facilities continued to be added to the core institution, student numbers reached 6 000, and nearly 15,000 twelve years later. In 2004, the Vaal University of Technology came into being – and incorporated the old Vista University campus in Sebokeng township which was promptly renamed 'Educity'.

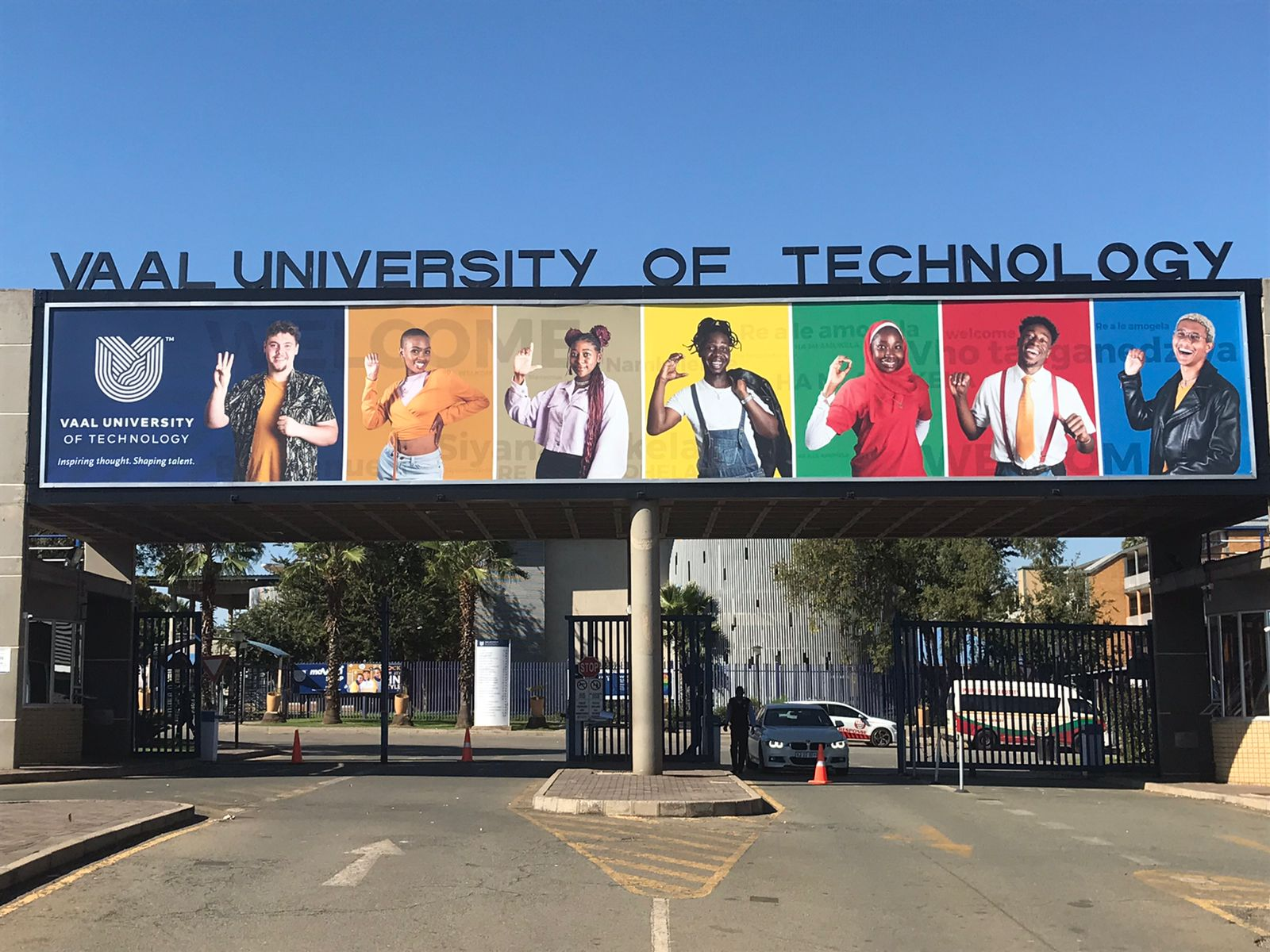
The main entrance of the university

== Academics ==
The 325 academic and research staff are spread across the university's four faculties:

- Applied and Computer Science
- Engineering and Technology
- Humanities
- Management Science

Notable staff members include Prof Peter Dzvimbo the university's current deputy vice chancellor: academic and research.

=== Student enrollment ===
The Vaal University of Technology (VUT) is a contact institution. There were 16,146 contact students enrolled in 2007. Of the student body, 14,693 were full-time students and 1,453 part-time. Of these, 14,781 were South African citizens while 909 were from other SADC countries and 456 from non-SADC countries.

== Notable alumni ==
- Lilian Imuetinyan Salami, academic and current Vice-Chancellor, University of Benin
