= Nile University of Nigeria =

Private research institution in Nigeria

- Motto: Build Your Success For A Better Society
- Type: Private
- Established: 2009; 17 years ago
- Affiliations: Honoris United Universities
- Vice-Chancellor: Dilli Dogo
- Faculty: 698
- Location: Plot 681, Cadastral Zone C-OO, Research & Institution Area, Jabi Airport Bypass, Abuja, FCT, Nigeria; 9.016°N 7.398°E
- Campus: Urban, 279 acres (113 ha)
- Colors: White & blue
- Nickname: Nile Spartans
- Website: https://nileuniversity.edu.ng https://nileuniversity.edu.ng/nile-library

Nile University of Nigeria (NUN) is a private multidisciplinary university established in 2009 and located in Abuja, Nigeria. It is a member of the Honoris United Universities Network and accredited by the National Universities Commission. Currently, it have eight faculties and a School of Postgraduate Studies, offering 34 undergraduate programs and 47 postgraduate programs.

In addition to its standard academic programs, Nile University of Nigeria—through its Centre for Lifelong Learning (CELL)— offers short, on-demand, professional courses that are tailored to the needs of the participants.

In 2020, Nile University joined the Honoris United Universities network becoming one of the 14 member Universities alongside ESPRIT and Université Mundiapolis.

In March 2021, Nile University accepted to partner with the Ministry of Science and Technology in the production of the COVID-19 vaccine.

It ranked as the 3rd best university at the JAMB 5th National Tertiary Admissions Performance Merit Awards in 2025 with a ₦25 million prize. Some other key achievements include the General Medical Council (UK) recognition of their MBBS degree, successful induction of new doctors, and high-ranking,, high-quality research output

== History ==
Nile University of Nigeria, founded in 2009 and sited on a 113-hectare campus got acquired in July 2020 by Actis Capital backed Honoris United Universities becoming one of its member universities alongside educational institutions in countries of Tunisia (IMSET), Morocco (EMSI), Mauritius (Honoris Educational Network), South Africa (Mancosa, Regent Business School) Zimbabwe and Zambia. Nigeria is also the education group's first entry into West Africa. At the time of formation, NILE had three faculties (Arts & Social Sciences, Engineering, and Natural & Applied Sciences) and 93 students. Currently the University has grown to 8 faculties and over 13,000 students In June 2021, the university's logo was changed

The university as a result of structural changes in administration, changes its logo on 21 June 2021.

In a bid to restructure the face of the institution, on June 21, 2021, the university changed it logo to mirror the objectives.

== Administration ==
The university current Principal officers is presented below:

Principal Officers
| S/N | Name | Office |
|---|---|---|
| 1. | Professor Dilli Dogo | Vice-Chancellor |
| 2. | Professor Saleh Abdullahi | Deputy Vice Chancellor (Academics) |
| 3. | Prof. A. Prema Kirubakaran | Deputy Vice Chancellor (Central Admin) |
| 4. | Dr. Fausat Aleshinloye | Ag. Registrar |
| 5. | Prof. Christopher Nkiko | University Librarian |

== Academics ==
The university currently offers undergraduate and postgraduate programs across 7 faculties:

=== Faculty of Engineering ===
- Computer Engineering (B.Eng, PGD, M.Eng, PhD)
- Electrical and Electronics Engineering (B.Eng, PGD, M.Eng, PhD)
- Civil Engineering (B.Eng, PHD, M.Eng)
- Petroleum and Gas Engineering (B.Eng, PGD, M.Eng, PhD)
- Chemical Engineering (B.Eng)
- Mechanical Engineering (B.Eng, M.Eng, PhD)
- Mechatronics Engineering (B.Eng)
- Information communication engineering (B.Eng)
- Oil and Gas Engineering (M.sc

=== Faculty of Sciences ===
- Biology (B.Sc, PGD, M.Sc)
- Biotechnology (B.Sc), M.sc)
- Biochemistry (B.Sc) M.sc)
- Microbiology (B.Sc) M.sc)
- Analytical Chemistry (M.Sc)
- Industrial Chemistry (B.Sc, M.Sc, PhD)

Faculty of Computing

- Software Engineering(B.sc, M.sc, PGD)
- Information Technology(B.sc, M.sc, PGD)
- Information system(B.sc)
- Cyber Security(B.sc)
- Computer Science (B.Sc, PGD, M.Sc, PhD)
- Data Science(B.sc)

=== Faculty of Arts and Social Sciences ===
- Economics (B.Sc, PGD, MSc, M.Phil, PhD)
- Financial Economics (M.Sc)
- Financial Economics (MFE)
- English Language and Communication Studies (B.Sc, MA)
- Peace studies and conflict resolution(B.sc)
- Political Science and International Relations (B.Sc)
- International Relations and Diplomacy (PGD, M.Sc, PhD, Mphil)
- International Relations (MIR)
- Political Science (PGD, M.Sc, PhD, Mphil)
- Peace, Conflict and Strategic Studies (PGD, M.Sc, M.Phil, PhD)
- Mass Communication (B.Sc)
- Criminology and Security Studies (B.Sc)
- Sociology (B.Sc)
- Psychology (B.Sc)

=== Faculty of Management Sciences ===
- Business Administration (B.Sc)
- Master of Business Administration (MBA)
- Management (PGD, MSc, MPhil, PhD)
- Banking and Finance (B.Sc)
- Public Administration (B.Sc)
- Accounting (B.Sc, PGD, M.Sc, P.hD)
- Accounting & Finance (M.Sc)
- Auditing & Forensic Management (M.Sc)
- Logistics and supply chain management(B.sc)
- Estate Management (B.Sc)
- Marketing (B.Sc)
- Entrepreneurship(B.sc)

=== Faculty of Law ===
- Law (LLB)
- Law (PGD)
- Law (LLM)
- Law (PhD)

Faculty of Environmental Sciences

- Architecture (BSc, M.sc, PhD)
- Landscape Architecture
- Urban and Regional Planning (B.Sc)
- Estate Management (B.Sc)
- Building Technology (B.Sc)
- Quantity Survey (B.Sc)

=== College of Health Sciences ===
- Medicine and Surgery (MBBS)
- Public Health (BPH)
- Human Anatomy (BSc)
- Human Physiology (BSc)
- Public Health (MPH)

== Professor Yusuf M. Karodia Library ==
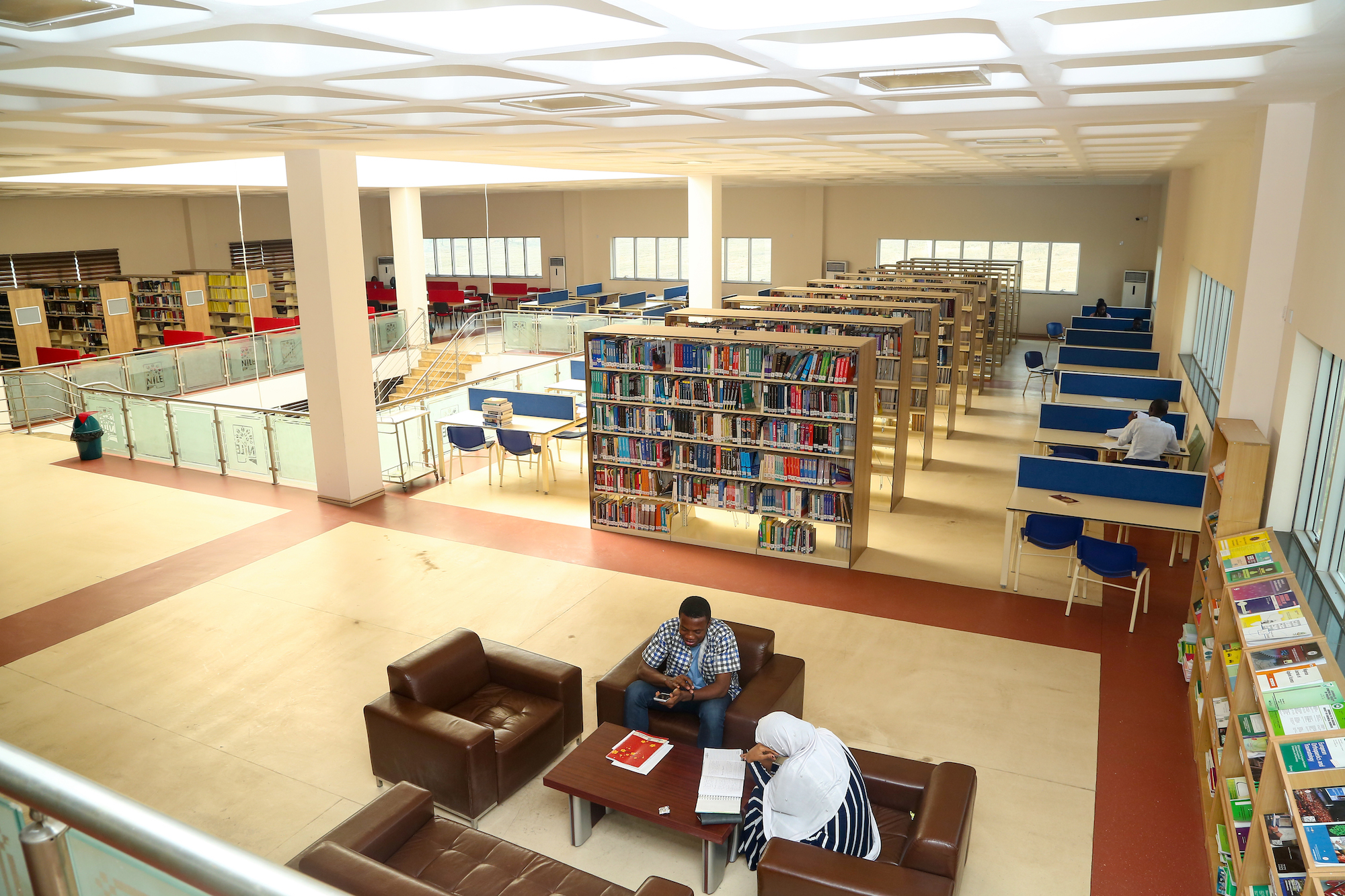

The Nile University of Nigeria Library (Professor Yusuf M. Karodia Library) is an academic library that serves the information needs of staff, students and researchers in the Nile University of Nigeria community. Nile University of Nigeria Library is a hybrid, library with physical and virtual components, that offer an experience to its community patrons for global competitive learning, teaching and research as well as engages in other activities geared towards the objectives of Nile University of Nigeria

The Nile University of Nigeria Library was established in 2009 (the same year the university was established) to support the teaching, learning and research objectives of the university. On November 27, 2024, it was renamed after Professor Yusuf M. Karodia, an educationist and founder of MANCOSA and Regent Business School. The library is located beside the Block B building with over 24,000 volumes of collections (serials inclusive). The library provides information materials in print and electronic formats to serve the needs of staff and students of faculty of arts and social sciences, faculty of management sciences, faculty of sciences, faculty of law, faculty of engineering, faculty of environmental sciences, faculty of computing and college of health science. There is a separate library for the faculty of law students and staff which is located in the faculty of law building of the university as well as the College of Health Sciences Library located at the extension block of the College. The library started with an integrated library management software 'YORDAM' to automate it services but migrated to KOHA ILMS in 2024.The KOHA ILMS has several modules which help in carrying out some of the library services like charging and discharging of users, registration of users, users clearance, cataloguing and library classification of information materials, serials management and among others

The library collections over the years have grown to over 30,000 volumes of monographs and over 1,000,000 electronic resources. The library curate e-books in different disciplines and make them accessible to library users remotely. There are over 7000 volumes of periodicals, including both local and foreign journals. The library also subscribes to research databases for users to access at the e-library section of the library and remotely. These include: Ebscohost, Research4Life, Heinonline, LexisNexis, SCOPUS, Web of Science, ScienceDirect, OnePetro, Proquest, Proquest Ebook Central, SciVal, JSTOR.

The library is currently headed by a University Librarian in person of Prof. Christopher Nkiko. He has over 25 years of experience in managing a University Library. The staff strength of the library include: six Professional Librarians, six Paraprofessional Librarians and 1 Administrative Assistant

Some of the services provided by NUN Library include but not limited to:

- Online reference services and Selective Dissemination of Information
- Circulation services
- Current Awareness services
- Inter-library services
- Information Literacy service
- Reprographic services
- Multimedia services
- Knowledge management services
- Preservation and conservation services
- Archiving services
- Indexing & Abstracting services
- Bibliographic services
- E-library services
- Scholarly Communication
- Plagiarism Checks

== Accreditation ==
The university's degrees are accredited by the Nigerian Universities Commission (NUC) and professional authorities including ICAN, COREN, Council of Legal Education, ARCON and Medical and Dental Council of Nigeria (MDCN). The Faculty of law got approval from the Council of Legal Education (CLE) to run Postgraduate Law programs and admitted first set of postgraduate students in 2022/2023 academic session.

== Inaugural Lecture Series ==
Nile University of Nigeria held her first Inaugural Lecture on July 18, 2024, which was delivered by Prof Titilayo Obilade, a professor of Community Medicine. The title of the inaugural lecture was "Health Messaging: Currency for Today, Savings for Tomorrow". Prof. Obilade drew on her years of experience in academia as well as her work in global health and community service to emphasize the importance of timely and accurate health messages in both preventing health crises in the short term and laying the groundwork for long-term health improvements. The second inaugural lecture was delivered by Prof. Steve A. Adeshina a professor of Computer Vision and Engineering on October 17, 2024. The title of the lecture was "Machine Intelligence vs Human Intelligence: Can Machines Outperform Humans?" The third inaugural lecture was delivered by Prof. Chigozie Enwere a professor of International Relations and Strategic Studies on January 23, 2025. The title of the lecture was "Modern Trends and Issues in African Revolution: A New Perspective in African Politics". The fourth inaugural lecture was delivered by Prof. Abdullahi S.B. Gimba, a renowned scholar in Petroleum and Gas Engineering in May 2025 with the title: “Empowering Society: The Engineer’s Mandate to Innovate in a Disruptive World,” The fifth inaugural lecture was delivered by Engineer Professor Abdulhameed Danjuma Mambo in November 2025. The title of the lecture was: Beyond Concepts and Concrete: Pathways for Advancing Sustainable Buildings and Infrastructure in 21st Century Nigeria. The sixth inaugural lecture was delivered by Professor Prema Kirubakaran, Professor of Artificial Intelligence and Quantum Computing and Deputy Vice-Chancellor (Administration) of the University on Thursday, 29 January 2026. The title of the inaugural lecture is: Navigating the Future of AI in Research: Innovations, Ethics, and Global Impact. The seventh inaugural lecture was delivered by Professor Hauwa Lamino Abubakar, a Professor of Management on Thursday, 7 May 2026. The titles of the inaugural lecture was: Entrepreneurship as a Development Architecture: The Lamino Entrepreneurship Ecosystem Achievement Process (LEEAP) for Emerging Economies.

| S/N | Inaugural Lecturer | Title | Date |
|---|---|---|---|
| 1. | Prof Titilayo Obilade | Health Messaging: Currency for Today, Savings for Tomorrow | July 18, 2024 |
| 2. | Prof. Steve A. Adeshina | Machine Intelligence vs Human Intelligence: Can Machines Outperform Humans? | October 17, 2024 |
| 3. | Prof. Chigozie Enwere | Modern Trends and Issues in African Revolution: A New Perspective in African Politics | January 23, 2025 |
| 4. | Prof. Abdullahi S.B. Gimba | The Engineer’s Mandate to Innovate in a Disruptive World | May 2025 |
| 5. | Engineer Professor Abdulhameed Danjuma Mambo | Beyond Concepts and Concrete: Pathways for Advancing Sustainable Buildings and Infrastructure in 21st Century Nigeria | November 2025 |
| 6. | Professor Prema Kirubakaran | Navigating the Future of AI in Research: Innovations, Ethics, and Global Impact | January 29, 2026 |
| 7. | Professor Hauwa Lamino Abubakar | Entrepreneurship as a Development Architecture: The Lamino Entrepreneurship Ecosystem Achievement Process (LEEAP) for Emerging Economies. | May 7, 2026 |

== Sports & scholarships ==
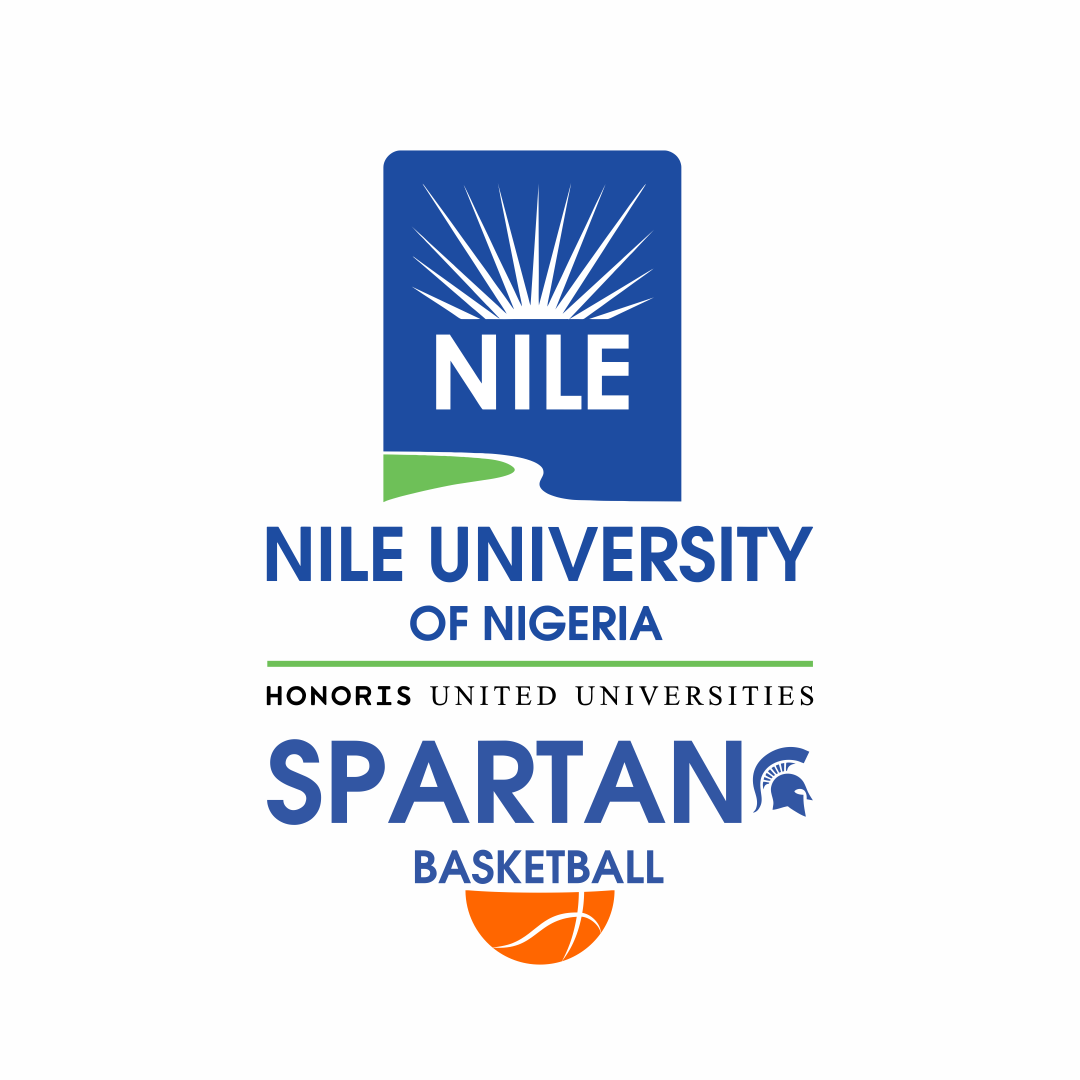
Official basketball team logo

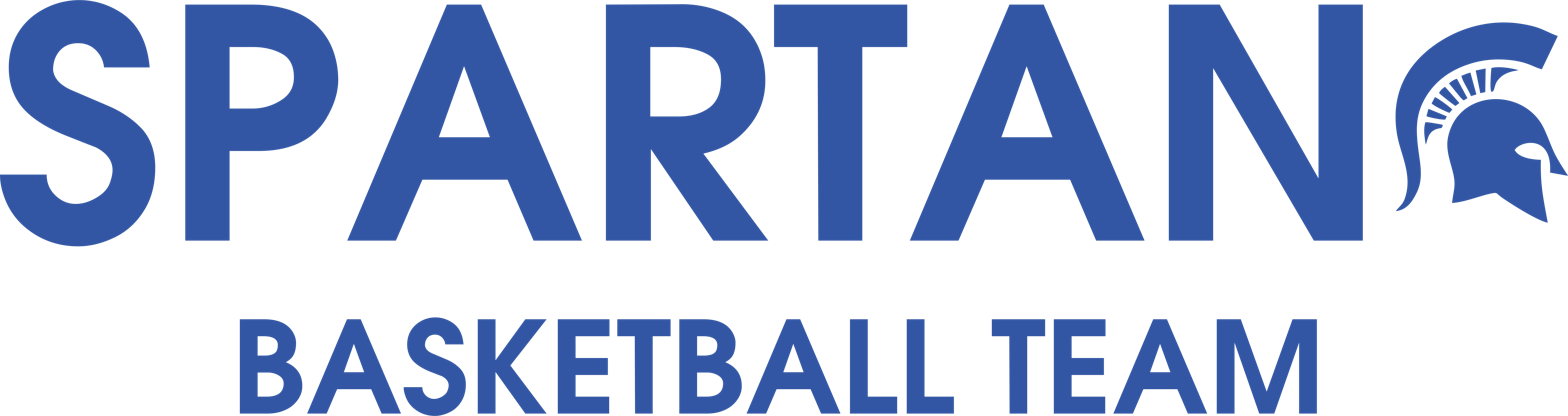
Nile Spartans

Nile University hosts a basketball team called Nile Spartans formed in 2018 which regularly featured in the second tier of the Nigerian National Basketball League and won the prestigious National Division Two in November 2019 and the Sam Ogwuche International Sports Foundation tournament in June 2021.

The team, joined the National Division One league and won the league in 2021.

The university offers full sports scholarships to students with outstanding performance in sports at national or professional level if they participate in the Nile basketball team. There are also partial academic scholarships for students which range from 10% to 100% and are based on students’ performances in the West African Examination Council (WAEC) and Joint Admissions and Matriculation Board (JAMB) exams.

The university's athletes have participated in various major competitions where it won the 2018 West African University Games, the 8th National Swimming Championship (2018) and the World Junior Tennis Tour (2019).

In February 2022, Nile University qualified for the 26th edition of the Nigerian University Games (NUGA) that was held in University of Lagos. It was the first appearance of the university and the sport team came back as the third placed University on the medals table.

=== Student representative council (SRC) ===
Student representative council consists of undergraduate students elected to represent members from their respective academic units. It is led by a President assisted by a vice-president and several other members of the executive committee elected individually.

Campus of Nile University of Nigeria

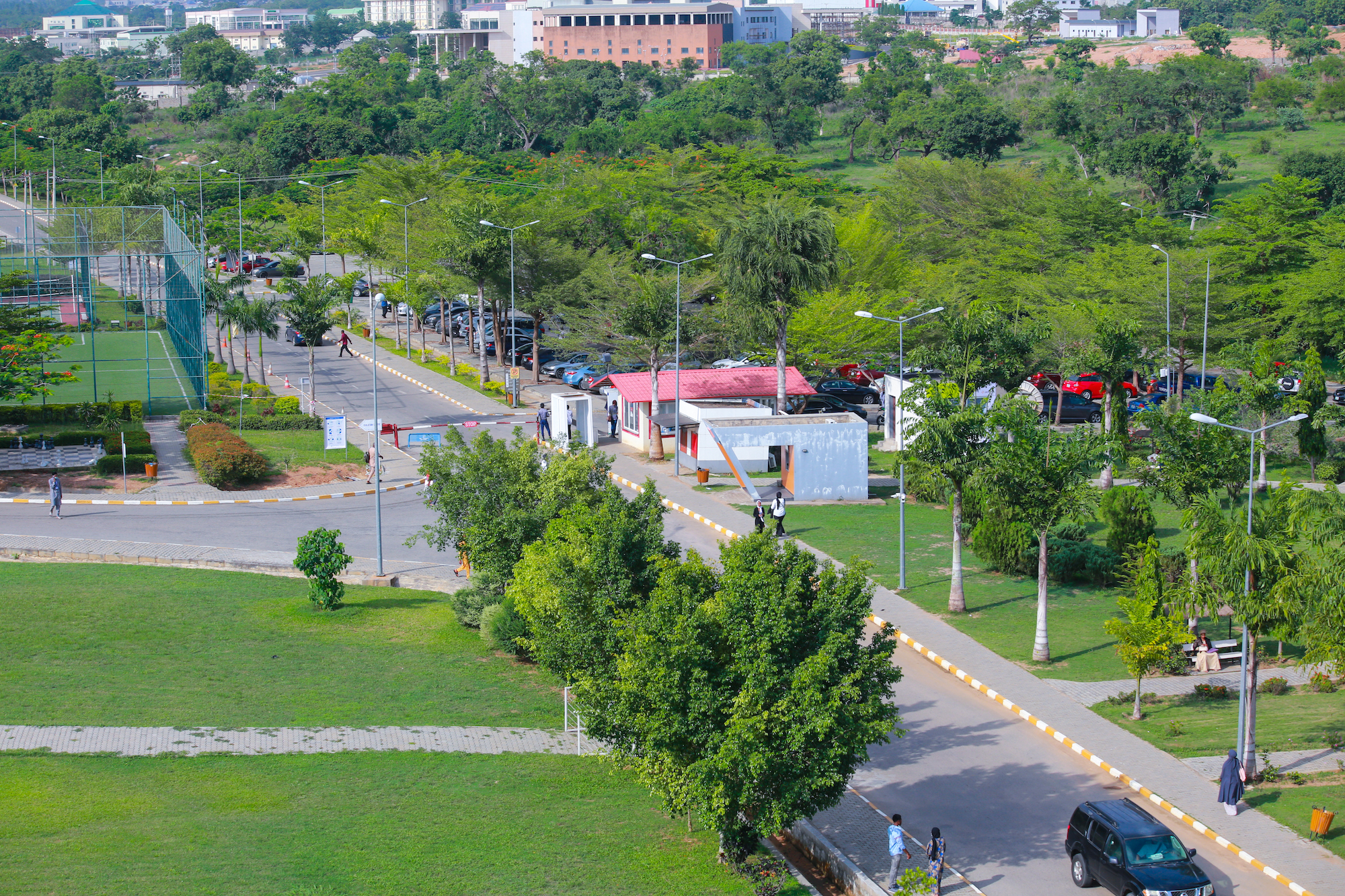
Aerial view of the secondary entrance showing the car park and security post

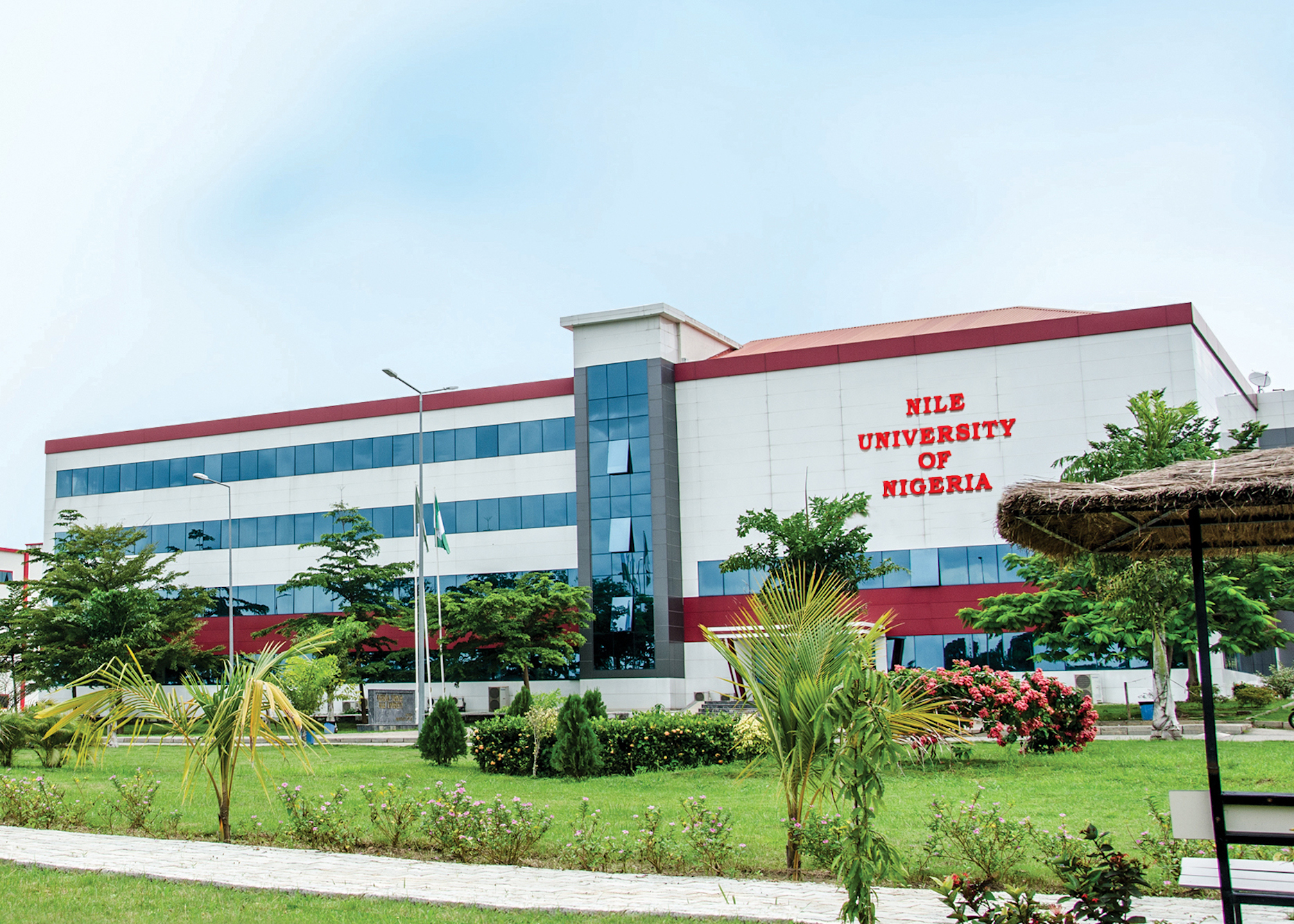
Block A building

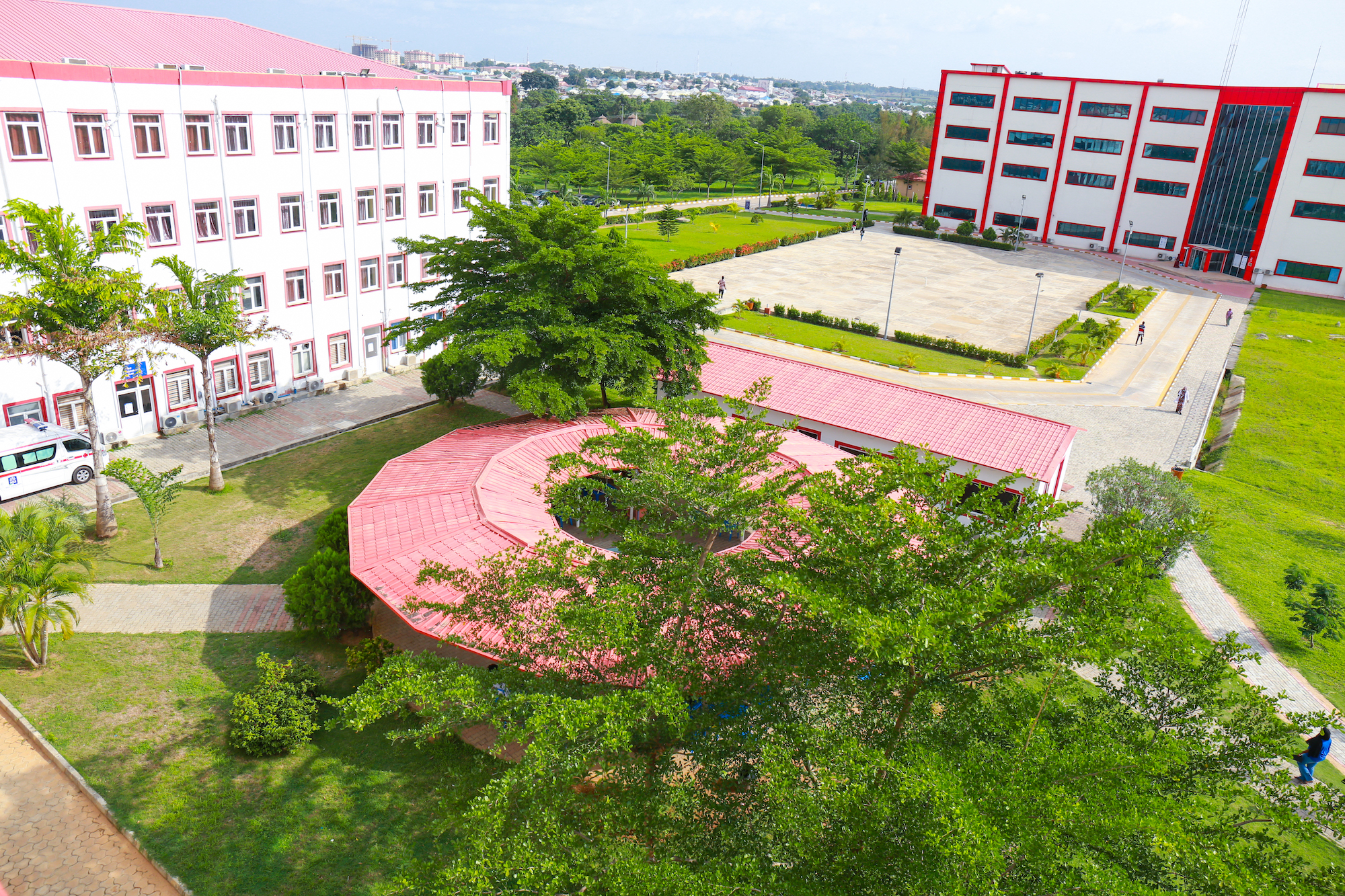
Aerial view showing fountain and minimart with block A&B in the background

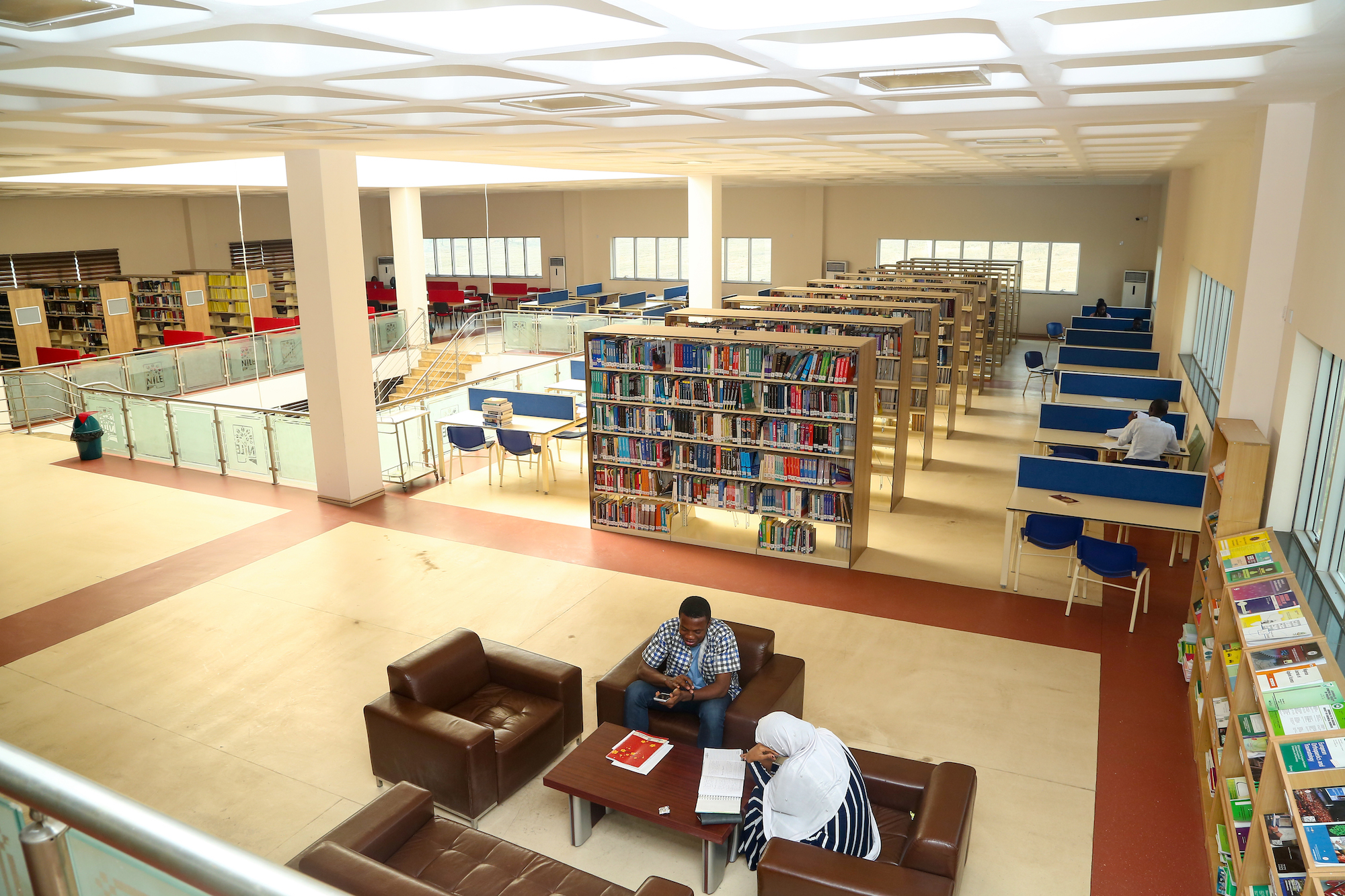
Nile University Library

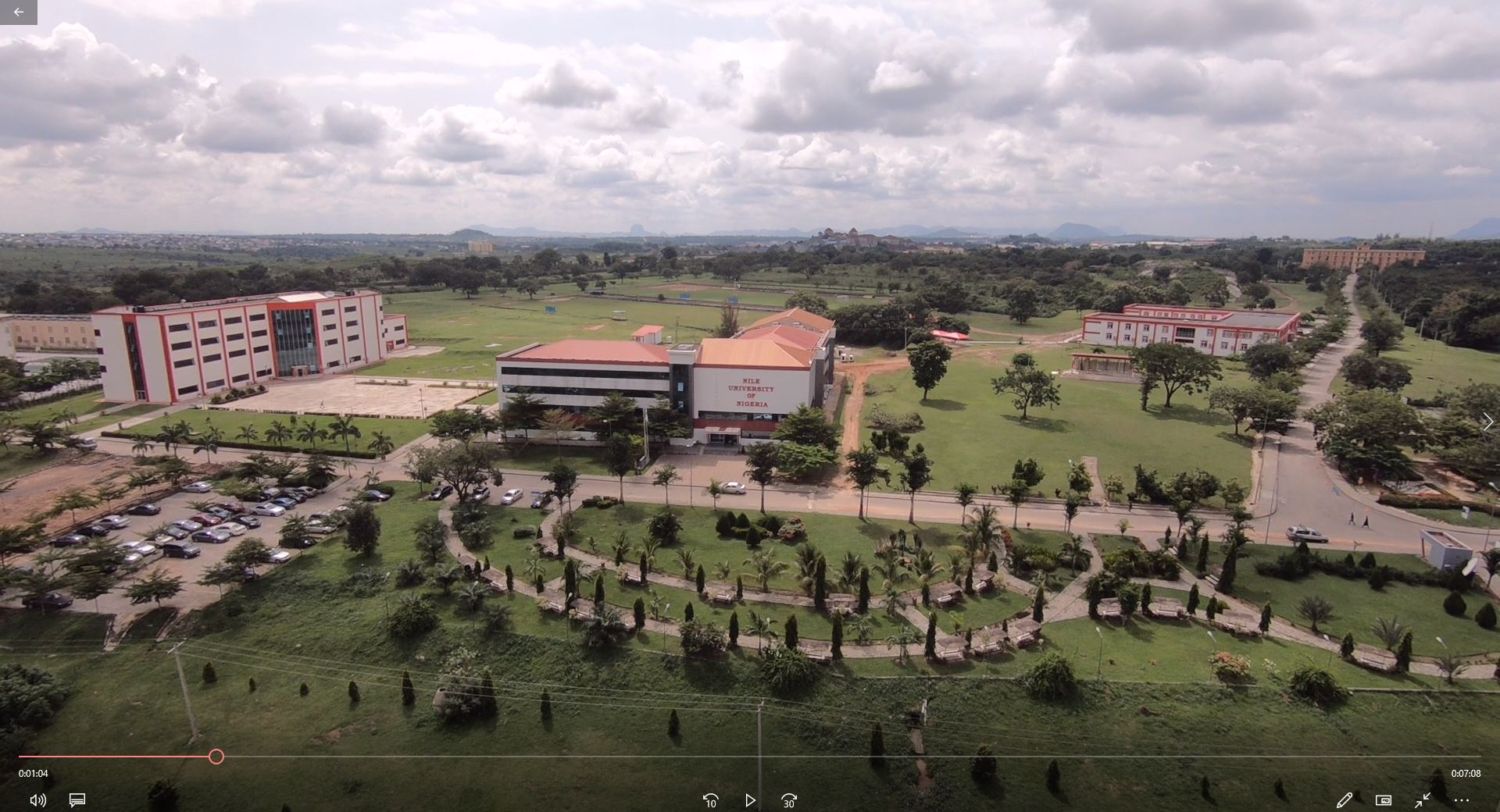
Aerial view of the NILE Campus

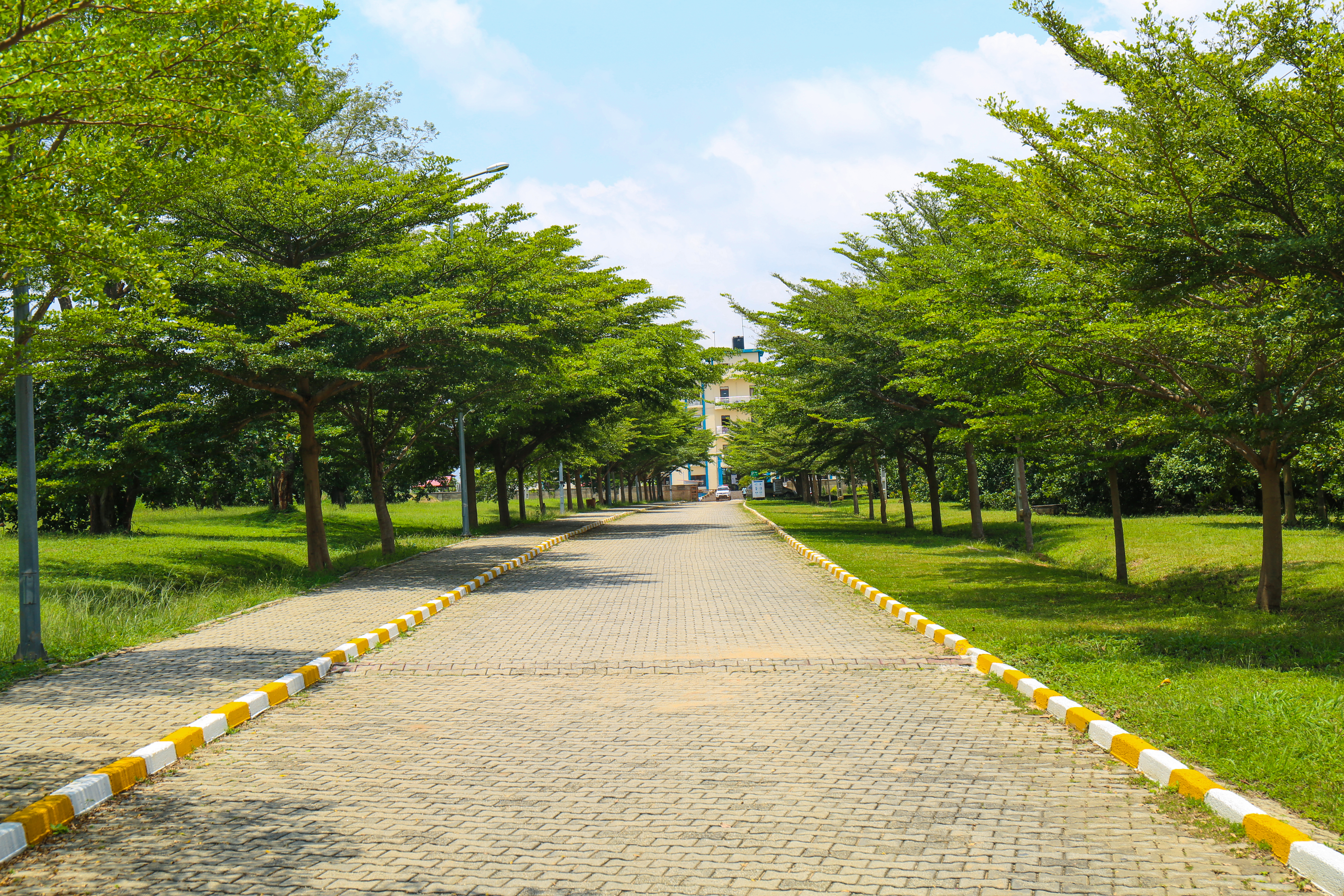
The male students hostel in the far background

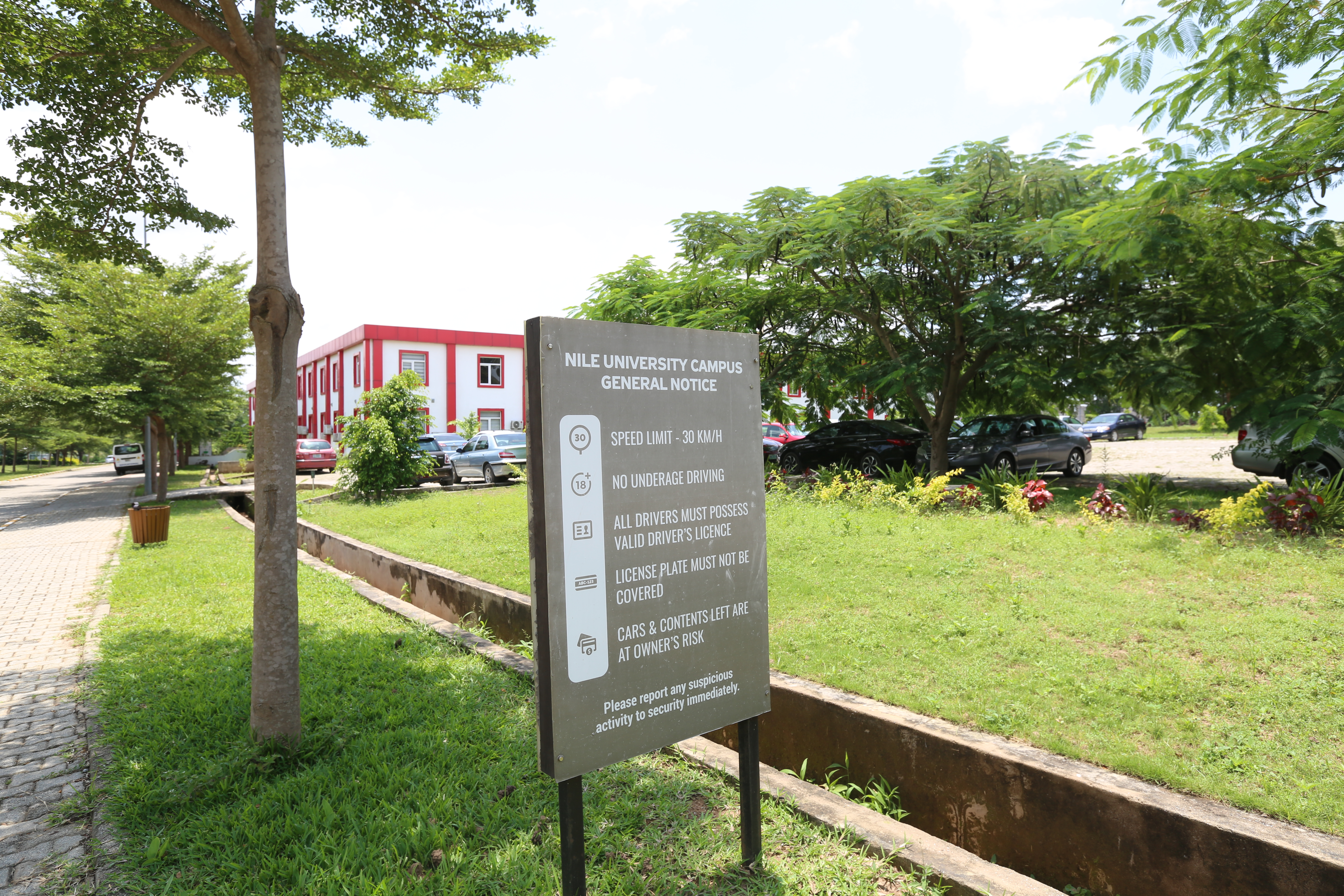

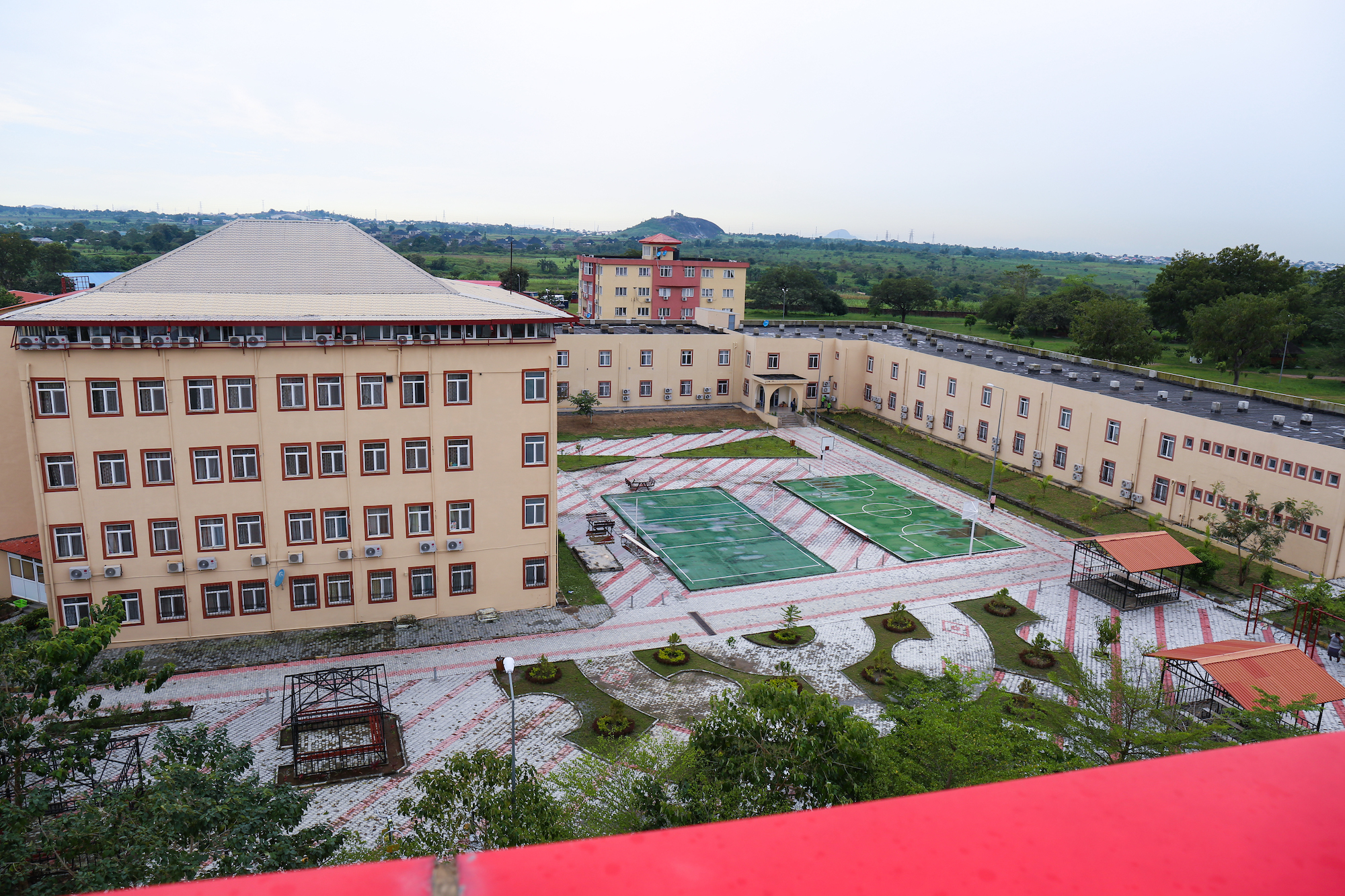
Hostel building

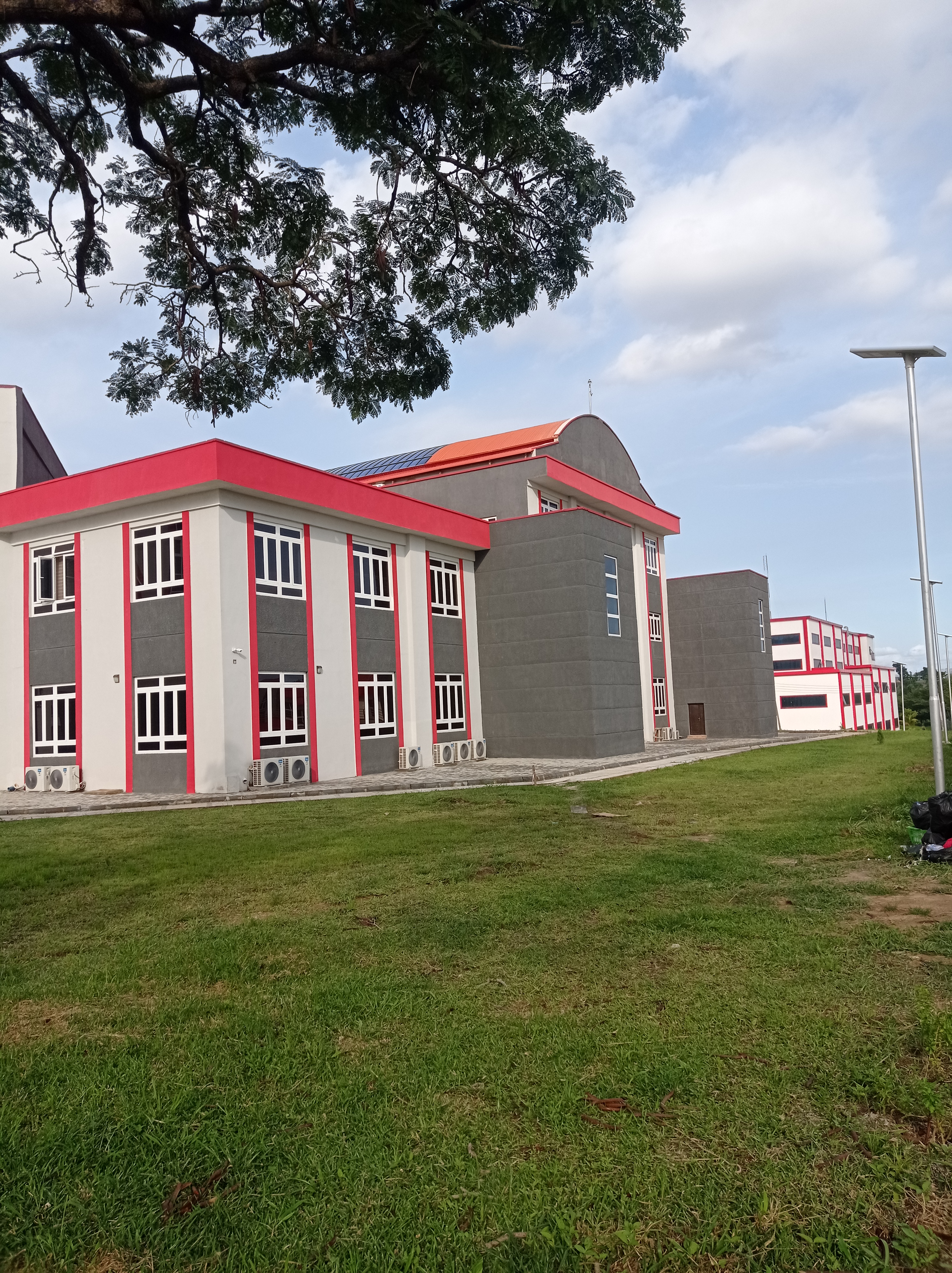
Faculty of Law, Nile University of Nigeria

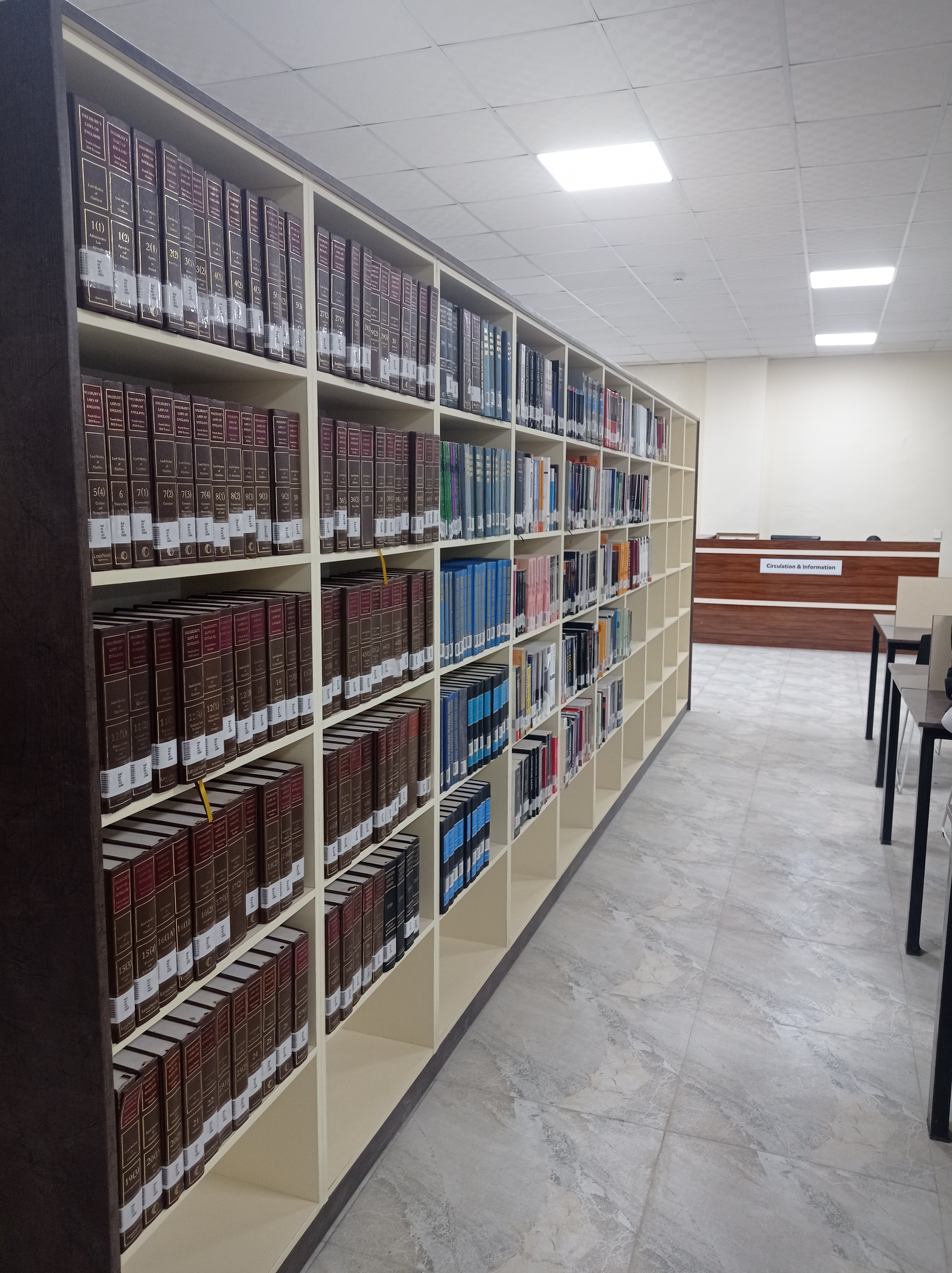
Faculty of Law Library, Nile University of Nigeria

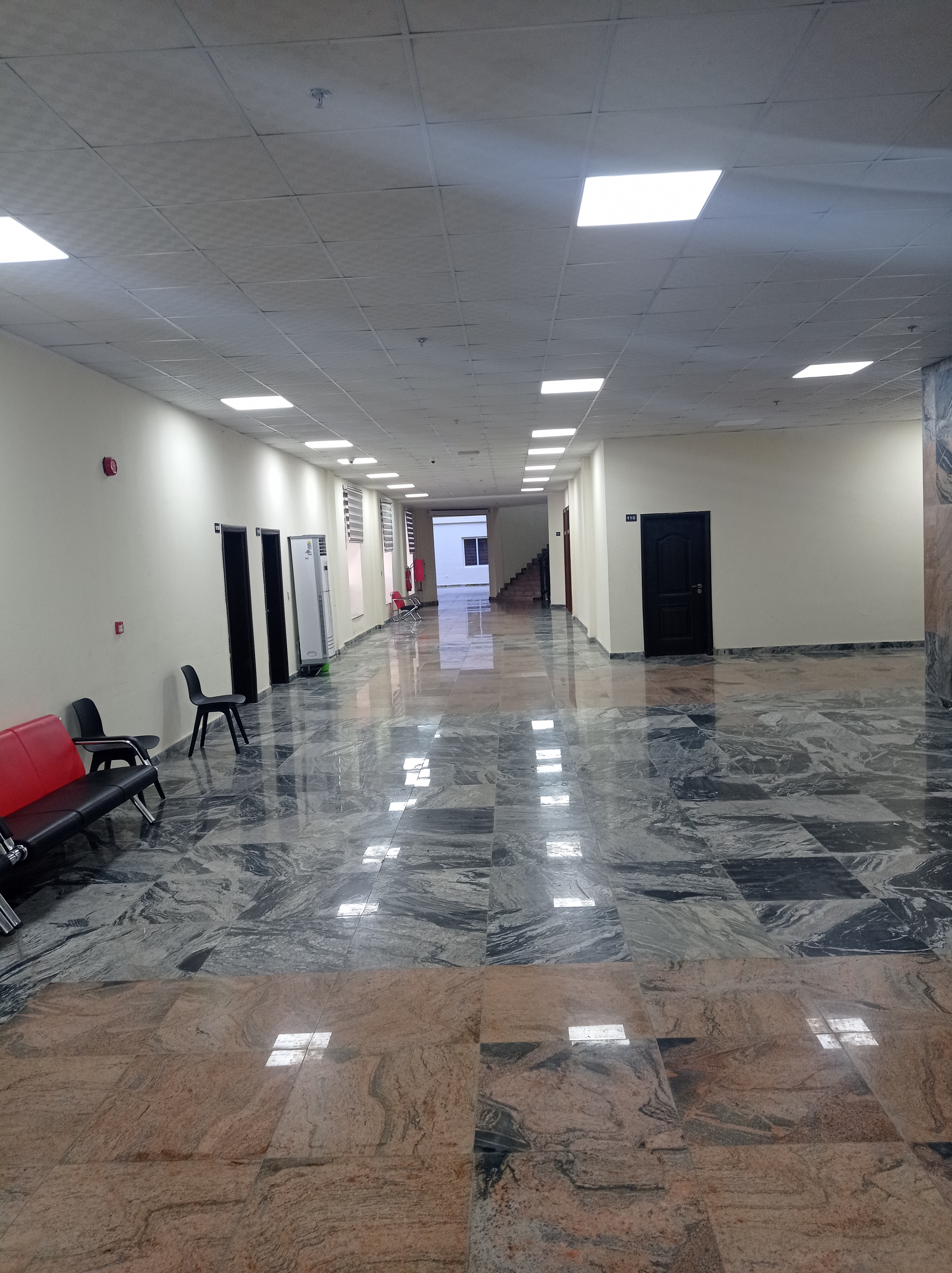
Faculty of Law Corridor

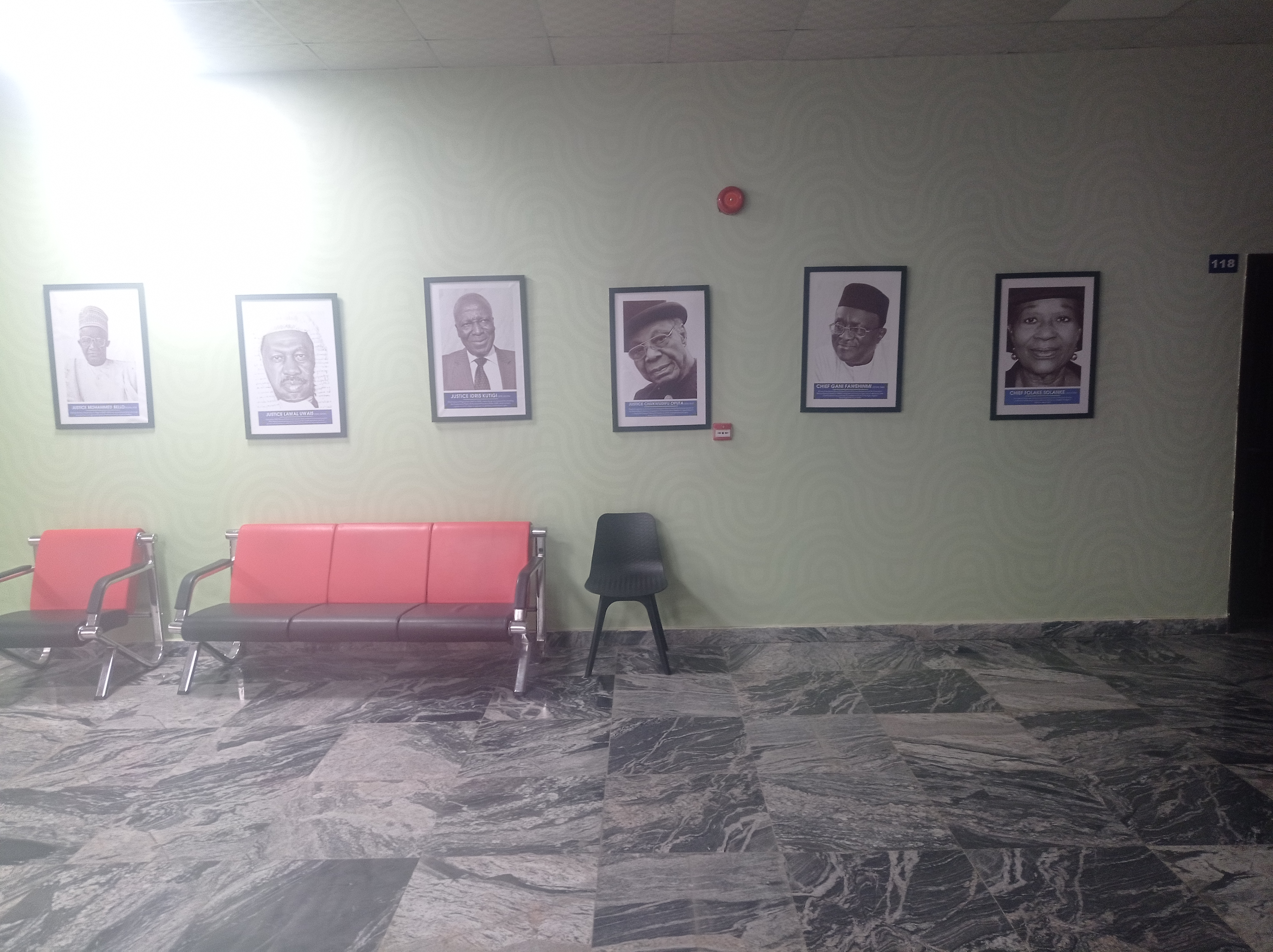
Portraits of Nigeria Law Icons
