= Amine Bensaid =

Moroccan university administrator

- أمين بنسعيد
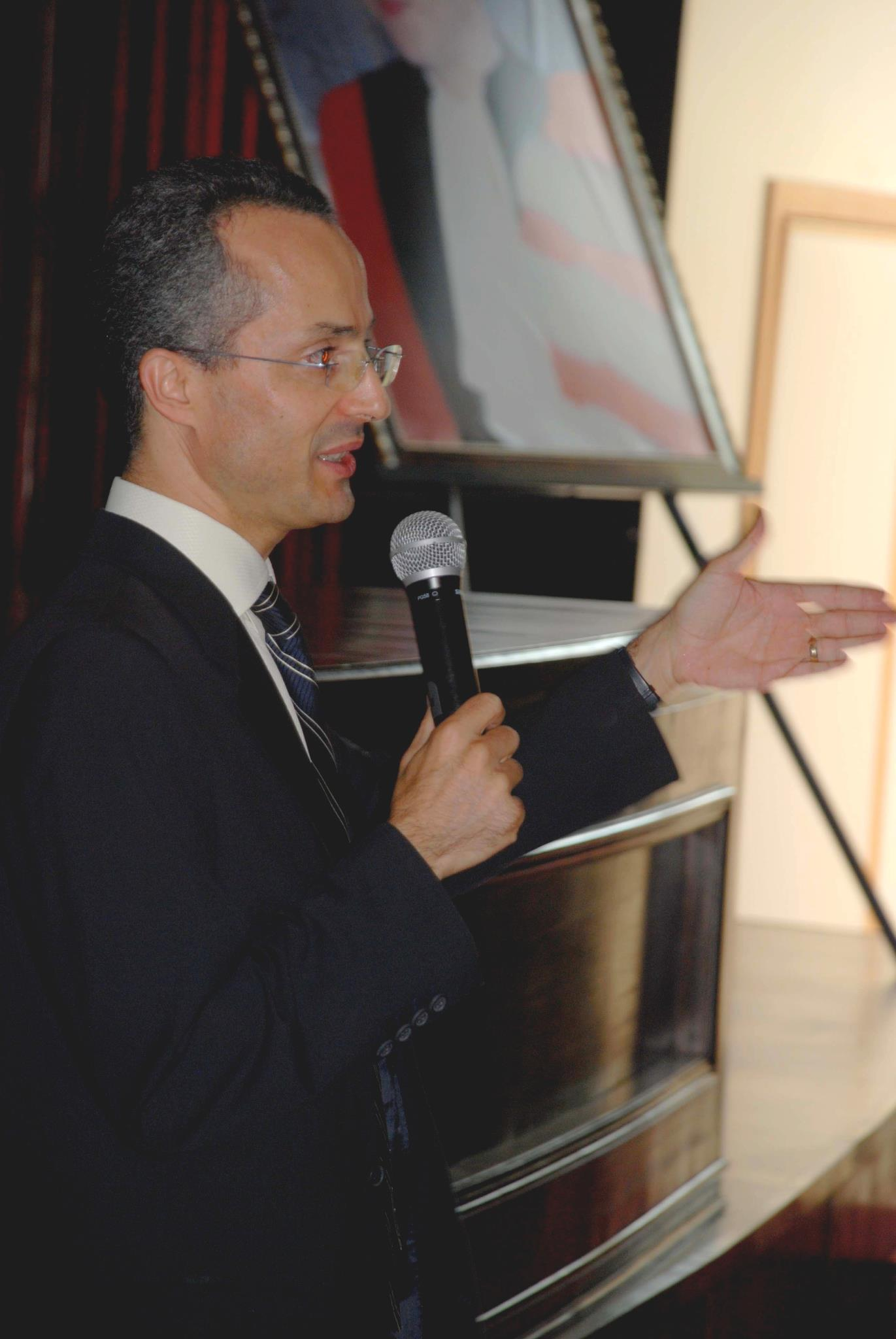
- Amine Bensaid in 2012
- Born: 1968 (age 57–58); Fes, Morocco
- Known for: President of Al Akhawayn University

Academic background
- Education: University of South Florida
- Thesis: Improved fuzzy clustering for pattern recognition with applications to image segmentation (1994)

Academic work
- Discipline: Computer science
- Sub-discipline: Pattern recognition, Data mining
- Institutions: Al Akhawayn University

Amine Bensaid (Arabic: أمين بنسعيد; born in 1968) is a Moroccan computer scientist and academic, president of Al Akhawayn University in Ifrane. His areas of specialization have included pattern recognition, machine learning, image processing, fuzzy logic, neural networks and genetic algorithms, and their applications to magnetic resonance imaging, data mining, web mining, and Arabic IT, fields in which he is author of influential publications. He was also president of Université Mundiapolis in Casablanca between 2011 and 2019. Since 2017, he has also been chairman of the board of the Moroccan-American Commission for Educational and Cultural Exchange (MACECE), which administers the Fulbright Program in Morocco.

== Early life and education ==
Bensaid was born in Fes, Morocco in 1968, and graduated high school in this city in 1986. He studied at the University of South Florida between 1988 and 1994, from which he received a BS in information systems in 1990, an MS in computer engineering in 1992, and a PhD in computer science and engineering in 1994. He also became a member of Phi Kappa Phi, Golden Key, and Tau Beta Pi honor societies.

== Academic career ==
Amine Bensaid started his academic career at Al Akhawayn University in 1994, where he became head of the department of computer science in 1998, dean of the school of science and engineering in 2001, and vice-president for academic affairs and research in 2007. In 1999 he was also a Fulbright scholar and visiting professor at Carnegie Mellon University. He was also president of Université Mundiapolis in Casablanca between 2011 and 2019, and a member of the academic council of Honoris United Universities, a private pan-African higher education network. In 2017, Bensaid was appointed chairman of the board of the Moroccan-American Commission for Educational and Cultural Exchange (MACECE), succeeding Hassan Mekouar, former rector of Mohammed the First University in Oujda. In November 2019 he was appointed by the King of Morocco president of Al Akhawayn University, thus succeeding Driss Ouaouicha, who had been appointed minister-delegate for higher education and scientific research.

== Selected publications ==
- Bensaid, A., Hall, L.O., Bezdek, J.C., Clarke, L.P., Silbiger, M.L., Arrington, J.A., & Murtagh, F.R. (1996). Validity-guided (re)clustering with applications to image segmentation. IEEE Trans. Fuzzy Systems, 4, 112-123.
- Kourdi, M.E., Bensaid, A., & Rachidi, T. (2004). Automatic Arabic Document Categorization Based On The Naive Bayes Algorithm. Semitic '04 Proceedings of the Workshop on Computational Approaches to Arabic Script-based Languages, 51-58.
- Bensaid, A., Hall, L.O., Bezdek, J.C., & Clarke, L.P. (1996). Partially supervised clustering for image segmentation. Pattern Recognition, 29, 859-871.
- Hall, L.O., Bensaid, A., Clarke, L.P., Velthuizen, R.P., Silbiger, M.L., & Bezdek, J.C. (1992). A comparison of neural network and fuzzy clustering techniques in segmenting magnetic resonance images of the brain. IEEE transactions on neural networks, 3 5, 672-82.

== Other roles and contributions ==
Amine Bensaid has also been an advisor to MAScIR, a national initiative led by the ministry of industry, trade and new technologies, to develop a market-oriented scientific and technological research platform in Morocco, president of the Moroccan Fulbright Alumni Association (MFAA), and chairman of the scientific and educational council and later vice-president of Anwaar, a non-profit association that supports the education of promising Moroccan students in science and technology.
