= Honoris United Universities =

African private higher education group

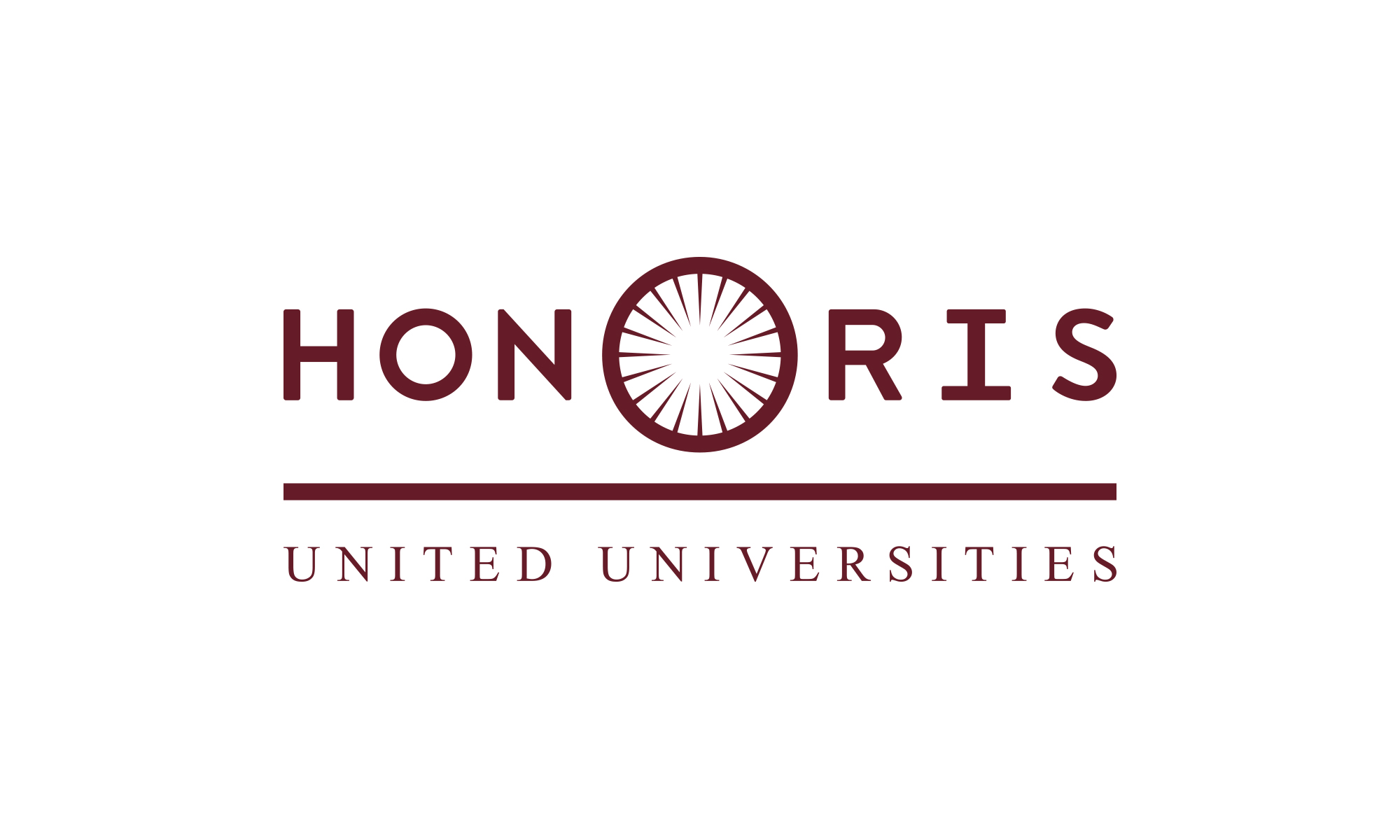
- Type: Private
- Industry: Education
- Founded: 2017; 9 years ago
- Key people: Jonathan Louw chief executive officer; Luis Lopez non-executive chairman
- Owner: Actis Capital
- Website: honoris.net

Honoris United Universities (HUU), is a group specialising in private higher education and professional education on the African continent. It owns several higher-learning institutions in Morocco, Nigeria, Tunisia and South Africa. The group is run by a board and an academic council and led by a chief executive officer. As of 2021, the Honoris network consists of 14 private higher-learning institutions in 10 countries and 32 cities with 57,000 students.

In 2017, Actis Capital announced the launch of Honoris United Universities as an educational group in which it was investing $275 million. The group announced Luis Lopez as its chief executive officer. He was made a non-executive chairman in January 2021 and Jonathan Louw became the new CEO.

== History ==
=== Founding ===
In 2014, Actis entered into an agreement with Université Centrale Group, a post-secondary education group in Tunisia, to build a higher-education platform. Slah Ben Turkia became the first CEO of the platform. By 2016, the group expanded into Morocco by incorporating Université Mundiapolis. In 2017, the group made its first foray into anglophone Africa, partnering with both Management College of Southern Africa (MANCOSA) and Regent Business School. In that same year, Honoris United Universities was established and began recruitment of management staff with Luis Lopez appointed as CEO.

In May 2018, Honoris partnered with the European Business School (ESCP Europe) for the purpose of sharing knowledge and resources as well as providing scholarships and financial aid to students admitted by the latter institution. In 2019, Honoris launched MANCOSA School of Education and in 2021, partnered with Le Wagon to open coding bootcamps across the continent as part of its expansion into Africa.

In 2021, the network announced work on a potential entry in Egypt.

== Schools and subsidiaries ==
=== South Africa ===
Management College of Southern Africa (MANCOSA)

- Management College of Southern Africa (2017)
- Regent Business School (2017)
- Red and Yellow Creative School of Business (2020)
- FEDISA, Fashion School (2022)
- The Animation School (2024)

=== Morocco ===
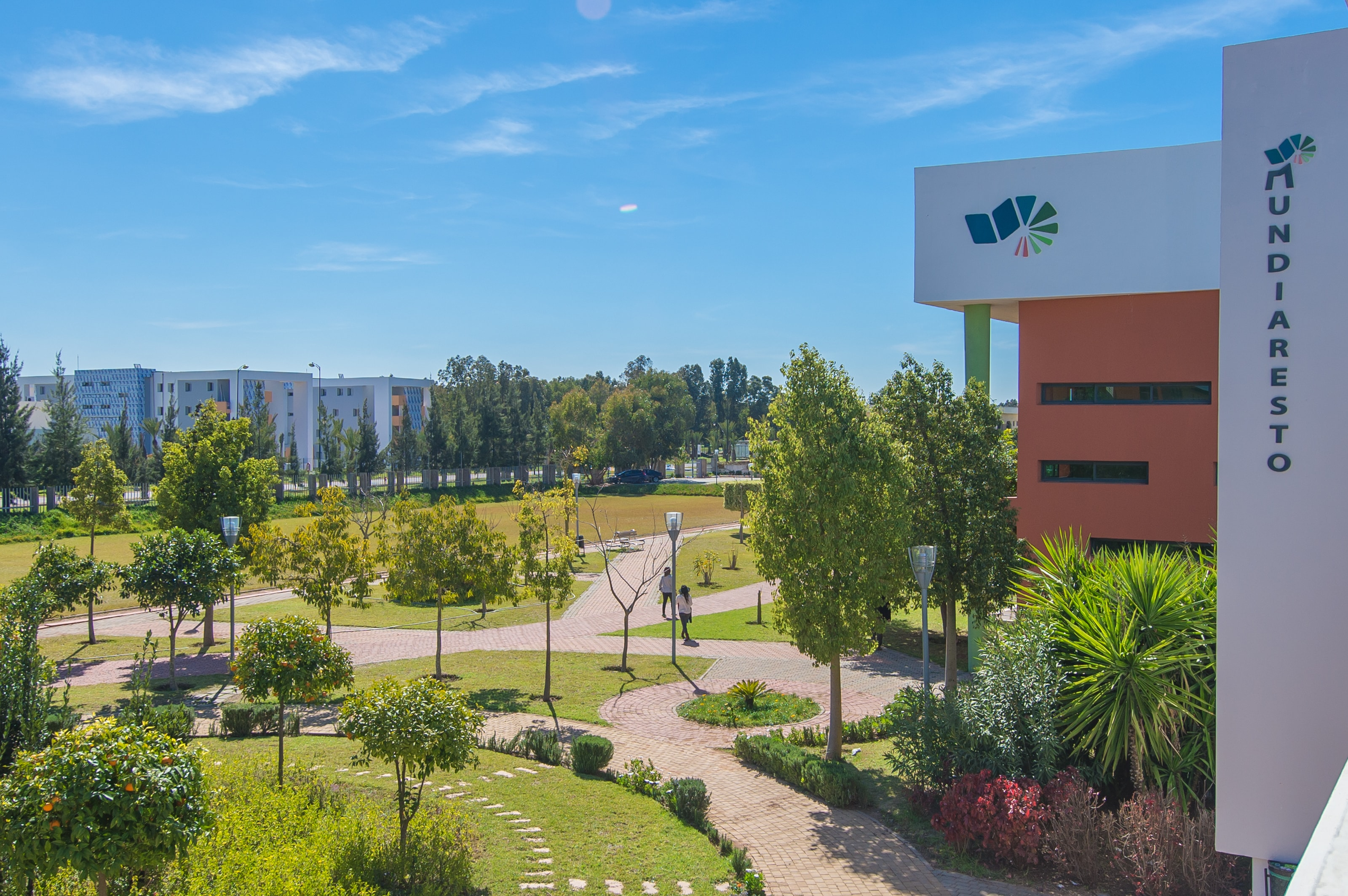
Mundiapolis campus, Morocco

- Mundiapolis University (2017)
- École Marocaine des Sciences de l’Ingénieur (EMSI) (2018)
- École d’Architecture de Casablanca (EAC) (2018)

=== Nigeria ===
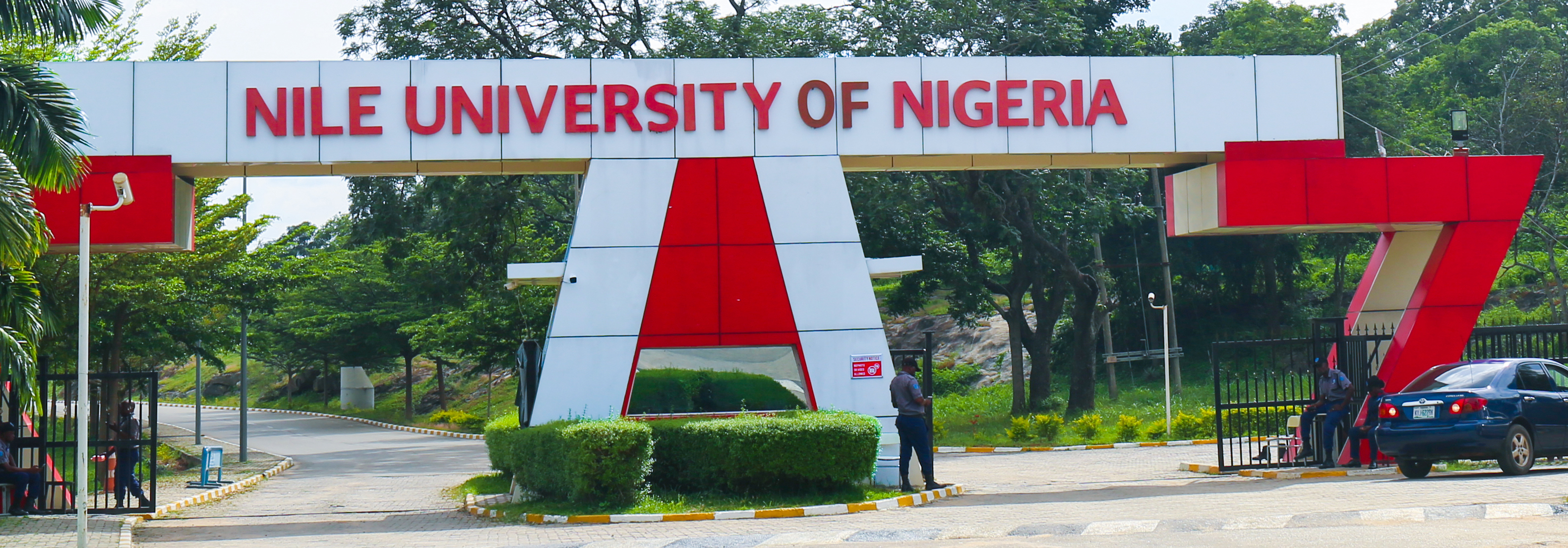
Entrance of Nile campus, Nigeria

- Nile University of Nigeria

=== Mauritius ===
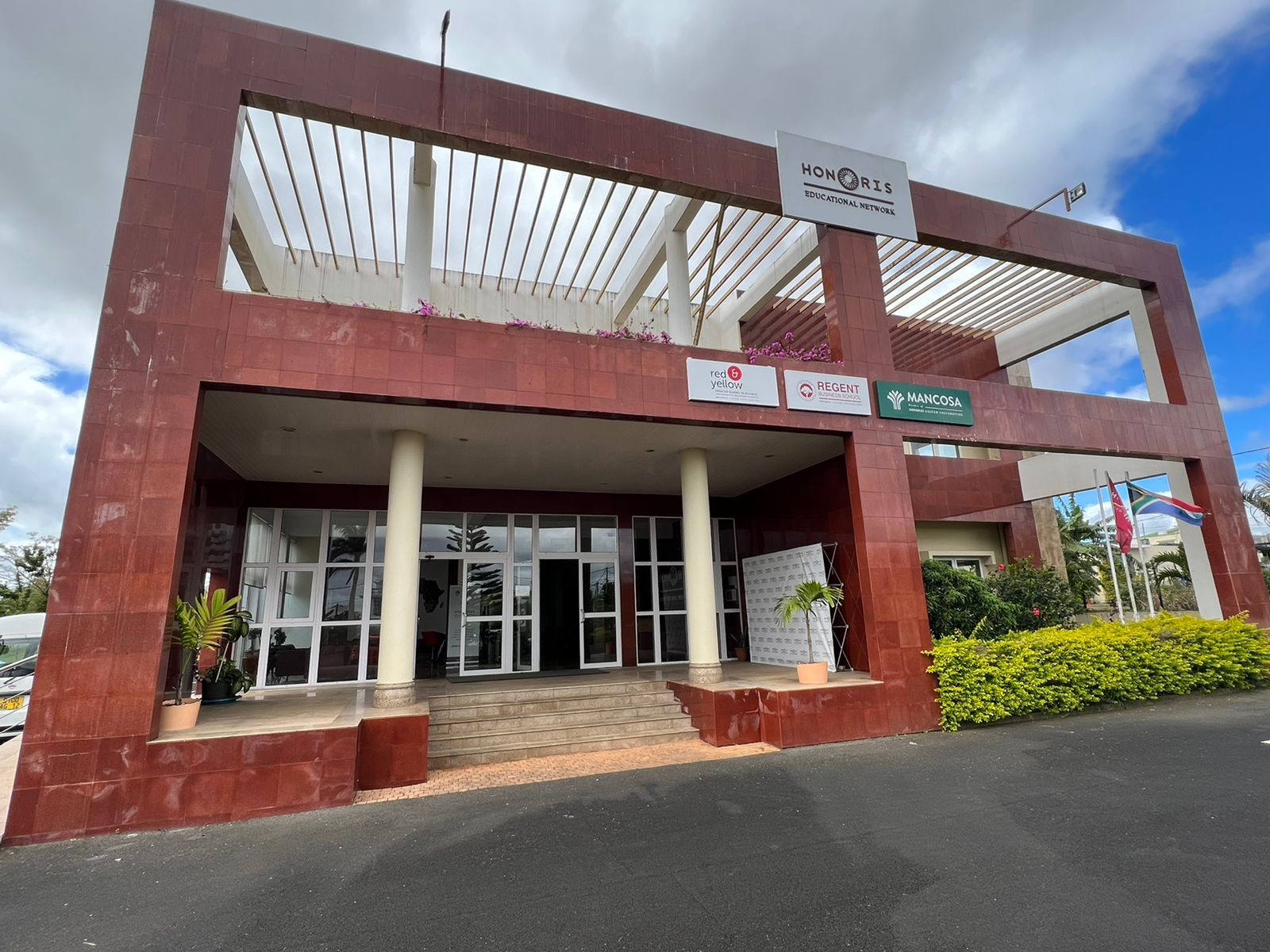
Honoris in Mauritius

- Honoris Education Network, formerly YKBS (2019)

=== Tunisia ===
- L’Université Centrale (2017)
- Faculté des Sciences de la Santé (UPSAT) (2018)
- Honoris Medical Simulation Center (2018)
- UPSAT (2018)
- École supérieure privée d'ingénierie et de technologie - ESPRIT (2020)

==== Professional training centre ====
- Institut Maghrebin des Sciences Economiques et de Technologie (IMSET)
- Académie d’Art de Carthage (AAC)

== See also ==
- Actis Capital
- Mancosa
- Nile University of Nigeria
