= NTNU =

NTNU may refer to:

- National Taiwan Normal University, Taipei, Taiwan
- Nigerian Turkish Nile University, Abuja, Nigeria
- Norwegian University of Science and Technology (Norges teknisk-naturvitenskapelige universitet), Trondheim, Ålesund and Gjøvik, Norway
