= Actis Capital =

British investment firm focused on the private equity

Actis LLP
- Type: Private
- Industry: Infrastructure; Emerging markets
- Predecessor: CDC Group
- Founded: 2004; 22 years ago
- Headquarters: London, SE1 United Kingdom
- AUM: $14.1 billion (2024)
- Owner: General Atlantic
- Number of employees: c.250
- Website: act.is

Actis LLP is a global investment firm focused on sustainable infrastructure, in particular the energy, infrastructure, and real estate asset classes.

The company is focused on investments in emerging markets in India, Latin America, South East Asia, the Middle East, Central and Eastern Europe, Africa and China.

Actis was formed in July 2004, as a spinout of CDC Group plc (formerly the Commonwealth Development Corporation), an organization established by the UK Government in 1948 to invest in developing economies in Africa, Asia, and the Caribbean. The Actis management team acquired majority ownership of CDC's emerging markets investment platform.

The firm was acquired by General Atlantic in 2024.

== History ==
Actis was founded in 2004 as a spinout from CDC Group, the UK's development finance institution, when a 60% stake in the firm was sold to CDC managers and staff for a total consideration of £373,000. The new company was given a five-year 'umbrella' guarantee that it would continue to manage all CDC's existing overseas investments totalling US$900 million in CDC funds. According to the UK's Department for International Development, the price was agreed after a valuation by financial advisers KPMG. Under the 2004 deal that created Actis, if the company was to be sold on the open market within 10 years, 80% of the profits and proceeds would go back to the government.

In 2007, UK prime minister Gordon Brown came under scrutiny over the sell-off of Actis after it became apparent that the formerly government-owned business had made millions of pounds for its former employees.

On 1 May 2012 the Secretary of State for International Development, Andrew Mitchell, announced that the state's remaining 40% stake had been sold to Actis management for an initial £8m. The deal also included a share of future profits that had the potential to be worth over £62m.

In March 2019, Actis was named "Impact Investment Firm of the Year" at the 2018 Private Equity International Awards. The firm also placed second in the Energy Private Equity category, behind I Squared Capital.

In April 2019, following an industry-wide trend towards more transparency in impact investing, the firm launched the "Actis Impact Score", an open-source framework that seeks to consistently measure impact from investment to investment, thus permitting comparison across different asset classes or geographies, as well as tracking its evolution over the holding period.

In May 2022, Actis announced the closure of its Cape Town and Nairobi offices, with their services being taken over by their Johannesburg, Cairo and Lagos offices. As of 2024, Actis has 17 offices globally.

In March 2023, Actis announced portfolio-wide net zero targets, committing to align 60% of its total AUM with Net Zero by 2030, to have at least 50% of its AUM in 2030 to be invested in climate solutions, and that it intends for all portfolio companies to develop Board-approved Net Zero Plans within two years post investment. This followed an earlier commitment in 2022 to align 100% of its investment portfolio to Net Zero by 2050, which saw the firm become a signatory to Net Zero Asset Managers (NZAM) initiative.

In January 2024, General Atlantic agreed to acquire Actis. The acquisition finalised in October, after which Actis became General Atlantic's sustainable infrastructure arm.

=== Controversy ===
In July 2023, Actis faced an impending bankruptcy of Energy of Cameroon (Eneo), of which it held a 51% stake and announced its intention to start arbitration if no other solution could be agreed on.

== Investments ==
In August 2013, Actis acquired the South African firm Transaction Capital's payment services unit, Paycorp, for US$95 million. Actis exited the investment in 2022.

In October 2013, the firm announced it had invested US$48 million in the Indian pharmaceuticals company Symbiotec Pharmalab for a "significant stake". Actis exited the investment in 2018.

In July 2017, Actis announced investing $275 million in the education sector in Africa. The investment is made through the creation of Honoris United Universities, a network of institutions, including Mancosa and Regent Business School in South Africa.

In mid 2018, following the crisis and subsequent collapse of The Abraaj Group, Actis moved to acquire and assume management of Abraaj's Middle East and North Africa funds. While other players were interested and placed competing bids, including higher offers from firms based in the Persian Gulf, Actis was ultimately preferred by investors to take over the funds due to its emerging-markets expertise and operations-focused investment rationale, as well as in interest of a block deal that encompassed all underlying assets.

In July 2019, after a complex, multiyear process, it was announced that Actis had secured management rights to Abraaj Private Equity Fund IV and Abraaj Africa Fund III, totaling $2.99 billion of assets under management and 14 portfolio companies. The transaction also included around 25 junior employees formerly employed by Abraaj. Commenting on the deal, Actis' Chief Investment Officer stated it was a response after "a number of investors asked us to step in to be part of a solution in mid-2018". With the transaction, Actis reached $12 billion under management and 250 employees globally.

In August 2019, the firm reached final close for the Actis Long Life Infrastructure Fund (ALLIF), raising $1.23 billion in committed capital. The 15-year, brownfield- and yield-focused, core infrastructure vehicle represents a strategic shift for Actis, which has historically targeted buy-and-build investments via its flagship energy funds. Despite this shift, the first two deployments for ALLIF were within renewable energy generation - a 110MW PV solar plant in Chile acquired from SunPower in 2018, and a 137MW wind farm in Brazil sold by EDP Renováveis in 2019 for R$598 million.

In 2022, Actis acquired controlling stake in Yellow Door Energy, a Dubai-based solar provider company; invested in Indian renewables platform BluPine Energy, targeting 4GW capacity of utility scale solar, wind and storage projects (backed by up to US$800 million of capital); backed Southeastern Europe renewables business Rezolv Energy; and invested in Southeast Asia renewables platform Levanta Renewables.

In March 2023, Actis sold its stake in Lekela Power, Africa's largest pure-play renewable energy independent power producer in Africa’s biggest renewable energy deal, and later in the year sold its stake in BTE Renewables, the continent's second largest renewables player.

In February 2023, Actis partnered with EnCap to invest in Catalyze, targeting a build-out of around 600MW capacity of solar and battery storage. In May 2023, Actis launched Nozomi, investing $500 million in this platform for renewable energy in Japan. In August 2023, Actis acquired a portfolio of Latin American and US data centers for US$35 million.

In 2024, Actis acquired a telecom tower portfolio in the Western Balkans, branded as ConnectisTower; a portfolio of operational hybrid annuity model road assets in India; an operational energy transmission asset totalling 743 km; and a 2.2GW diversified generation platform from Enel Generación Perú, taking over one of Peru's largest diversified generation portfolios. The firm also launched a new Asian data centre platform, Epoch Digital.

In April 2024, Actis and Fortescue were awarded rights to develop major green hydrogen project in Oman, with the potential to produce up to 200,000 tonnes of green hydrogen per year. In September 2024, Actis signed to invest in the world’s largest integrated renewables and energy storage project in the Philippines (when fully commissioned, as measured by battery energy storage capacity).

== Divestments ==
In September 2019, Actis sold Atlantic Energias Renováveis and its operating 642MW wind power portfolio to China General Nuclear (CGN) for a reported figure of c. R$4 billion, or roughly six-to-seven times its initial investment. Actis benefited from being one of the early movers into renewable energy generation in Brazil, reaching the status of joint-largest wind operator in the country with platform companies Atlantic and Echoenergia.

In January 2023, Actis disposed of its 15% stake in Singapore based, Indorama Eleme Fertilisers and Chemicals, a sub-Saharan producer of urea, to Indorama Corporation which already held 85% and regained full control of its stakes. In June 2023, Actis sold the South African renewable energy developer BTE Renewables to French companies Engie and Meridiam.
