= Bracewell LLP =

International law firm

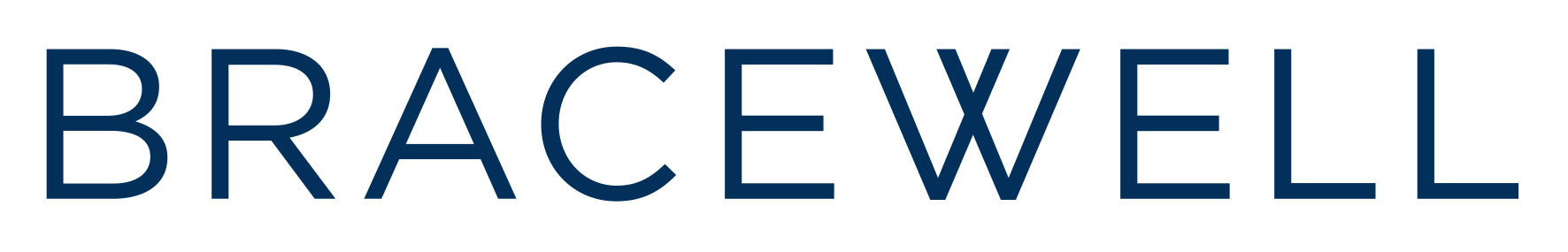
- Headquarters: Pennzoil Place; Houston, Texas
- No. of offices: 10
- No. of attorneys: 350 (2020)
- Major practice areas: Corporate & Securities, Energy, Environmental Strategies, Finance, Government Relations, Healthcare, Infrastructure, Litigation, Tax, Technology
- Key people: Greg Bopp (Managing Partner)
- Revenue: $295 million (2020)
- Date founded: 1945
- Company type: Limited liability partnership
- Website: Bracewell.com

Bracewell LLP is an international law firm based in Houston, Texas, that began in 1945. The firm has approximately 350 lawyers and has offices across the United States in New York City, Washington, D.C., San Antonio, Seattle, Dallas, and Austin, as well as international offices in Dubai, Paris, and London.

The firm works primarily in the energy, infrastructure, finance, technology, healthcare, and real estate sectors, with practices in transactional, litigation, regulatory and government relations matters.

== History ==
The firm was founded on November 1, 1945, when J. S. Bracewell and his two sons, J. Searcy Bracewell Jr. and Fentress Bracewell, joined with Bert H. Tunks to practice together in Houston under the name of Bracewell & Tunks. Searcy Bracewell was elected into the Texas Senate in 1946, representing Harris County, and ultimately becoming the Majority Leader of the Senate. Fentress Bracewell led the development of the firm, serving as the firm's first managing partner. Fentress was appointed Houston Port Commissioner in 1968 and chaired the Port of Houston Authority for 15 years. Bert Tunks was appointed a district court judge in 1957 and was later named Chief Justice of the First Court of Appeals.

Harry W. Patterson joined the firm in 1951 and was made name partner in 1966 as Bracewell & Patterson prospered from the commercial growth of Houston.

On March 31, 2005, former New York City Mayor Rudolph W. Giuliani joined the firm as a name partner, and the firm was renamed as Bracewell & Giuliani. In January 2016, Giuliani left the firm by “amicable agreement,” and the firm was renamed Bracewell LLP.

== Clients ==
The firm's clients include major energy and natural resource concerns, from conventional energy sources to renewable energy such as solar power, wind power, hydrogen, hydropower, energy storage and renewable natural gas. The firm also has a multidisciplinary carbon capture utilization and sequestration practices in the U.S. In 2009, Bracewell's energy practice ranked as the largest in the U.S., according to Law360, with 117 energy attorneys.

According to one source, because of its broad-based energy experience, "Bracewell has earned a reputation as one of the most powerful law firms in the energy sector."

=== Notable clients and cases ===
- Advised Crédit Agricole Corporate and Investment Bank on refinancing of McDermott International, Ltd debt. The refinancing closed on March 25, 2024.
- Represented a lending group comprising Alinma Bank, Riyad Bank and Natixis Corporate & Investment Banking on the Al Ansar Hospital PPP in Saudi Arabia.
- Represented Trident Energy on a series of strategic transactions in the Republic of Congo in 2024.
- Advised CrossBoundary Energy in 2024 on their $140 million senior debt commitment from the Standard Bank of South Africa to scale their renewable energy portfolio across Africa.
- Represented consortium in their successful bid for, winning and financial close of the Juranah Independent Strategic Water Reservoir Project in the Kingdom of Saudi Arabia.
- Advised Truist Securities as the financial advisor to Sunoco in connection with Sunoco's $7.3 billion acquisition of NuStar Energy.
- Secured and finalized a Texas Supreme Court win for Apache in a dispute involving purchase and sales agreements and mineral leases in 2023.
- Acted as US counsel to Pembina Pipeline Corporation in its acquisition of Enbridge's joint venture interests in Alliance Pipeline, Aux Sable and NRGreen.
- Represented a lending group comprising Alinma, Riyad Bank, Banque Saudi Fransi and the National Infrastructure Fund on NEOM residential communities in Saudi Arabia.
- Acted as international counsel to the mandated lead arrangers and lenders, comprising Absa Bank Limited and the Mauritius Commercial Bank Limited, on the acquisition financing of Lekela Power B.V.
- Represented Phillips 66 in its $3.8 billion acquisition of all of the publicly held common units representing the limited partner interest in DCP Midstream, LP in 2023.
- Served as co-counsel to Major League Baseball in 2023 in Diamond Sports Group Chapter 11 bankruptcy.
- Represented lenders in Saad 300-MW solar photovoltaic IPP in Saudi Arabia, which reached a financial close on January 18, 2023.
- Represented Cactus, Inc. in 2023 in $621 million acquisition of FlexSteel Technologies Holdings, Inc. and its affiliates.
- Represented Global Infrastructure Partners in 2022 in the formation of a joint venture with Ocean Winds to develop a U.S. offshore wind project. The joint venture participated in the New York Bight offshore wind auction and secured one of the leases for $765 million.
- Represented Invenergy LLC and EnergyRe as project sponsors in 2022 in forming a consortium of investors in connection with Invenergy's $645 million winning bid for an offshore wind lease in the New York Bight offshore wind lease auction.
- Represented Holly Energy Partners in a set of transactions under which the company and HollyFrontier Corporation acquired Sinclair Transportation Company and Sinclair Oil Corporation.
- Represented Crescent Real Estate LLC in acquisition of The Crescent.
- Appointed by U.S. District Judge J. Paul Oetken in 2021 to serve as special master in privilege review in a criminal investigation into Rudy Giuliani's dealings with Ukrainian officials.
- Advised Kinder Morgan in 2021 in connection with its $1.2 billion acquisition of Stagecoach Gas Services and its four natural gas storage facilities.
- Advised Marubeni Corporation and Aljomaih Energy & Water Company in the 2021 financial closing on the Rabigh 300 MW solar photovoltaic IPP in Saudi Arabia.
- Represented RES in the negotiation and execution of a first-of-its-kind fixed-price, habitat restoration, maintenance and liability transfer agreement with Klamath River Renewal Corporation in 2021.
- Served as co-bond and co-disclosure counsel to North Texas Tollway Authority in 2021 in obtaining $848 million in bond financing.
- Defended Hilcorp. Energy Co. in a federal class action royalty dispute accusing the E&P company of underpaying royalties on natural gas production throughout Texas.
- Served as bond counsel in three transactions totaling over $1.363 billion in 2020 for the Houston Airport System.
- Served as bond counsel and company counsel in $181.27 million financing for the TMC3 Collaborative Research Campus.
- Represented Equinor as U.S. counsel in 2020 in its $1.1 billion sale to BP of a 50 percent interest in the Empire Wind project and the Beacon Wind project off the U.S. East Coast.
- Represented Eni in 2020 in connection with its agreement to acquire a 20 percent interest in the Dogger Bank (A and B) 2.4 GW offshore wind farm project from Equinor and SSE.
- Represented Fotowatio Renewable Ventures in 2020 in connection with its second utility-scale battery storage project, in collaboration with UK developer Harmony Energy.
- Represented The Trevor Project in the effort to establish 9-8-8 as the National Suicide Prevention Hotline and to ensure that LGBTQ youth can access specialized services.
- Defended Toshiba Corp., Toshiba America Electronic Components, Inc. and Toshiba America Business Solutions, Inc. against five U.S. patent claims asserted by Monument Peak Ventures, LLC related to facial recognition algorithms, digital marketing, and the capture and manipulation of digital images.
- Represented Kinder Morgan (NYSE: KMI) in the 2019 sale of the U.S. portion of the Cochin Pipeline to Pembina Pipeline Corporation.
- Represented Prosperity Bancshares in 2019 in connection with a definitive merger agreement with LegacyTexas Financial Group.
- Represented AP Energy Holdings in the closing of financing and equity arrangements for the construction of the $1.3 billion South Field Energy project.
- Appointed by Cardinal Timothy Dolan in 2018 to serve as independent reviewer and special counsel to assess the Archdiocese of New York's compliance with the Charter for the Protection of Children and Young People.
- Represented Hydro One in the $5.3 billion acquisition of Avista in 2017.
- Represented Kinder Morgan's 2014 consolidation of Kinder Morgan Energy Partners LP, Kinder Morgan Management LLC, and El Paso Pipeline Partners LP, the $70 billion deal was the second-largest energy deal when announced.
- Represented Kinder Morgan in connection with its 2011 IPO, the largest IPO in the energy industry in over a decade.
