= Université Centrale (Tunis) =

University in Tunisia

- Type: Private
- Established: 2001
- Founders: Slah Ben Turkia
- Location: Tunis, Tunisia; 36.82°N 10.18°E
- Campus: Multiple sites
- Website: www.universitecentrale.net/fr/
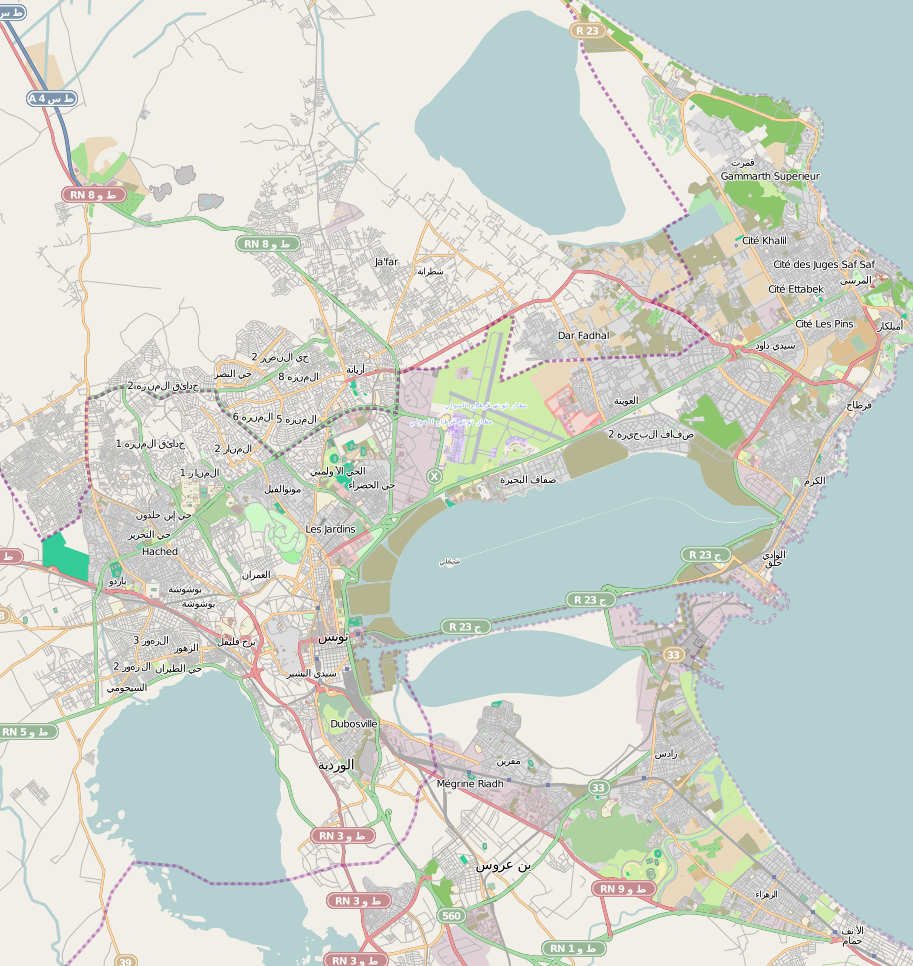
- Location in Greater Tunis Université Centrale (Tunis) (Tunisia)

Université Centrale (Arabic : الجامعة المركزية الخاصة), is a private university based in Tunis, Tunisia. It offers degrees in engineering, health, information technology, and business.

Since 2017, it has been part of Honoris United Universities.

== History ==
Launched in 2001, by Slah Ben Turkia, the university is divided in 2010 in 4 structures :

- École centrale des sciences médicales et de la santé
- École centrale polytechnique privée de Tunis
- École centrale de droit et de gestion
- École centrale des lettres, des arts et des sciences de la communication

== Partnerships ==
In 2021, the university launches a school of real estate with Century 21.

UC has partnerships with different startup incubators, in Italy for example.

Academic partners are almost all in Europe and the United States, Oakland University for example.

The health students are trained in the Tunis Medical Simulation Center.
