= Management College of Southern Africa =

MANCOSA
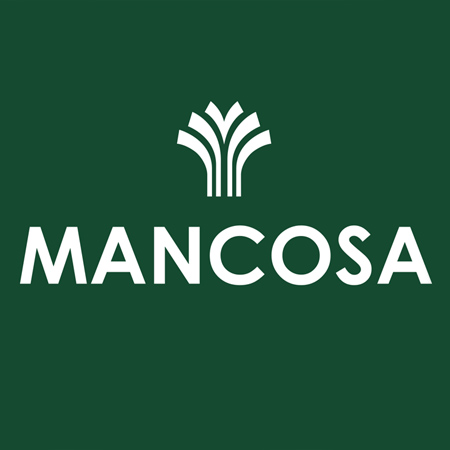
- Industry: Education
- Founded: 1995; 31 years ago
- Headquarters: Durban, South Africa
- Website: www.mancosa.co.za

The Management College of Southern Africa (MANCOSA) is an education institution located in Durban, South Africa. It is a private higher education institution, established in 1995 as a post-apartheid empowerment institution, offering affordable and accessible management education primarily to persons previously denied access to postgraduate education. In 2017, it joined Honoris United Universities. From 2002, MANCOSA publishers the Journal of Management & Administration.

== Programmes ==
MANCOSA offers programs for business administration, commerce, functional management and leadership. It confers certifications ranging from certificates to master's degrees. With over 10,000 students currently registered, it is one of the largest providers of management programmes through supported distance learning in Southern Africa.

== Management ==
In 2002 it received Full Institutional Accreditation from the Higher Education Quality Committee (HEQC), the quality assuring committee of the Council on Higher Education (CHE); its programmes are registered on the South African Qualifications Authority's National Qualifications Framework (NQF). In 2017 MANCOSA joined Honoris United Universities alongside educational institutions in the countries of Tunisia (IMSET, ESPRIT), Morocco (EMSI), Mauritius (Honoris Educational Network), South Africa (Regent Business School), Zimbabwe, and Zambia.

== Notable alumni ==
- Doreen Sioka, Namibian Minister of Labour and Social Welfare
- Alistair Mokoena, chief executive officer, Ogilvy South Africa
- Ayanda Dlodlo, RSA Minister of State Security Minister
- Gwede Mantashe, South African politician and trade unionist
- Tjekero Tweya, Namibia Minister of Industrialisation, Trade and SME Development
- Leevi Shiimi Katoma, Namibian Member of Parliament
- Evelyn !Nawases-Taeyele, Namibian Member of Parliament

== See also ==
- List of universities in Zambia
- Education in Zambia
