= Bopasenatla Secondary School =

Bopasenatla High School
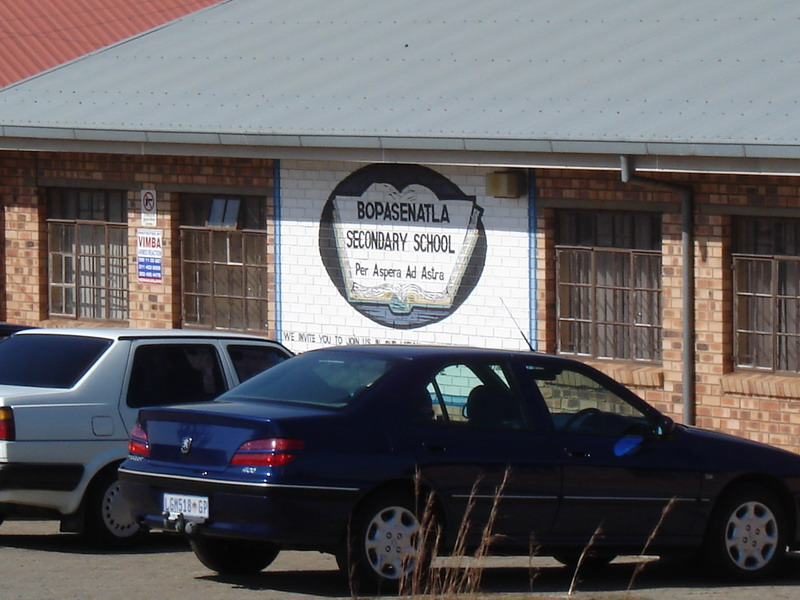

Location
- 26.2506°S 27.943°E

Information
- Type: Government
- Motto: Per Aspera Ad Astra
- Established: 1972
- Principal: Radzuma Bopasen (2026)
- Enrolment: c.1100
- Colours: Powder blue and navy blue
- Website: school site

Bopasenatla Secondary School is a government secondary school in Diepkloof, Soweto. It was previously known as Junior Secondary School. In 2025 the school reported a 100% pass rate and over a 1,000 pupils.

== History ==
The school was started in 1972 when it was called Junior Secondary School. Bopasenatla is a Sotho word that means to build a strong human. It teaches years 8 to 12 in Diepkloof, Soweto.

In 2000 Lucas Radebe who had become the captain of the Leeds United football club returned to make a gift of computers. Radabe had left the school from year eight to go to a quieter neighbourhood.

In 2013 it has under 600 pupils who were taught by approximately twenty educators. The school had a technology lab and a computer lab. The school also claimed a library, but reports of a fire of books in 2012 said there was no library.

In 2023 the pass rate was 91% and by 2025 the school was one of the best in Soweto with 111 students achieving a 100% pass rate in the matric exams. The school had at one time contemplated closing having 200 students in 2021 but by 2025 there was well over a thousand. The school was nominated as a contender for a new computer lab by the education authority. Head teacher Radzuma Bopasen welcomed the new equipment in 2026 which included a sublimation printer, laser cutter, 3D printers and virtual reality headsets donated by the Regent Business School.

== Alumni ==
Notable alumni include:

- Sello "Chicco" Twala - musician
- Lucas Radebe - Leeds United footballer
