= Institut maghrébin des sciences économiques et technologiques =

Private vocational school based in Tunis, Tunisia

- Institut maghrébin des sciences économiques et technologiques (IMSET)
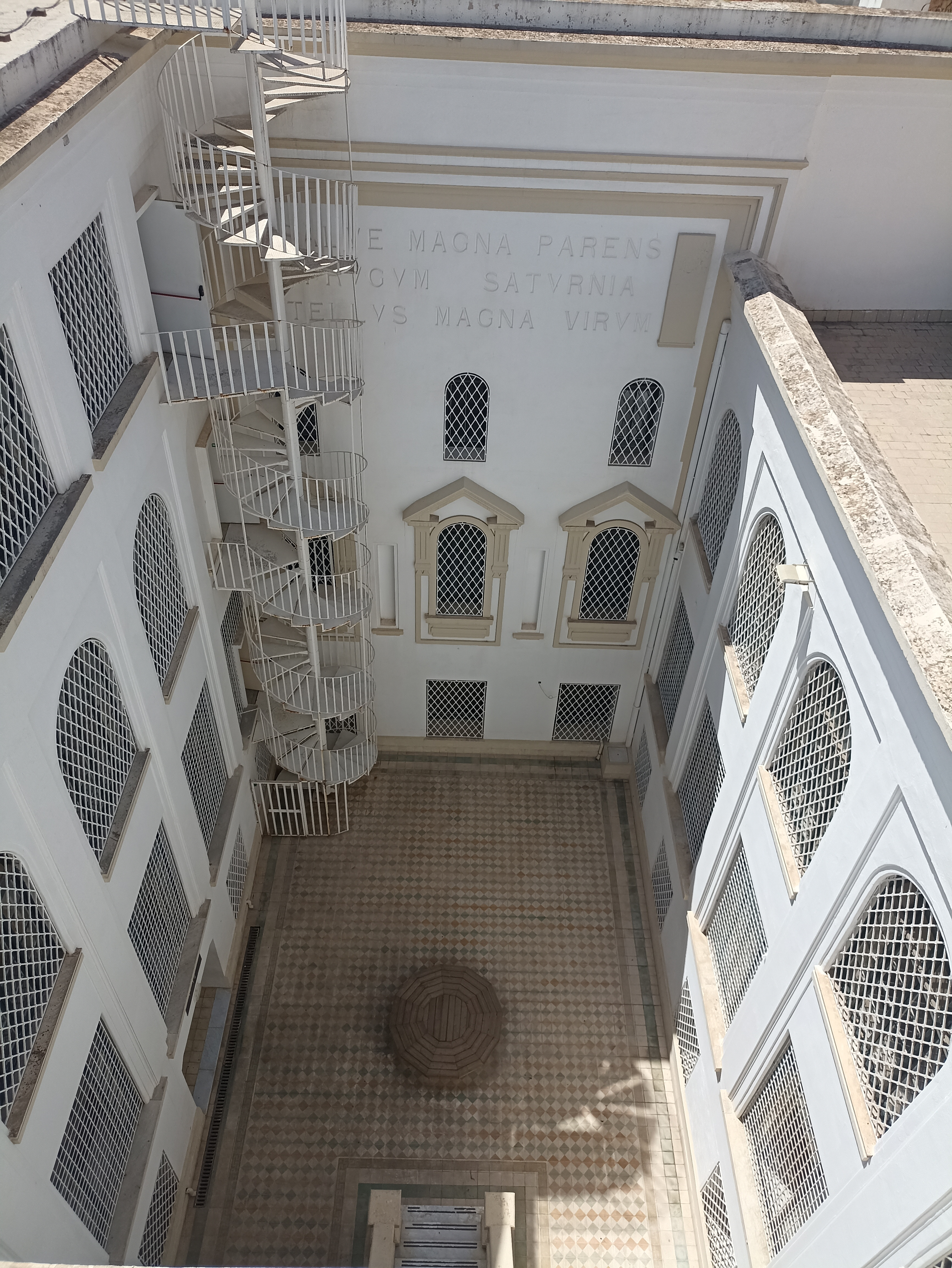
- Type: Private
- Established: 1993
- Founders: Slah et Chedia Ben Turkia
- Location: Tunis, Tunisia; 36.80062°N 10.18263°E
- Website: www.imset.ens.tn

The Institut maghrébin des sciences économiques et technologiques (IMSET) is a private vocational school based in Tunis, Tunisia. Since 2017, it has been part of Honoris United Universities. IMSET has campus facilities in Tunis, Sousse, Gabès and Nabeul. It offers training in management, computer science, health, agriculture and technology.

== History ==
IMSET was founded in 1993 in Tunis. In 2019, it had 26,000 alumni. In 2017, IMSET joined Honoris United Universities.

The institute joined forces with Université centrale - Tunis. In 2010, the institution signed an academic agreement with the University of Kinshasa.

Since 2021, the students have access to a career center.

In 2022, the International Finance Corporation ran an employability audit of IMSET.

== See also ==
- Mancosa
- Nile University of Nigeria
