= Honoris Medical Simulation Center =

- Type: Private
- Established: 2018
- Location: Tunis, Tunisia
- Campus: Urban, 0.6 acres (0.24 ha)
- Website: honorismedicalsimulation.net

The Honoris Medical Simulation Center of Tunis is a private healthcare simulation center located in Tunis, Tunisia.

== History ==
Inaugurated in November 2018, it became the first medical simulation center in the Maghreb region at that time. The institution is part of the Honoris United Universities network, which has invested four million dinars into its development. Spanning 2,500 square meters, it provides training for medical professionals, nurses and students.

Led by Professor Chedli Dziri, the center is equipped with four simulation units featuring connected mannequins and virtual reality headsets.

In 2020, more than 2,000 students and professionals had received training at the center.

The center received accreditation from the Society for Simulation in Healthcare in 2020. Additionally, it holds accreditation from the Tunisian National Authority for Evaluation and Accreditation in Healthcare.
