= UPSAT =

University in Tunisia

Coordinates: 36°48′48″N 10°10′42″E

- UPSAT Logo
- Type: Private
- Established: 2002
- Academic affiliations: Honoris United Universities
- Location: Tunis, Sousse, Sfax, Tunisia
- Website: https://upsat.tn/

UPSAT is a private higher education institution located in Tunis, Tunisia. Part of the Honoris United Universities network since 2018, UPSAT is also present in Sousse and Sfax.

The institute offers courses in the field of healthcare.

== History ==
UPSAT specializes in paramedical training and has been recognized since 2002 by the Tunisian ministries of Higher Education and Health. The institution offers bachelor's and master's degrees, particularly in anesthesia, nursing, and medical radiology.

In 2019, UPSAT created a scientific day called "Pink October" dedicated to the prevention of breast cancer.

Since 2021, students have access to a career center located in Tunis, which helps students review their CVs and prepare for job interviews.

=== Partnership ===
The institution partners with MSH International in Tunisia to train some of its students.

Since 2020, students have been able to practice at the Medical Simulation Center of Tunis. They train using medical equipment on mannequins and virtual reality headsets.

A partnership with Huawei was also announced in 2022.

=== Ranking ===
In 2021, the Tunisian magazine Entreprises Magazine ranked the institution third in its ranking of the best healthcare schools in the country.

== See also ==
- Honoris United Universities
