= Red and Yellow Creative School of Business =

South African business school

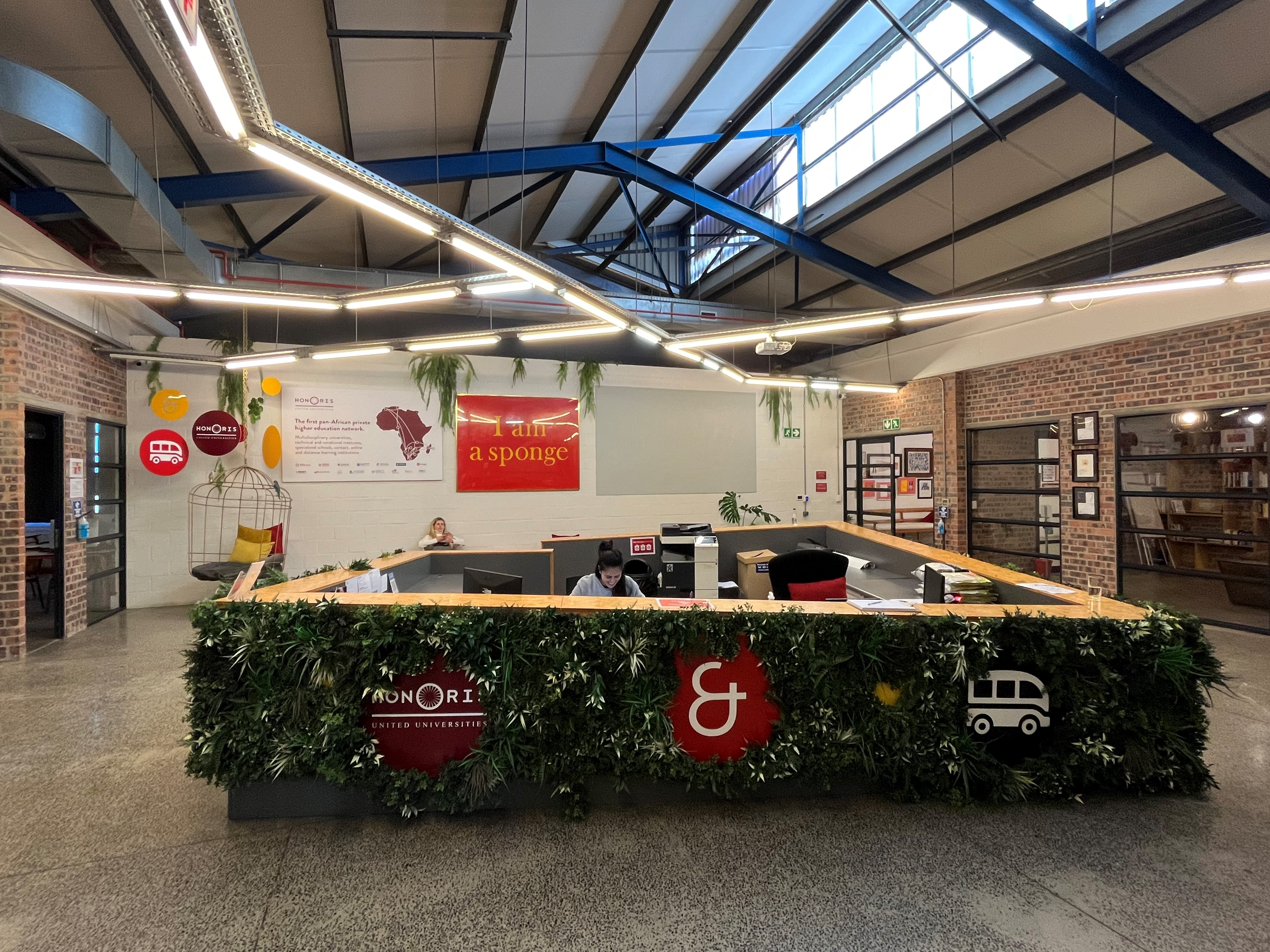
- Red and Yellow lobby
- Type: Graduate Business School
- Established: 1994
- Parent institution: Honoris United Universities
- Location: Cape Town, South Africa; 33°56′0.406″S 18°27′38.153″E
- Campus: Urban
- Language: English
- Website: www.redandyellow.co.za
- Location in Western Cape Red and Yellow Creative School of Business (South Africa) Red and Yellow Creative School of Business (Africa)

Red and Yellow Creative School of Business (R&Y) is a business school in Cape Town, South Africa. Founded in 1994, it offers training in management, marketing and design.

== History ==
The school was founded in 1994 under the name « Red & Yellow School of Logic and Magic ». 26 years later it joined Honoris United Universities.

In 2022, the institution organizes its first summit dedicated to the metaverse. Two years earlier, the school had its first four online degrees accredited.

=== Expansion ===
In 2022, R&Y launches a certificate on the Tunisian market, in partnership with Université Centrale, in Nigeria and in Mauritius.

=== Partnership ===
In 2021, the school announced a partnership with Unilever.

== See also ==
- Honoris United Universities
