= Dilli Dogo =

Nigerian surgeon (born 1959)

Professor Dilli Dogo
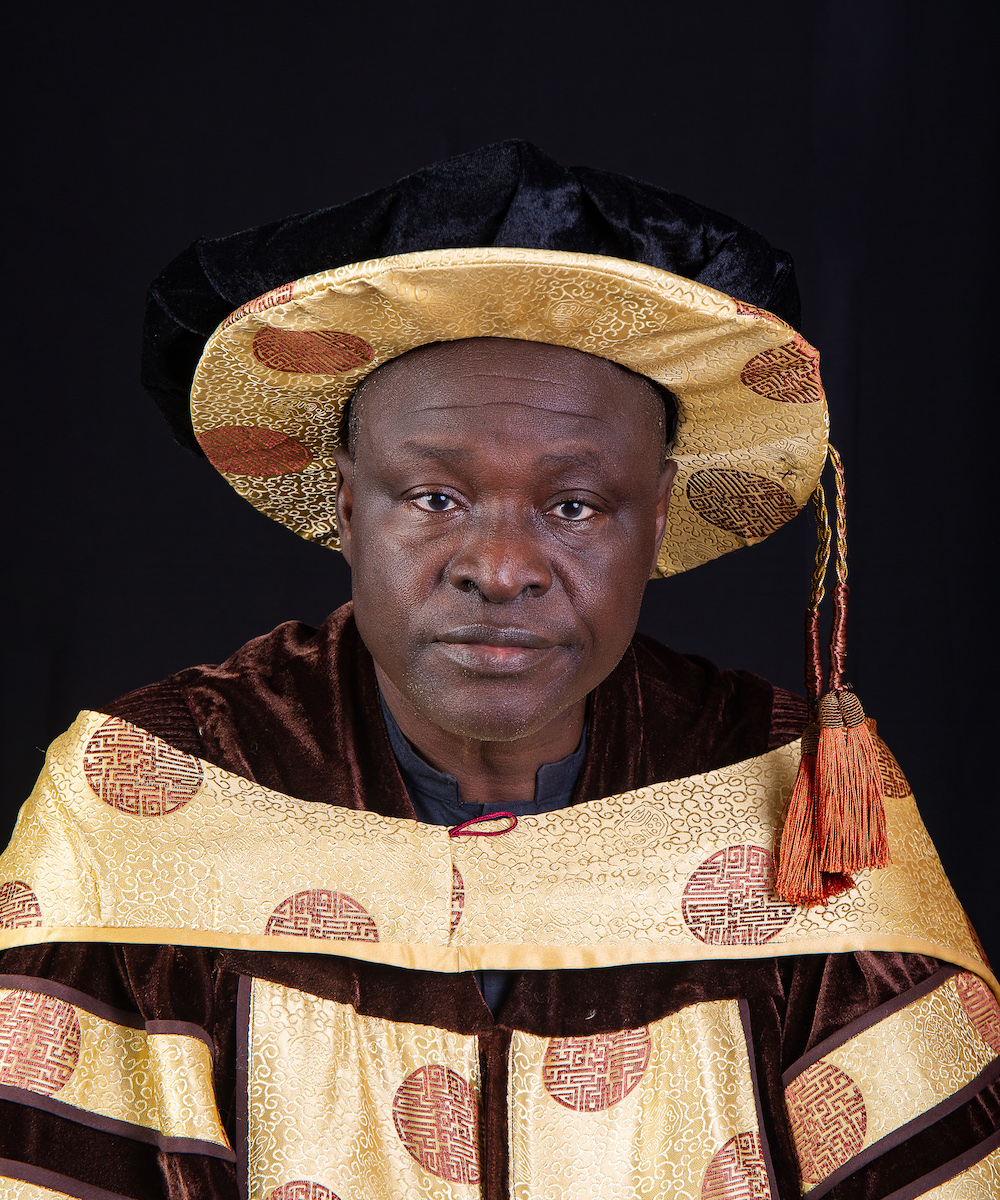
- Born: 1959 (age 66–67); Marama Town, Borno State, Nigeria
- Education: University of Maiduguri (MBBS 1984); University of Strasburg (2008); Universtat klinikum (2011)
- Occupations: Surgeon; Vice Chancellor of Nile University of Nigeria
- Employer: Nile University of Nigeria
- Notable work: Treatment of ganglion using hypertonic saline as sclerosant Skin hook for developing Countries; Pfizer Medical Research Board member for Cadura and Viagra (Sildenafil)
- Honours: Fellow of the Medical College of Surgeons (FMCS); Fellow of the West African College of Surgeons (FWACS); Fellow of the International College of Surgeons (FICS); Fellow of the International Society of Surgeons (FISS)

Professor Dilli Dogo (born 1959) is a Nigerian professor of surgery and consultant general surgeon. He is currently the Vice Chancellor of Nile University of Nigeria, Abuja.

== Early life and education ==
Dilli Dogo was born in Marama town of Hawul local government area, Borno state of Nigeria in 1959. He earned his Bachelor of Medicine and Surgery (Distinction in Medicine and Pysiology) from the University of Maiduguri in 1984. He got automatic employment as a Medical Research Fellow from the University of Maiduguri where he was also sponsored for his postgraduate studies in surgery.

Dogo had his Fellowship and Residency Training program at the University College Hospital, Ibadan between 1987 and 1991, he then proceeded to National Postgraduate Medical College of Nigeria in 1991 for his postgraduate education. In 2008, he obtained a Diploma in Laparoscopic Surgery at the European Institute of Telesurgery and Robotics, University of Strasburg in France and a Certificate in Endoscopic Urology, Directorate of Urology, Universtat.klinikum, Lubeck, Germany in 2011.

== Career ==
Dogo started his career as a medical research fellow at the University of Maiduguri and rose to the rank of a professor of surgery. In 2011, he was appointed the Provost of the College of Medical Sciences of the university. Dogo also served on many management committees and was a member of the Governing Council of the University of Maiduguri from 2012 to 2015. He was the Endowment's coordinator and Director of Public-Private Partnerships at the university.

Dogo from 2018 to date is a member of Governing Board of Management of the University of Maiduguri and was between 2012 and 2014 the Chairman National Association of Colleges of Medicine, NACOM, now APCOM. In 2017, he was appointed as special adviser on health matters to the Government of Borno State. He also served as chairman, of the Faculty of Surgery National Postgraduate Medical College of Nigeria and member of the Governing Board of the college. He was requested to join Nile University of Nigeria to assist in developing the College of Medical Sciences and in 2022, he was appointed the University's Vice Chancellor.

== Awards and honours ==
- Distinguished Fellowship Award by National Postgraduate Medical College of Nigeria
- Fellow of the Medical College of Surgeons (FMCS)
- Fellow of the West African College of Surgeons (FWACS)
- Fellow of the International College of Surgeons (FICS)
- Fellow of the International Society of Surgeons (FISS)
- Fellow of the American College of Surgeons
- Foundation fellow of Nigeria Academy of Medicine (FNAMed)
- Fellow of National Postgraduate Medical College of Nigeria
- President, Nigerian Surgical Research Society (NSRS) 2008–2010
- Ambassador representing Nigeria at World Forum, ABI, Oxford, England 2006
- Ambassador, Representing Nigeria at World ABI, Cambridge, England

=== Professional Associations ===
- Nigerian Academy of Medicine
- Nigerian Surgical Research Society (NSRS)
- American College of Surgeons
- International Society of Surgeons

=== Notable works ===
- Medical Research Board member appointed by Pfizer to Review and coordinate drug trials for the introduction of Cadura and Viagra (Sildenafil) with a view to ascertaining its Efficacy and Safety
- Treatment of ganglion using hypertonic saline as sclerosant
- Skin hook for developing Countries.
