= Lekela Power =

Independent power producer based in the Netherlands

- Type: Private
- Industry: Electric power generation
- Founded: 2015; 11 years ago
- Headquarters: Amsterdam, Netherlands
- Products: Electricity
- Website: lekela.com

Lekela Power B.V. is an independent power producer (IPP) company based in the Netherlands, with investments on the African continent. The firm specializes in renewable energy sources (primarily wind). As of July 2022, the firm has seven operational wind power plants in three countries, with another three renewable power stations under development. At that time, its total portfolio of power stations totaled over 1,000 MW (1 Gigawatt), in generation capacity.

== Location ==
Lekela maintains its headquarters in Amsterdam, Netherlands. The company also maintains offices in London, United Kingdom, Cairo, Egypt and Dakar, Senegal.

== Overview ==
The firm was established in 2015. As of July 2022, it owns, either directly or with others, a generation portfolio of over 1 gigawatt of generation capacity, including five wind farms in South Africa (624MW); One in Egypt (252MW) and one in Senegal (159MW). At that time, the firm was also evaluating development possibilities in Ghana, Egypt and Senegal.

== Ownership ==
Between 2015 and 2022 the shareholding in Lekela Power B.V. was as illustrated in the table below:

Shareholding In Lekela Power B.V. (2015 - 2022)
| Rank | Shareholder | Domicile | Percentage | Notes |
|---|---|---|---|---|
| 1 | Actis Capital | United Kingdom | 60.0 | |
| 2 | Mainstream Renewable Power Africa Holdings | Ireland | 40.0 | |
| | Total | | 100.00 | |

- Note: Mainstream Renewable Power Africa Holdings is a consortium in which the largest investor is Mainstream Renewable Power.

In July 2022, the owners of the firm signed definitive sales agreements to relinquish ownership and transfer shareholding to Infinity Energy, a company based in Cairo, Egypt and Africa Finance Corporation, a development finance institution, based in Lagos, Nigeria.

The sales price is reported to be approximately US$1.5 billion. The deal is expected to close during the fourth quarter of 2022, following the requisite regulatory approvals.

== Power stations ==
The table below illustrates the power stations in Lekela Power's generation portfolio as of July 2022. The list is not all inclusive.

Partial List of Power Stations Owned and Operated By Lekela Power
| Rank | Power Station | Country | Capacity (MW) | % Owned | Notes |
|---|---|---|---|---|---|
| 1 | Kangnas Wind Power Station | South Africa | 140 | | |
| 2 | Noupoort Wind Power Station | South Africa | 82 | | |
| 3 | Khobab Wind Power Station | South Africa | 140 | | |
| 4 | Loeriesfontein 2 Wind Power Station | South Africa | 140 | | |
| 5 | Taiba N'Diaye Wind Power Station | Senegal | 159 | | |
| 6 | West Bakr Wind Power Station | Egypt | 252 | | |

== See also ==
- Energy in Africa
