= Moroccan-American Commission for Educational and Cultural Exchange =

Moroccan-American Commission for Educational and Cultural Exchange (MACECE)
- Formation: 1982
- Type: Professional organization
- Headquarters: Rabat, Morocco
- Executive Director: Rebecca Geffner
- Chairman of the board: Wael Benjelloun
- Website: www.macece.ma

The Moroccan-American Commission for Educational and Cultural Exchange (MACECE) is a non-profit Commission facilitating academic exchange between Morocco and the United States. Based in Rabat, Morocco, MACECE runs several undergraduate and graduate studies and professional development programs including the Fulbright Program. The Commission was created in 1982 as a result of a binational agreement which is funded by both governments. Educational and cultural exchange is managed in the form of grants for both Moroccans and Americans.
