= ESPRIT (university) =

Academic institution in Tunisia

Private Higher School of Engineering and Technology (ESPRIT)
- المدرسة العليا الخاصة للهندسة والتكنولوجيا
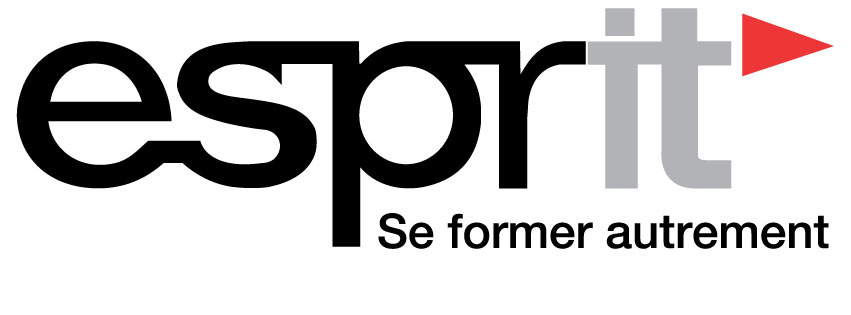
- ESPRIT logo
- Other name: École supérieure privée d'ingénierie et de technologie
- Type: Private university
- Established: 2003
- Location: Ariana, Tunisia; 36°53′58.3″N 10°11′22.4″E
- Language: French, English
- Website: www.esprit.tn
- Location within Tunisia

The Private Higher School of Engineering and Technology (French: École supérieure privée d'ingénierie et de technologie), or ESPRIT, is a private engineering university in Tunisia based in Ariana and accredited by the Ministry of Higher Education and Scientific Research (approval N°2003-03).

Since 2020, it has belonged to the Honoris United Universities group.

In 2021, Entreprises Magazine ranked ESPRIT as the best private engineering University in Tunisia.

== Diplomas ==
ESPRIT offers several specialties and courses:

- Preparatory cycle for engineering studies
- Computer Science
- Telecommunications engineering
- Civil engineering
- Electromechanical engineering
- Management science
