= Université Mundiapolis =

Coordinates: 33.3821°N 7.5677°W

- Arabic: جامعة العالمیة
- Established: 2009; 17 years ago
- Location: Casablanca, Morocco

Université Mundiapolis (Arabic: جامعة العالمیة) is a private university in Casablanca, Morocco.

The university, a merger of the Institut du Management et du Droit de l'Entreprise (IMADE), Ecole Marocaine d'Informatique, Electronique et Automatique (EMIAE), and Polyfinance; was established in 2009 (17 years ago) as Morocco's full private university.
