= Regent Business School =

Distance education institution in Durban, South Africa

- Motto: « Disrupt. Rethink. Innovate »
- Type: Private
- Established: 1998
- Founder: Yusuf Karodia
- Dean: Shahiem Patel
- Location: Durban, South Africa
- Website: regent.ac.za

Regent Business School is a distance education institution located in Durban, South Africa. It is a private higher education institution, established in 1998 as a post-apartheid empowerment institution. In 2017 Regent Business School joined Honoris United Universities.

Regent Business School - Johannesbourg

== History ==
At inception, a link was established with the University of Luton in the United Kingdom to offer a range of business and management programmes by supported-learning. Regent Business School is now registered as a private higher education institution, and the degrees offered by the School are fully accredited by the Council on Higher Education (CHE).

In 2025 the high achieving Bopasenatla Secondary School in Soweto was one of the schools who received state of the art computer equipment paid for by the Regent Business School.

=== Programmes ===
At the undergraduate level, RBS offers the Bachelor of Commerce (BCom) degree, in addition to various certificate and diploma courses.

At the postgraduate level, it offers the MBA.
