= SIM (Christian organization) =

Evangelical Christian mission organization

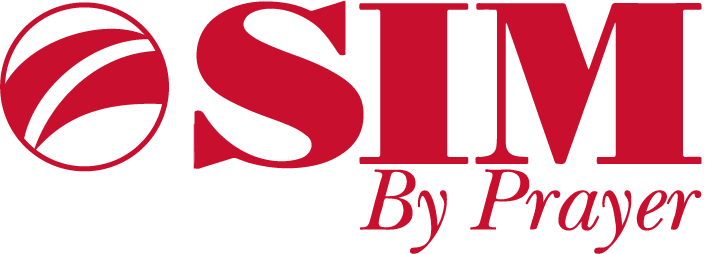
- Founded: 1893; 132 years ago
- Founders: Walter Gowans; Rowland Bingham; Thomas Kent
- Type: Non-profit, Christian mission
- Location: Global
- Services: Sending mission workers, resourcing local churches, etc
- Fields: Christian Missionary Outreach
- Members: 4,000 missionaries serving in more than 75 countries on 6 continents (2017)
- Website: sim.org

SIM is an international, interdenominational Evangelical Christian mission organization. It was established in 1893 by its three founders, Walter Gowans and Rowland Bingham of Canada and Thomas Kent of the United States.

The initials originally stood for "Soudan Interior Mission," Soudan being an older spelling of the Sudan region of West Africa. After various name changes and mergers, the mission simply goes by "SIM" today. In French-speaking countries it is known as "Société Internationale Missionnaire." SIM is also a member of the Forum of Bible Agencies International.

== History ==
SIM was founded in 1893, although the earliest elements of it were founded in 1860 with the British Syrian Schools Association in the Middle East. It is built up of a succession of partnerships and mergers.

=== West Africa – Sudan Interior Mission ===
In 1893 Walter Gowans, Rowland Bingham and Thomas Kent landed in Lagos, Nigeria. Their aim was to evangelize the "Soudan" region of Africa through the organization of the "Soudan Interior Mission." Gowans and Kent traveled to what is now Northern Nigeria with a Kru guide, Tom Coffee, but the two died of malaria. Bingham survived and returned to his home in Canada.

Bingham reorganized the mission in 1898 as the "African Industrial Mission," with a hope to be self-supporting through the production and trade of cotton. In 1900, Bingham made a second attempt to establish a base in Africa but came down with fever and returned home. A third attempt in 1902 succeeded, which finally established a base 500 miles inland in Patigi, Nigeria. In 1906, the mission was once renamed "Sudan Interior Mission."

After the initial base was set up, the mission branched out into other countries in West Africa, and then in the 1920s, to East Africa. Until 1998, SIM worked in Benin, Burkina Faso, Central African Republic, Ivory Coast, Eritrea, Ethiopia, Ghana, Guinea, Kenya, Liberia, Malawi, Niger, Nigeria, Senegal, South Africa, Sudan and Togo.

=== South America ===
In 1907, George Allan and his wife Mary, née Stirling, from New Zealand, initiated the Bolivian Indian Mission (BIM), later known as Andes Evangelical Mission (AEM). Initially, the headquarters was located in San Pedro de Buena Vista before being transferred to the more accessible Cochabamba. Whereas the mission activities were relatively straightforward among the Quechua on the (highland) Altiplano, the real challenge began when the BIM reached out to the naked tribes of the inhospitable lowland Beni region. Here, in 1923, while exploring the area prior to establishing a mission station, BIM-founder Allan narrowly escaped death from malaria, but young fellow missionary Henry C. Webendorfer succumbed to the disease. According to Allan's daughter Margarita Allan Hudspith, William Fulton McKay, Frank Chaplin and Charles Trotman were among the missionary pioneers in the rainforests of Bolivia.

AEM joined SIM in 1982, and the work of SIM expanded to a new continent, South America.

In 1999, Radio Mosoj Chaski was founded as an evangelical short wave station to reach the Quechua-speaking population in Bolivia. The Station is based in Cochabamba and broadcasts in the Quechuan languages for the rural population. It is operated by SIM, along with New Tribes Mission and Pioneers International. The station began broadcasting in April 1999 on shortwave at 3.310 MHz. Broadcasting commenced at 09:00 GMT in a signal described as "good".

=== South Asia ===
In the 1890s, two other small missions were formed to work in Ceylon (now Sri Lanka), South India, and in the Philippines. In 1968, they joined forces and became the International Christian Fellowship (ICF).

In 1989, ICF merged with SIM, which expanded the work of SIM to parts of Asia.

=== Southern Africa ===
In 1889, Andrew Murray a Dutch Reformed minister, Spencer Walton and Martha Osborn-Howe formed the Cape General Mission in Cape Town. After the Boer War, the Mission, now known as the South African General Mission, began to expand into parts of southern Africa, and then to islands in the Indian Ocean.

In 1965, they became known as the Africa Evangelical Fellowship (AEF). They served in Angola, Botswana, Gabon, Madagascar, Mauritius, Réunion, Mozambique, Namibia, Swaziland, Tanzania, Zambia and Zimbabwe.

In 1998, AEF joined with SIM. This meant SIM workers were now operating in over 43 countries.

In 2023, SIM's South African country director, Siegfried Ngubane, was elected presiding bishop of the Reformed Evangelical Anglican Church of South Africa.

=== Middle East and North Africa ===
In 2016, branches of the Middle East Christian Outreach (MECO) joined hands with SIM. MECO was formed in 1959 by the merger of three organisations:

- the Lebanon Evangelical Mission (founded 1860 as the British Syrian Schools Association by Elizabeth Bowen Thompson)
- the Arabic Literature Mission (founded 1905 as Nile Mission Press)
- the Middle East General Mission (dating back to 1898 where it was started as the Egypt Mission Band).

The Canadian and Australian branches of MECO still exist independently of SIM.

=== East Africa ===
Founded in 1972 by four mission societies (AIM, SUM, SIM, and MAF), Across has since gone through a number of transitions in response to the changing conditions in South Sudan and partners outside Sudan. Across delivers literacy classes, Digital Audio Players (DAPs) (MP3 players) for literacy and social education, All Children Reading radio project (USAID) and runs Sudan Literature Centre which publishes in local language literacy materials for children and Christian literature for Christian church in South Sudan.

== Organization ==
It was renamed SIM International in 1980, Society for International Ministries in 1992 and SIM in 2002.

In 2017 SIM had more than 4,000 workers in over 70 countries

Sending offices are located in Australia, Canada, Côte d'Ivoire, Ethiopia, France, India, South Korea, South Africa, South America, United Kingdom, Singapore, New Zealand, Switzerland, and the United States. Some offices serve multiple countries. For example, the French office also covers Belgium. SIM also partners with many local mission organizations. For example, in Germany SIM is partners with DMG interpersonal e.V.
