= Frank Retief =

Anglican clergyman (born 1942)

Frank J. Retief (born 1942) is a retired Anglican clergyman. He served as Presiding Bishop of the Church of England in South Africa (now the Reformed Evangelical Anglican Church of South Africa) from 2000 to 2010.

Retief graduated from the University of the Western Cape and planted St James Church in Kenilworth, Cape Town in 1968. He pastored it until retiring in 1999 to take up the position of Presiding Bishop. During his time there, the church was the site of the Saint James Church massacre in 1993.

Retief testified to the Truth and Reconciliation Commission concerning his denomination's perceived support of apartheid.
