= Siegfried Ngubane =

South African Anglican bishop

The Most Reverend Siegfried Ngubane
- Presiding Bishop of REACH-SA
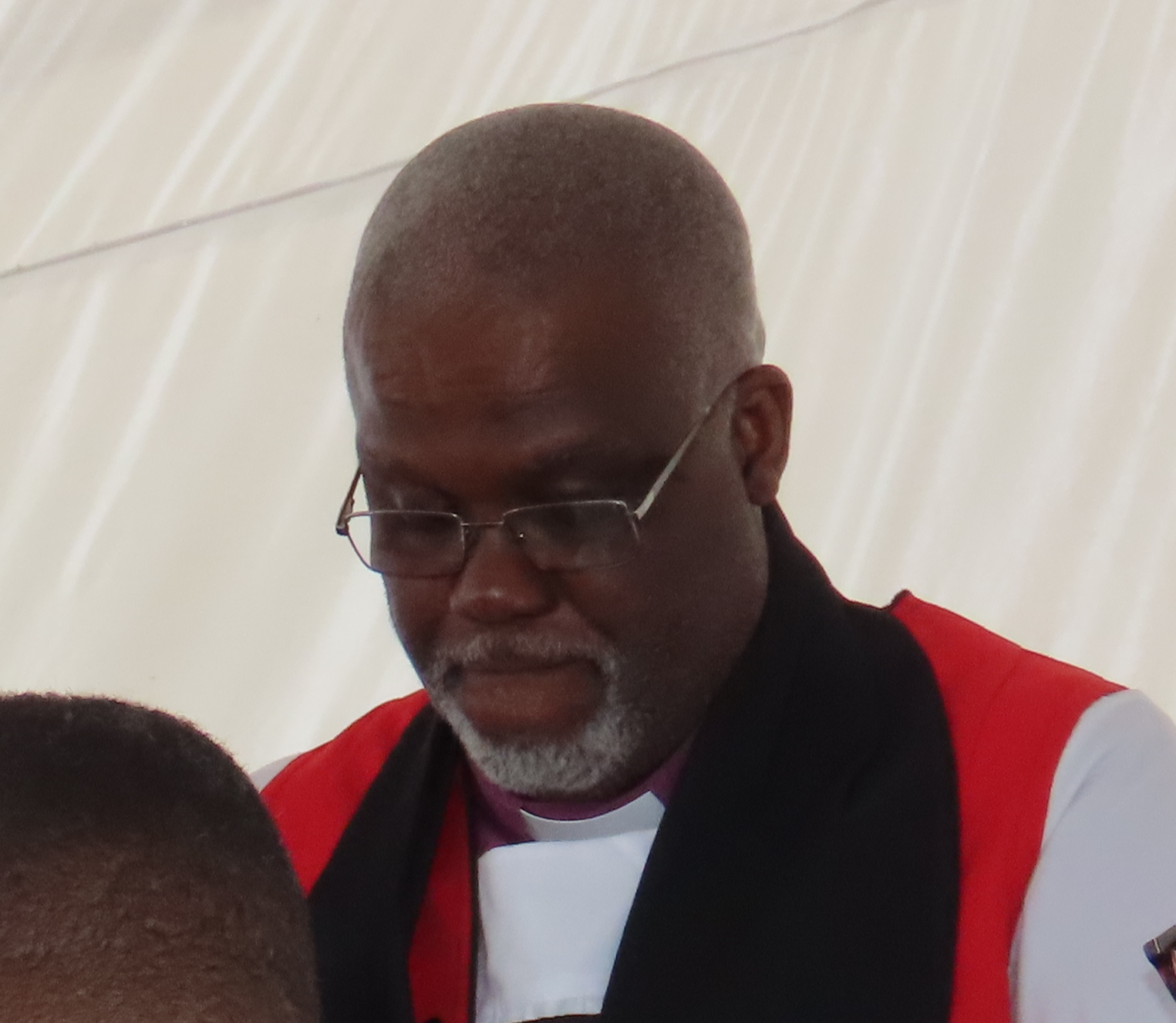
- Ngubane during an episcopal consecration in Namibia
- Church: Reformed Evangelical Anglican Church of South Africa
- In office: 2024–present
- Predecessor: Glenn Lyons
- Other post: Chancellor of George Whitefield College

Orders
- Consecration: 10 February 2024 by Glenn Lyons

Personal details
- Born: 1961 (age 64–65) Ixopo, KwaZulu-Natal
- Spouse: Maureen Ngubane
- Education: George Whitefield College, Stellenbosch University, South African Theological Seminary, University of the Free State

Siegfried John Ngubane (born 1961) is a South African Anglican bishop. He is the first indigenous African presiding bishop of the Reformed Evangelical Anglican Church of South Africa (REACH-SA).

== Biography ==
Ngubane graduated from the REACH-SA seminary, George Whitefield College (GWC), in 1998. He also holds master's degrees in industrial psychology from the Stellenbosch University and in missiology from South African Theological Seminary and a Ph.D. in missiology from the University of the Free State.

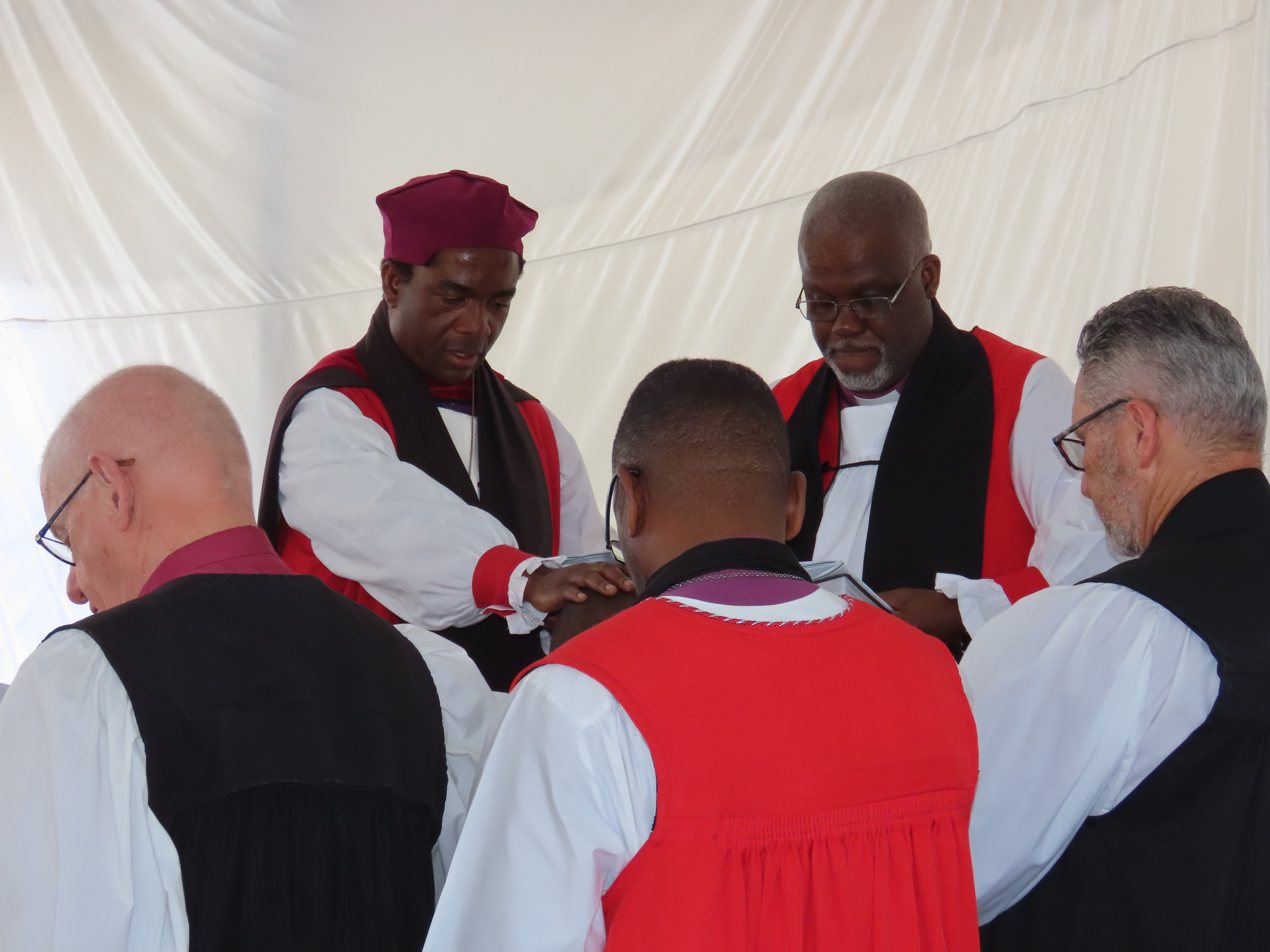
Ngubane (rear right) joins Lukas Katenda (rear left) in June 2025 in consecrating Nelson Ndakevondjo (kneeling, center) as a bishop for REACH Namibia.

Ngubane was rector of Christ Church Khayelitsha near Cape Town. He was also appointed the first indigenous African lecturer at GWC in 2004 as part of an initiative in the REACH-SA (then known as the Church of England in South Africa) to address the needs of multiracial and Black churches and mentor the growing number of indigenous African postulants entering the seminary. In 2010, he became the South African director of SIM, a cross-cultural missions agency.

In September 2023, the REACH-SA synod elected Ngubane as presiding bishop, succeeding Glenn Lyons. Ngubane was consecrated to the episcopate and installed as presiding bishop at Christ Church Midrand on 10 February 2024. In this capacity he is a member of the Global Fellowship of Confessing Anglicans (Gafcon) primates' council. In addition to REACH-SA bishops, several bishops from other Gafcon jurisdictions participated in Ngubane's consecration, including Stephen Kaziimba of the Church of Uganda, who preached at the service; Julian Dobbs of the Anglican Church in North America; Lukas Katenda from REACH-Namibia, Malcolm Richards from the Anglican Diocese of Sydney; and Andy Lines from the Anglican Network in Europe. Three bishops were also present representing the Anglican Church of Southern Africa and its primate, Thabo Makgoba.

== Personal life ==
Ngubane is Zulu. He is married to Maureen, and they have three adult children.

Religious titles
Preceded by Glenn Lyons	Presiding Bishop of REACH-SA; Since 2024	Incumbent
