= Namibia Evangelical Theological Seminary =

Coordinates: 22.55833°S 17.06151°E

Namibia Evangelical Theological Seminary (NETS) is a seminary in Windhoek, Namibia. NETS offer ministry and theological training and has multiple programs that include certificate, diploma, and degree levels.

== History ==
It was established in 1991 and is the only evangelical theological college in Namibia. It was founded shortly after independence by a merger of two theological institutions - Windhoek Theological Seminary (WTS) and Windhoek Evangelical Bible College (WEBCol). NETS provides ministry training to 16 local Christian denominations as well as para - church organizations.

NETS has trained students from Angola, Australia, Botswana, Burundi, Democratic Republic of Congo, Germany, Lesotho, the United States, Zambia and Zimbabwe.

== Academic qualifications ==
The seminary currently offers a suite of certificates, diplomas and degrees such as ;

- Certificate in Theology - The Certificate in Theology aims to equip people at a basic level for ministry in churches and communities
- Diploma in Ministry - (NQF Level 5) is for those who wish to be thoroughly equipped for ministry and leadership within churches, but who do not intend to continue on with further academic study after graduation.
- Bachelor of Theology- (NQF Level 7) is designed to equip students for a lifetime of Christian ministry, church leadership and further scholarship.
- Bachelor Honours - (NQF Level 8) is designed to prepare theology graduates for post-graduate studies in theology at Masters and Doctoral level.

== Academic leadership and faculty ==
- Principal- Academic Dean & Lecturer - Rev. Misseline Gordon (Since January 2025)
- Leadership (Student Dean) & Lecturer - Mr. Paul Gunning
- Acting Distance Coordinator & Lecturer - Rev Joram Oudshoorn
- Lecturer (part time) - Rev Michael Knight
- Lecturer - Rev Daniel Webster
- Lecturer - Mr Eric Wildgen
- Lecturer - Ps. Pete Leininger
- Senior Faculty in Training - Pastor Romeo Tafadzwa Makwinye
- Adjunct Faculty - Right Rev Lukas Katenda
- Rev. Dr. Wynand Fourie
- Mr. Thomas Endjala
- Director of NETS Board & Lecturer (Part Time) - Rev. Dr. De Wet Stauss
