= Bartolomé Arzáns de Orzúa y Vela =

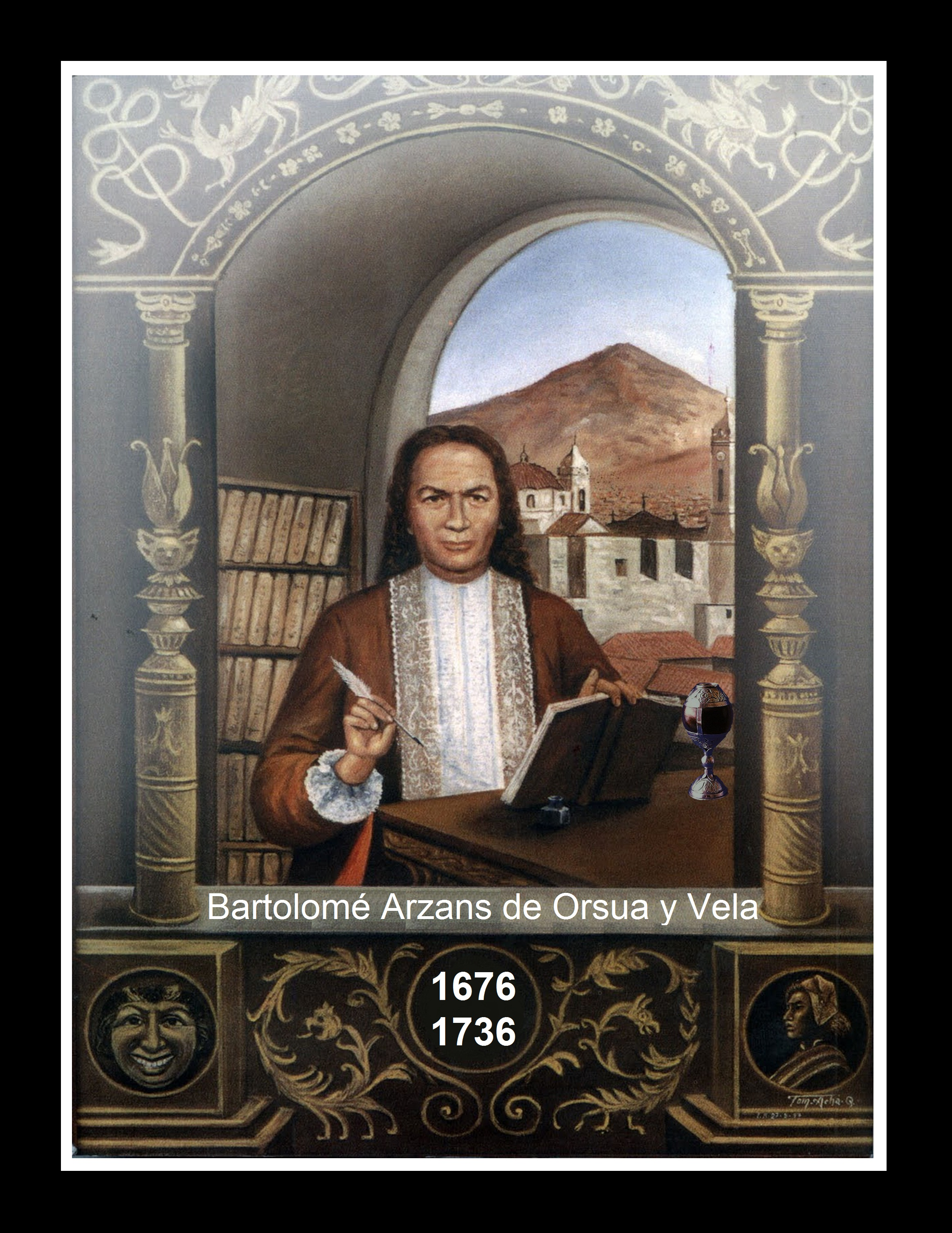
Bartolomé Arzáns de Orsúa y Vela

Bartolomé Arzáns de Orzúa y Vela (Imperial Villa of Potosí, 1676-January 25, 1736) was a chronicler from Potosí, author of a monumental literary and historiographical work that, under the title of History of the Imperial Villa of Potosí, makes him one of the most lucid and entertaining chroniclers of viceregal literature and considered an indispensable source for scholars of Charcas, today Bolivia.

== Biography ==
Son of Mateo Arzáns Dapífer and María Jordana de Castro, little is known about his life. He married Juana de Reina, fifteen years his senior, on May 2, 1701, in the Imperial Villa of Potosí. She was born in the city of La Plata, the illegitimate daughter of Alonso de Reina and María Santos de Lara. The couple had a son, named Diego, who was born before the marriage.

Around 1705 he began to write the History of the Imperial Villa of Potosí, a work that was interrupted by his death and continued by his son, Diego, who "added eight more chapters of inferior quality and full of grotesque facts."

Recovered at the beginning of the 20th century, Brown University published a three-volume edition in 1965.
