= Paka Chuku =

Mountain in Bolivia

- Location within Bolivia

Highest point
- Elevation: 2,600 m (8,500 ft)
- Coordinates: 18°32′32″S 65°39′18″W

Geography
- Location: Bolivia, Potosí Department
- Parent range: Andes

Paka Chuku (Quechua paka eagle, chuku hat, "eagle hat", also spelled Pacachuco) is a mountain in the Bolivian Andes that reaches a height of approximately 2,600 m (8,500 ft). It is located in the Potosí Department, Charcas Province, San Pedro de Buena Vista Municipality. Puka Chuku lies southeast of Puka Urqu. The Ch'alla Mayu flows along its northern slope.
