= Dudley Foord =

Australian and South African cleric (1923–2013)

Dudley Foord (26 August 1923 – 10 September 2013) was an Australian Anglican minister who served as the third presiding bishop of the Church of England in South Africa (now the Reformed Evangelical Anglican Church of South Africa) from 1984 to 1987.

Foord studied at the University of Sydney, the University of London, and Moore Theological College before becoming a priest in the 1958. (He later received a Doctor of Ministry from Fuller Theological Seminary in 1977.) He served as rector at Kingsgrove from 1960 to 1965, lecturer at Moore from 1965 to 1972, and then rector of Christ Church, St Ives from 1972 to 1984. He was instrumental in the establishment of the Katoomba Men's Convention and in bringing Evangelism Explosion to Sydney.

In 1984 Foord was consecrated as presiding Bishop of the Church of England in South Africa (CESA). The service was held at St Andrew's Cathedral and involved twelve bishops, including the Archbishop of Sydney, Donald Robinson, the previous Archbishop, Sir Marcus Loane, and the Anglican Primate of Australia, Sir John Grindrod – even though CESA was not recognized by the Archbishop of Canterbury. While in South Africa, Foord was instrumental in the establishment of George Whitefield College.

According to Sandy Grant, Foord was an "elder statesman" in the Anglican Diocese of Sydney: "Along with John Chapman, Dudley helped champion the model of systematic expository preaching shown by John Stott here in Sydney."

Preceded by Stephen Bradley	Presiding Bishop of the Church of England in South Africa; 1984–1987	Succeeded by Joe J. Bell
