= Letlapa Mphahlele =

Member of the National Assembly of South Africa

Member of the National Assembly

Personal details
- Born: 8 December 1960 (age 65)
- Citizenship: South Africa
- Party: Pan Africanist Congress of Azania

Letlapa Mphahlele (born 8 December 1960) is a member of the National Assembly of South Africa who represents the Pan Africanist Congress of Azania. He is from Manaleng in the Limpopo Province.

== Exile ==
Mphahlele left for exile in Botswana in August 1978. Upon his arrival, he joined the Pan Africanist Congress. As a refugee in Botswana, he was sent by the Botswana Government to the Dukwe Refugee Camp, and from there left for Tanzania, and then Guinea, where he underwent military training.

Returning to Botswana on an Azanian People's Liberation Army (APLA) assignment, he was expelled from the country and crossed the border to Zimbabwe, where he was detained as an illegal immigrant. After being released, he was appointed by the PAC as Chief representative to Uganda, but Ugandan President Yoweri Museveni turned down his appointment in favour of an old colleague. He was then appointed to APLA's high command, where he helped orchestrate several high-profile attacks against whites in South Africa, stating that he "regarded all whites as legitimate targets as they were complicit in the government's policy of apartheid". Still based in Zimbabwe, he was responsible for couriering arms from Botswana to South Africa, but was arrested in Botswana and sentenced to five years imprisonment. Ignored by the PAC and forced to rely upon African National Congress members for food and supplies, he embarked on a hunger strike and was visited by then PAC-president Zephania Mothopeng.

== Return to South Africa ==
Mphahele smuggled himself back into South Africa from Botswana in January 1991 and, for a time, hid in the rural areas around Mmabatho in what was then Bophuthatswana before making his way to meetup with underground units in the Transvaal Province. He moved between a number of locations in and around South Africa before establishing himself in the Transkei.

By 1993, Mphahlele had become the national director of operations for APLA. In that role he took responsibility for ordering the attacks on white areas resulting in the Saint James Church massacre and 11 deaths. During his application for amnesty in the Truth and Reconciliation Commission (TRC) he stated that he had authorised attacks on white civilians following the killing of five school children by the Transkei Defence Force in Umtata. Although the perpetrators of the massacre were granted amnesty, the TRC found the act itself, and other APLA/PAC attacks specifically targeting civilians, were "a gross violation of human rights" and a "violation of internal [sic] humanitarian law". During the period the APLA also attacked the Heidelberg Tavern resulting in 4 deaths, an attack that Mphahele planned and ordered.

Following South Africa's first democratic elections in 1994, he was arrested in Lesotho twice before being handed over to the South African Police and appeared before the Bloemfontein court on 3 January 1996.

== Political career ==
He was elected leader of the PAC in September 2006, and reelected unopposed in July 2008. Under his leadership, the PAC suffered numerous splits, a rebellion by its youth wing, PAYCO, and lost two of its three seats in the 2009 general election. He was expelled from the party in May 2013 on charges of financial impropriety, bringing the party into disrepute, and not steering the party in the right direction, and the decision was ratified in August 2013.

However, in Case No: 13/19023 (2013-06-14) of the South Gauteng High Court Johannesburg S Africa, with presiding Judge Kgomo, the following order was made:

1. " The meeting held on 11 May 2013 convened by the first respondent (Narius Moloto) is declared invalid and unconstitutional vis-a-vis the Constitution of the PAC.
2. All resolutions and/or decisions adopted or made at the above mentioned meeting of 11 May 2013 are declared invalid and are set aside
3. The suspension and subsequent or ultimate dismissal of the first applicant (Letlapa Mphahlele) is set aside. The first applicant remains the President of the second applicant(PAC).
4. The body of persons purported to be the NEC of the second applicant constituted pursuant to the meeting of 11 May 2013 is dissolved forthwith as their election is set aside.
5. The respondents (Narius Moloto and Phillip Dhlamini) are ordered to pay the costs of this application jointly and severally, the one paying, the other being absolved.

I submit that the accusations of financial impropriety and other accusations levelled against Letlapa Mphahlele are erroneous and have not been tested in a court of law, but follow from people who are envious of the rightful President of the PAC, namely Letlapa Mphahlele, until party elections later in 2014."

== Books ==
Mphahlele has written the following books:

- Child of this Soil: My life as a freedom fighter (2002)
- Mantlalela!: The Flood Is Coming (2013), ISBN 0620346574, Ojibwe Wonders Publishing and Arts
- Child Of This Soil: The Life of a Freedom Fighter (2015), ISBN 0795701497, Reach Publishers.

== Films ==
- Beyond Forgiving - Beyond Forgiving - Mphahlele to visit UK in May 2014
