= Gun Owners of South Africa =

Gun Owners South Africa
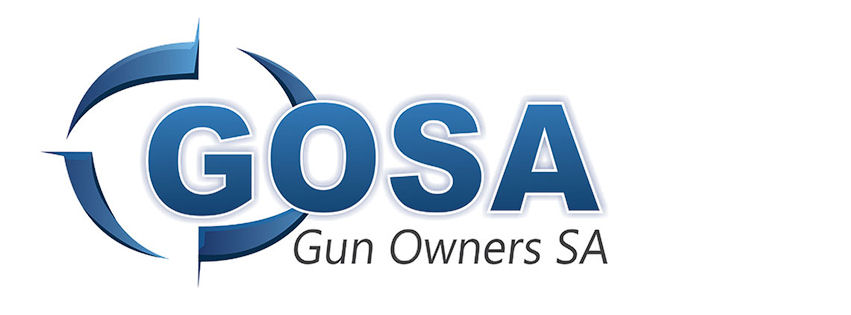
- Gun Owners South Africa logo
- Chairperson: Paul Oxley
- Website: www.gosaonline.co.za

Gun Owners South Africa (abbreviated to GOSA) is a firearms rights and advocacy group in the Republic of South Africa. It was founded on 26 January 2004 by Thomas Eastes and nine associates invited by him, Abios Khoele, Charl van Wyk, Pieter van Wyk, Juan de Greeff, Martin Hedington, Dr. Richard Wesson, Peter Moss, Brett Nortje and Dick Boothroyd. Because resources were limited to the voluntary efforts of its ten founders, it functioned as an advocacy group and no attempt was made to make it a membership based organisation. That became possible only when the founders handed control to Paul Oxley in 2014. Membership has since grown rapidly and GOSA is now the biggest organisation of its kind and thus able to defend firearm ownership rights more effectively.

GOSA is the most diverse firearms group in South Africa, on levels ranging from race, gender, and religion, to political affiliation and income levels. GOSA’s membership is on public display on its Facebook page.

One of the founding members of GOSA, Charl van Wyk, was a congregant at the St. James Church in Cape Town when the St. James Church Massacre happened. Azanian People’s Liberation Army (APLA) militants attacked the church with automatic rifles and a grenade. Van Wyk was armed with a five-shot snub nosed revolver at the time, and returned fire, prompting the attackers to flee. The death toll stood at eleven, and an injured count of fifty-eight when the chaos ended.

Larry Pratt, head of Gun Owners of America, spoke at a GOSA conference at the time of GOSA's founding, and publicly criticised the South African police chief who opposed the group.

== History ==
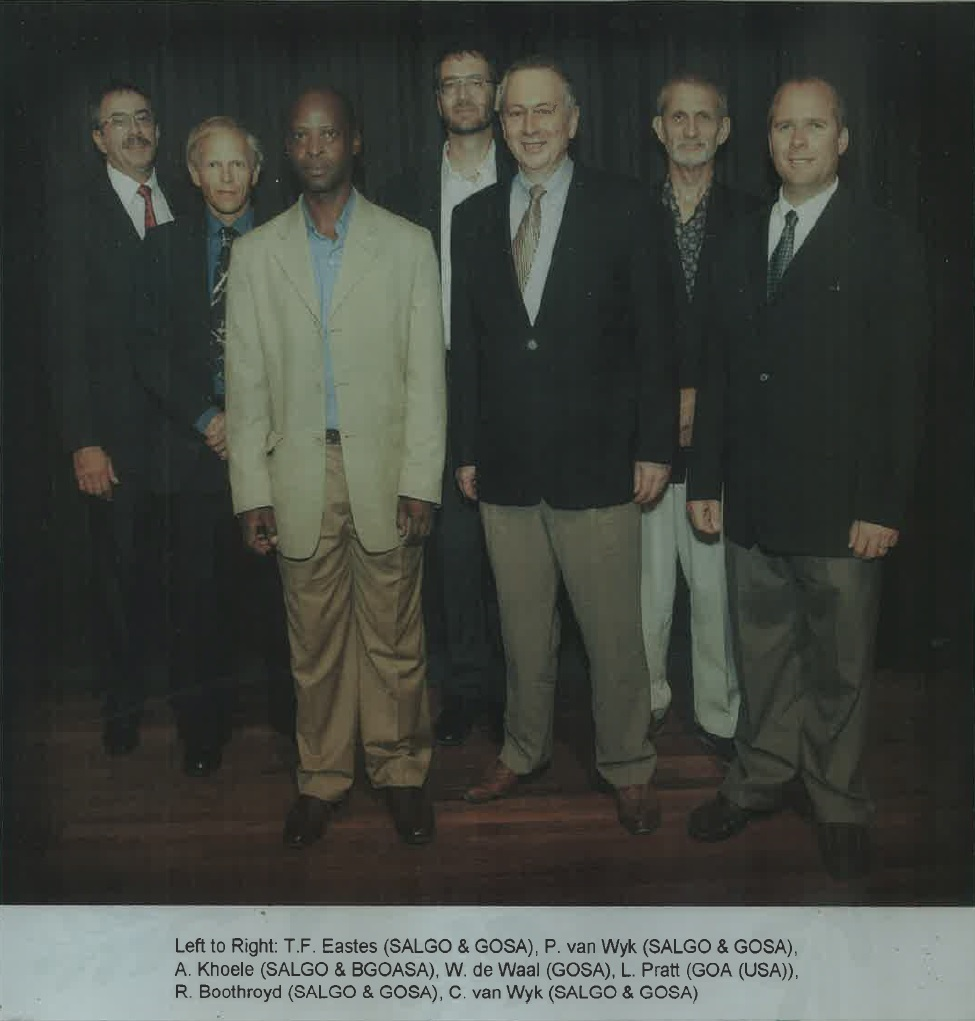
A photo taken at the founding of Gun Owners South Africa at the Parow Civic Centre in Cape Town, attended by Larry Pratt of Gun Owners of America.Left to right: T.F. Eastes, P. van Wyk, A. Khoele, W. de Waal, L. Pratt, R. Boothroyd, C. van Wyk

Gun Owners South Africa was founded in 2004 in response to disillusionment with the other established firearm rights group, the South African Gun Owners Association (SAGA). SAGA has been in existence since 1985, and is still active to present day. Coincidentally Paul Oxley was a founder of SAGA in 1985. In the years 2004 until 2014, because GOSA was a very small organisation it was not well known to the general public. But it used its limited resources to best effect via the media which was, and still is, the best way to reach the public.

In 2011, the South African homicide rate started a gradual climbing trend, and in 2013, revelations of the bad state of affairs and corruption at the Central Firearms Registry had emerged.

By 2015, the GOSA leadership had realised that disillusionment with SAGA was not going to change any time soon, and started to rapidly put in place the necessary mechanisms of moving towards a professionally organised organisation, including a paid membership structure and benefits such as legal financial insurance against firearm discharge under legal circumstances - the first paid memberships were implemented in December 2015. Other changes included a more inclusive and simplified brand name (changing from the old English and Afrikaans abbreviations "Wapeneienaars Suid Africa / Gun Owners South Africa" (WESA/GOSA), to just the English abbreviation, and a logo update. Additionally, GOSA also contributed a significant amount of funding to Dr. David Klatzow's work on the validity of ballistic fingerprinting, which delivered a scathing rebuke of the 'science' in his article "Defective Science: An Inquiry into the Validity of Ballistic Fingerprinting as a Reliable Tool and into the Feasibility of Establishing an Effective national Ballistic Imaging Database". Towards the end of 2015, it became clear that paid membership structures in their current form were inefficient and putting the finances at a deficit. They were unbundled and simplified, with the insurance offering being moved to Gunsure (a now discontinued firearm insurance firm), and the membership offerings instead reflecting discount legal services for firearm administrative matters pertaining to firearm licensing, as well as access to full legal services at a pre-negotiated rate. With the collapse of Gunsure, GOSA started to look back at bundling a reformed insurance membership option for firearm owners in January 2018.

With the start to 2017, the reformed membership structures had started turning significant profits for the organisation, and this afforded the ability to hire a small complement of full time staff, allow the funding of more travelling expenses for official business (such as flights between Pretoria and Cape Town, where the capital and parliamentary precinct are based respectively), a new website, and put a presence with a permanent stand at the Huntex firearms and hunting expo in Gauteng and the Eastern Cape. The investment in a Huntex presence dealt a negative drag to GOSA, and the leadership quickly culled the initiative before the 2018 Huntex expos went ahead. By November 2017, GOSA had stabilized the financial flows again.

In the year from January 2016 until December 2017, Facebook membership had grown from just shy of 21 000 members, to 35 000 (they now stand at over 96 000). Paid membership growth was slower, rising from zero in late 2015, to over three thousand at the end of 2017 and, as at 2021 stand at almost 10 000. In a country of between 2.5 million to 3.0 million firearm owners, these numbers are very low, and GOSA faces an uphill battle in mobilising as many as possible.

In February 2018, Jonathan Wright lodged a complaint on behalf of GOSA with the Press Council of South Africa against Jacaranda 94.2 FM after an article on the latter's website claimed that research shows people are four times more likely to have their own firearms used against them; and that having a firearm in one's home "has been proven to increase the risk of a firearm homicide or firearm suicide in the home" unless it is kept in a safe. GOSA argued that the first claim was unsubstantiated and the second was biased, and asked for Jacaranda FM to publicly retract the statements. The article was pulled once controversy surrounding the claims came about, but no reason for taking the piece down was given. The Press Ombud, Johan Retief, ruled that Jacaranda had "to publish a retraction, correction or explanation as to why the story was pulled", which is required by section 1.10 of the Press Code.

== Political activity ==
GOSA is not associated with any political parties or candidates, and opts instead to engage and lobby directly with political entities willing to engage.

On the other hand, within this sphere GOSA is diametrically opposed to the disarmament of law abiding citizens and organizations, such as Gun Free South Africa, which promote that agenda.

== Programs ==
GOSA currently runs the GOSA Girls on Fire campaign, which was started in 2016 to coincide with the 16 Days of Activism, which is aimed at teaching and increasing female participation in firearm related activities. The campaign is run by female organisers, and regularly trains new female firearm owners with carry techniques, training, and promoting firearm safety and etiquette. GOSA Girls On Fire have run basic firearms courses for an estimated 5 000 woman since then.

GOSA hosted their first Gauteng Firearms Festival in 2018, and up until the Covid 19 pandemic closed everything down had hosted Firearms Festivals in Cape Town, Port Elizabeth, Durban and Pretoria, focusing on showcasing firearm and self-defence exhibits and hosting shooting competitions and activities.

== Organisational structure ==
GOSA is a registered non-profit company in South Africa and is applying for public benefit organisation status, it is headed by a chairperson and ceo (executive positions), and a board of directors. The Board of Directors is currently composed of:

- Paul Oxley (Chairperson)
- Montenique Booley (Chief Executive Officer)
- Larry Marks (Non-Executive Director)
- Johan Schoeman (Non-Executive Director)
- Rudi Coetzee (Non-Executive Director)
- Steve Tucker (Non-Executive Director)

GOSA's organisational structure also includes numerous volunteers who operate and advocate for GOSA with no remuneration.

== See also ==
- Firearms regulation in South Africa
