= George Whitefield College =

Christian college in Cape Town, South Africa

- Established: 1989
- Chancellor: Siegfried Ngubane
- Principal: Mark Dickson
- Location: Cape Town, South Africa; 34.106°S 18.472°E
- Website: www.gwc.ac.za

George Whitefield College (abbrev GWC) is a Christian theological college in Muizenberg, Cape Town, South Africa.

== History ==
The college is named after the 18th-century English evangelist George Whitefield.

The precursor to George Whitefield College arose in the early-1970s when candidates for the CESA which is now called Reach SA Reformed Evangelical Anglican Church of South Africa ministry were trained at the Bible Institute of South Africa in Kalk Bay as they had been for many years. Bishop Bradley and other leaders of the Church became increasingly aware that future ordination candidates were not receiving adequate training and knowledge of the doctrines, practices and history of the Church of England. It was decided that these candidates would meet once a week in the library at the Institute for tuition on the Book of Common Prayer and other issues central to the CESA worship. The Rev Barry Shucksmith from the Pinelands, Cape Town congregation took these lectures in the capacity as tutor until his return to England, and to the independent Anglican church based in the UK where he was made a bishop. In 1976, Rev David Streater joined the Institute and later became warden of George Whitefield House based at that same Institute.

George Whitefield College (GWC) was established in 1989 on the initiative of Bishop Joe Bell, then presiding bishop of the Church of England in South Africa, and GWC's founding Principal was David Broughton Knox, who had been principal of Moore Theological College for 27 years.

In 1997 GWC became affiliated with Potchefstroom University for Christian Higher Education, now known as North-West University, and with David Seccombe an accredited external New Testament professor of NWU. Up until 2010, most students of GWC were also students of NWU, and although they studied at GWC with GWC’s curriculum, they were able to graduate with the Bachelor of Theology. Since January 2010, GWC has offered its own BTh program, one that has been fully accredited by the Council on Higher Education [CHE]. Since 2016 GWC has offered its own MTh (research) and since 2019 its own MTh (structured). Accreditation for its own doctoral program is being sought.

Visiting scholars spend time at GWC and conduct Post-Graduate modules: In 2011, Dr Paul Bowers (New Testament), in 2012 Dr Abel Ndjerareou (Old Testament), Dr George Athas (Hebrew), Dr Peter Bolt (New Testament) and as special guest in Feb 2013 Dr Mark Thompson, then principal elect of Moore Theological College. GWC has also employed new PhDs in a postdoc capacity resulting in the publishing of several books: Dr Vhumani Magezi on Pastoral counselling and Aids in Southern Africa (2011), and Dr Fabulous Moyo in the area of Church history in Malawi (2012). In 2023 GWC was visited by Vaughn Roberts, and by the past principal Dr David Seccombe.

GWC often hosts a 'once a year' special lecture. This can take the form of a matriculation address, or what is called the annual lecture. In October 2009 the annual lecture was given by former member of faculty Dr James Krohn on the topic of Calvin as preacher of the Word. In October 2010 Dr John Azumah delivered this lecture. In 2012 this lecture was given by Dr Ashley Null. In 2023 the matriculation address was given by Dr Gerald Bray.

George Whitefield College is a non-profit company (NPC) overseen by a Board of Directors chaired by Mr Peter Willig (previously the chair incumbent was Mr David Shaw who succeeded Mr Dale Smith). The Board ensures that its own manner of operation is compliant with any requirements set out by the various King Commissions or other statutory bodies. The Board ensures that the college's books are professionally audited each year, and that the level of governance and educational standards operates at the highest level. In 2022, GWC became a founder member of AfCAA (African council for accreditation and accountability) based in Nairobi. The Presiding Bishop of Reach SA, currently Rev. Dr. Siegfried Ngubane, is an ex-officio member of the Board of Directors, as is the principal of the college. Two other members are also placed on the board by Reach SA. The Board agreed in 2022 to create the GWC title 'chancellor' which is automatically enjoyed by the presiding bishop (this is not to be confused with the office of chancellor within the Reach SA Executive).

== Programs ==
GWC is registered with the South African Department of Higher Education and Training and is accredited by the Council on Higher Education to offer its certificate courses and degrees.

Higher Certificate in Theology (HCertTheol) (1 year full-time) This Higher Certificate in Theology is registered under the South African Qualifications Authority ID 98789, NQF Level 5. The certificate offers the option of two tracks: The General Track and The Children’s Ministry Track.

Bachelor of Theology Degree (BTh) (3 years full-time) This Bachelor of Theology degree is registered under the South African Qualifications Authority ID 61870, NQF Level 5-7.

Bachelor of Theology Honours (BThHons) (1 year full-time) GWC’s Bachelor of Theology Honours degree is registered under the South African Qualifications Authority ID 97821, NQF Level 8.

Master of Theology Degree (MTh) (2 years full-time) GWC’s Master of Theology degree is registered under the South African Qualifications Authority ID 101609, NQF Level 9.

PostGrad Diploma in Higher Theological Education GWC's PGDipTheol is offered at NQF level 8 and can be done part time. It is also offered online by the GWC's department of Education.

The college offers a selection of programmes in theology, with the core subjects being Doctrine, Biblical Languages, Church History and Biblical Theology.

Evangelical Research Fellowship (abbrev ERF) The aim of the ERF is to provide a stimulating academic environment in the Reformed tradition for students who are enrolled in PhD studies at other universities, as well as for students who are enrolled in GWC’s Bachelor of Theology Honours and Masters programmes.

Explore Correspondence Course The Explore Correspondence Course, also known as “Explore”, is an internally managed programme which has about 3000 students across about 10 African countries. The current Explore Executive is Dr Mawonga Celesi who succeeded Mr Nevil Carrington at the end of 2025. Explore comprises an 8-module distance learning programme (soon to become 6 modules) written in Africa for African people. It has been designed so that each module can be systematically completed over three months, with the option to write an examination at the end of each module. A certificate of completion is provided to each student who completes the course.

== Academic Resources ==
All courses offered by the college publish the required and recommended reading, making the college library a vital resource in the lives of every student. GWC has also acquired the use of several licensed digital libraries which students can access. As such, the paper book collection The Broughton Knox Study Centre houses an extensive collection of titles covering theology, biblical studies, history, philosophy, missiology and more. It presently holds more than 60,000 books and a plan is currently being implemented to bring it to PhD standard. Postgraduate students registered for the Evangelical Research Fellowship have access to online resources that they are able to subscribe to, such as ATLA and JSTOR.

Digital learning is increasingly a feature of the GWC educational culture. In 2026 GWC plans to roll out an online product which will enable students all over the world to enroll in 'The Higher Certificate in Bible & Ministry' (HCBM). The platform this will be offered on is Canvas. Students can access much of the recommended reading via the library website, or via the college e-system known as Nexsis, or via the college’s e-learning platform, Canvas. The college provides a Wi-Fi network for all students across the campus including the residences. Some courses are offered asynchronously which means that students can access material from any location. A computer lab is located in the Study Centre, so that no student on campus need be without computer access.

Great effort has gone into collecting original sources and tools for studying the Christian Faith. Beyond its usefulness for undergraduate study and postgraduate research, the library is a precious repository of Christian culture and learning.

== Enrollment and Graduation ==
Since it was founded in 1989, the college has enrolled students from Namibia, Angola, Zambia, Zimbabwe, Mozambique, Malawi, Tanzania, Rwanda, Burundi, Cameroon, Uganda, Kenya, Congo, the Gambia, Nigeria, Sudan, Ethiopia, UK, Germany, Canada, Chile, Norway, USA, Ireland, Bermuda and Australia.

In March 2026 GWC hosted its 36th annual graduation - now combined with its annual matriculation - at St James Church Kenilworth. The graduation speaker was Dr Jake Griesel who is a lecturer in Church History at the college. Matriculation for GWC is an event where students sign a register that shows they have entered into the growing college community.
