= Quri Kancha (Bolivia) =

Mountain in Bolivia

- Location within Bolivia

Highest point
- Elevation: 3,668 m (12,034 ft)
- Coordinates: 18°32′11″S 65°43′54″W

Geography
- Location: Bolivia, Potosí Department
- Parent range: Andes

Quri Kancha (Quechua quri gold, kancha enclosure, enclosed place, yard, a frame, or wall that encloses, also spelled Khori Cancha) is a 3,668-metre-high (12,034 ft) mountain in the Bolivian Andes. It is located in the Potosí Department, Charcas Province, San Pedro de Buena Vista Municipality.
