= Saint James Church massacre =

1993 mass killing by militants in Kenilworth, Cape Town, South Africa

Coordinates: 33°59′34″S 18°28′37″E

- Kenilworth (South Africa)
- Location: Kenilworth, Cape Town, South Africa
- Date: 25 July 1993; 33 years ago
- Weapons: Vektor R4 assault rifle, grenades
- Deaths: 11
- Injuries: 59 (including one perpetrator)
- Perpetrator: APLA
- Assailants: Sichumiso Nonxuba, Bassie Mkhumbuzi, Gcinikhaya Makoma and Tobela Mlambisa

The Saint James Church massacre was a massacre perpetrated on St James Church of England in South Africa in Kenilworth, Cape Town, South Africa, on 25 July 1993 by four members of the Azanian People's Liberation Army (APLA). Eleven members of the congregation were killed and 58 wounded. In 1998 the attackers were granted amnesty for their acts by the Truth and Reconciliation Commission.

== Massacre ==
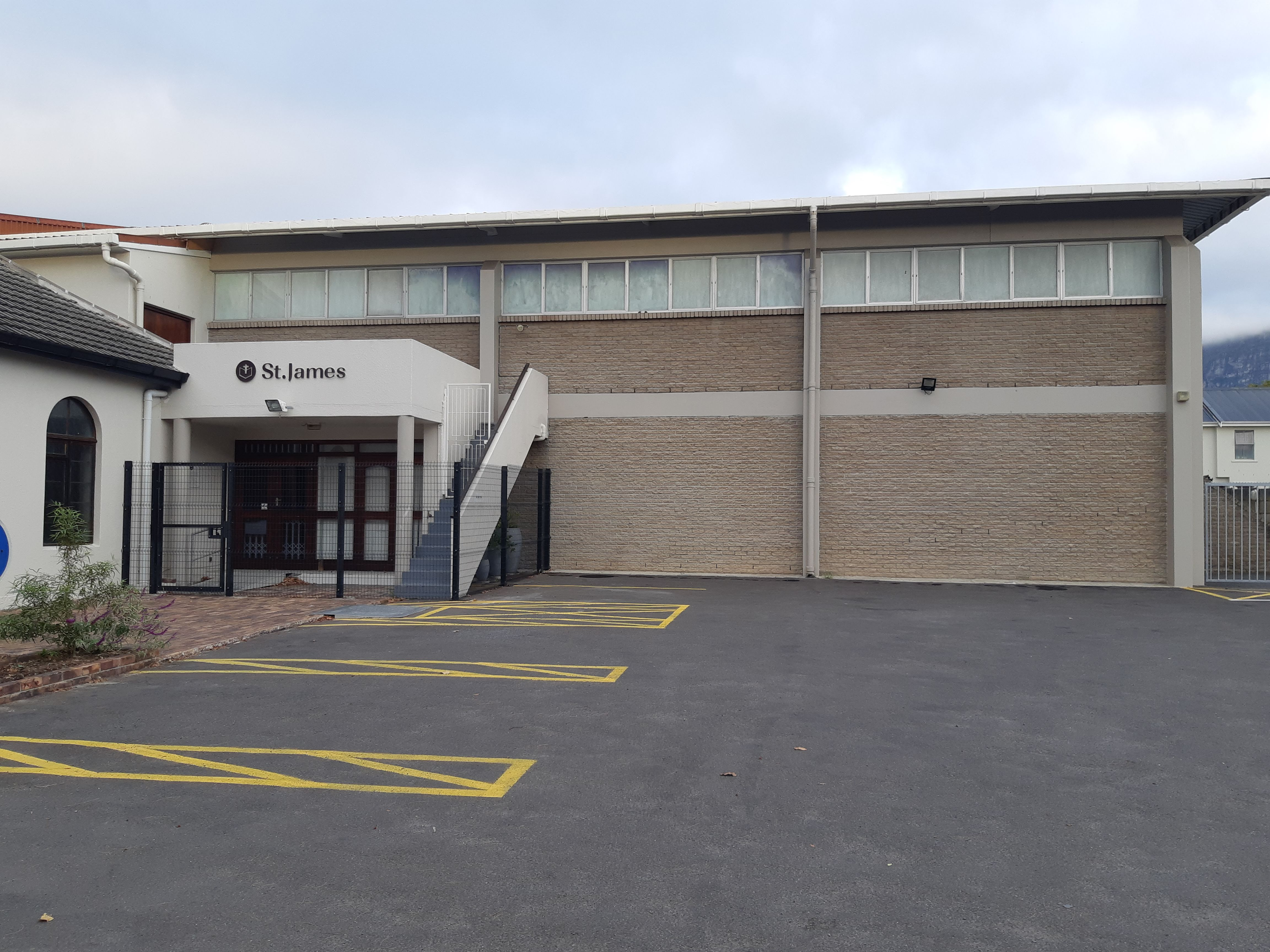
Saint James Church hall in Kenilworth. Site of the Saint James Church massacre which took place in 1993.

The attack occurred during the Sunday evening service. Sichumiso Nonxuba, Bassie Mkhumbuzi, Gcinikhaya Makoma and Tobela Mlambisa approached the church, a congregation of the Church of England in South Africa, in a vehicle stolen by Mlambisa and Makoma beforehand. Nonxuba, who commanded the unit, and Makoma entered the church armed with M26 hand grenades and R4 assault rifles. They threw the grenades and then opened fire on the congregation, killing 11 and wounding 58.

One member of the congregation, Charl van Wyk, who wrote a book about the event (Shooting Back: the right and duty of self defense), returned fire with a .38 special revolver, wounding one of the attackers. At this point they fled the church. Mkhumbuzi had been ordered to throw four petrol bombs into the church following the shooting, but abandoned this intention as all four fled in the vehicle.

Members of the congregation killed were Guy Cooper Javens, Richard Oliver O'Kill, Gerhard Dennis Harker, Wesley Alfonso Harker, Denise Gordon, Mirtle Joan Smith, Marita Ackermann, Andrey Katyl, Oleg Karamjin, Valentin Varaksa and Pavel Valuet. The last four on this list were Russian seamen attending the service as part of a church outreach programme. Another Russian seaman, Dmitri Makogon, lost both legs and an arm in the attack. The attack was seen as particularly shocking as relatively few terrorist attacks happened in the suburbs and the Cape Town area was regarded as relatively peaceful. Furthermore, the Church of England in South Africa had always been mixed-race and opposed to Apartheid. The attack was seen as harming prospects for future constitutional negotiation.

== Arrest and trial ==
Makoma was arrested ten days later and convicted for 11 murders. He was sentenced to 23 years in prison. Nonxuba, Mlambisa and Mkhumbuzi were subsequently arrested and charged in 1996. Mkhumbuzi had in the meantime joined the South African National Defence Force.

In 1997, while on trial, Nonxuba, Mlambisa and Mkhumbuzi appealed to the Truth and Reconciliation Commission for amnesty, together with Makoma. They were granted bail pending their appearance before the TRC. Nonxuba died in a car accident while on bail in November 1996.

== Amnesty ==
Notable massacres committed during Operation Great Storm by the Azanian People's Liberation Army between 1990 and 1994.

Makoma, Mkhumbuzi and Mlambisa were all granted amnesty for the St James Church attack by the Truth and Reconciliation Commission (TRC). As a result, Makoma was freed after serving 5½ years of his sentence, and the trial of Mkhumbuzi and Mlambisa was never completed. In this and other APLA amnesty hearings, APLA operatives claimed that they were following their orders and that churches were complicit in taking land from the blacks and oppressing them during apartheid.

In statements made to the representatives of St James Church, they added they were unaware the selected target was a church until they arrived in Kenilworth. Dawie Ackerman, husband of one of the victims, noted that perhaps 35–40% of the congregation were people of colour, with the counsel for the APLA saying they had assumed all congregants would be white as the church was in a white area.

Letlapa Mphahlele, national director of operations for APLA, took responsibility for ordering the attacks as part of his application for amnesty. He claimed that he had authorised attacks on white civilians following the killing of five school children by the Transkei Defence Force in Umtata.

Amnesty in such cases was typically granted in terms of the TRC's mandate because the crimes were considered politically motivated, with the perpetrators following the orders of the APLA commanders, and full disclosure was made to the TRC. Although amnesty was granted to the individual perpetrators, the TRC found the act itself, and other APLA/PAC attacks specifically targeting civilians, were "a gross violation of human rights" and a "violation of internal [sic] humanitarian law".

== Later developments ==
Several of the church members who were injured or who lost family members in the attacks, as well as Charl van Wyk, who had returned fire on the attackers, later met and publicly reconciled with the APLA attackers.

On 27 August 2002, Gcinikhaya Makoma was arrested along with six others following a cash-in-transit heist of a Standard Bank cash van in Constantia, Cape Town, in which R1.8 million was stolen. He and the others were later acquitted, with the magistrate finding that the prosecution case had been badly put together and that documents had been falsified by an investigating officer. Makoma was convicted on 16 February 2012 of murder and robbery and sentenced to life and 46 years in prison for his role in a December 2007 cash van heist in Parow, Cape Town.

In October 2004, Charl Van Wyk became a founding member of Gun Owners of South Africa (GOSA), an online civilian gun rights ownership group, which is involved in public demonstrations against the Firearms Control Act.

== See also ==
- Heidelberg Tavern massacre
- List of massacres in South Africa
- Navaly Church massacre, Sri Lanka
