= Fred Morris (bishop) =

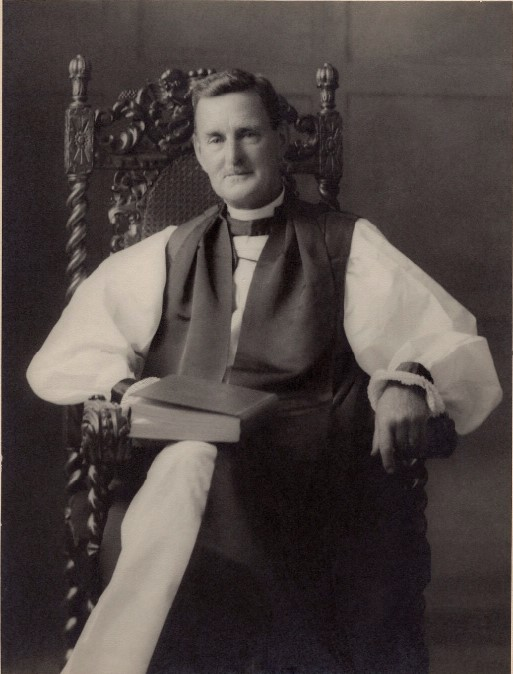
Morris, circa 1943

George Frederick Bingley Morris (1884–1965) was an Anglican Bishop of North Africa in the mid 20th century.

Morris was born in Edinburgh and educated at Queens' College, Cambridge and ordained in 1911. After a curacy at St Paul Portman Square, he became a missionary in Uganda. Moving to Morocco, he became Archdeacon of North Africa in 1936. Returning to England, he was Rector of Illogan until his elevation to the episcopate in 1943.

In 1954, he resigned as Bishop of North Africa and became the first bishop of the Church of England in South Africa in 1955: CESA was not part of the Church of England, despite its name. Geoffrey Fisher, the then Archbishop of Canterbury, described this action as putting himself "outside the fellowship of the Anglican Communion". In 1959, he consecrated Stephen Bradley as an assistant bishop, who would eventually serve as his successor; it is highly unusual for a single bishop to undertake a consecration alone.

Preceded by None	Presiding Bishop of the Church of England in South Africa; 1955–1965	Succeeded by Stephen Bradley
