= Heidelberg Tavern massacre =

Massacre of students by a terrorist group

Heidelberg Tavern Massacre
- Observatory, Cape Town (South Africa)
- Location: Observatory, Cape Town, South Africa
- Date: 31 December 1993; 32 years ago
- Deaths: 4
- Injuries: 7
- Perpetrator: APLA
- Assailants: Humphrey Luyanda Gqomfa, Vuyisile Brian Madasi and Zola Prince Mabala

The Heidelberg Tavern massacre occurred in Observatory, Cape Town on New Year's Eve (31 December) 1993. Three Azanian People's Liberation Army (APLA) operatives entered the Heidelberg Tavern and opened fire on the crowd, killing three students and the owner of an adjacent restaurant who went outside to investigate the sounds of gunfire. An unexploded bomb (with nails strapped to it) was found in the restaurant, close to the main entrance.

The attack on the tavern was planned by APLA leader Letlapa Mphahlele.

== Massacre ==
Notable massacres committed during Operation Great Storm by the Azanian People's Liberation Army between 1990 and 1994.

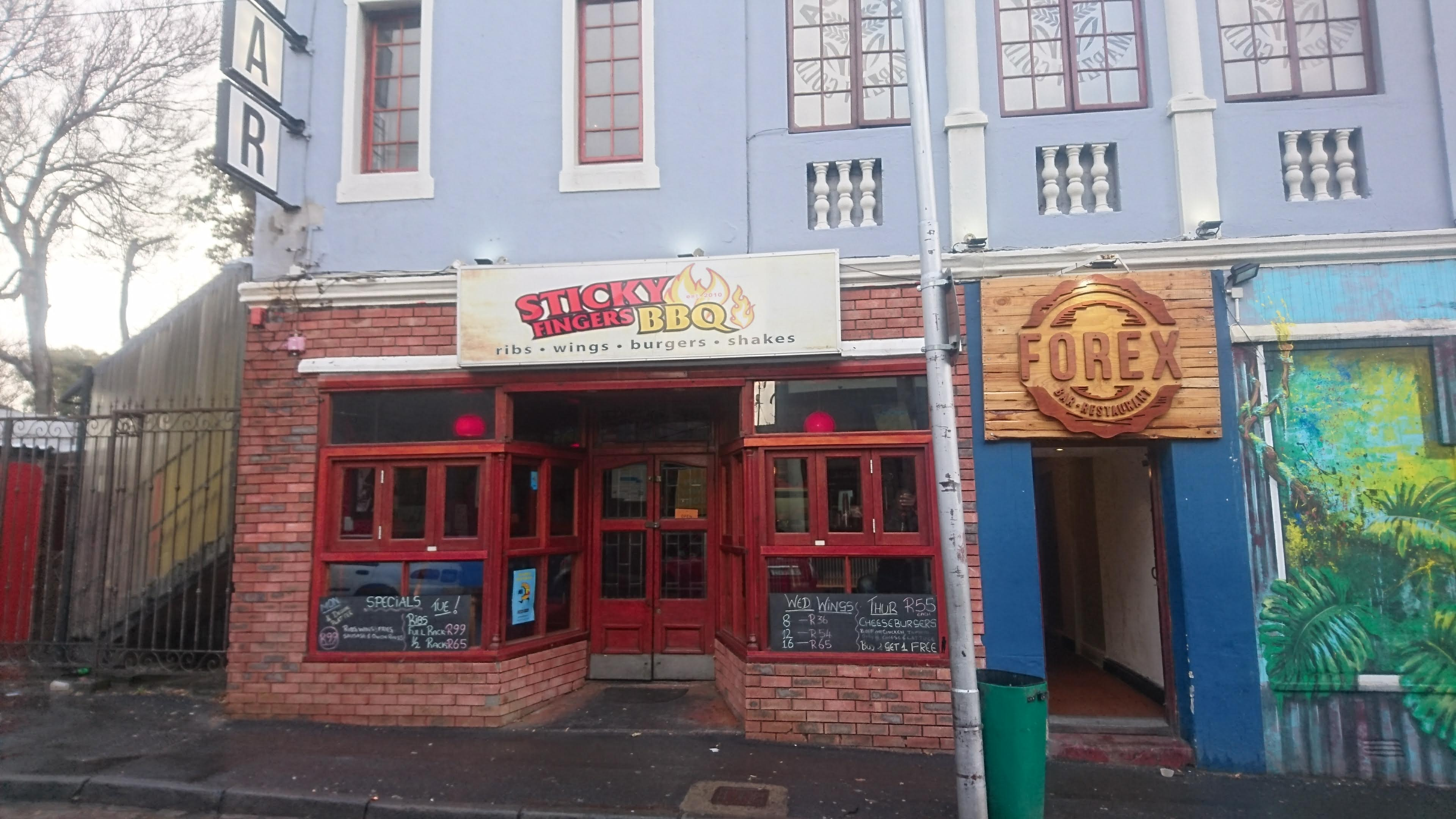
The current site of the Heidelberg Tavern massacre. Now occupied by other businesses.

During the years of apartheid, Observatory was one of the few de facto "grey" suburbs where all races lived together. On the evening of 31 December 1993, three men entered a popular student venue on Station Road, called the Heidelberg Tavern and opened fire, killing four people and injuring seven. Although APLA attacked the tavern to target white South Africans, as part of its Operation Great Storm, half of the victims killed were not white.

The three APLA operatives – Humphrey Luyanda Gqomfa, Vuyisile Brian Madasi, and Zola Prince Mabala – were convicted in November 1994 for what became known as the Heidelberg Massacre. On 16 July 1998, the Truth and Reconciliation Commission granted the three amnesty.

== Victims ==
Killed:

- Rolande Lucielle Palm, age 22, student
- Bernadette Langford, age 22, student
- Lindy-Anne Fourie, age 23, student
- Jose Cerqueira, age 35, restaurant owner

Injured:

- Michael Jacob January
- Dave Deglon
- Benjamin Braude
- Quentin Cornelius
- Justin Julian Fouche

== See also ==
- List of massacres in South Africa
