= Charcas Province =

Charcas
- Province
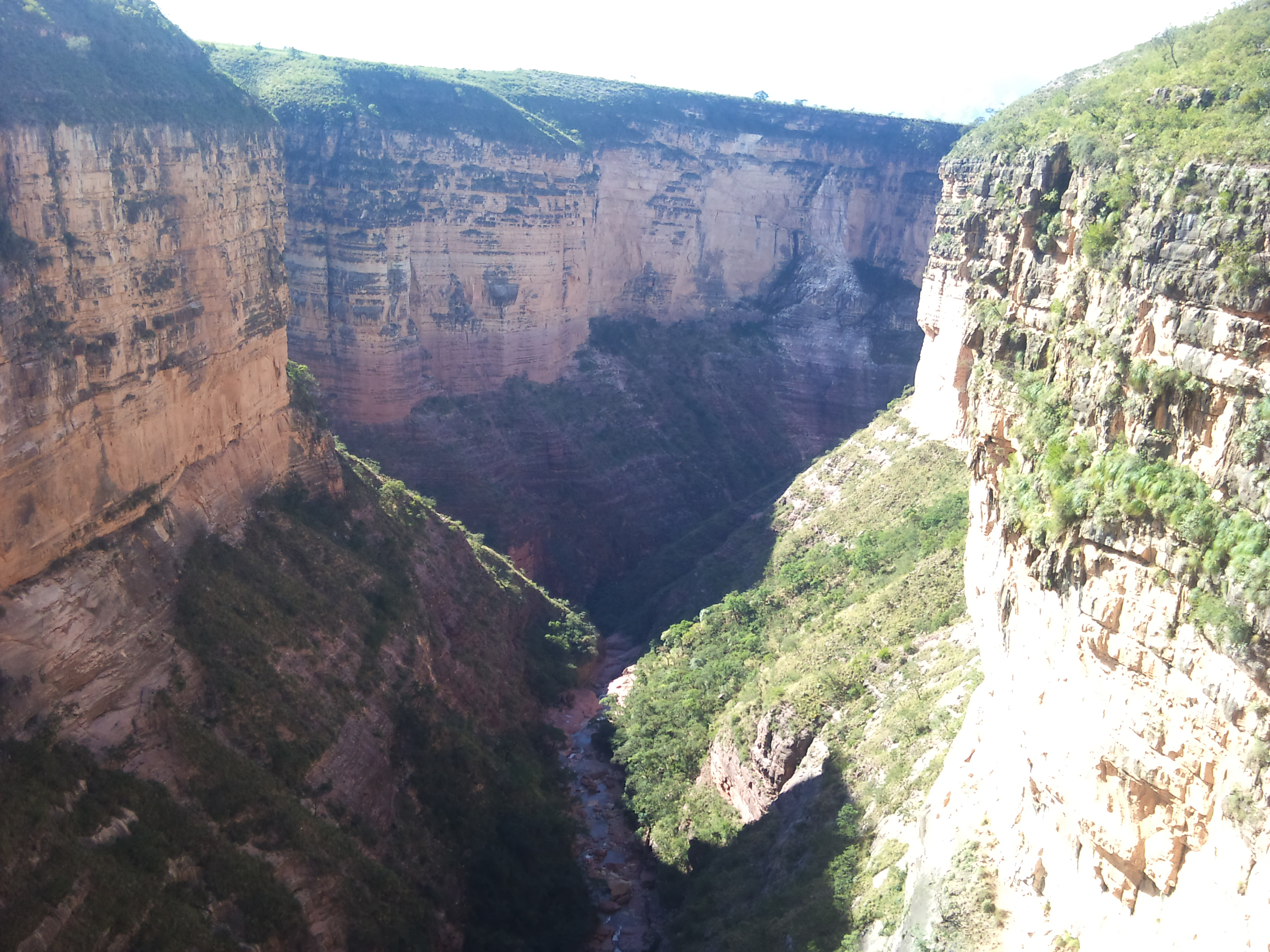
- Canyon of the Toro Toro National Park

- Flag Seal

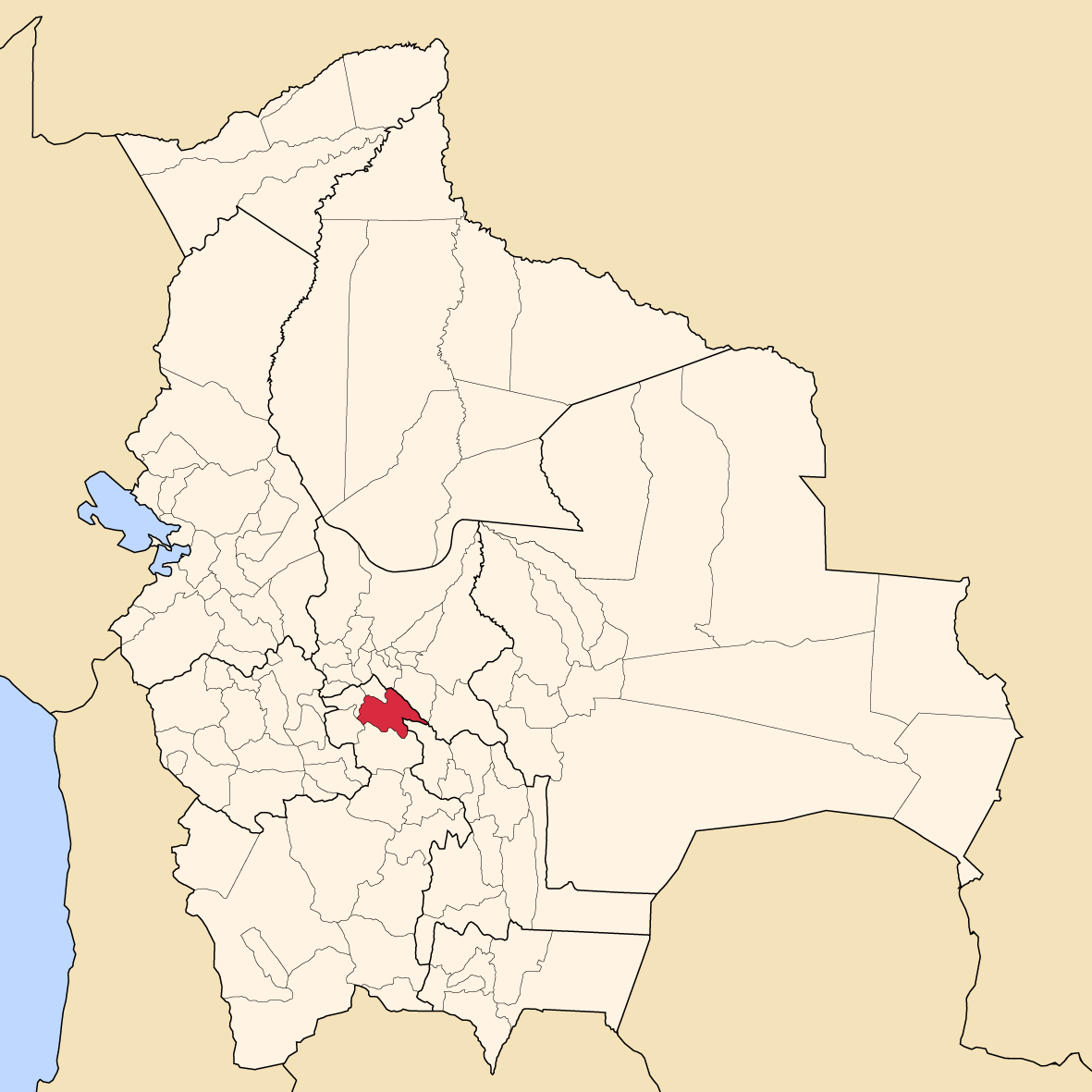
- Location of the Charcas Province within Bolivia

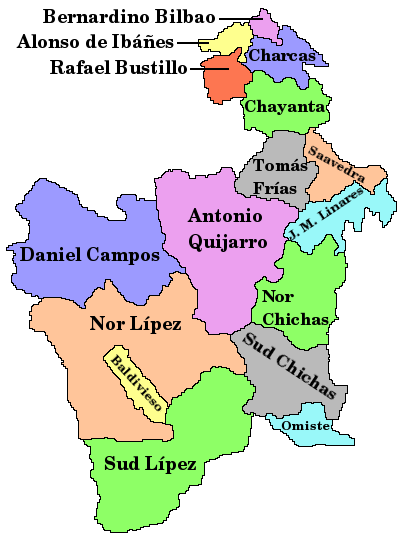
- Provinces of the Potosí Department
- Coordinates: 18°16′S 65°50′W
- Country: Bolivia
- Department: Potosí Department
- Municipalities: 2
- Cantons: 12
- Capital: San Pedro de Buena Vista

Area
  - Total: 1,306 sq mi (3,382 km^{2})

Population (2024 census)
  - Total: 38,680
  - Density: 29.62/sq mi (11.44/km^{2})
  - Ethnicities: Quechua
- Time zone: UTC-4 (BOT)
- Area code: BO.PO.CR

Charcas is a province in the northern parts of the Bolivian Potosí Department. Its capital is San Pedro de Buena Vista (955 inhabitants in 2001).

== Location ==
Charcas province is one of sixteen provinces in the Potosí Department. It is located between 17° 57' und 18° 36' South and between 65° 21' und 66° 19' West. It borders Bernardino Bilbao Province in the north, Alonso de Ibáñez Province in the northwest, Rafael Bustillo Province in the southwest, Chayanta Province in the south, and Cochabamba Department in the east.

The province extends over 125 km from East to West and 100 km from north to south.

== Division ==
The province comprises two municipalities which are further subdivided into cantons.

Section	Municipality	Seat
1st	San Pedro de Buena Vista Municipality	San Pedro de Buena Vista
2nd	Toro Toro Municipality	Toro Toro

== Population ==
The main language of the province is Quechua, spoken by 98%, while 34% of the population speak Spanish. The population increased from 31,233 inhabitants (1992 census) to 38,174 (2001 census), an increase of 22.3%. Capital of the province is San Pedro (955 inhabitants).

10% of the population have no access to electricity, 10% have no sanitary facilities. 72.0% of the population are employed in agriculture, 0.5% in mining, 12.2% in industry, 15.3% in general services. 99% of the population are Catholics.

The people are predominantly indigenous citizens of Quechua descent and descendants of the Spanish.

Ethnic group	San Pedro Municipality (%)	Toro Toro Municipality (%)
Quechua	86.5	94.2
Aymara	6.0	1.5
Guaraní, Chiquitos, Moxos	0.0	0.0
Not indigenous	7.5	4.2
Other indigenous groups	0.0	0.0

== See also ==
- Paka Chuku
- Puka Urqu
- Quri Kancha
- Toro Toro National Park
