= San Pedro de Buena Vista =

Coordinates: 18°13′S 65°59′W

- Town
- Interactive map of San Pedro de Buena Vista
- Country: Bolivia
- Time zone: UTC-4 (BOT)

San Pedro de Buena Vista is a small town in Bolivia, capital of the province of Charcas in the north of the department of Potosí.
