= Puka Urqu (Charcas) =

Mountain in Bolivia

- Location within Bolivia

Highest point
- Elevation: 2,811 m (9,222 ft)
- Coordinates: 18°31′27″S 65°40′08″W

Geography
- Location: Bolivia, Potosí Department
- Parent range: Andes

Puka Urqu (Quechua puka red, urqu mountain, "red mountain", also spelled Puca Orkho) is a 2,811-metre-high (9,222 ft) mountain in the Bolivian Andes. It is located in the Potosí Department, Charcas Province, San Pedro de Buena Vista Municipality. The Ch'alla Mayu flows along its southern slope.
