= Reformed Evangelical Anglican Church of South Africa =

Christian denomination in South Africa

- Classification: Protestant
- Orientation: Anglican
- Theology: Reformed; Confessing Movement
- Polity: Episcopal
- Presiding bishop: Siegfried Ngubane
- Associations: GAFCON
- Region: South Africa, Namibia, Zimbabwe, Malawi
- Origin: 1938
- Separated from: Anglican Church of Southern Africa (then the Church of the Province of Southern Africa)
- Congregations: 150
- Members: 100,000
- Official website: reachsa.org.za

The Reformed Evangelical Anglican Church of South Africa (REACH-SA), known until 2013 as the Church of England in South Africa (CESA), is a Christian denomination in South Africa. It was constituted in 1938 as a federation of churches. It appointed its first bishop in 1955. It is an Anglican church (though not a member of the Anglican Communion) and it relates closely to the Sydney Diocese of the Anglican Church of Australia, to which it is similar in that it sees itself as a bastion of the Reformation and particularly of reformed doctrine.

== History ==
=== Before 1938 ===
The first Church of England service on record in South Africa was conducted by a naval chaplain in 1749. After the British occupation of the Cape in 1806, congregations were formed and churches were built.

In 1847 an Anglo-Catholic bishop was appointed to lead the church. He was determined to enforce Tractarianism on the Church. There were those who preferred to follow the Reformation principles and teachings of the Church of England. Thus, when in 1870 Bishop Gray formed the Church of the Province of SA (now the Anglican Church of Southern Africa), these evangelical Anglican clergy remained outside the new body.

=== 1938–present ===
The synod of the CESA adopted the church's present constitution in 1938. The draft was prepared by Howard Mowll, the Anglican Archbishop of Sydney in Australia. The preamble and declaration of the constitution includes the following statement: "The Church of England in South Africa, as a Reformed and Protestant Church, doth hereby reaffirm its constant witness against all those innovations in doctrine and worship, whereby the primitive faith hath been from time to time defaced or overlaid, and which at the Reformation, the Church of England did disown and reject."

James Hickenbotham made an attempt to unite CESA and the Anglican Church in South Africa in 1953. Hickenbotham presented proposals, known as the Thirteen Points, as a basis for negotiation. The 1954 synod rejected the proposals as their adoption would have placed the CESA in a weakened position compared to the Anglican Church in South Africa. In 1959, Fred Morris of CESA contacted Joost de Blank, the Archbishop of Cape Town (Church of the Province of Southern Africa) suggesting that negotiations take place between the two churches with a view to reconciliation. The CPSA rejected this approach.

Stephen Bradley served as presiding bishop from 1965 to 1984: he was a supporter of apartheid. He was one of three ministers to preside at the funeral of Hendrik Verwoerd, the "Architect of Apartheid". In the 1970s and 1980s, the CESA "became a haven for conservative whites fleeing the 'liberal' positions of Desmond Tutu and others in the CPSA".

In 1984, Dudley Foord was appointed by Synod as Presiding Bishop. He was consecrated by the Archbishop of Sydney, Australia before taking up his episcopal duties in South Africa. George Alfred Swartz, the Bishop of Kimberley and Kuruman, representing the Episcopal Synod of the Anglican Church of Southern Africa, attended the consecration. Despite the conciliatory tone at Foord's consecration, the Presiding Bishop of CESA was not invited to attend the Lambeth Conference held in 1988 either as a bishop of the Anglican Church or as a bishop of a church in full communion with the Anglican denomination.

From the mid-1980s onwards, discrimination in its constitution, national structure and practices were "systematically removed". This included the passing at their 1985 synod of a statement that included the phrase: "Synod totally rejects discrimination on grounds of colour, sex or race as contrary to the Bible." In a 1999 statement to the Truth and Reconciliation Commission, future presiding bishop Frank Retief suggested the denomination's perceived support of apartheid was the result of a number of issues: believing government propaganda, its objection to liberation theology, and that they should remain "a-political" to concentrate on growing their small denomination. He also claimed that senior leaders had met with both P. W. Botha and F. W. de Klerk when they served as State President of South Africa to "express concern about the wrongs in south Africa" but hid these from local leadership and their congregations which "reinforced the view that we were supporters of the government and not critics".

On 25 July 1993, St James Church Kenilworth was attacked by the armed wing of the Pan Africanist Congress. Eleven were killed but the three attackers were later granted amnesty by the Truth and Reconciliation Commission.

In 2004, the church was described as "most theologically conservative evangelical denomination in South Africa".

At Synod 2013 The Church of England in South Africa voted to change its official operating name to The Reformed Evangelical Anglican Church of South Africa, REACH-SA. At Synod 2014 Desmond Ingelsby resigned as the presiding bishop due to bad health. Synod appointed several bishops to do the work of the presiding bishop until a presiding bishop was appointed. Glen Lyons was appointed the Chairman of the group.

=== Namibia ===
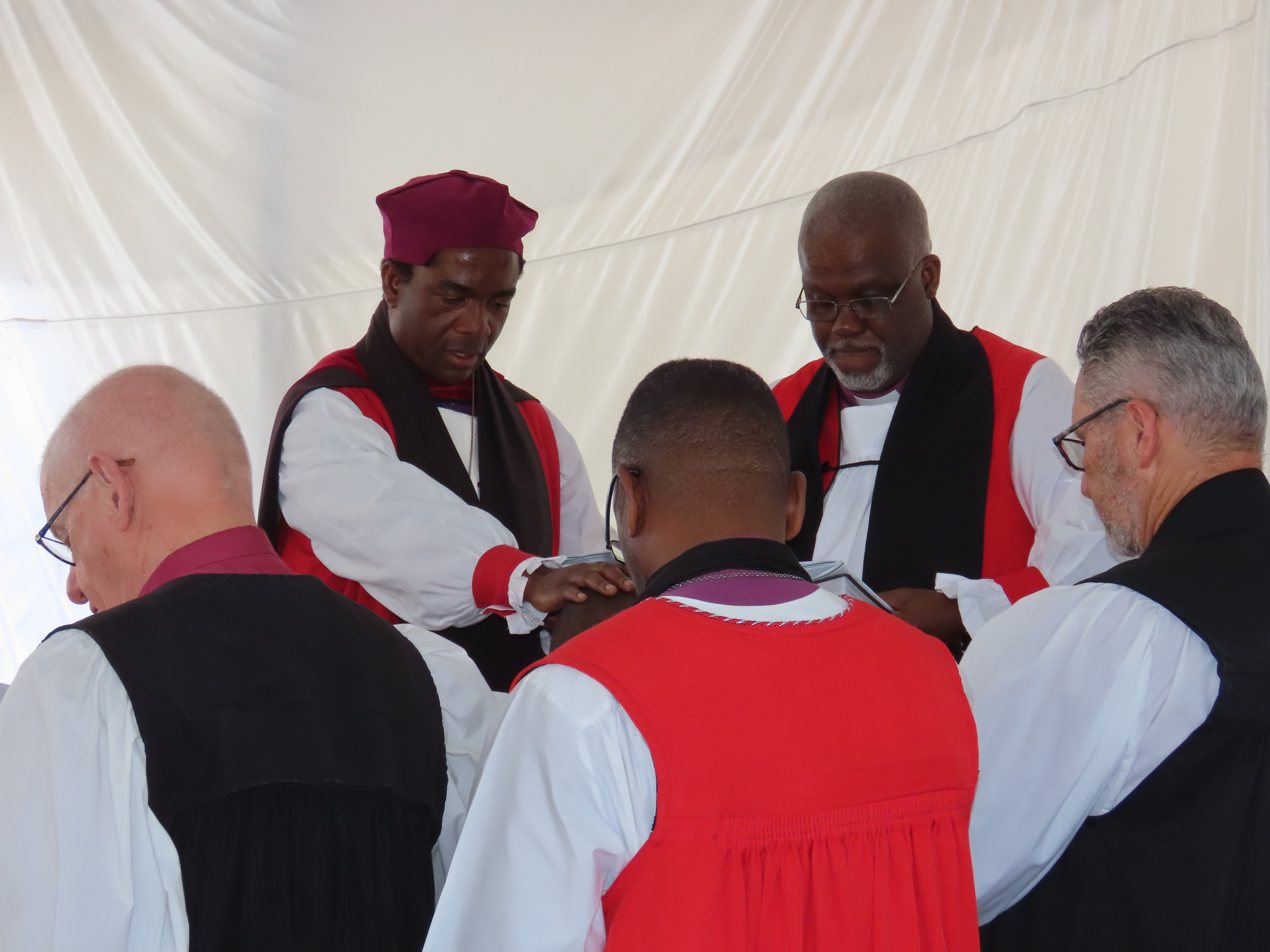
REACH-SA bishops consecrate a new bishop in Namibia

Stephen and Aura Quirk moved to Swakopmund Namibia in the 1980's, to work at Rossing Mine. They had become Christians at St. James Church, Kenilworth, Cape Town, under the preaching of Rev. Frank Retief. In Swakopmund the local church had an Arminian Pastor and Stephan found himself at odds with his teaching. Thus Stephan obtained cassette tapes of Franks sermons and bible studies and began CESA Sunday Services and Bible Studies in a garage in Swakopmund. This fledgling church was named St. Timothy's Church. In 1988 St. Timothy's called their first minister, Rev. George van der Westhuizen who was a long distance Curate under Rev. Frank Retief in Kenilworth, Cape Town. When Rev. George van der Westhuizen accepted a call to Welkom in the Free State to do his second term of Curacy in 1992 Mr Ingo van der Merwe (a youth for Christ worker) took the reins at St. Timothy's Church. George and Ingo were at Bible College together. The next minister at St Timothy's was Rev Johann van der Bijl Then Rev. George van der Westhuizen came back to St. Timothy's in 1998 In 2005, St. Timothy's Congregation Chose to leave CESA and join an American Denomination. St. Timothy's no longer exists.

Right Reverend Lukas Katenda is the current Bishop of REACH Namibia after Bishop Kalangula Peter, the first bishop.

== Organisation ==
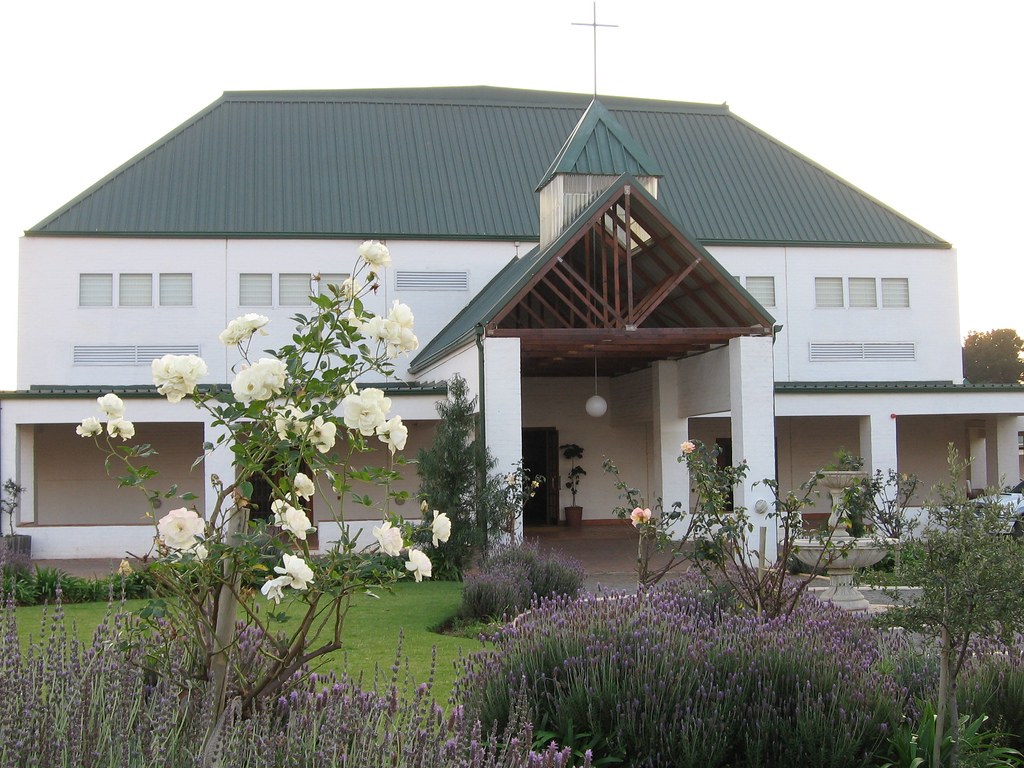
Christ Church Midrand, one of the principal churches of REACH-SA

Although REACH-SA has been excluded from the Lambeth Conference, its ministerial orders are recognised by the Anglican Communion, and these orders derive from Bishop Fred Morris, a former Anglican missionary bishop in North Africa, who moved in 1955 to South Africa, much to the irritation of the then Archbishop of Canterbury. Several REACH-SA clerics have controversially served in the Church of England.

In 2009, the denomination was composed of just under 200 congregations, with a total of about 120,000 members. All churches must contribute 10% of their income to a central fund, but in practice some churches do not. Christ Church, Midrand; Christ Church, Pinetown; and St James Church, Kenilworth all have memberships of several thousand, with attendances on Sunday morning services at about 1000. The average church size is about 150.

=== Presiding bishops ===
- G. Frederick B. Morris, (1955–1965)
- Stephen Carlton Bradley, (1965–1984)
- Dudley Foord, (1984–1987)
- Joe J. Bell, (1989–2000)
- Frank J. Retief, (2000–2010)
- Desmond Inglesby, (2010–2014)
- Glenn Lyons, (2015–2024)
- Siegfried Ngubane, (2024–present)

== Interchurch organisations ==
The Reformed Evangelical Anglican Church of South Africa was a former member of the World Reformed Fellowship However, since 2024, it is no longer listed among the organization's members.

Is a member of the Global Fellowship of Confessing Anglicans.

== Practices ==
The church's canons allow for lay presidency at Holy Communion and also the use of grape juice instead of fermented wine. All references to baptismal regeneration and absolution have been eliminated from the denomination's alternative prayer book, as has the word catholic in the creeds (Nicene Creed and Apostles' Creed).

== Training colleges ==
George Whitefield College (GWC), the official REACH-SA theological training facility in Cape Town is modelled on Moore Theological College in Sydney, Australia. The founding principal of GWC was Broughton Knox; the current principal is Mark Dickson. Another REACH-SA college is the Kwazulu-Natal Missionary Bible College (formerly known as Trinity Academy) in Pietermaritzburg, KwaZulu-Natal.

== Anglican realignment ==
The REACH-SA has been involved in the Anglican realignment and was one of the denominations that participated at the launching of the Fellowship of Confessing Anglicans in South Africa, on 3 September 2009. The Presiding Bishop of REACH-SA, Glenn Lyons, consecrated the Rev. Jonathan Pryke, of Jesmond Parish Church, as an overseas bishop, the first ever in Europe, on 2 May 2017. This was controversial due to REACH-SA's status outside of the Anglican Communion, and because the consecration occurred without the knowledge of the Bishop of Newcastle (England). It wasn't also officially sanctioned by the GAFCON UK. REACH-SA justified the consecration because their bishops "have regularly stood in to help with ordinations and other episcopal ministry to the Jesmond Parish Church due to its members being in impaired communion with their own diocesan bishop".

The REACH-SA was part of the South African delegation that attended GAFCON III on 17-22 June 2018 in Jerusalem.
