= Stephen Bradley (bishop) =

South African Anglican bishop

The Right Reverend Stephen Bradley
- Presiding Bishop
- Church: Church of England in South Africa
- In office: 1965 to 1984
- Predecessor: Fred Morris
- Successor: Dudley Foord
- Previous post: Assistant Bishop of Cape Town (1958–1965)

Orders
- Consecration: 1958 by Fred Morris

Personal details
- Born: 4 April 1909
- Died: 2 July 2003 (aged 94)
- Denomination: Anglicanism
- Education: Moore Theological College

Stephen Carlton Bradley (4 April 1909 – 2 July 2003) was an Anglican bishop. From 1965 to 1984, he served as presiding bishop of the Church of England in South Africa; despite its name, this denomination was not in communion with the Church of England. He had served as a military chaplain during the Second World War, then in parish ministry before being consecrated as an assistant bishop in 1958. He was a supporter of apartheid and against ecumenicism.

== Biography ==
Bradley was born in Cairo, Egypt, the son of missionaries with the Egypt General Mission. His family migrated to Australia when he was 9. Bradley studied at Sydney Church of England Grammar School and Moore Theological College and went to South Africa in 1935 as a missionary to Zulus.

During Second World War, Bradley served first in the South African Army, and then in the Australian Army, serving as a chaplain. He returned to South Africa after the war and served in the Church of England in South Africa; despite its name, this denomination is not in communion with the Church of England through the Anglican Communion, in contrast to the Church of the Province of Southern Africa. He was consecrated as Assistant Bishop of Cape Town in 1958. He was consecrated by Fred Morris, acting alone: this unusual act brought the charge that Bradley's consecration was irregular.

Bradley opposed the World Council of Churches, and supported apartheid.

Religious titles
Preceded by Fred Morris	Presiding Bishop of the Church of England in South Africa; 1965–1984	Succeeded by Dudley Foord
