= Lukas Katenda =

Namibian Anglican bishop

The Right Reverend Lukas Katenda
- Bishop of the Reformed Evangelical Anglican Church of Namibia
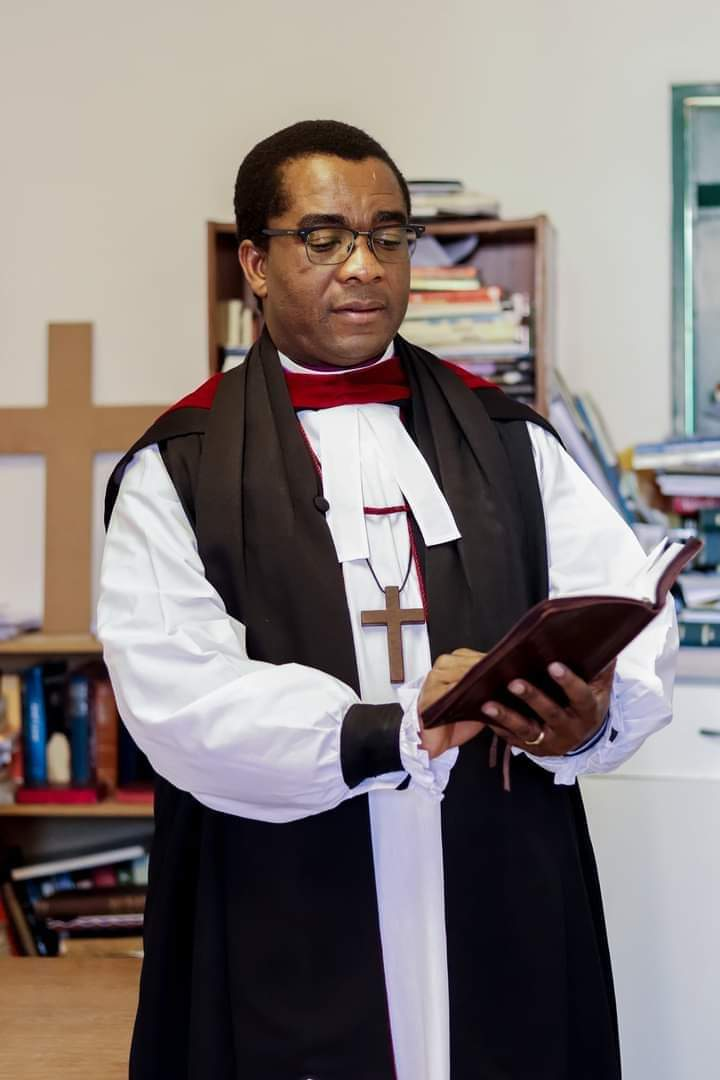
- Church: REACH Namibia
- In office: 2019–present
- Predecessor: Peter Kalangula

Orders
- Consecration: 6 October 2019 by Glenn Lyons

Personal details
- Born: July 8, 1978 (age 48) Onamutai, Oshana, Namibia
- Spouse: Aune Katenda
- Occupation: Clergymen, lecture, nurse, midwife, counselor
- Education: University of Namibia, Virginia Theological Seminary

Lukas Kaluwapa Katenda (born 1978) is a Namibian Anglican bishop. Consecrated in 2019, he is the second bishop of the Reformed Evangelical Anglican Church of Namibia (REACH Namibia). He served as a General Secretary at the Southern Anglican Diocese of Namibia in 2014.

== Public theology ==
Lukas Katenda is a cleric who is active in addressing issues affecting society in Namibia, ranging from politics to moral rights, etc.
