= List of chancellors and vice-chancellors of South African universities =

Location of South Africa

The following is a list of South African university chancellors and vice-chancellors. In most cases, the chancellor is a ceremonial head, while the vice-chancellor is chief academic officer and chief executive.

== Public universities ==
University	Chancellor	Vice-chancellor
Cape Peninsula University of Technology	Thandi Modise	Chris Nhlapho
University of Cape Town	Precious Moloi-Motsepe	Mosa Moshabela
Central University of Technology	Vincent Maphai	Pamela Dube
Durban University of Technology	Nonkululeko Nyembezi	Thandwa Mthembu
University of Fort Hare	Dumisa Buhle Ntsebeza	Sakhela Buhlungu
University of the Free State	Bonang Mohale	Hester Klopper
University of Johannesburg	Phumzile Mlambo-Ngcuka	Letlhokwa George Mpedi
University of KwaZulu-Natal	Reuel Khoza	Nana Poku
University of Limpopo	Nkosazana Dlamini Zuma	Mahlo Mokgalong
Mangosuthu University of Technology	Sandile Zungu	Nokuthula Sibiya
University of Mpumalanga	Chief Justice Mandisa Maya	Thoko Mayekiso
Nelson Mandela University	Geraldine Fraser-Moleketi	Sibongile Muthwa
North-West University	Anna Mokgokong	Bismark Tyobeka
University of Pretoria	Emeritus Justice Sisi Khampepe	Francis Petersen
Rhodes University	Judge Mbuyiseli Madlanga	Sizwe Mabizela
Sefako Makgatho Health Sciences University	Penny Moumakwa	Peter Mbati
Sol Plaatje University	Judge Steven Majiedt	Andrew Crouch
University of South Africa	Former President Thabo Mbeki	Puleng LenkaBula
University of Stellenbosch	Lesetja Kganyago	Deresh Ramjugernath
Tshwane University of Technology	Gloria Serobe	Tinyiko Maluleke
Vaal University of Technology	Vincent Zwelibanzi Mntambo	Khehla Ndlovu
University of Venda	Mojankunyane Gumbi	Bernard Nthambeleni
Walter Sisulu University	Nonkululelo Gobodo	Rushiella Songca
University of the Western Cape	Archbishop Thabo Makgoba	Robert Balfour
University of the Witwatersrand	Judy Dlamini	Zeblon Vilakazi
University of Zululand	Former Chief Justice Raymond Zondo	Xoliswa Mtose

== Private universities ==
University	Chancellor	Vice-chancellor
Monash University, South Africa campus	Alan Finkel	Ronald Weber
Cornerstone Institute	Dr John Volmink (President)	Noel Daniels (CEO)

== See also ==
- List of vice-chancellors and chancellors of the University of Pretoria
- List of chancellors of the University of Cape Town
