= Thenjiwe Meyiwa =

South African Feminist Scholar

- Born: eMahlongwa, South Africa
- Citizenship: South African
- Education: University of Zululand (BA), University of Natal (BA Hons, MA, PhD), Indumiso College of Education (Teaching Diploma), University of KwaZulu-Natal (MCom)
- Occupations: Vice-Chancellor, University of Mpumalanga (2025-present); Deputy Vice-Chancellor, Unisa (2018-2025); Institutional Registrar, DUT (2014-2018); Research Director, HSRC (2012-2014); Research Professor, Walter Sisulu University (2010-2011); Director, UKZN Centre for Gender Studies
- Known for: African Feminisms, Indigenous Knowledge Systems, Cultural constructions of gender
- Title: Vice-Chancellor of University of Mpumalanga
- Awards: Unisa Research and Innovation Awards (2023), South African Women in Science Awards (SAWiSA), NSTF-South32 Awards nomination

Thenjiwe Meyiwa is a South African feminist scholar, social scientist, and higher education leader known for her work in gender studies, indigenous knowledge systems, and academic administration. She currently serves as the Vice-Chancellor of University of Mpumalanga, a position she assumed on 1 October 2025.

== Early life and education ==
Her basic education schooling was done in eMahlongwa a rural village south of Durban. She then further her education which she did her Bachelor of Arts from the University of Zululand, a Bachelor of Arts Honours Degree, a Master of Arts, and a Doctor of Philosophy in Feminist Oral Studies from the former University of Natal (UKZN). She also holds a three-year teaching Diploma from the former Indumiso College of Education (DUT) and a Master of Commerce Degree in Organisational and Systems Management from the University of KwaZulu-Natal.

== Career ==
Thenjiwe Meyiwa is currently serving as the Vice Chancellor of the University of Mpumalanga, a position she has held since October 2025. She was the Deputy Vice-Chancellor: Research, Postgraduate Studies, Innovation and Commercialisation at the University of South Africa (UNISA) from 2018 to 2025.

She also served as Institutional Registrar at Durban University of Technology (DUT) from 2014 to 2018.

She served as a Research Director at Human Sciences Research Council (HSRC) from 2012 to 2014.

She was also a Research Professor at Walter Sisulu University from 2010 to 2011.

She also served as a Director at the University of KwaZulu-Natal's Centre for Gender Studies.

Meyiwa is also a renowned feminist scholar, focusing on areas like African Feminisms, Indigenous Knowledge Systems, and Cultural constructions of gender. She's passionate about transforming higher education and empowering women through education.

== Awards and recognitions ==
She received the Unisa Research and Innovation Awards in 2023, She was recognized for her research excellence at the University of South Africa (Unisa).

Meyiwa was among the Unisa's women academics and students who were celebrated by the South African Women in Science Awards (SAWiSA) for their excellence in STEM fields.

She was also among the Seven Unisa academics who were nominated for their contributions to science, engineering, and technology by the NSTF-South32 Awards.

She's also known as a feminist scholar who is focusing on African Feminisms, Indigenous Knowledge Systems, ad Cultural constructions of gender.
