= Conny Nxumalo =

South African social worker (1967–2020)

- in 2015
- Born: Constance Glerah Nxumalo; 18 February 1967; Rolle, South Africa
- Died: 22 August 2020 (aged 53); Pretoria, South Africa
- Other names: Connie Nxumalo, Sesi Connie, Sis Conny
- Occupation(s): Social worker, government official

Constance Glerah "Conny" Nxumalo (18 February 1967 – 22 August 2020) was a South African social worker and government official, sometimes referred to as "South Africa's Chief Social Worker".

== Early life ==
Constance Glerah Nxumalo was born in Rolle, Mpumalanga province, the daughter of Anny, and the stepdaughter of Ezrom Makhubela. Her mother was a teacher; her stepfather was a school principal. She earned a degree in social work at University of Limpopo in 1989. She later earned a master's degree in management at the University of the Witwatersrand.

== Career ==
Nxumalo worked as a social worker in Gazankulu after college. Her experience working in the Black-only state under apartheid helped her contribute to the new government after 1994. She helped to write legislation on social services, especially those serving Black children, women, families, and seniors. She became director of the Mpumalanga Ministry of Social Development, and later national head of the Families and Social Crime Prevention Department. She contributed to national policies focused on the foster care system, substance abuse treatment, and domestic violence prevention.

In 2013 she was appointed deputy director-general of welfare services in the Department of Social Development. She was sometimes referred to as "South Africa's Chief Social Worker." In 2016, she spoke at a United Nations symposium on violence against women, held in Pretoria. In early 2020, she was involved in helping South African nationals return to South Africa during travel restrictions and border closures due to the COVID-19 pandemic.

== Personal life ==
Nxumalo had three daughters. Conny Nxumalo died in Pretoria in August 2020, from coronavirus. She was 53 years old. In addition to her government work, she was working on a doctorate in social work at the University of the Witwatersrand. Rory Truell, the secretary-general of the International Federation of Social Workers, sent a statement to her memorial service reading, in part, "Her championing of child protection and commitment to stop violence against women acted as a role model for governments around the globe. The lives of many people are better because of Conny Nxumalo, the profession of social work is stronger because of Conny Nxumalo."
