= Debra Meyer =

South African Academician

Vice Chancellor of Sol Plaatje University
- Incumbent
- Assumed office January 1, 2026
- Preceded by: Andrew Crouch

Personal details
- Education: University of Johannesburg; University of California

Debra Meyer is a South African professor of biochemistry and the 3rd vice chancellor of Sol Plaatje University. She was formerly deputy vice-chancellor for Research, Innovation, and Postgraduate Studies in the institution.

== Education ==
Meyer obtained her master's degree in Biochemistry and her PhD from the University of California, with specialization in Biochemistry and Molecular Biology.

== Career ==
Meyer began her academic career in 1997 as a lecturer and researcher in biochemistry at Rand Afrikaans University, which later became the University of Johannesburg. In 2007, she was appointed professor and head of the Department of Biochemistry at the University of Pretoria. She subsequently returned to the University of Johannesburg, where she served as executive dean of the Faculty of Science. Before assuming responsibility for Research, Innovation and Postgraduate Studies at SPU, she held the position of deputy vice-chancellor for Teaching and Learning.
