= Mahlo Mokgalong =

South African Academician

- Born: 1954 (age 71–72); Ga-Masemola, Limpopo, South Africa
- Education: University of the North
- Known for: First substantive Vice-Chancellor and Principal of the University of Limpopo
- Scientific career
- Fields: Parasitology
- Institutions: University of Limpopo

Mahlo Mokgalong is a South African academic and parasitologist who served as the Vice-Chancellor and Principal of the University of Limpopo. He was appointed the university's first substantive Vice-Chancellor and Principal in August 2006 after serving as acting and interim Vice-Chancellor from 2003.

== Early life and education ==
Mokgalong was born in 1954 at Ga-Masemola, a village in Limpopo Province, South Africa.He attended Hwiti High School before enrolling at the then University of the North (now the University of Limpopo), where he obtained a Bachelor of Science degree in Biological Sciences. He later completed BSc Honours, Master's and PhD degrees in Parasitology at the same institution.

== Academic career ==
Mokgalong joined the staff of the University of the North as a research assistant in 1977 and later served as lecturer, senior academic, Deputy Dean and Executive Dean of the Faculty of Science and Agriculture.

== Vice-Chancellorship ==
Mokgalong became Acting Vice-Chancellor of the University of Limpopo in 2003 and was appointed the institution's first substantive Vice-Chancellor and Principal in August 2006.

During his tenure, he oversaw the merger between the University of the North and the Medical University of Southern Africa (MEDUNSA), which resulted in the formation of the University of Limpopo as a multi-campus institution.

He remained Vice-Chancellor until his retirement, after which the University Council announced the appointment of Jeffrey Mabelebele as his successor, effective 1 January 2026.

== See also ==
- University of Limpopo
- Jeffrey Mabelebele
- Higher education in South Africa
