= Jeffrey Mabelebele =

South African Academic

Vice-Chancellor of the University of Cape Town
- Incumbent
- Assumed office 01 January 2026.

Personal details
- Education: University of Limpopo
- Occupation: Academic
- Profession: Academic

Jeffrey Mabelebele is a South African Vice-Chancellor and Principal of the University of Limpopo.

== Career ==
The University of Limpopo announced the appointment of Jeffrey Mabelebele as the new Vice-Chancellor and Principal, effective January 1, 2026. He succeeds Professor Mahlo Mokgalong, who has served as Vice-Chancellor for over 20 years. Before his appointment, Mabelebele served as Registrar and Acting Deputy Vice-Chancellor at Sefako Makgatho Health Sciences University. He also served as the Chief Executive Officer of Higher Education South Africa (HESA), now Universities South Africa (USAf).
