= Thoko Mayekiso =

South African Academician

University of Mpumalanga

Founding Vice-Chancellor and Principal
- In office 1 November 2014 – October 2025

Personal details
- Born: Lusikisiki, Eastern Cape, South Africa
- Education: University of Fort Hare (BA, BA Hons, MA) Free University of Berlin (DPhil)
- Occupation: Psychologist, academic administrator

Thokozile "Thoko" Mayekiso is a South African psychologist and academic administrator who served as the founding Vice-Chancellor and Principal of the University of Mpumalanga (UMP) from 1 November 2014 to October 2025.

== Early life and education ==
Mayekiso was born in Mcobotini near Lusikisiki in the Eastern Cape, South Africa, into a family of educators. Her father, Sitututu Upington Mayekiso, was a high school principal, and her mother, Nozipho Muriel Mayekiso, came from Qumbu. She received her BA Honours, and MA in Psychology from the University of Fort Hare. She earned a DPhil in Psychology (cum laude) from the Free University of Berlin in Germany.

== Academic career ==
Mayekiso began her career as a senior lecturer in Psychology at the former University of Transkei (now part of Walter Sisulu University), rising to associate professor, full professor, Head of Department, and Vice-Dean of Arts. From 2007, at Nelson Mandela University, she was appointed as the Dean of the Faculty of Arts and then Deputy Vice-Chancellor for Research and Engagement until 2014. In the same year, she was appointed as the Vice Chancellor of UMP from its founding, starting with temporary facilities and growing it to multiple campuses in Mbombela and Siyabuswa.

== Research and honours ==
Mayekiso's research focuses on psychology, including HIV/AIDS, poverty, adolescent adjustment, and child abuse. She holds a C3 rating from the National Research Foundation (2013–2024). In 2025, she received the ENACTUS Champion Award for leadership. She is a member of the Academy of Science of South Africa.
