= Flip Smit =

South African demographer

- Born: June 22, 1936 (age 90)
- Education: University of Stellenbosch; Unisa
- Occupation: Demographer

Flip Smit is a South African demographer and former Vice Chancellor and Principal of the University of Pretoria. His research on the urbanisation of the black population in South Africa in the early 1980s provided scientific proof that separate development (apartheid), as applied by the Government of the day, was not sustainable.

== Biography ==
From 1966 to 1971 Smit was a researcher and later the head of research at the Africa Institute of South Africa. At the request of the South African Government, he and Prof G.M. Leistner conducted a feasibility study on relocating Malawi's capital to Lilongwe. In 1972, he became a professor and head of Department of Geography at University of South Africa.

Smit served as senior deputy president at the Human Sciences Research Council before his appointment as Vice Chancellor and Principal of the University of Pretoria in 1992. After a five-year term, he returned to his research in demography and retired in 2000. He is the author or co-author of six books and more than 120 articles published in scientific journals.

== Education ==
Smit earned his master's degree in geography from the University of Stellenbosch in 1961 and his Ph.D. from the University of South Africa in 1965.

== Research ==
Smit's key research contributions were in demographics focusing on population migration and the urbanisation of the black population in South Africa. His findings provided guidelines for socio-political planning by the government and private institutions, but as far back as the early eighties, provided scientific proof that separate development (apartheid), as applied by the government of the day, was not sustainable. His knowledge of demographics also enabled Smit to play an important role in establishing the nine provinces of South Africa and the drawing of their boundaries in 1993. In addition to research in demography he also undertook research on higher education.

== Awards and accolades ==
Smit has received numerous awards, including the Percy Fox Foundation Award for outstanding contributions in migration, urbanisation, and housing. He was also honored with the Vice Chancellor's medal for outstanding contributions to the University of Pretoria and a medal as one of the University's 100 leading minds. He holds honorary doctorates from the University of Pretoria, the University of Stellenbosch and the Moscow Business University.

== See also ==
- List of Chancellors and Vice-Chancellors of the University of Pretoria
