= List of chancellors and vice-chancellors of the University of Pretoria =

These are the former and present vice-chancellors and chancellors of the University of Pretoria, South Africa.

== Vice-chancellors ==
The vice-chancellor and principal is the head of the university, supported by four deputy vice-chancellors. Former and current persons who have fulfilled the position are:

- A C Paterson: 1918–1924
- N M Hoogenhout:1925–1927
- A E du Toit:1927–1934
- C F Schmidt:1935–1940
- M C Botha:1941–1947
- C H Rautenbach:1948–1970
- E M Hamman:1970–1981
- D M Joubert: 1982–1991
- Flip P Smit: 1992–1996
- J van Zyl: 1997–2001
- Calie Pistorius: 2001–2009
- Cheryl de la Rey: 2009–2018
- Tawana Kupe: 2019–2024
- Francis Petersen: 2024

== Chancellors ==
The Chancellor is the titular head of the university. Former and current persons who have fulfilled the position are:

- Justice Tielman Roos, Supreme Court of Appeal and South African Minister of Justice: 1930 – 1932
- Rev Adriaan Louw: 1933 – 1934
- Dr Hendrik van der Bijl, engineer and industrialist, founding chairman of Eskom and founder of ISCOR: 1934 – 1948
- Advocate Charles Theodore Te Water, South African diplomat and President of the League of Nations: 1949 – 1964
- Dr Hilgard Muller, Mayor of Pretoria and Minister for Foreign Affairs: 1965 – 1984
- The Honourable Alwyn Schlebusch, Minister of Public Works and Immigration, Minister of Justice and Internal Affairs, Minister in the Office of the President and South Africa's only Vice State President: 1984 – 1986
- Dr Anton Rupert, South African entrepreneur, conservationist and billionaire : 1987 – 1992
- Dr Chris Stals, Governor of the South African Reserve Bank and multiple company directorships: 1992 – 2005
- Prof Wiseman Nkuhlu, South Africa's first black chartered accountant, economic advisor to the President, Chairman for the NEPAD steering committee, Chairman of the Development Bank of Southern Africa and multiple company directorships: 2006
- Justice Sisi Khampempe current

== See also ==
- List of South African university chancellors and vice-chancellors
