= Priscillah Mabelane =

South African accountant

Priscullah Mabelane
- Citizenship: South African
- Education: University of Limpopo University of KwaZulu Natal( Bcom Honours in Accounting
- Occupations: Chartered accountant, Business Executive
- Known for: First woman to head a multinational Company in south Africa's Oil industry
- Title: Executive Vice President : Energy Business Sasol

Priscillah Mabelane is a South African chartered accountant. She is known to be the first woman in the history of South Africa’s oil industry to head a multi-national company. In August 2017, she was appointed the chief executive officer(CEO) of BP Southern Africa (BPSA), making her the first female to hold such a position. She is currently the Executive Vice President: Energy Business of Sasol, since 1 September 2020.

== Early years and Education ==
She grew up in Mabocha, near Burgersfort in Limpopo. She had her tertiary education at the University of the North, now the University of Limpopo and the University of KwaZulu Natal. She is a qualified chartered accountant with Bcom Honours in accounting.

== Career ==
Mabelane was appointed the Executive Vice President: Energy Business of Sasol in September 2020. Mabelane joined BP in 2011 and served as Chief Financial Officer(CFO) until her appointment as CEO. Prior to that, she worked in a number of large South African companies serving in various roles, including Airports Company of South Africa (ACSA), where she served as CFO; Ernst & Young, where she served as a tax director; and Eskom, where she held various roles in finance, tax and general management. She is known to have recently served as Operations Director for BP’s UK retail business.

== Personal life ==
She is a mother of one daughter.
