= Xoliswa Mtose =

Xoliswa Mtose is a South African academic and university administrator. She is Vice Chancellor of the University of Zululand.

== Life ==
Xoliswa Mtose was deputy vice-chancellor for teaching and learning at Unizulu in October 2014, when Fikile Mazibuko resigned as Unizulu vice-chancellor. The university council appointed her acting vice-chancellor until the position was filled. A shortlisting panel, to which Mtose herself was appointed, found five candidates did not meet minimum requirements for the post. The remaining four candidates were subsequently rejected. In January 2016 Mtose was interviewed as the only candidate for the vacant vice-chancellorship, and then appointed.

In September 2016 Mtose was criticized for spending university funds on an off-campus residence in Mtunzini, for furnishing her residence expensively, for travelling to the United States while the university was closed after staff protests over low salaries, and for receiving a performance bonus in the absence of a pre-existing bonus policy. In September 2017 a former Unizulu academic made allegations of corruption and maladministration against Mtose.

In 2019 Mtose was assigned bodyguards, after the murder of Gregory Kamwendo, dean of the faculty of arts, allegedly for refusing to approve sub-standard dissertations.

In March 2020 Mtose faced student protests calling for her removal. Nomarashiya Caluza, chair of the university council, defended Mtose:

Professor Mtose has managed to take the institution from a state of flux, limping from one administrator to the next, to a stable institution. Her focus on academic excellence has led to an increase in staff with PhDs from 30% in 2015 to 50% in 2020.

== Works ==
- (with Kevin Durrheim and Lyndsay Brown) Race trouble: race, identity and inequality in post-apartheid South Africa. Lanham: Lexington Books, 2011.
