= Rushiella Nolundi Songca =

South African Academics

- Occupations: Academic, university administrator
- Organization: Walter Sisulu University
- Title: Vice-Chancellor and Principal
- Predecessor: Mondli Mandela

Academic background
- Education: University of Lesotho (BA) University of Natal (LLB, LLM) Georgetown University Law Center (LLM) University of Pretoria (LLD)

Rushiella Nolundi Songca is a South African legal scholar, and university administrator who served as the Vice-Chancellor and Principal of Walter Sisulu University from 2021 to 2026. She was the institution's first female vice-chancellor. She is an admitted advocate of the High Court of South Africa and a National Research Foundation-rated researcher.

== Early life and education ==
Songca obtained a BA (Law) degree from the University of Lesotho. She earned her Bachelor of Laws (LLB) and Master of Laws (LLM) from the University of Natal, a second LLM from Georgetown University Law Center in the United States, and a Doctor of Laws (LLD) in 2003 from the University of Pretoria, with her doctoral research specializing in children's rights.

== Academic career ==
Songca's has nearly three decades of career in the field of academics. Between June 2012 to July 2017, She served as Dean of the College of Law at the University of South Africa (Unisa).

== Administrative career ==
Songca was appointed Vice-Chancellor and Principal of Walter Sisulu University on 21 December 2020, succeeding Mondli Mandela, with her term commencing on 1 April 2021. She was inaugurated on 9 October 2021 at the university's Zamukulungisa site.
