= University of Mpumalanga =

Public university in Mbombela, South Africa

Coordinates: 25°26′11″S 30°58′54″E

- Universiteit van Mpumalanga (Afrikaans)
- Motto: Creating Opportunities
- Type: Public university
- Established: 2014
- Chancellor: Mandisa Maya
- Vice-Chancellor: Thoko Mayekiso (from 2025)
- Location: Mbombela, Mpumalanga, South Africa
- Campus: 1 urban and 1 suburban campuses
- Website: www.ump.ac.za

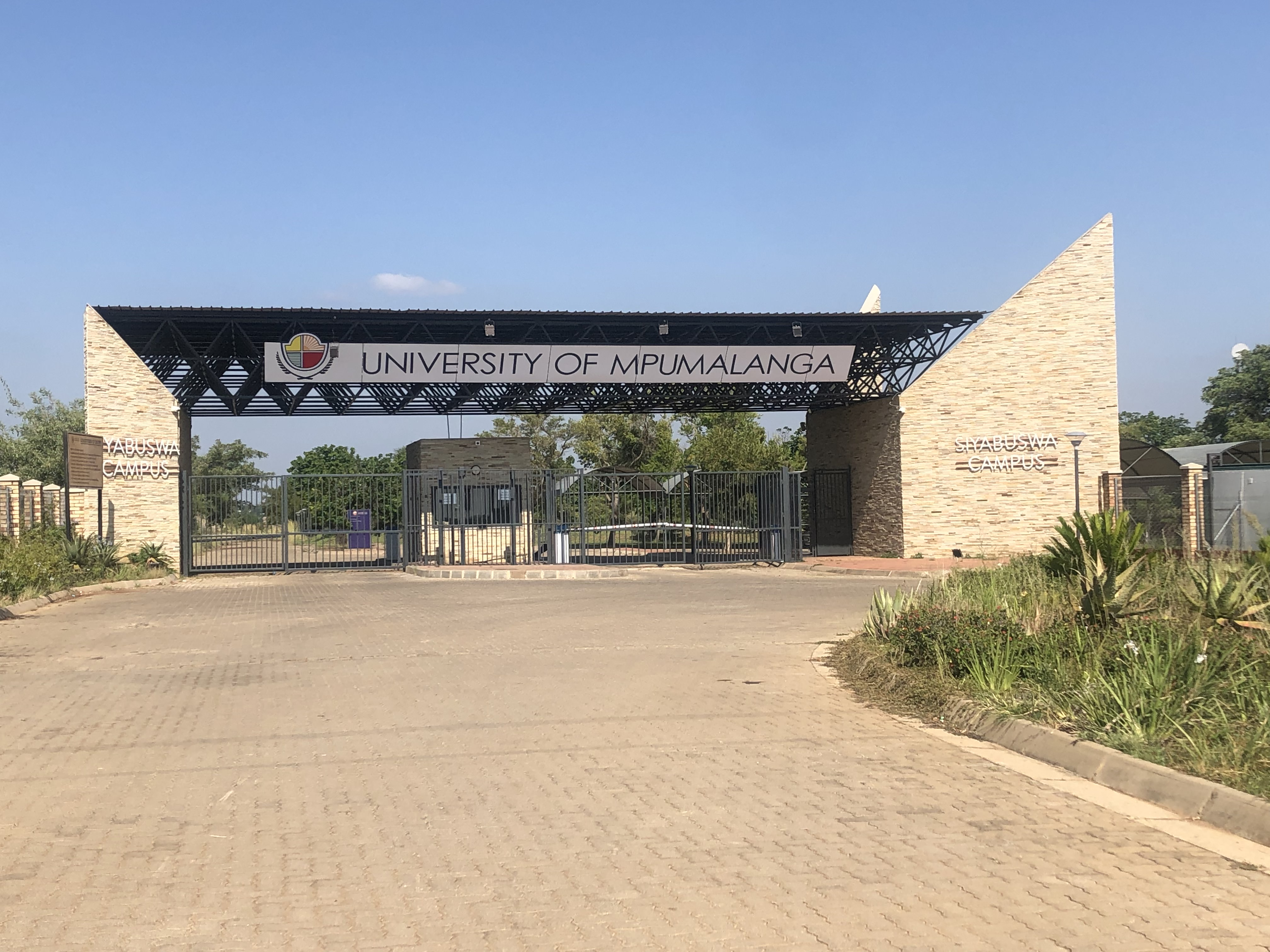
Main gate of the University of Mpumalanga, Siyabuswa Campus.

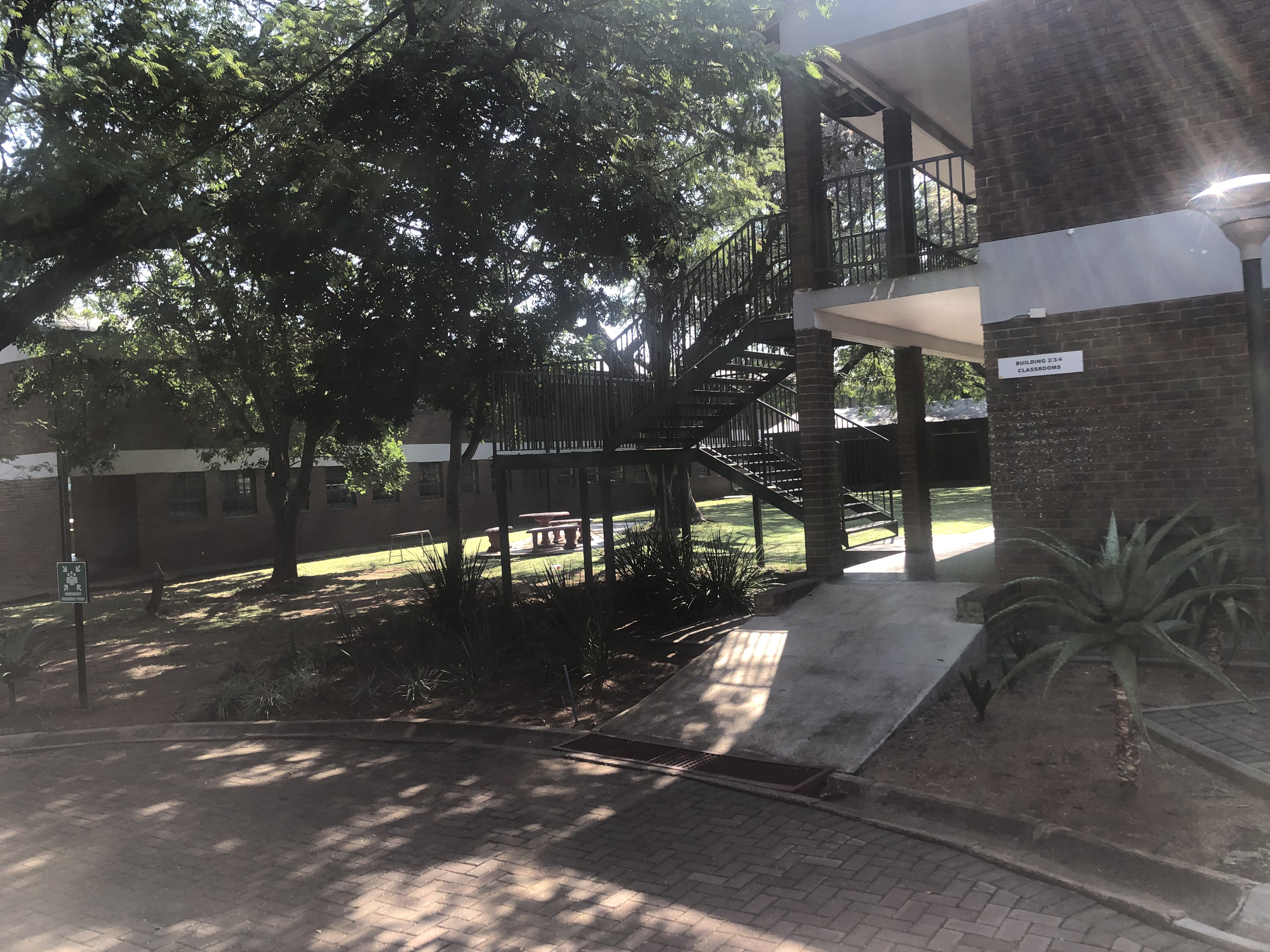
Building 7 Classrooms, Siyabuswa Campus.

University of Mpumalanga is based in Mbombela and in Siyabuswa, South Africa. It was established in 2014, initially accommodating a modest intake of one hundred and forty students.

It incorporates the infrastructure of three existing institutions – the Lowveld College of Agriculture, the hospitality school at KaNyamazane and the Siyabuswa Education Campus. It currently offers the Bachelor of Education and Bachelor of Agriculture degrees, as well as a Diploma in Hospitality Management. The interim Council Head is Dr. Ramaranka A Mogotlane, FRCPS(Glas), FRCS(Edin), previously Head of the Department of Anatomy at both the University of Natal and MEDUNSA.

It is one of two new universities in South Africa, the other being Sol Plaatje University (previously provisionally known as the University of the Northern Cape) in Kimberley.

== History ==
In 1996 the University Education Committee and the University Technikon Education Collaboration Committee merged and were tasked to pursue the establishment of a university in the Province by the former MEC for Education, Mr D D Mabuza. The National Institute for Higher Education (Mpumalanga), established in 2006, under the leadership of the late Prof C C Mokadi coordinated the provision of Higher Education in the province. An important milestone was the decision taken at the African National Congress's National General Council meeting held in eThekwini (Durban) in 2010 which resolved to establish two new universities. This decision was instrumental in facilitating for the establishment of a university in the Mpumalanga Province.

In 2010, the Minister of Higher Education and Training, Dr B E Nzimande, appointed two task teams to investigate the feasibility of establishing new universities in Mpumalanga and the Northern Cape. The Mpumalanga task team which submitted a favourable report in September 2011, recommending the establishment of a new university in Mpumalanga was led by Prof T Z Mthembu.

In July 2013, the State President, Mr Jacob Zuma, announced the name of the new university as the University of Mpumalanga as well as the names of the members of the Interim Council to oversee its formal establishment. The University of Mpumalanga, a comprehensive university, was formally and legally promulgated through the publication of Government Notice (No. 36772) on 22 August 2013 and launched on 31 October 2013. The Interim Council appointed the Strategic Management Team which managed the day-to-day operations of the university.

== Governance and administration ==
The Higher Education Act (Act No. 101 of 1997) established that the university is to be governed by Council.

- The Chancellor of the university is the ceremonial head of the university who, in the name of the university, confers all degrees.
- The Vice-Chancellor are merged, with the Vice-Chancellor responsible for the day-to-day running of the university.
- The Senate is responsible for regulating all teaching, research and academic functions of the university.
- Additionally, the Students' Representative Council (SRC), represents the interests of the university's students which also selects representatives to Senate and Council.

=== Chancellor ===
- Cyril Ramaphosa 2016-2021
- Mandisa Maya 2021-

== Campuses ==
The university is divided into two academic campuses - Mbombela and Siyabuswa campuses.

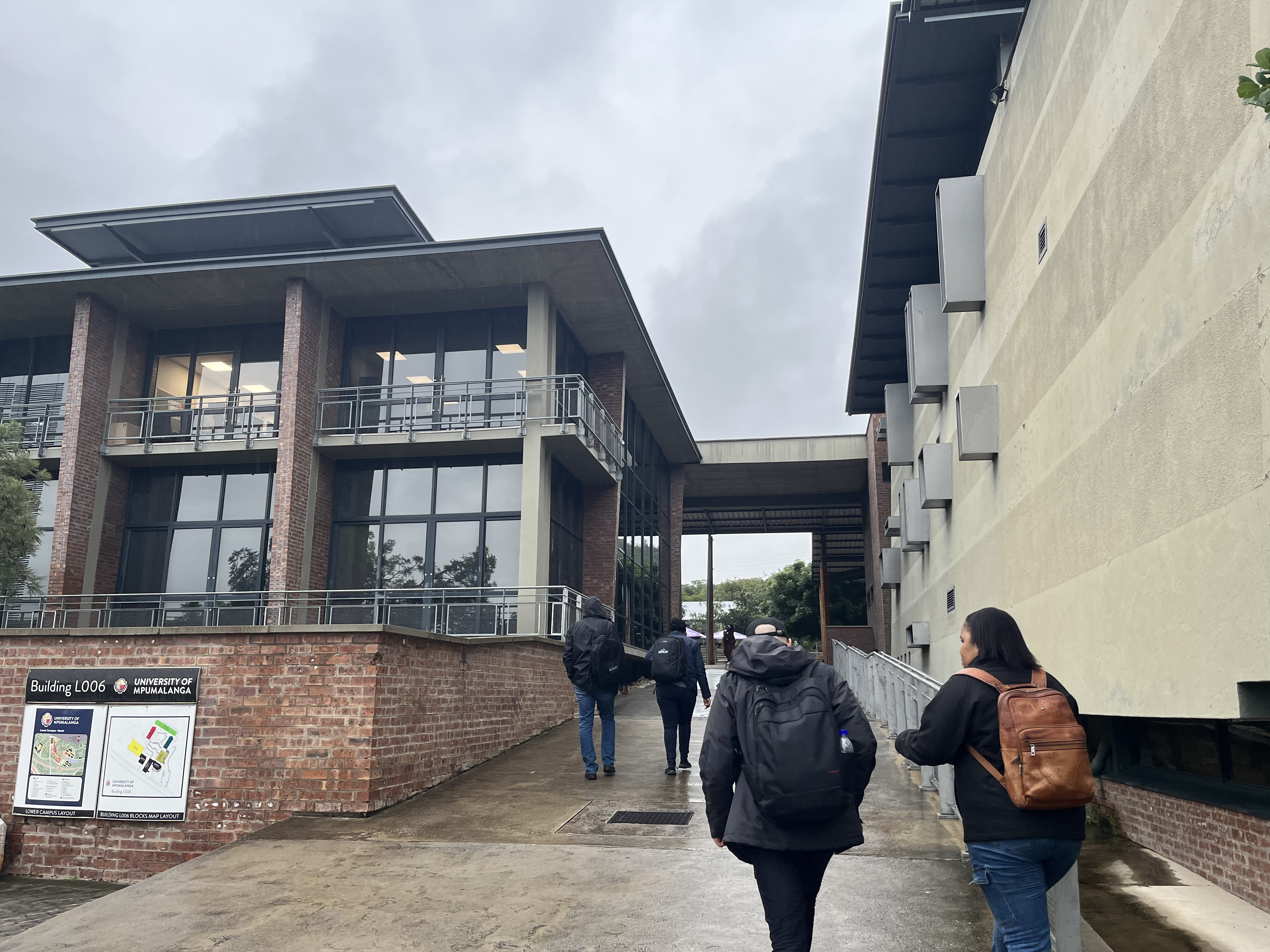
Inside In the University of Mpumalanga

== Academics ==
=== Research ===
The university focuses on foundation phase teaching.

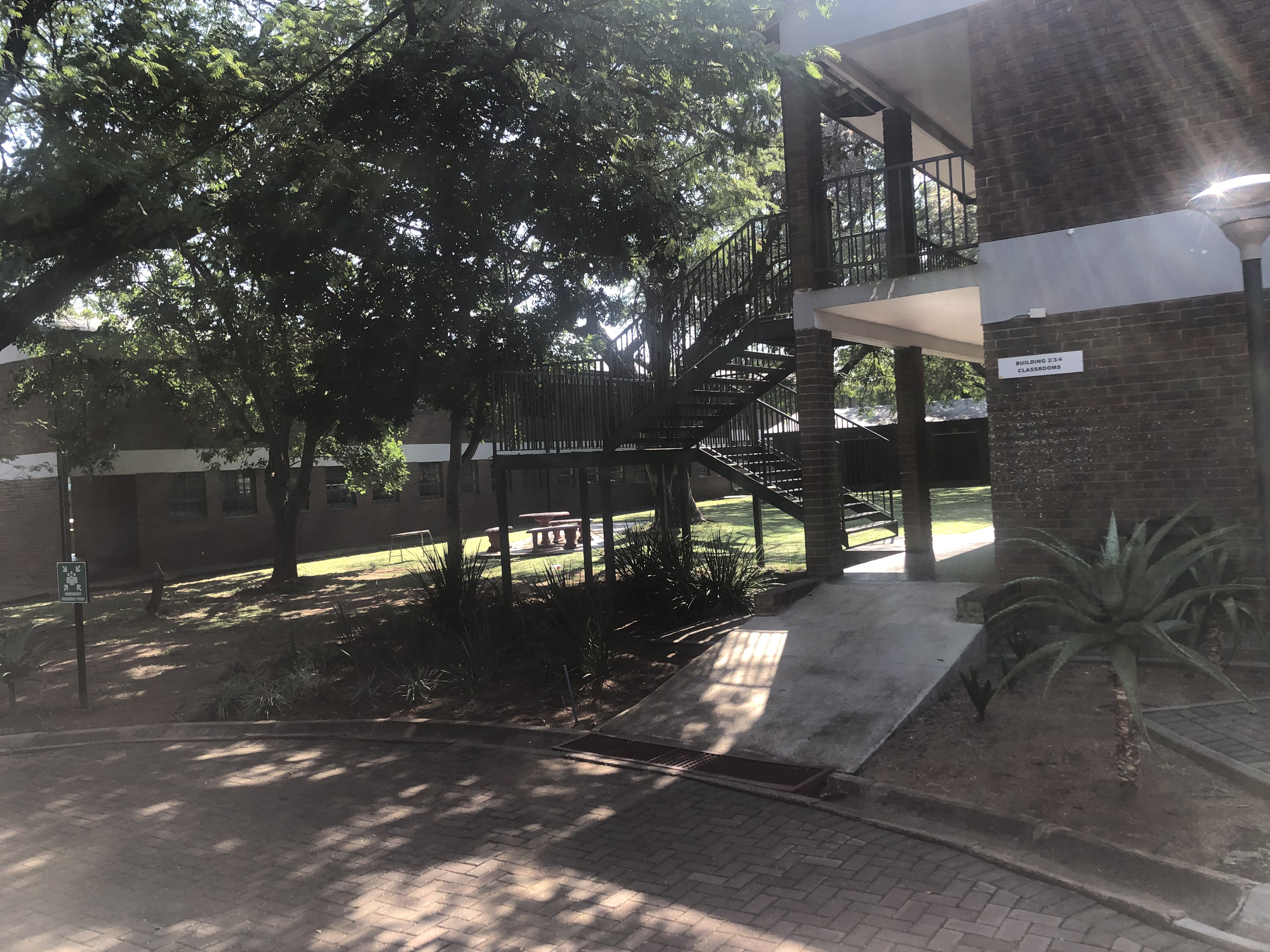
Main Gate

=== Faculties ===
The university offers the following programme:

- Bachelor of Developmental Studies;
- Bachelor of Arts;
- Bachelor of Commerce;
- Bachelor of Education in Foundation Phase Teaching;
- Bachelor of Science in Agriculture;
- Bachelor of Science;
- Bachelor of Environmental Science;
- Bachelor of Agriculture in Agricultural Extension and Rural Resource Management;
- Bachelor of Information Communication Technology in Application Development;
- Diploma in Agriculture in Plant Production;
- Diploma in Animal Production;
- Diploma in Nature Conservation;
- Diploma in Hospitality Management;
- Diploma in Information Communication Technology in Applications Development;
- Advanced Diploma in Information Communication Technology in Application Development;
- Advanced Diploma in Agriculture in Agricultural Extension.
- Postgraduate Diploma in Information Communication Technology in Application Development;
- Masters of Computing in Information Communication Technology in Application Development;
- Bachelor of Laws;
- Master of Development Studies.
- Bachelor of Social Work
