= Rolle, Mpumalanga =

Rolle
- Location within Mpumalanga Location within South Africa
- Coordinates: 24.729°S 31.235°E
- Country: South Africa
- Province: Mpumalanga
- District: Ehlanzeni
- Municipality: Bushbuckridge

Area
  - Total: 6.58 km^{2} (2.54 sq mi)

Population (2011)
  - Total: 6,291
  - Density: 956/km^{2} (2,480/sq mi)

Racial makeup (2011)
  - Black African: 99.7%
  - Indian/Asian: 0.1%
  - Other: 0.1%

First languages (2011)
  - Tsonga: 98.0%
  - Other: 2.0%
- Time zone: UTC+2 (SAST)
- PO box: 1223

Rolle is a town in Ehlanzeni District Municipality in the Mpumalanga province of South Africa.
