= Nokuthula Sibiya =

South African academic and university administrator

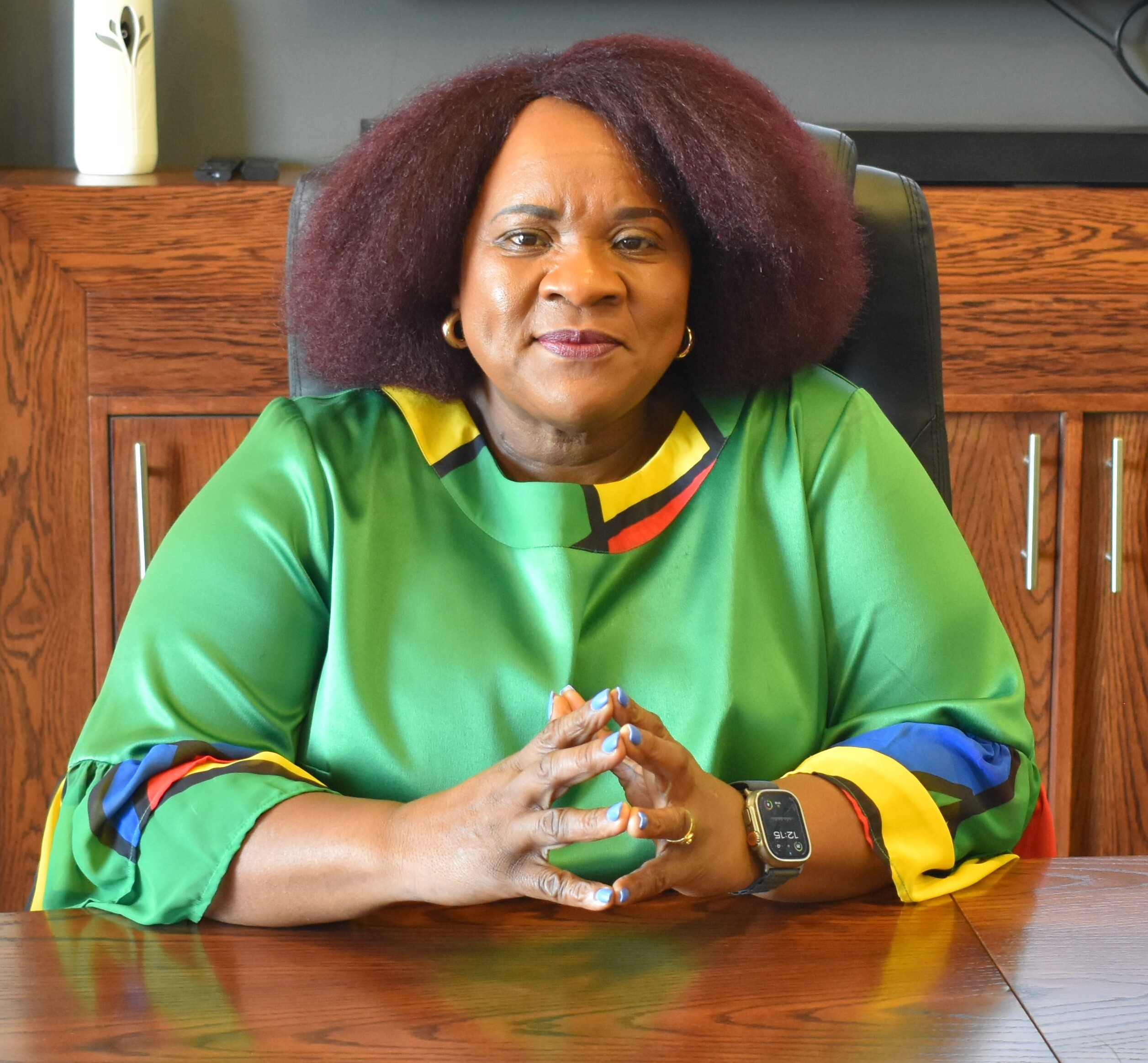

Nokuthula Sibiya is a South African academic, nursing scholar and higher education administrator who serves as the Vice‑Chancellor and Principal of Mangosuthu University of Technology. She is known for her leadership in higher education, research in nursing and health sciences, and contributions to institutional transformation. Sibiya became the first woman and first Umlazi‑born person to lead the university.

== Early life and education ==
Nokuthula Sibiya was born and raised in Umlazi Township, KwaZulu‑Natal, South Africa. She trained in nursing and later completed advanced studies, including a Doctorate in Technology (PhD) in Nursing. She is a C2‑rated scientist by the National Research Foundation (South Africa).

== Academic and administrative career ==
Before her appointment as Vice‑Chancellor, Sibiya served in multiple leadership roles in higher education, including as Deputy Vice‑Chancellor for Research, Innovation and Engagement at Mangosuthu University of Technology and earlier at the Durban University of Technology.

In July 2024, Sibiya’s appointment as Vice‑Chancellor and Principal of Mangosuthu University of Technology was announced. She assumed office on 1 August 2024, marking a historic milestone as the first woman and first Umlazi‑born individual to lead the university.

== Research ==
Sibiya’s research interests include nursing education, student well‑being, postgraduate supervision, and health sciences. She has published peer‑reviewed research articles, collaborated on interdisciplinary studies, and contributed to the scholarship of teaching and learning in health professions. Many of her works are available via academic repositories and journals.

== Awards and recognition ==
- Distinguished Woman Scientist Award (Human Sciences category), South African Women in Science Awards, 2018.
- EDHE Rising Star Award for entrepreneurship support and institutional leadership, 2024.

== Selected publications ==
The following publications include peer‑reviewed work by Sibiya:

- Gumede, D.; Sibiya, M. N. (2023). "An analysis of digital stories of self-care practices among first-year students at a university of technology in South Africa". Journal of Student Affairs in Africa. 11 (2). doi:10.24085/jsaa.v11i2.4911.
- Sibiya, M. N. (2015). "Experiences of nursing students regarding interdisciplinary postgraduate supervision at the University of Technology in KwaZulu-Natal Province, South Africa: Teaching and learning in health care professions". African Journal for Physical, Health Education, Recreation and Dance. 21 (1): 409–417.
- Onwubu, S. C.; Sibiya, M. N.; Makgobole, M. U. (2023). "Mental Health Challenges during COVID-19 Pandemic: Experiences of Primary Healthcare Nurses in Durban, South Africa". International Journal of Environmental Research and Public Health. 20 (17).

== See also ==
- Mangosuthu University of Technology
- Higher education in South Africa
