= University of Limpopo =

Public university in Limpopo Province, South Africa

Coordinates: 23.886°S 29.738°E

- Motto: The University of Limpopo for human and environmental wellness in a rural context; finding solutions for Africa!
- Type: Public university
- Established: 1 January 2005 (by merger of existing institutions)
- Chancellor: Nkosazana Dlamini Zuma
- Vice-Chancellor: Jeffrey Mabelebele
- Location: Mankweng, Limpopo, South Africa
- Website: www.ul.ac.za

The University of Limpopo (Afrikaans: Universiteit van Limpopo) is a public university in the Limpopo Province, South Africa. It was formed on 1 January 2005, by merger of the University of the North and the Medical University of South Africa (MEDUNSA). These previous institutions formed the Turfloop and MEDUNSA campuses of the university, respectively. In 2015 the MEDUNSA campus split and became the Sefako Makgatho Health Sciences University.

== History ==
The University of the North, nicknamed "Turfloop" after its location, was established in 1959 under the apartheid regime's policy of separate ethnically-based institutions of higher learning policy. The university was sited at Turfloop farm about 40 kilometres (25 mi) east of Pietersburg. The town that grew around the university was named Sovenga, for the three ethnic groups (Sotho, Venda, Tsonga) that Apartheid ideology intended to study there. In reality, most inhabitants refer to the town as Mankweng, after one of the chiefs of the area. Under later apartheid, the University of the North served as a "model" university where dignitaries were brought to show the "viability" of the separate facilities. As such, it received heavy government subsidies, but the real problem was that the students that the university supposedly served were so under-resourced in their standard education that the quality of instruction was placed under incredible demands.

The university was a centre of resistance to apartheid in the 1960s, 70s, and 80s with the SADF occupying the grounds often during those years. After the end of apartheid, the university struggled through various re-organisation and rationalisation schemes, yet always managed to survive. Enrollment fluctuated wildly in the years after liberation and while some faculty did not transition very easily, others were able to seize upon the new opportunities.

The University of Limpopo is the result of a merger between the former Medical University of Southern Africa and the University of the North, which occurred on 1 January 2005.

The extension of University Education Act of 1959 made provision for the establishment of racially exclusive universities for black South Africans. Under the provisions of the Act, the University College of the North, was established about thirty kilometres from Polokwane on 1 August 1959. The College was placed under the academic trusteeship of the University of South Africa. This formative relationship was maintained until the South African Parliament promulgated the University of the North Act (Act No. 47 of 1969) thus bringing to an end the College status as of 1 January 1970.

The university is located in the foothills of the Hwiti (Wolkberg range) in Mankweng township, midway between Polokwane and Tzaneen.

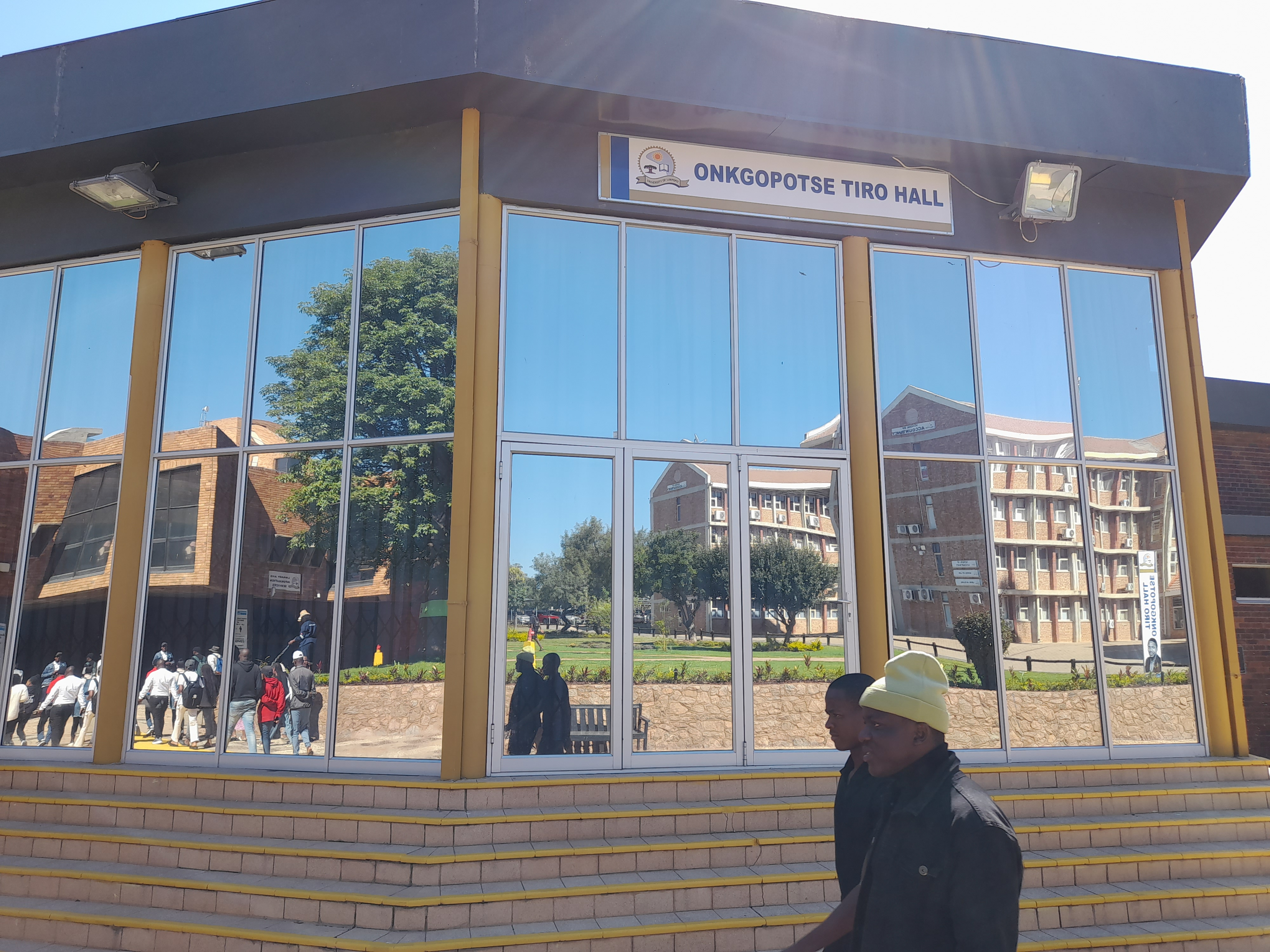
Onkgopotse Tiro Hall

== Faculties ==
=== Humanities ===
- School of Languages and Communication Studies.
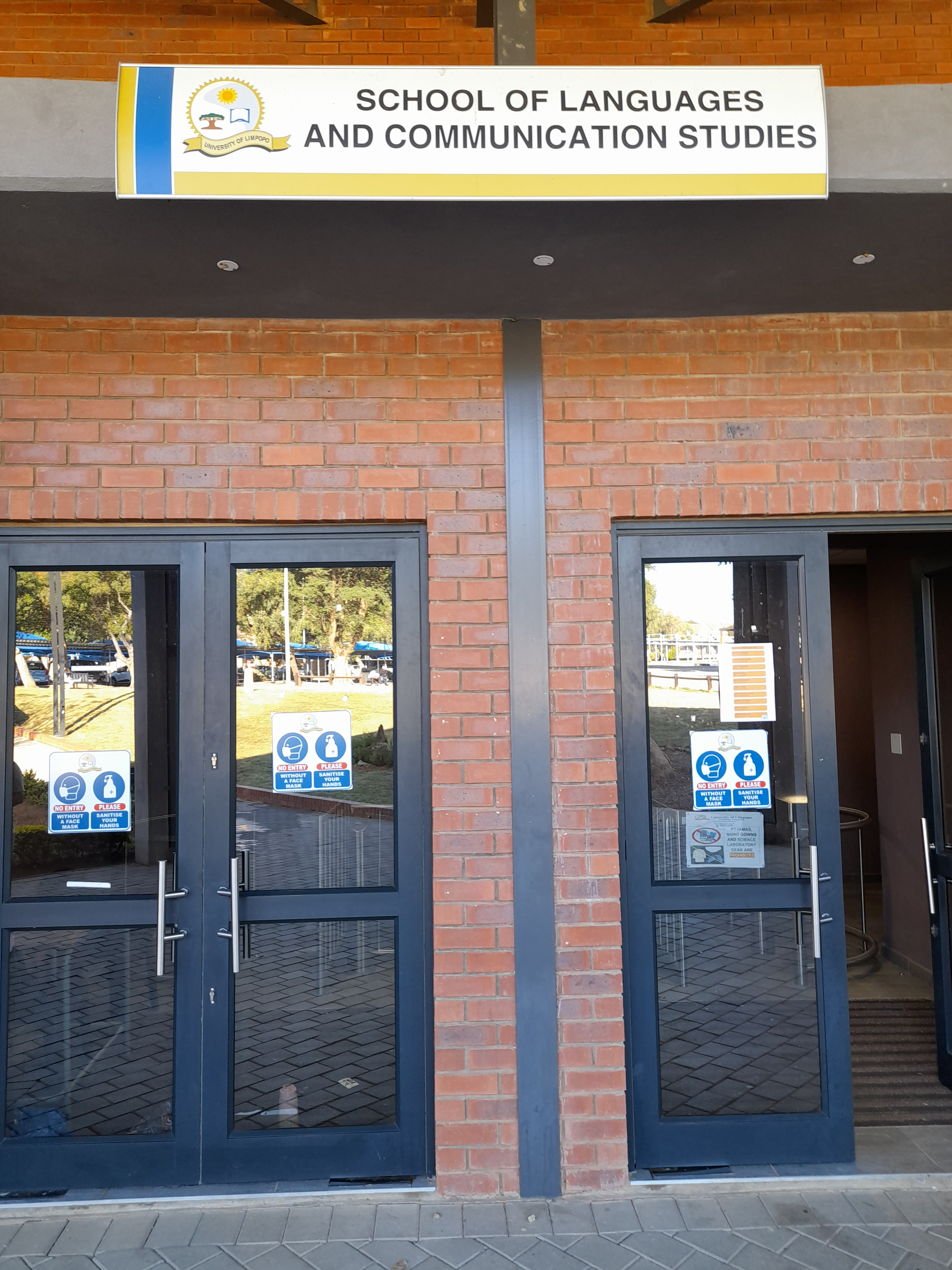
  School of Languages at University of Limpopo
- School of Social Sciences
- School of Education

=== Management and Law ===
- School of Law
- School of Accountancy (SoA)
- School of Economics and Management (SoE & M)
- Turfloop Graduate School of Leadership

=== Science and Agriculture ===
- School of Physical and Mineral Sciences
- School of Molecular and Life Sciences
- School of Agricultural and Environmental Sciences
- School of Mathematical and Computer Sciences

=== Health Sciences ===
- School of Medicine (SOM)
- School of Health Science (SHCS)

== Notable alumni ==
- Frank Chikane
- Solly Malatsi
- Cyril Ramaphosa
- Ongkopotse Tiro
- Pansy Tlakula
- Hans Daniel Namuhuja
- Priscillah Mabelane
- Lazarus Chakwera
- Conny Nxumalo
- Lulama Xingwana
