= Sol Plaatje University =

Public university in Kimberly, South Africa

Coordinates: 28°44′42″S 24°45′51″E

- Sol Plaatje Universiteit
- Motto: Light from Africa - For Humanity
- Type: Public
- Established: 2014
- Chairperson: Yvonne Mokgoro
- Chancellor
- Vice-Chancellor: Prof Debra Meyer
- Location: Kimberley, Northern Cape, South Africa
- Language: English
- Colours: Orange and Red
- Website: www.spu.ac.za

Sol Plaatje University is a public university located in Kimberley, South Africa. Established in 2014, it is the first and only university located in the Northern Cape province.

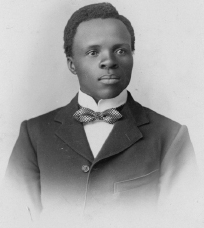
Solomon Tshekisho Plaatje, 1876-1932, after whom the university is named: intellectual, journalist, linguist, politician, translator, writer

== History ==
The idea of establishing a university in the Northern Cape gained political endorsement in 2012, most notably in President Jacob Zuma’s announcement of 5 July 2012 that the seat and main campus for the university would be the inner city of Kimberley. It was believed that there was “potential to inject new life and purpose into this historic mining city”. The idea achieved legal substance when a record of intention was signed by officials in Kimberley on 19 March 2013. Party to the agreement were national Higher Education Minister Blade Nzimande, the Northern Cape Province's acting premier Grizelda Cjiekella, and the mayor of the Sol Plaatje Municipality, Agnes Ntlhangula.

The signing of the record of intention was a preparatory step towards a gazetted notice which would bring the institution into being as a legal entity. The university would be one of the first two to be established in post-apartheid South Africa – the other to be situated in Mpumalanga.

Launched in a ceremony in Kimberley on 19 September 2013, it had been formally established as a public university in terms of Section 20 of the Higher Education Act of 1997, by way of Government Notice 630, dated 22 August 2013. Minister of Higher Education and Training, Blade Nzimande, observed at the launch that this “is the first new university (in South Africa) to be launched since 1994 and as such is a powerful symbol of the country’s democracy, inclusiveness, and growth. It represents a new order of African intellect, with a firm focus on innovation and excellence." Previously announcing the name for the university, on 25 July 2013, President Jacob Zuma mentioned the development of academic niche areas that did not exist elsewhere, or were under-represented, in South Africa. "Given the rich heritage of Kimberley and the Northern Cape in general," Zuma said, "it is envisaged that Sol Plaatje will specialise in heritage studies, including interconnected academic fields such as museum management, archaeology, indigenous languages, and restoration architecture."

The university opened in 2014, accommodating a modest initial intake of 135 students.

The Department of Higher Education and Training (DHET) appointed the University of the Witwatersrand to set up a DHET New Universities Project Management Team to plan for the new university in Kimberley.

Nominations were invited in December 2012 for members of an Interim Council for the new university.

=== Leadership and Governance ===
The Interim Council announced by President Jacob Zuma on 25 July 2013 comprises: Ms Jennifer Glennie, as Chairperson, and, as members: Mr Abel Madonsela, Mr Maruping Lekwene, Dr Yvonne Muthien, and Prof Vishnu Padayachee.

The first Vice Chancellor and Principal was Yunus Ballim. In April 2020 he was succeeded by Andrew Crouch, the second Vice Chancellor and Principal, who served until December 2025. He was succeeded by the current Vice Chancellor and Principal, Professor Debra Meyer.

== Feasibility ==
A study into the feasibility of both the infrastructure and operations for the new university had been submitted to national Treasury in September 2012. Treasury endorsed the plan (including that for a university in Mpumalanga), allocating R2 billion for the period 2013 to 2016.

== Campus ==
The university facilities will be located within the marked area

It is anticipated that the Sol Plaatje University would occupy a combination of existing and purpose-built structures in the inner city of Kimberley, specifically the present Civic Centre including parts of the Oppenheimer Gardens and surrounding buildings. These include the former Cape Provincial Administration building which has been used by the National Institute for Higher Education. Provincial MEC Pauline Williams (Sport, Arts and Culture) has referred to the McGregor Museum in Kimberley becoming "a serious role-player" with its collections and research disciplines being key resources and "the nucleus of a future faculty."

In May 2013 the Department of Higher Education and Training New Universities Project Management Team (Northern Cape) invited expressions of interest from architects to participate in a two-stage architectural ideas competition for addressing the need for new buildings and “to encourage innovative ideas, and best practice concepts, as well as to identify talented designers to participate in the design of the university precincts and buildings.”

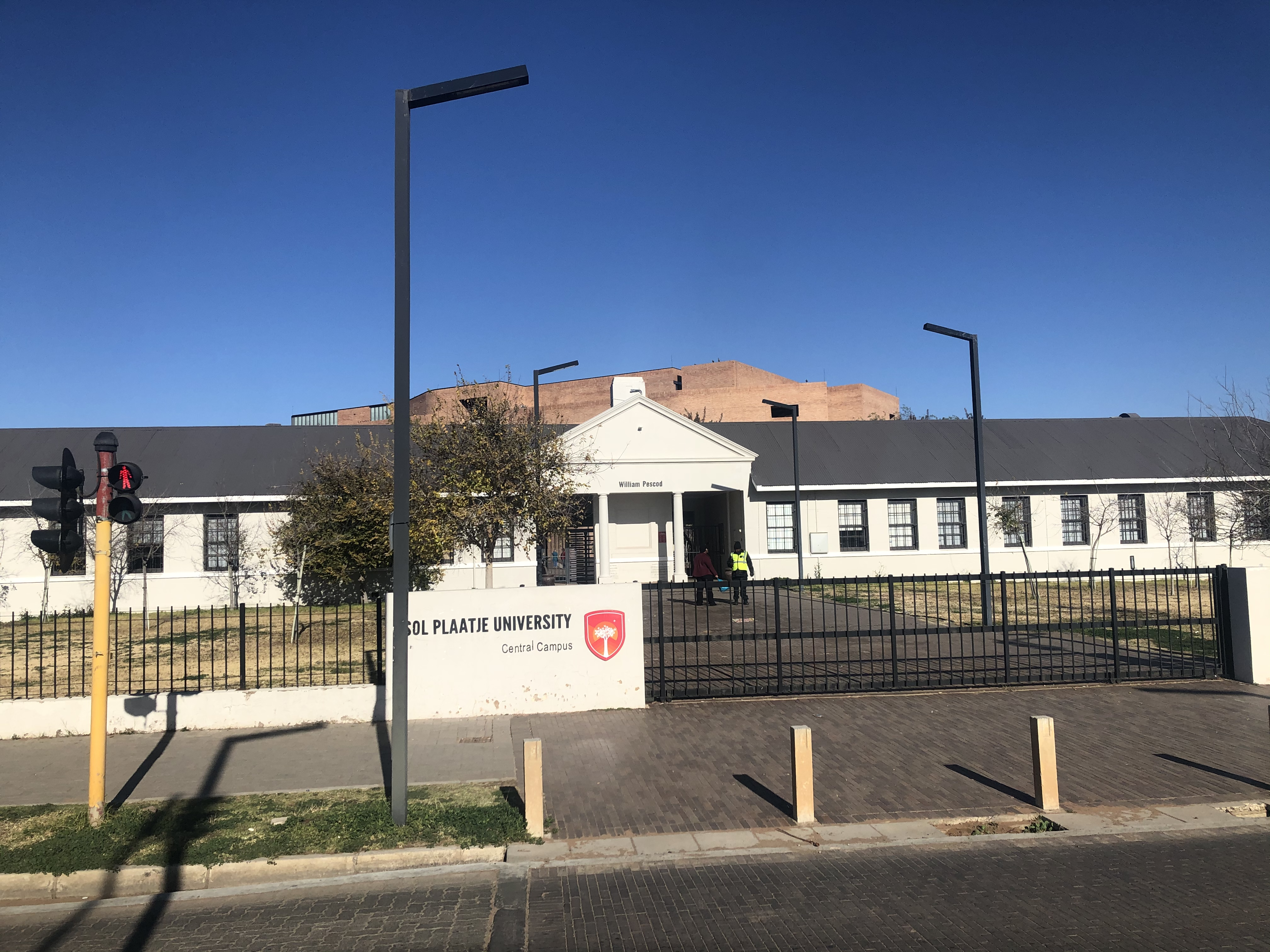
Sol Plaatjie University Central Campus.

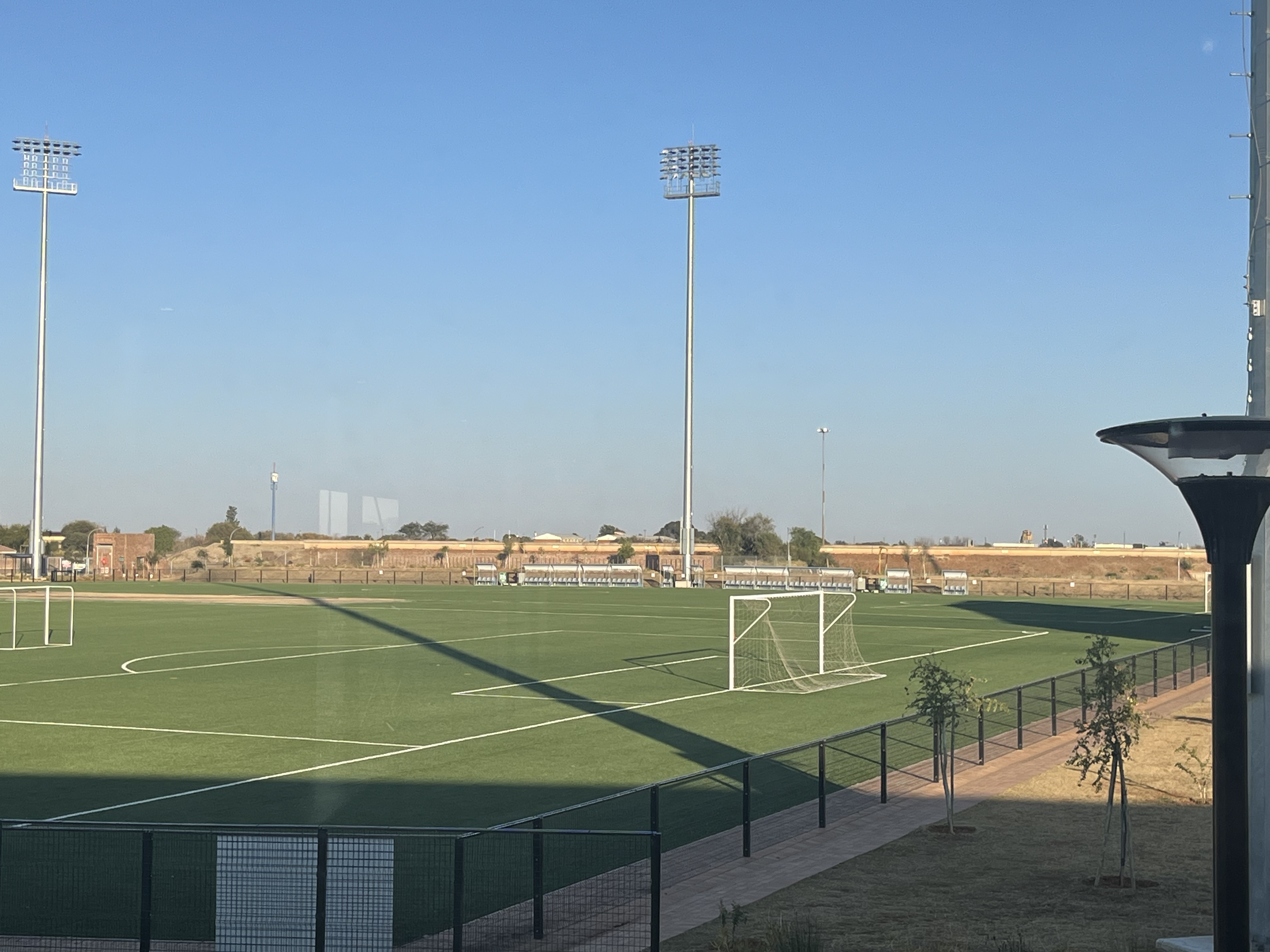
South Campus sportsground

Most of the newly built buildings have won regional and national awards for architecture since completion while the central auditorium building designed by Henri Comrie of URBA Architects and Urban Designers won the prize for the best building for higher education at the World Architecture Festival (WAF) held in Lisbon in 2022.

== Curriculum ==
Programmes that have been reported in the media would be in disciplines such as information technology and computer sciences, engineering, and agriculture; studies in management focusing on business and hospitality management; nursing as a focus of health sciences; with specializations in teacher education, indigenous languages, heritage studies, and art also being planned.

It was also suggested that the university was “expected to offer postgraduate studies in astronomy, as well as in applied sciences such as renewable energy, low carbon energy, hydrology, water resource management, and climate variability.”

The DHET New Universities Project Management Team website indicates the intention that the new university should have unique programmes and research priorities enabling it to attract students, academics and researchers nationally and internationally. This implies academic missions that would develop towards specialist niche areas not available elsewhere in South Africa, attracting and retaining skilled staff, while inspiring a vibrant student population.

In creating a strong academic hub, the individuality of the province would be drawn upon to develop a unique academic focus.

It is envisaged that the university in the Northern Cape would be a comprehensive, multi-campus University with the seat and main campus in Kimberley. The qualification type would focus on “Higher Certificate, Advanced Certificate and Diploma level as vocational and technology-focused programmes with a phased approach towards formative and professional bachelor's degrees in the study fields of Engineering and Management Sciences.”

Specifically, the following programmes are considered:

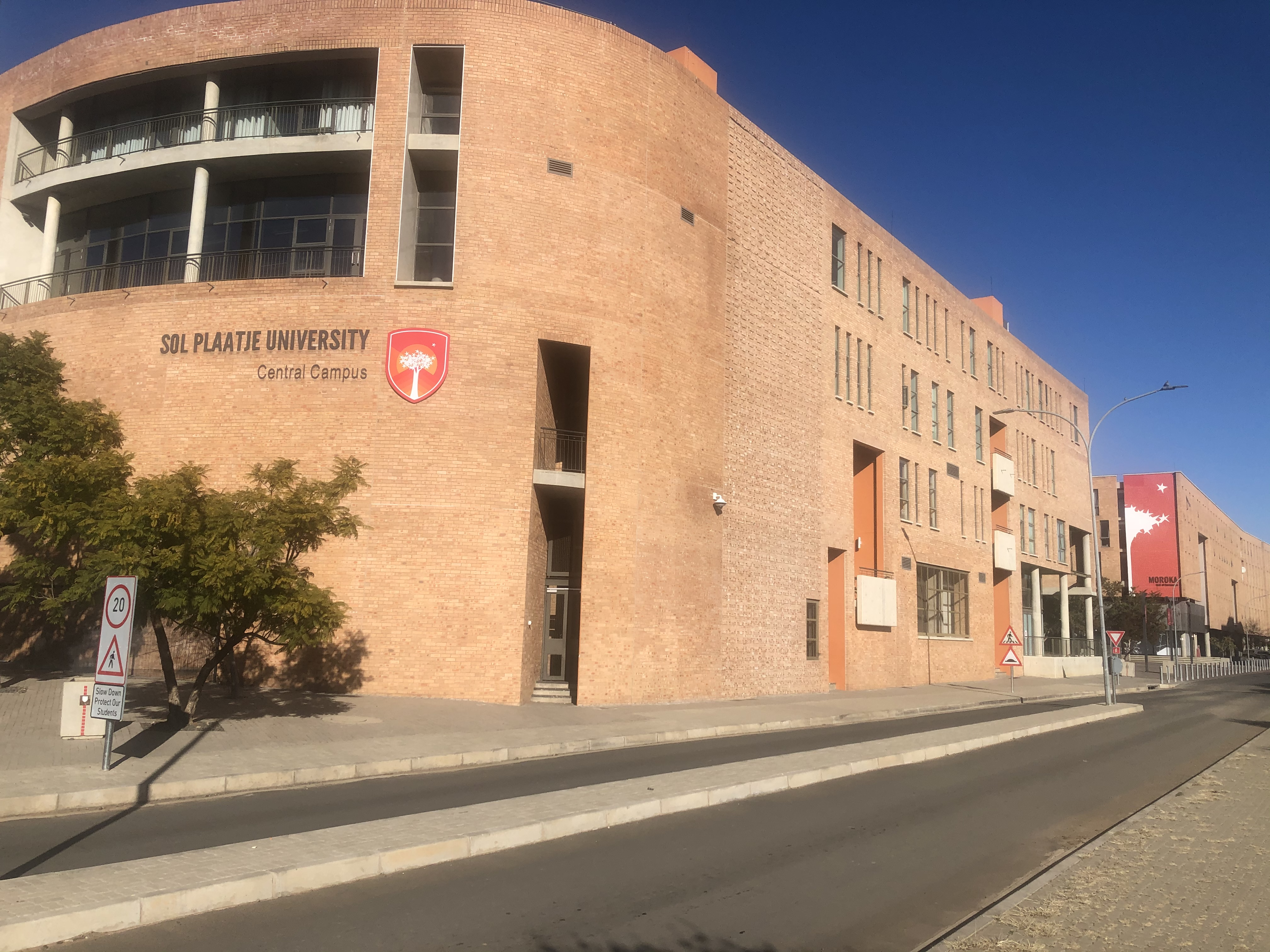
Sol Plaatjie University Central Campus part of which is still under construction.

=== Available from 2014 ===
- Computer and Information Science/Engineering: Diploma in Information Technology (Applications Development)
- Business, Economics and Management Sciences: National Diploma: Retail Business Management
- Education: B Ed (Further Education and Training - Maths, Technology & Science)

=== From 2015 ===
- Health Professions and Related Clinical Sciences: Diploma in Nursing and Higher Certificate in Emergency Medical Care
- Social Sciences: Museology/Museum Studies and Heritage Studies (New qualification)
- Life Sciences & Physical Sciences BSc (Life and Physical Sciences)

=== From 2016 ===
- Business, Economics and Management Sciences: National Diploma Tourism Management
- Visual and performing arts: National Diploma in Fine Arts
- Agriculture: National Diploma in Agriculture
- Diploma in Law or Bachelor Law
