= University of Zululand =

Public university in KwaZulu-Natal, South Africa

- Universiteit van Zoeloeland (Afrikaans)
- Other name: UniZulu
- Former name: University College of Zululand
- Motto: Dilligentia Cresco
- Motto in English: By diligence I grow
- Type: Public university
- Established: 1960
- Academic affiliations: AAU; ACU; HESA
- Chancellor: Raymond Zondo
- Vice-Chancellor: Xoliswa Mtose
- Academic staff: 345 (2022)
- Students: 16,337 (2022)
- Undergraduates: 14,882 (2022)
- Location: Empangeni, KwaZulu-Natal, South Africa; 28°51′10″S 31°51′00″E
- Colours: Blue, white, black, gold
- Mascot: African Fish Eagle
- Website: www.unizulu.ac.za

The University of Zululand or UniZulu is a comprehensive tertiary educational institution north of uThukela River in KwaZulu-Natal, South Africa. The university has established partnerships with other universities in the United States and Europe; such as the University of Mississippi, Radford University, Florida Agricultural and Mechanical University and Chicago State University. UniZulu was founded with the help of the Prince of KwaPhindangene, Mangosuthu Buthelezi, who was also chancellor of the institution when it was established in 1960.

== History ==
- 1960: The University College of Zululand was established as a constituent college academically affiliated to the University of South Africa. The very first class of 41 students included five females. Professor PAW Cook was appointed as the first rector.
- 1961: The university was officially opened on 8 March at a ceremony attended by 280 dignitaries, including tribal chiefs as well as diplomats from Switzerland, Brazil and Austria.
- 1963: The first graduation ceremony took place.
- 1964: Prof JA Maré was appointed as the second rector.
- 1970: University status was granted to the University College of Zululand.
- 1971: Dr TF Muller was appointed as the first Chancellor. The university’s coat of arms was officially introduced.
- 1977: Prof AC Nkabinde became the first Black rector.
- 1979: Dr MG Buthelezi was installed as the first Black Chancellor. Prof AM Nzimande was appointed as the first campus director.
- 1980: Election for the first Student Representative Council takes place, as well as the opening of the King Bhekuzulu Hall currently located at the KwaDlangezwa Campus.
- 1981: The Cecil Renaud Extramural Division is established at the main campus to accommodate after-hours students. The Department of Nursing Science is also established.
- 1982: The University of Zululand Foundation, administered by a Board of Governors, is established to oversee the university’s fundraising and investment operations.
- 1983: A farm of 2500 hectares is acquired in the Ntambanana area for the establishment of a Department of Agriculture. A Centre for Business starts functioning. Approval is obtained for the establishment of departments of Hydrology and Mathematical Statistics. Dr M Brindley becomes the first white student to obtain a doctorate (special concession).
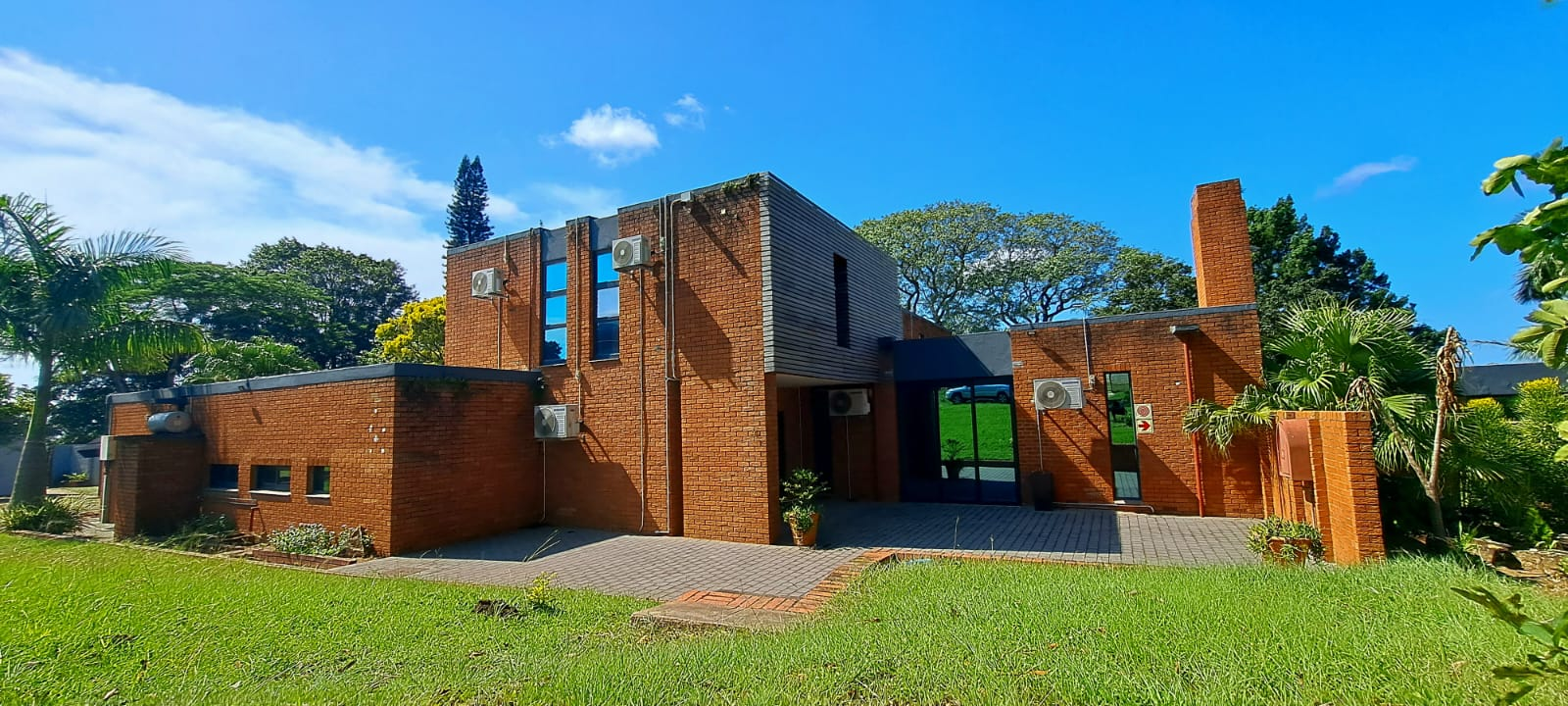
- This is the Old VC's House
  1984: The University Council is granted autonomy with regard to practically all matters relating to the disbursement of the annual subsidy, provision of facilities, the determination of the establishment and the employment of staff.
- 1985: The Science Centre and the research unit for New Religious Movements and Churches (NERMIC) are established.
- 1986: The University of Zululand is opened to all races. First Honorary Doctorate awarded to Rev. Enos ZK Sikhakhane.
- 1987: The new library building is completed. The Centre for Legal Services is also established.
- 1988: Departments of Agriculture, Engineering, Human Movement Science and the Institute for Education and Human Development are established.
- 1993: Strong links are forged internationally. The research and training farm becomes operational.
- 1994: Prof CRM Dlamini becomes the fourth rector. An honorary doctorate degree is conferred upon His Majesty, King Goodwill Zwelithini at a ceremony attended by the then State President, Nelson Mandela. The UZNET computer network is established at the main campus.
- 1995: Honorary Law Doctorate conferred on Deputy-President FW de Klerk.
- 2000: The Hewlett-Packard Computer Academy is inaugurated.
- 2001: The new modular academic system is introduced. Then Deputy President Dr JG Zuma is installed as the university’s third chancellor. An honorary doctorate is conferred on then Deputy-President Dr JG Zuma.
- 2002: The University of Zululand is declared as the only institution of higher education north of the uThukela River and, henceforth, includes outcomes-based programmes in its curriculum. The university experiences an increased intake of students from other parts of Africa, especially from Namibia, Nigeria, Kenya, Zimbabwe, Botswana, Lesotho and Swaziland.

Standardised assessment tests (SATs) are administered for the first time in order to assess first-year students in English, Mathematics and Science, so that students at risk in these subjects can be assisted to improve their skills through participation in appropriate enrichment programmes. The Overarching Reconfiguration Committee (ORC) is established to represent all stakeholder groupings on campus as well as local businesses so as to generate policies and principles to facilitate the goal of reconfiguring the university into a comprehensive institution as decreed by the Department of Education in May 2002.

A five-year Strategic Plan is inaugurated.

- 2003: Prof RV Gumbi becomes the university’s first black female rector and vice-chancellor. She is the fifth rector appointed since 1960.

Effective measures are introduced to turn around the university’s poor financial record and to redeem an overdraft of over R46-million within a three-year period.

Launch of the South African-Norway Tertiary Education Development Programme (SANTED) – a major capacity-building project to meet the needs of the restructuring process.The Quality Promotion Assurance (QPA) Unit is launched to promote quality in teaching, learning and research by means of practical support, provision of advice and policy development.

- 2004: The chair for the Centre for Integrated Rural Development (CIRD) is launched – partnership between Kumba Resources and the University of Zululand.
- 2005: The former six faculties (Arts, Education, Science and Agriculture, Law, Commerce and Administration as well as Theology and Religion Studies) merge to become four Faculties, namely Arts, Education, Commerce, Administration and Law as well as Science and Agriculture.

The university celebrates its 45th anniversary.

UNIZULU launches its internal Organisational Development Plan (ODP) and major turn-around achievements are recorded.

- 2006: Replacement of UniZulu’s old computer system with a state-of-the-art ITS computer infrastructure worth R32,9 million.

A new Department of Quality Assurance is established and a Director, Prof G. Kistan, is appointed.

- 2007: Four Executive Deans are appointed in the four faculties, namely, Prof Nomahlubi Makunga in the Faculty of Arts Prof Sitwala Imenda in the Faculty of Education, Prof Ramesh Ori in the Faculty of Science and Agriculture, and Prof van den Bergh in the Faculty of Commerce, Administration and Law.
- The construction of new R160 million off-campus building commences in the central business district of Richards Bay.

GIJIMA (Change Management Project) is inaugurated to ensure the implementation of operational changes in a systematic and controlled fashion.

New student residences are completed to house 368 occupants.The university, with co-host Jackson State University, US, hosts the first-ever Global-World HIV/AIDS Alliance conference (GHAA) in Africa which was attended by delegates from 25 global countries.UniZulu’s Chemistry Department and the International Centre for Materials Research, the University of California and Jackson State University, host an International Nanotechnology Conference with 1996 Nobel Laureate and initiator of the nanotechnology revolution, Sir Harry Kroto, as Chairman.

- 2008: The then Minister of Education, Ms Naledi Pandor, and UniZulu’s then chancellor Dr JG Zuma, commission the construction of new residences at the main campus and officiate the construction of a new campus at Richards Bay.
- Preparations commence for the Institutional Audit by the Department of Education in October 2008.
- 2009: UniZulu, together with the Department of Economic Department, co-hosts the First International Co-operative Conference in February.

The Richards Bay Campus is launched in October 2009.

- 2010: Prof F Mazibuko becomes the university’s second black female rector and vice-chancellor. She is the sixth rector appointed since 1960.
- 2016: The internationally acclaimed UniZulu Science Centre turned 30 years.
- 2016: Professor Mtose is appointed as the vice-chancellor.
- April 2018: was a day of mass celebration and ululation at the University of Zululand as it inaugurated and swore in its new Chancellor, Deputy Chief Justice of South Africa, Raymond Mnyamezeli Mlungisi Zondo, at its iconic King Bhekuzulu Hall, KwaDlangezwa Campus.
- 2018: King Goodwill Zwelithini received an Honorary Doctorate in Social Work for his far reaching vision and vital contribution in combating social ills amongst the Youth and the Society at large.
- 2018: UniZulu BCom (Accounting Science) Accreditation students are eligible to study for their postgraduate degree (known as CTA, or equivalent) without needing to complete a bridging course or programme at a university that offers such SAICA-accredited programmes.
- 2019: The University of Zululand Choir is appointed as TB Ambassadors by the Deputy Minister of South Africa: Mr DD Mabuza donated a bus to them.
- 2020: UniZulu celebrates its 60th Celebration and 6 Honorary Doctorates were awarded to Criselda Kananda; Dr Pali Lehohla; Lindelani Mkhize; Sam M Phillips; Professor Busi Bhengu and Tumelo MW.
- 2020: UniZulu received accreditation to offer Engineering qualifications.

== Campus ==
The main Campus is 22 km south of Empangeni and about 142 km north of Durban off the N2 National Road on the KwaZulu-Natal North Coast. Empangeni (UMhlathuze Local Municipality) is the nearest town.

=== Satellite campuses ===
The university has previously had satellite campuses throughout KwaZulu-Natal and further afield. As of 2024, Richards Bay is its only satellite campus. The Richards Bay Campus is home to the UNIZULU Science Centre, which provides a hands-on science education to school children from throughout the province.

== Students ==
=== Student enrollment ===
The University of Zululand is a contact-only university, with 8,751 students enrolled in 2007. This total included 8,738 full-time students and 13 part-time students. Of the total, 8,583 were South African citizens, while 75 were from other SADC countries and 93 students from non-SADC countries. Enrollment was 17,360 students for the academic year of 2018.

== Campus media ==
- Ongoye Online was the official newsletter of the University of Zululand that published news for the university staff and management.

== Academic faculties ==
Programs are offered within four faculties:

=== Commerce, Administration and Law ===
The Faculty of Commerce, administration and law (Henceforth FCAL) is headed by the dean Professor Lorraine Greyling and comprises 5 academic departments, namely:

1. Accounting & Auditing (including Information Systems) which headed by Professor M Livingstone CA (SA)
2. Department of Business Management (incorporating Human Resources Management) which is headed by N Vezi-Magigaba
3. Department of Economics, headed by Professor I Kaseeram
4. Department of Public Administration, headed by NM Jili
5. Department of law (Private law, Public law and Criminal & Procedural law) Which is headed by K Naidoo

=== Education ===
The faculty consists of six departments, namely, Comparative and Science of Education, Curriculum and Instruction Studies, Educational Planning and Administration, Educational Psychology and Foundations of Education.

=== Engineering, Science and Agriculture ===
The Faculty of Science and Agriculture offers various Science Programmes within the departments of Agriculture, Biochemistry and Microbiology, Botany, Chemistry, Computer Science, Consumer Science, Geography and Environmental Studies, Human Movement Sciences, Hydrology, Mathematical Science, Nursing, Physics and Engineering, Science Foundation and Zoology.

=== Humanities and Social Sciences ===
1. The Faculty of Arts is the largest faculty within the institution and boasts 16 departments. The Faculty is headed up by the dean, Professor MA Masoga.
2. Anthropology and development studies
3. Communication science
4. Creative Arts
5. English
6. General Linguistics and modern languages
7. Geography and environmental studies
8. History

== Sports and recreation ==
Sports and Recreation is governed by the Student Services Department which carries out some of the co-curricular services that aim at contributing towards total personal student development and advancement. There are 23 sports codes classified as indoor and outdoor.

Indoor sports include aerobics, basketball, bodybuilding, boxing, chess, dance, judo, karate, pool, squash, and table tennis.

Outdoor sports include athletics, cricket, hiking, hockey, netball, rowing, rugby, soccer (men and women), softball, swimming, tennis, and volleyball.
