= Andrew Crouch =

South Africa Academic

- Born: Kimberly
- Citizenship: South Africa
- Education: University of the Western Cape, Concordia University
- Known for: Research in environmental electrochemistry, academic leadership
- Scientific career
- Fields: Chemistry, Environmental Electrochemistry
- Workplaces: Sol Plaatje University, University of the Witwatersrand

Andrew M. Crouch is a Kimberley-born South African academic who served as the second Vice-Chancellor and Principal of Sol Plaatje University since April 2020 to 26 November 2025.

== Education ==
He completed his undergraduate studies at the University of the Western Cape, where he earned a BSc Honours in Chemistry and a BSc in Chemistry and Biochemistry. He holds a PhD in Chemistry from Concordia University in Montreal, Canada.

== Career ==
Before joining Sol Plaatje University, Prof. Crouch spent eleven years at the University of the Witwatersrand in various senior leadership roles, which included Vice-Principal and Deputy Vice-Chancellor.
